= List of 1960 Summer Olympics medal winners =

The following is a complete list of medalists at the 1960 Summer Olympics, held in Rome, Italy, from 25 August to 11 September 1960.

== Athletics ==
=== Men’s events ===
Event	Gold	Silver	Bronze
100 m	Armin Hary; United Team of Germany	Dave Sime; United States	Peter Radford; Great Britain
200 m	Livio Berruti; Italy	Lester Carney; United States	Abdoulaye Seye; France
400 m	Otis Davis; United States	Carl Kaufmann; United Team of Germany	Malcolm Spence; South Africa
800 m	Peter Snell; New Zealand	Roger Moens; Belgium	George Kerr; British West Indies
1500 m	Herb Elliott; Australia	Michel Jazy; France	István Rózsavölgyi; Hungary
5000 m	Murray Halberg; New Zealand	Hans Grodotzki; United Team of Germany	Kazimierz Zimny; Poland
10,000 m	Pyotr Bolotnikov; Soviet Union	Hans Grodotzki; United Team of Germany	David Power; Australia
110 m hurdles	Lee Calhoun; United States	William May; United States	Hayes Jones; United States
400 m hurdles	Glenn Davis; United States	Clifton Cushman; United States	Dick Howard; United States
3000 m steeplechase	Zdzisław Krzyszkowiak; Poland	Nikolay Sokolov; Soviet Union	Semyon Rzhishchin; Soviet Union
4 × 100 m relay	United Team of Germany; Bernd Cullmann; Armin Hary; Walter Mahlendorf; Martin Lauer	Soviet Union; Gusman Kosanov; Leonid Bartenev; Yuriy Konovalov; Edvin Ozolin	Great Britain; Peter Radford; David Jones; David Segal; Nick Whitehead
4 × 400 m relay	United States; Jack Yerman; Earl Young; Glenn Davis; Otis Davis	United Team of Germany; Manfred Kinder; Joachim Reske; Johannes Kaiser; Carl Kaufmann	British West Indies; George Kerr; James Wedderburn; Keith Gardner; Malcolm Spence
marathon	Abebe Bikila; Ethiopia	Rhadi Ben Abdesselam; Morocco	Barry Magee; New Zealand
20 km walk	Vladimir Golubnichy; Soviet Union	Noel Freeman; Australia	Stan Vickers; Great Britain
50 km walk	Don Thompson; Great Britain	John Ljunggren; Sweden	Abdon Pamich; Italy
high jump	Robert Shavlakadze; Soviet Union	Valeriy Brumel; Soviet Union	John Thomas; United States
long jump	Ralph Boston; United States	Irvin Roberson; United States	Igor Ter-Ovanesyan; Soviet Union
triple jump	Józef Szmidt; Poland	Vladimir Goryaev; Soviet Union	Vitold Kreer; Soviet Union
pole vault	Don Bragg; United States	Ron Morris; United States	Eeles Landström; Finland
shot put	Bill Nieder; United States	Parry O'Brien; United States	Dallas Long; United States
discus throw	Al Oerter; United States	Rink Babka; United States	Dick Cochran; United States
javelin throw	Viktor Tsybulenko; Soviet Union	Walter Krüger; United Team of Germany	Gergely Kulcsár; Hungary
hammer throw	Vasili Rudenkov; Soviet Union	Gyula Zsivótzky; Hungary	Tadeusz Rut; Poland
decathlon	Rafer Johnson; United States	Yang Chuan-Kwang; Formosa	Vasili Kuznetsov; Soviet Union

=== Women’s events ===
Event	Gold	Silver	Bronze
100 m	Wilma Rudolph; United States	Dorothy Hyman; Great Britain	Giuseppina Leone; Italy
200 m	Wilma Rudolph; United States	Jutta Heine; United Team of Germany	Dorothy Hyman; Great Britain
800 m	Lyudmila Shevtsova; Soviet Union	Brenda Jones; Australia	Ursula Donath; United Team of Germany
80 m hurdles	Irina Press; Soviet Union	Carole Quinton; Great Britain	Gisela Birkemeyer; United Team of Germany
4 × 100 m relay	United States; Martha Hudson; Lucinda Williams; Barbara Jones; Wilma Rudolph	United Team of Germany; Martha Langbein; Anni Biechl; Brunhilde Hendrix; Jutta Heine	Poland; Teresa Wieczorek; Barbara Janiszewska; Celina Jesionowska; Halina Richter
high jump	Iolanda Balaş (ROU)	Jarosława Jóźwiakowska (POL)	NONE AWARDED
high jump	Iolanda Balaş (ROU)	Dorothy Shirley (GBR)	NONE AWARDED
long jump	Vera Krepkina (URS)	Elżbieta Krzesińska (POL)	Hildrun Claus (EUA)
shot put	Tamara Press; Soviet Union	Johanna Lüttge; United Team of Germany	Earlene Brown; United States
discus throw	Nina Ponomaryova; Soviet Union	Tamara Press; Soviet Union	Lia Manoliu; Romania
javelin throw	Elvīra Ozoliņa; Soviet Union	Dana Zátopková; Czechoslovakia	Birutė Kalėdienė; Soviet Union

== Basketball ==
Event	Gold	Silver	Bronze
Men's	United States; Jay Arnette; Walt Bellamy; Bob Boozer; Terry Dischinger; Burdette Haldorson; Darrall Imhoff; Allen Kelley; Lester Lane; Jerry Lucas; Oscar Robertson; Adrian Smith; Jerry West	Soviet Union; Yuri Korneev; Jānis Krūmiņš; Guram Minashvili; Valdis Muižnieks; Cesars Ozers; Aleksandr Petrov; Mikhail Semyonov; Vladimir Ugrekhelidze; Maigonis Valdmanis; Albert Valtin; Gennadi Volnov; Viktor Zubkov	Brazil; Edson Bispo dos Santos; Moyses Blas; Waldemar Blatskauskas; Algodão; Carmo de Souza; Carlos Domingos Massoni; Waldyr Geraldo Boccardo; Wlamir Marques; Amaury Antônio Pasos; Fernando Pereira De Freitas; Antonio Salvador Sucar; Eduardo Schall Jatyr

== Boxing ==
Event	Gold	Silver	Bronze
Flyweight	Gyula Török; Hungary	Sergei Sivko; Soviet Union	Abdel Moneim El-Guindi; Egypt
Flyweight	Gyula Török; Hungary	Sergei Sivko; Soviet Union	Kiyoshi Tanabe; Japan
Bantamweight	Oleg Grigoryev; Soviet Union	Primo Zamparini; Italy	Brunon Bendig; Poland
Bantamweight	Oleg Grigoryev; Soviet Union	Primo Zamparini; Italy	Oliver Taylor; Australia
Featherweight	Francesco Musso; Italy	Jerzy Adamski; Poland	William Meyers; South Africa
Featherweight	Francesco Musso; Italy	Jerzy Adamski; Poland	Jorma Limmonen; Finland
Lightweight	Kazimierz Paździor; Poland	Sandro Lopopolo; Italy	Richard McTaggart; Great Britain
Lightweight	Kazimierz Paździor; Poland	Sandro Lopopolo; Italy	Abel Laudonio; Argentina
Light welterweight	Bohumil Němeček; Czechoslovakia	Clement Quartey; Ghana	Quincey Daniels; United States
Light welterweight	Bohumil Němeček; Czechoslovakia	Clement Quartey; Ghana	Marian Kasprzyk; Poland
Welterweight	Giovanni Benvenuti; Italy	Yuri Radonyak; Soviet Union	Leszek Drogosz; Poland
Welterweight	Giovanni Benvenuti; Italy	Yuri Radonyak; Soviet Union	Jimmy Lloyd; Great Britain
Light middleweight	Wilbert McClure; United States	Carmelo Bossi; Italy	William Fisher; Great Britain
Light middleweight	Wilbert McClure; United States	Carmelo Bossi; Italy	Boris Lagutin; Soviet Union
Middleweight	Eddie Crook, Jr. United States	Tadeusz Walasek; Poland	Yevgeny Feofanov; Soviet Union
Middleweight	Eddie Crook, Jr. United States	Tadeusz Walasek; Poland	Ion Monea; Romania
Light heavyweight	Cassius Clay; United States	Zbigniew Pietrzykowski; Poland	Anthony Madigan; Australia
Light heavyweight	Cassius Clay; United States	Zbigniew Pietrzykowski; Poland	Giulio Saraudi; Italy
Heavyweight	Franco De Piccoli; Italy	Daniel Bekker; South Africa	Josef Němec; Czechoslovakia
Heavyweight	Franco De Piccoli; Italy	Daniel Bekker; South Africa	Günter Siegmund; United Team of Germany

== Canoeing ==
=== Men’s events ===
Event	Gold	Silver	Bronze
C-1 1000 m	János Parti (HUN)	Aleksandr Silayev (URS)	Leon Rotman (ROU)
C-2 1000 m	Leonid Geishtor and Sergei Makarenko (URS)	Aldo Dezi and Francesco La Macchia (ITA)	Imre Farkas and András Törő (HUN)
K-1 1000 m	Erik Hansen (DEN)	Imre Szöllősi (HUN)	Gert Fredriksson (SWE)
K-2 1000 m	Gert Fredriksson and Sven-Olov Sjödelius (SWE)	György Mészáros and András Szente (HUN)	Stefan Kapłaniak and Władysław Zieliński (POL)
K-1 4 x 500 m	United Team of Germany; Dieter Krause; Günther Perleberg; Paul Lange; Friedhelm Wentzke	Hungary; Imre Szöllősi; Imre Kemecsey; András Szente; György Mészáros	Denmark; Erik Hansen; Helmuth Sørensen; Arne Høyer; Erling Jessen

=== Women’s events ===
Event	Gold	Silver	Bronze
K-1 500 m	Antonina Seredina (URS)	Therese Zenz (EUA)	Daniela Walkowiak (POL)
K-2 500 m	Mariya Shubina and Antonina Seredina (URS)	Therese Zenz and Ingrid Hartmann (EUA)	Klára Fried-Bánfalvi and Vilma Egresi (HUN)

== Cycling ==
Event	Gold	Silver	Bronze
road race	Viktor Kapitonov (URS)	Livio Trapè (ITA)	Willy van den Berghen (BEL)
team time trial	Italy; Antonio Bailetti; Ottavio Cogliati; Giacomo Fornoni; Livio Trapè	United Team of Germany; Gustav-Adolf Schur; Egon Adler; Erich Hagen; Günter Lörke	Soviet Union; Viktor Kapitonov; Yevgeny Klevtsov; Yury Melikhov; Aleksei Petrov
sprint	Sante Gaiardoni (ITA)	Leo Sterckx (BEL)	Valentino Gasparella (ITA)
time trial	Sante Gaiardoni (ITA)	Dieter Gieseler (EUA)	Rostislav Vargashkin (URS)
tandem	Giuseppe Beghetto and Sergio Bianchetto (ITA)	Jürgen Simon and Lothar Stäber (EUA)	Vladimir Leonov and Boris Vasilyev (URS)
team pursuit	Italy; Luigi Arienti; Franco Testa; Mario Vallotto; Marino Vigna	United Team of Germany; Peter Gröning; Manfred Klieme; Siegfried Köhler; Bernd Barleben	Soviet Union; Stanislav Moskvin; Viktor Romanov; Leonid Kolumbet; Arnold Belgardt

== Diving ==
Event	Gold	Silver	Bronze
Men's 3 m springboard	Gary Tobian (USA)	Samuel Hall (USA)	Juan Botella (MEX)
Men's 10 m platform	Bob Webster (USA)	Gary Tobian (USA)	Brian Phelps (GBR)
Women's 3 m springboard	Ingrid Krämer (EUA)	Paula Pope (USA)	Elizabeth Ferris (GBR)
Women's 10 m platform	Ingrid Krämer (EUA)	Paula Pope (USA)	Ninel Krutova (URS)

== Equestrian ==
Event	Gold	Silver	Bronze
Individual dressage	Sergei Filatov; Soviet Union	Gustav Fischer; Switzerland	Josef Neckermann; United Team of Germany
Individual eventing	Lawrence Morgan; Australia	Neale Lavis; Australia	Anton Bühler; Switzerland
Team eventing	Australia; Lawrence Morgan; Neale Lavis; Bill Roycroft	Switzerland; Anton Bühler; Hans Schwarzenbach; Rudolf Günthardt	France; Jack Le Goff; Guy Lefrant; Jéhan Le Roy
Individual jumping	Raimondo D'Inzeo; Italy	Piero D'Inzeo; Italy	David Broome; Great Britain
Team jumping	United Team of Germany; Hans Günter Winkler; Fritz Thiedemann; Alwin Schockemöhle	United States; Frank Chapot; William Steinkraus; George H. Morris	Italy; Raimondo D'Inzeo; Piero D'Inzeo; Antonio Oppes

== Fencing ==
=== Men’s events ===
Event	Gold	Silver	Bronze
épée	Giuseppe Delfino; Italy	Allan Jay; Great Britain	Bruno Khabarov; Soviet Union
team épée	Italy; Giuseppe Delfino; Alberto Pellegrino; Carlo Pavesi; Edoardo Mangiarotti; Fiorenzo Marini; Gianluigi Saccaro	Great Britain; Allan Jay; Michael Howard; John Pelling; Henry Hoskyns; Raymond Harrison; Michael Alexander	Soviet Union; Valentin Chernikov; Guram Kostava; Arnold Chernushevich; Bruno Khabarov; Aleksandr Pavlovsky*
foil	Viktor Zhdanovich; Soviet Union	Yuri Sisikin; Soviet Union	Albert Axelrod; United States
team foil	Soviet Union; Viktor Zhdanovich; Mark Midler; Yuri Rudov; Yuri Sisikin; German Sveshnikov	Italy; Alberto Pellegrino; Luigi Carpaneda; Mario Curletto; Aldo Aureggi; Edoardo Mangiarotti	United Team of Germany; Jürgen Theuerkauff; Tim Gerresheim; Eberhard Mehl; Jürgen Brecht
sabre	Rudolf Kárpáti; Hungary	Zoltán Horváth; Hungary	Wladimiro Calarese; Italy
team sabre	Hungary; Tamas Mendelenyi; Rudolf Kárpáti; Pál Kovács; Zoltán Horváth; Gabor Delneki; Aladár Gerevich	Poland; Andrzej Piatkowski; Emil Ochyra; Wojciech Zabłocki; Jerzy Pawłowski; Ryszard Zub; Marian Kuszewski	Italy; Wladimiro Calarese; Giampaolo Calanchini; Pierluigi Chicca; Roberto Ferrari; Mario Ravagnan

=== Women’s events ===
Event	Gold	Silver	Bronze
foil	Adelheid Schmid; United Team of Germany	Valentina Rastvorova; Soviet Union	Maria Vicol; Romania
team foil	Soviet Union; Valentina Prudskova; Aleksandra Zabelina; Lyudmila Shishova; Tatyana Petrenko; Galina Gorokhova; Valentina Rastvorova	Hungary; Györgyi Szekely-Marvalics; Ildikó Újlaky-Rejtő; Magdolna Nyari-Kovacs; Katalin Juhasz-Nagy; Lidia Dömölki-Sakovics	Italy; Bruna Colombetti; Velleda Cesari; Claudia Pasini; Irene Camber; Antonella Ragno-Lonzi

== Field hockey ==
Event	Gold	Silver	Bronze
Men's	Pakistan; Abdul Rashid; Bashir Ahmad; Manzoor Hussain Atif; Ghulam Rasul; Anwar Khan; Habib Ali Kiddie; Noor Alam; Abdul Hamid; Abdul Waheed; Naseer Bunda; Motiullah; Mushtaq Ahmad; Khursheed Aslam	India; Shankar Lakshman; Prithipal Singh; Jaman Lal Sharma; Leslie Claudius; Joseph Antic; Mohinder Lal; Joginder Singh; John Peter; Jaswant Singh; Udham Singh Kullar; Raghbir Singh Bhola; Charanjit Singh; Govind Sawant	Spain; Carlos Iglesias; José Colomer; Rafael Egusquiza; Juan Calzado; José Dinares; Narciso Ventalló; Ignacio Macaya; Eduardo Dualde; Pedro Murúa; Joaquín Dualde; Pedro Amat; Francisco Caballer; Luis Usoz; Pedro Roig

== Football ==
Event	Gold	Silver	Bronze
Men's	Yugoslavia; Andrija Anković; Vladimir Durković; Milan Galić; Fahrudin Jusufi; Tomislav Knez; Borivoje Kostić; Aleksandar Kozlina; Dušan Maravić; Željko Matuš; Željko Perušić; Novak Roganović; Velimir Sombolac; Milutin Šoškić; Silvester Takač; Blagoje Vidinić; Ante Žanetić	Denmark; Poul Andersen; John Danielsen; Henning Enoksen; Henry From; Bent Hansen; Poul Jensen; Hans Nielsen; Harald Nielsen; Flemming Nielsen; Poul Pedersen; Jørn Sørensen; Tommy Troelsen	Hungary; Flórián Albert; Jenő Dalnoki; Zoltán Dudás; János Dunai; Lajos Faragó; János Göröcs; Ferenc Kovács; Dezső Novák; Pál Orosz; Laszlo Pál; Tibor Pál; Gyula Rákosi; Imre Sátori; Ernő Solymosi; Gábor Török; Pál Várhidi; Oszkár Vilezsál

== Gymnastics ==
=== Men’s events ===
Event	Gold	Silver	Bronze
individual all-around	Boris Shakhlin (URS)	Takashi Ono (JPN)	Yuri Titov (URS)
team all-around	Japan; Nobuyuki Aihara; Yukio Endo; Takashi Mitsukuri; Takashi Ono; Masao Takemoto; Shuji Tsurumi	Soviet Union; Albert Azaryan; Valery Kerdemilidi; Nikolai Miligulo; Vladimir Portnoi; Boris Shakhlin; Yuri Titov	Italy; Giovanni Carminucci; Pasquale Carminucci; Gianfranco Marzolla; Franco Menichelli; Orlando Polmonari; Angelo Vicardi
floor exercise	Nobuyuki Aihara; Japan	Yuri Titov; Soviet Union	Franco Menichelli; Italy
horizontal bar	Takashi Ono; Japan	Masao Takemoto; Japan	Boris Shakhlin; Soviet Union
parallel bars	Boris Shakhlin; Soviet Union	Giovanni Carminucci; Italy	Takashi Ono; Japan
pommel horse	Eugen Ekman; Finland	NONE AWARDED	Shuji Tsurumi; Japan
pommel horse	Boris Shakhlin; Soviet Union	NONE AWARDED	Shuji Tsurumi; Japan
rings	Albert Asaryan; Soviet Union	Boris Shakhlin; Soviet Union	Takashi Ono; Japan
rings	Albert Asaryan; Soviet Union	Boris Shakhlin; Soviet Union	Velik Kapsazov; Bulgaria
vault	Boris Shakhlin; Soviet Union	NONE AWARDED	Vladimir Portnoi; Soviet Union
vault	Takashi Ono; Japan	NONE AWARDED	Vladimir Portnoi; Soviet Union

=== Women’s events ===
Event	Gold	Silver	Bronze
individual all-around	Larisa Latynina (URS)	Sofia Muratova (URS)	Polina Astakhova (URS)
team all-around	Soviet Union; Polina Astakhova; Lidia Ivanova; Larisa Latynina; Tamara Lyukhina; Sofia Muratova; Margarita Nikolaeva	Czechoslovakia; Eva Bosáková; Věra Čáslavská; Matylda Matoušková; Hana Růžičková; Ludmila Švédová; Adolfína Tkačíková	Romania; Atanasia Ionescu; Sonia Iovan; Elena Leuşteanu; Emilia Vătăşoiu-Liţă; Elena Niculescu; Uta Poreceanu
balance beam	Eva Bosáková; Czechoslovakia	Larisa Latynina; Soviet Union	Sofia Muratova; Soviet Union
floor exercise	Larisa Latynina; Soviet Union	Polina Astakhova; Soviet Union	Tamara Lyukhina; Soviet Union
uneven bars	Polina Astakhova; Soviet Union	Larisa Latynina; Soviet Union	Tamara Lyukhina; Soviet Union
vault	Margarita Nikolaeva; Soviet Union	Sofia Muratova; Soviet Union	Larisa Latynina; Soviet Union

== Modern pentathlon ==
Event	Gold	Silver	Bronze
individual	Ferenc Németh (HUN)	Imre Nagy (HUN)	Robert Beck (USA)
team	Hungary; Imre Nagy; András Balczó; Ferenc Németh	Soviet Union; Nikolai Tatarinov; Hanno Selg; Igor Novikov	United States; Robert Beck; Jack Daniels; George Lambert

== Rowing ==
Event	Gold	Silver	Bronze
single sculls	Vyacheslav Ivanov (URS)	Achim Hill (EUA)	Teodor Kocerka (POL)
double sculls	Václav Kozák and Pavel Schmidt (TCH)	Aleksandr Berkutov and Yuriy Tyukalov (URS)	Ernst Hürlimann and Rolf Larcher (SUI)
Coxless pair	Valentin Boreyko and Oleg Golovanov (URS)	Josef Kloimstein and Alfred Sageder (AUT)	Veli Lehtelä and Toimi Pitkänen (FIN)
Coxed pair	United Team of Germany; Bernhard Knubel; Heinz Renneberg; Klaus Zerta	Soviet Union; Antanas Bagdonavičius; Zigmas Jukna; Igor Rudakov	United States; Richard Draeger; Conn Findlay; Kent Mitchell
Coxless four	United States; Arthur Ayrault; Ted Nash; John Sayre; Rusty Wailes	Italy; Tullio Baraglia; Renato Bosatta; Giancarlo Crosta; Giuseppe Galante	Soviet Union; Igor Akhremchik; Yuriy Bachurov; Valentin Morkovkin; Anatoly Tarabrin
coxed four	United Team of Germany; Gerd Cintl; Horst Effertz; Klaus Riekemann; Jürgen Litz; Michael Obst	France; Robert Dumontois; Claude Martin; Jacques Morel; Guy Nosbaum; Jean Klein	Italy; Fulvio Balatti; Romano Sgheiz; Franco Trincavelli; Giovanni Zucchi; Ivo Stefanoni
eight	United Team of Germany; Manfred Rulffs; Walter Schröder; Frank Schepke; Kraft Schepke; Karl-Heinrich von Groddeck; Karl-Heinz Hopp; Klaus Bittner; Hans Lenk; Willi Padge	Canada; Donald Arnold; Walter D'Hondt; Nelson Kuhn; John Lecky; Lorne Loomer; Archibald MacKinnon; Bill McKerlich; Glen Mervyn; Sohen Biln	Czechoslovakia; Bohumil Janoušek; Jan Jindra; Jiří Lundák; Stanislav Lusk; Václav Pavkovič; Luděk Pojezný; Jan Švéda; Josef Věntus; Miroslav Koníček

== Sailing ==
Event	Gold	Silver	Bronze
Finn	Paul Elvstrøm (DEN)	Aleksander Tšutšelov (URS)	André Nelis (BEL)
Flying Dutchman	Norway; Peder Lunde Jr. Bjørn Bergvall	Denmark; Hans Fogh; Ole Erik Petersen	United Team of Germany; Rolf Mulka; Ingo Von Bredow
Star	Soviet Union; Timir Pinegin; Fyodor Shutkov	Portugal; Mario Gentil; Jose Gentil	United States; William Parks; Robert Halperin
Dragon	Greece; HRH Crown Prince Constantine; Odysseus Eskidioglou; Georgios Zaimis	Argentina; Jorge Salas Chávez; Héctor Calegaris; Jorge del Río Sálas	Italy; Antonio Cosentino; Antonio Ciciliano; Giulio De Stefano
5.5 Metre	United States; George O'Day; James Hunt; David Smith	Denmark; William Berntsen; Sören Hancke; Steen Christensen	Switzerland; Henri Copponex; Manfred Metzger; Pierre Girard

== Shooting ==
Event	Gold	Silver	Bronze
25 m rapid fire pistol	William McMillan; United States	Pentti Linnosvuo; Finland	Alexander Zabelin; Soviet Union
50 m pistol	Alexey Gushchin; Soviet Union	Makhmud Umarov; Soviet Union	Yoshihisa Yoshikawa; Japan
50 m rifle three positions	Viktor Shamburkin; Soviet Union	Marat Niyazov; Soviet Union	Klaus Zähringer; United Team of Germany
50 m rifle prone	Peter Kohnke; United Team of Germany	James Enoch Hill; United States	Enrico Forcella Pelliccioni; Venezuela
300 m rifle three positions	Hubert Hammerer; Austria	Hans Rudolf Spillmann; Switzerland	Vasily Borisov; Soviet Union
Trap	Ion Dumitrescu; Romania	Galliano Rossini; Italy	Sergei Kalinin; Soviet Union

== Swimming ==
=== Men’s events ===
Event	Gold	Silver	Bronze
100 m freestyle	John Devitt; Australia	Lance Larson; United States	Manuel dos Santos; Brazil
400 m freestyle	Murray Rose; Australia	Tsuyoshi Yamanaka; Japan	John Konrads; Australia
1500 m freestyle	John Konrads; Australia	Murray Rose; Australia	George Breen; United States
100 m backstroke	David Theile; Australia	Frank McKinney; United States	Bob Bennett; United States
200 m breaststroke	Bill Mulliken; United States	Yoshihiko Osaki; Japan	Wieger Mensonides; Netherlands
200 m butterfly	Mike Troy; United States	Neville Hayes; Australia	Dave Gillanders; United States
4 × 200 m freestyle relay	United States; George Harrison; Dick Blick; Mike Troy; Jeff Farrell	Japan; Makoto Fukui; Hiroshi Ishii; Tsuyoshi Yamanaka; Tatsuo Fujimoto	Australia; David Dickson; John Devitt; Murray Rose; John Konrads
4 × 100 m medley relay	United States; Frank McKinney; Paul Hait; Lance Larson; Jeff Farrell	Australia; David Theile; Terry Gathercole; Neville Hayes; Geoff Shipton	Japan; Kazuo Tomita; Koichi Hirakida; Yoshihiko Osaki; Keigo Shimuzu

=== Women’s events ===
Event	Gold	Silver	Bronze
100 m freestyle	Dawn Fraser; Australia	Chris von Saltza; United States	Natalie Steward; Great Britain
400 m freestyle	Chris von Saltza; United States	Jane Cederqvist; Sweden	Tineke Lagerberg; Netherlands
100 m backstroke	Lynn Burke; United States	Natalie Steward; Great Britain	Satoko Tanaka; Japan
200 m breaststroke	Anita Lonsbrough; Great Britain	Wiltrud Urselmann; United Team of Germany	Barbara Göbel; United Team of Germany
100 m butterfly	Carolyn Schuler; United States	Marianne Heemskerk; Netherlands	Jan Andrew; Australia
4 × 100 m freestyle relay	United States; Joan Spillane; Shirley Stobs; Carolyn Wood; Chris von Saltza	Australia; Dawn Fraser; Ilsa Konrads; Lorraine Crapp; Alva Colquhoun	United Team of Germany; Christel Steffin; Heidi Pechstein; Gisela Weiss; Ursel Brunner
4 × 100 m medley relay	United States; Lynn Burke; Patty Kempner; Carolyn Schuler; Chris von Saltza	Australia; Marilyn Wilson; Rosemary Lassig; Jan Andrew; Dawn Fraser	United Team of Germany; Ingrid Schmidt; Ursula Küper; Bärbel Fuhrmann; Ursel Brunner

== Water polo ==
Event	Gold	Silver	Bronze
Men's	Italy; Amedeo Ambron; Danio Bardi; Giuseppe D'Altrui; Salvatore Gionta; Giancarlo Guerrini; Franco Lavoratori; Gianni Lonzi; Luigi Mannelli; Rosario Parmegiani; Eraldo Pizzo; Dante Rossi; Brunello Spinelli	Soviet Union; Viktor Ageev; Givi Chikvanaia; Leri Gogoladze; Boris Goykhman; Yury Grigorovsky; Anatoly Kartashov; Vyacheslav Kurennoy; P'et're Mshveniyeradze; Vladimir Novikov; Yevgeny Saltsyn; Vladimir Semyonov	Hungary; András Bodnár; Ottó Boros; Zoltán Dömötör; László Felkai; Dezső Gyarmati; István Hevesi; László Jeney; Tivadar Kanizsa; György Kárpáti; András Katona; János Konrád; Kálmán Markovits; Mihály Mayer; Péter Rusorán

== Weightlifting ==
Event	Gold	Silver	Bronze
bantamweight	Charles Vinci; United States	Yoshinobu Miyake; Japan	Esmaeil Elmkhah; Iran
featherweight	Yevgeni Minaev; Soviet Union	Isaac Berger; United States	Sebastiano Mannironi; Italy
lightweight	Viktor Bushuev; Soviet Union	Tan Howe Liang; Singapore	Abdul Wahid Aziz; Iraq
middleweight	Aleksandr Kurynov; Soviet Union	Tommy Kono; United States	Győző Veres; Hungary
light heavyweight	Ireneusz Paliński; Poland	Jim George; United States	Jan Bochenek; Poland
middle heavyweight	Arkadi Vorobyev; Soviet Union	Trofim Lomakin; Soviet Union	Louis Martin; Great Britain
heavyweight	Yury Vlasov; Soviet Union	James Bradford; United States	Norbert Schemansky; United States

== Wrestling ==
=== Freestyle ===
Event	Gold	Silver	Bronze
flyweight	Ahmet Bilek; Turkey	Masayuki Matsubara; Japan	Ebrahim Seifpour; Iran
bantamweight	Terrence McCann; United States	Nezhdet Zalev; Bulgaria	Tadeusz Trojanowski; Poland
featherweight	Mustafa Dağıstanlı; Turkey	Stancho Kolev; Bulgaria	Vladimir Rubashvili; Soviet Union
lightweight	Shelby Wilson; United States	Vladimir Synyavsky; Soviet Union	Enyu Valchev; Bulgaria
welterweight	Douglas Blubaugh; United States	İsmail Ogan; Turkey	Muhammad Bashir; Pakistan
middleweight	Hasan Güngör; Turkey	Georgy Skhirtladze; Soviet Union	Hans Antonsson; Sweden
light heavyweight	Ismet Atli; Turkey	Gholamreza Takhti; Iran	Anatoli Albul; Soviet Union
heavyweight	Wilfried Dietrich; United Team of Germany	Hamit Kaplan; Turkey	Savkuds Dzarasov; Soviet Union

=== Greco-Roman ===
Event	Gold	Silver	Bronze
flyweight	Dumitru Pârvulescu; Romania	Osman El-Sayed; Egypt	Mohammad Paziraei; Iran
bantamweight	Oleg Karavayev; Soviet Union	Ion Cernea; Romania	Dinko Petrov; Bulgaria
featherweight	Müzahir Sille; Turkey	Imre Polyák; Hungary	Konstantin Vyrupayev; Soviet Union
lightweight	Avtandil Koridze; Soviet Union	Branislav Martinović; Yugoslavia	Gustav Freij; Sweden
welterweight	Mithat Bayrak; Turkey	Günther Maritschnigg; United Team of Germany	René Schiermeyer; France
middleweight	Dimitar Dobrev; Bulgaria	Lothar Metz; United Team of Germany	Ion Țăranu; Romania
light heavyweight	Tevfik Kis; Turkey	Krali Bimbalov; Bulgaria	Givi Kartoziya; Soviet Union
heavyweight	Ivan Bogdan; Soviet Union	Wilfried Dietrich; United Team of Germany	Bohumil Kubát; Czechoslovakia

== Medal leaders ==
Athletes that won at least three total medals are listed below.

Athlete	Nation	Sport	Gold	Silver	Bronze	Total
Boris Shakhlin	Soviet Union	Gymnastics	4	2	1	7
Larisa Latynina	Soviet Union	Gymnastics	3	2	1	6
Takashi Ono	Japan	Gymnastics	3	1	2	6
Chris von Saltza	United States	Swimming	3	1	0	4
Polina Astakhova	Soviet Union	Gymnastics	2	1	1	4
Sofia Muratova	Soviet Union	Swimming	1	2	1	4
Wilma Rudolph	United States	Athletics	3	0	0	3
Dawn Fraser	Australia	Swimming	1	2	0	3
Murray Rose	Australia	Swimming	1	1	1	3
Tamara Lyukhina	Soviet Union	Gymnastics	1	0	2	3
John Konrads	Australia	Swimming	1	0	2	3
Yuri Titov	Soviet Union	Gymnastics	0	2	1	3

== See also ==
- 1960 Summer Olympics medal table
