= Cycling at the 1960 Summer Olympics =

Cycling at the Games of the XVII Olympiad
- Venues: Via Cassia; Via Cristoforo Colombo; Via di Grottarossa; Via Flaminia; Olympic Velodrome
- Date: 26 –29 August 1960
- Competitors: 297 from 48 nations

The cycling competition at the 1960 Summer Olympics consisted of two road cycling events and four track cycling events, all for men only. The event was marred by the death of cyclist Knud Jensen.

== Medal summary ==
=== Road cycling ===
Games	Gold	Silver	Bronze
Individual road race	Viktor Kapitonov; Soviet Union	Livio Trapè; Italy	Willy van den Berghen; Belgium
Time trial, team	Italy; Livio Trapè; Antonio Bailetti; Ottavio Cogliati; Giacomo Fornoni	United Team of Germany; Gustav-Adolf Schur; Egon Adler; Erich Hagen; Günter Lörke	Soviet Union; Aleksei Petrov; Viktor Kapitonov; Yevgeny Klevtsov; Yury Melikhov

=== Track cycling ===
Games	Gold	Silver	Bronze
Pursuit, team	Italy; Marino Vigna; Luigi Arienti; Franco Testa; Mario Vallotto	United Team of Germany; Siegfried Köhler; Bernd Barleben; Peter Gröning; Manfred Klieme	Soviet Union; Viktor Romanov; Arnold Belgardt; Leonid Kolumbet; Stanislav Moskvin
Sprint	Sante Gaiardoni; Italy	Leo Sterckx; Belgium	Valentino Gasparella; Italy
Tandem	Giuseppe Beghetto and Sergio Bianchetto; Italy	Jürgen Simon and Lothar Stäber; United Team of Germany	Vladimir Leonov and Boris Vasilyev; Soviet Union
Time trial	Sante Gaiardoni; Italy	Dieter Gieseler; United Team of Germany	Rostislav Vargashkin; Soviet Union

== Participating nations ==
297 cyclists from 48 nations competed.

- Argentina (8)
- Australia (9)
- Austria (8)
- Belgium (13)
- Brazil (1)
- British West Indies (1)
- Bulgaria (5)
- Canada (2)
- Ceylon (1)
- Colombia (7)
- Czechoslovakia (6)
- Denmark (8)
- Ethiopia (5)
- Finland (4)
- France (14)
- United Team of Germany (14)
- Great Britain (12)
- Hungary (5)
- Indonesia (4)
- Iraq (2)
- Ireland (5)
- Israel (2)
- Italy (14)
- Japan (5)
- South Korea (4)
- Liechtenstein (1)
- Luxembourg (6)
- Malta (3)
- Mexico (10)
- Morocco (4)
- Netherlands (13)
- New Zealand (1)
- Norway (1)
- Pakistan (2)
- Poland (5)
- Portugal (4)
- Romania (6)
- San Marino (4)
- South Africa (5)
- Soviet Union (13)
- Spain (9)
- Sweden (4)
- Switzerland (14)
- Tunisia (4)
- United States (14)
- Uruguay (5)
- Venezuela (5)
- Yugoslavia (5)

== Medal table ==
Rank	Nation	Gold	Silver	Bronze	Total
1	Italy	5	1	1	7
2	Soviet Union	1	0	4	5
3	United Team of Germany	0	4	0	4
4	Belgium	0	1	1	2
Totals (4 entries)		6	6	6	18
