= Chronological summary of the 1960 Summer Olympics =

Overview of the 1960 Summer Olympics

This page contains a chronological summary of major events from the 1960 Summer Olympics in Rome.

== Calendar ==
OC	Opening ceremony	●	Event competitions	1	Gold medal events	CC	Closing ceremony

August / September	25 Thu	26 Fri	27 Sat	28 Sun	29 Mon	30 Tue	31 Wed	1 Thu	2 Fri	3 Sat	4 Sun	5 Mon	6 Tue	7 Wed	8 Thu	9 Fri	10 Sat	11 Sun	Events
Ceremonies	OC																	CC	—N/a
Athletics							2	4	7	3		3	4	4	6		1		34
Basketball		●	●		●			●	●	●				●	●	●	1		1
Boxing	●	●	●		●	●	●	●	●	●		10							10
Canoeing		●	●		7														7
Cycling		2	1		2	1													6
Diving		●	1		1	1	●	●	1										4
Equestrian												●	1	1	●	●	2	1	5
Fencing					●	1	●	1	1	1		●	1	●	1	1	1		8
Field hockey		●	●		●	●	●	●	●	●	●	●	●	●	●	1	●	●	1
Football		●			●			●				●	●			●	1		1
Gymnastics												●	●	2	2	4	6		14
Modern pentathlon	●	●	●		●	●	2												2
Rowing						●	●	●	●	7									7
Sailing					●	●	●	●				●	●	5					5
Shooting										●		1	1	●	1	2	1		6
Swimming		●	2		1	2	2	3	2	3									15
Water polo	●	●	●		●	●	●	●	●	1									1
Weightlifting														2	2	2	1		7
Wrestling		●	●		●	●	8	●	●	●		●	8						16
Daily medal events		2	4	0	11	5	14	8	11	15	0	14	15	14	12	10	14	1	150
Cumulative total		2	6	6	17	22	36	44	55	70	70	84	99	113	125	135	149	150	150
August / September	25 Thu	26 Fri	27 Sat	28 Sun	29 Mon	30 Tue	31 Wed	1 Thu	2 Fri	3 Sat	4 Sun	5 Mon	6 Tue	7 Wed	8 Thu	9 Fri	10 Sat	11 Sun	Total events

=== Day 1: Thu 25 August ===
No medal events

=== Day 2: Fri 26 August ===
Gold medalists
Sport	Event	Competitor(s)	NOC	Rec	Ref
Cycling	100 km team time trial	Antonio Bailetti, Ottavio Cogliati, Giacomo Fornoni, Livio Trapè	Italy		
Cycling	1 km track time trial	Sante Gaiardoni	Italy	WR	

=== Day 3: Sat 27 August ===
Gold medalists
Sport	Event	Competitor(s)	NOC	Rec	Ref
Cycling	Tandem	Giuseppe Beghetto, Sergio Bianchetto	Italy		
Diving	Women's 3 metre springboard	Ingrid Krämer	United Team of Germany		
Swimming	Men's 100 metre freestyle	John Devitt	Australia	OR	
Swimming	Women's 200 metre breaststroke	Anita Lonsbrough	Great Britain	WR	

=== Day 4: Sun 28 August ===
No events

=== Day 5: Mon 29 August ===
Gold medalists
Sport	Event	Competitor(s)	NOC	Rec	Ref
Canoeing	Men's K-1 1000 metres	Erik Hansen	Denmark		
Canoeing	Men's C-1 1000 metres	János Parti	Hungary		
Canoeing	Men's K-2 1000 metres	Gert Fredriksson, Sven-Olov Sjödelius	Sweden		
Canoeing	Men's C-2 1000 metres	Leonid Geishtor, Sergei Makarenko	Soviet Union		
Canoeing	Women's K-1 500 metres	Antonina Seredina	Soviet Union		
Canoeing	Women's K-2 500 metres	Mariya Shubina, Antonina Seredina	Soviet Union		
Canoeing	Men's K-1 4 × 500 metres	Paul Lange, Günther Perleberg, Friedhelm Wentzke, Dieter Krause	United Team of Germany		
Cycling	Team pursuit	Marino Vigna, Luigi Arienti, Franco Testa, Mario Vallotto	Italy		
Cycling	Sprint	Sante Gaiardoni	Italy		
Diving	Men's 3 metre springboard	Gary Tobian	United States		
Swimming	Women's 100 metre freestyle	Dawn Fraser	Australia	OR	

=== Day 6: Tue 30 August ===
Gold medalists
Sport	Event	Competitor(s)	NOC	Rec	Ref
Cycling	Individual road race	Viktor Kapitonov	Soviet Union		
Diving	Women's 10 metre platform	Ingrid Krämer	United Team of Germany		
Fencing	Men's foil	Viktor Zhdanovich	Soviet Union		
Swimming	Women's 100 metre butterfly	Carolyn Schuler	United States	OR	
Swimming	Men's 200 metre breaststroke	William Mulliken	United States		

=== Day 7: Wed 31 August ===
Gold medalists
Sport	Event	Competitor(s)	NOC	Rec	Ref
Athletics	Men's shot put	Bill Nieder	United States	OR	
Athletics	Women's long jump	Vera Kolashnikova	Soviet Union	OR	
Modern pentathlon	Men's individual	Ferenc Németh	Hungary		
Modern pentathlon	Men's team	Imre Nagy, András Balczó, Ferenc Németh	Hungary		
Swimming	Men's 400 metre freestyle	Murray Rose	Australia		
Swimming	Men's 100 metre backstroke	David Theile	Australia		
Wrestling	Greco-Roman flyweight	Dumitru Pârvulescu	Romania		
Wrestling	Greco-Roman bantamweight	Oleg Karavayev	Soviet Union		
Wrestling	Greco-Roman featherweight	Müzahir Sille	Turkey		
Wrestling	Greco-Roman lightweight	Avtandil Koridze	Soviet Union		
Wrestling	Greco-Roman welterweight	Mithat Bayrak	Turkey		
Wrestling	Greco-Roman middleweight	Dimitar Dobrev	Bulgaria		
Wrestling	Greco-Roman light heavyweight	Tevfik Kis	Turkey		
Wrestling	Greco-Roman heavyweight	Ivan Bogdan	Soviet Union		

=== Day 8: Thu 1 September ===
Gold medalists
Sport	Event	Competitor(s)	NOC	Rec	Ref
Athletics	Women's javelin throw	Elvīra Ozoliņa	Soviet Union	OR	
Athletics	Men's high jump	Robert Shavlakadze	Soviet Union	OR	
Athletics	Women's 80 metres hurdles	Irina Press	Soviet Union		
Athletics	Men's 100 metres	Armin Hary	United Team of Germany	OR	
Fencing	Women's foil	Adelheid Schmid	United Team of Germany		
Swimming	Men's 4 x 100 metre medley relay	Frank McKinney, Paul Hait, Lance Larson, Jeff Farrell	United States		
Swimming	Women's 400 metre freestyle	Chris von Saltza	United States		
Swimming	Men's 4 x 200 metre freestyle relay	George Harrison, Richard Blick, Michael Troy, Jeff Farrell	United States		

=== Day 9: Fri 2 September ===
Gold medalists
Sport	Event	Competitor(s)	NOC	Rec	Ref
Athletics	Men's 20 kilometres walk	Vladimir Golubnichy	Soviet Union		
Athletics	Men's 400 metres hurdles	Glenn Davis	United States	OR	
Athletics	Men's long jump	Ralph Boston	United States	OR	
Athletics	Women's 100 metres	Wilma Rudolph	United States		
Athletics	Women's shot put	Tamara Press	Soviet Union	OR	
Athletics	Men's 800 metres	Peter Snell	New Zealand	OR	
Athletics	Men's 5000 metres	Murray Halberg	New Zealand		
Diving	Men's 10 metre platform	Bob Webster	United States		
Fencing	Men's team foil	Viktor Zhdanovich, Mark Midler, Yuri Rudov, Yuri Sisikin, German Sveshnikov	Soviet Union		
Swimming	Men's 200 metre butterfly	Mike Troy	United States	WR	
Swimming	Women's 4 x 100 metre medley relay	Lynn Burke, Patty Kempner, Carolyn Schuler, Chris von Saltza	United States		

=== Day 10: Sat 3 September ===
Gold medalists
Sport	Event	Competitor(s)	NOC	Rec	Ref
Athletics	Men's hammer throw	Vasily Rudenkov	Soviet Union	OR	
Athletics	Men's 3000 metres steeplechase	Zdzisław Krzyszkowiak	Poland	OR	
Athletics	Men's 200 metres	Livio Berruti	Italy		
Fencing	Women's team foil	Valentina Prudskova, Aleksandra Zabelina, Lyudmila Shishova, Tatyana Petrenko, Galina Gorokhova, Valentina Rastvorova	Soviet Union		
Rowing	Single sculls	Vyacheslav Ivanov	Soviet Union		
Rowing	Double sculls	Václav Kozák, Pavel Schmidt	Czechoslovakia		
Rowing	Coxless pair	Valentin Boreyko, Oleg Golovanov	Soviet Union		
Rowing	Coxed pair	Bernhard Knubel, Heinz Renneberg, Klaus Zerta	United Team of Germany		
Rowing	Coxless four	Dan Ayrault, Ted Nash, John Sayre, Rusty Wailes	United States		
Rowing	Coxed four	Gerd Cintl, Horst Effertz, Klaus Riekemann, Jürgen Litz, Michael Obst	United Team of Germany		
Rowing	Eight	Manfred Rulffs, Walter Schröder, Frank Schepke, Kraft Schepke, Karl-Heinrich von Groddeck, Karl-Heinz Hopp, Klaus Bittner, Hans Lenk, Willi Padge	United Team of Germany		
Swimming	Women's 100 metre backstroke	Lynn Burke	United States		
Swimming	Men's 1500 metre freestyle	John Konrads	Australia		
Swimming	Women's 4 × 100 metre freestyle relay	Joan Spillane, Shirley Stobs, Carolyn Wood, Chris von Saltza, Donna de Varona*, Susan Doerr*, Sylvia Ruuska*, Molly Botkin*	United States		
Water polo	Men's tournament	Amedeo Ambron, Danio Bardi, Giuseppe D'Altrui, Salvatore Gionta, Giancarlo Guerrini, Franco Lavoratori; Gianni Lonzi, Luigi Mannelli, Rosario Parmegiani, Eraldo Pizzo, Dante Rossi, Brunello Spinelli	Italy		

=== Day 11: Sun 4 September ===
No events

=== Day 12: Mon 5 September ===
Gold medalists
Sport	Event	Competitor(s)	NOC	Rec	Ref
Athletics	Women's discus throw	Nina Romashkova	Soviet Union	OR	
Athletics	Men's 110 metres hurdles	Lee Calhoun	United States		
Athletics	Women's 200 metres	Wilma Rudolph	United States		
Boxing	Flyweight	Gyula Török	Hungary		
Boxing	Bantamweight	Oleg Grigoryev	Soviet Union		
Boxing	Featherweight	Francesco Musso	Italy		
Boxing	Lightweight	Kazimierz Paździor	Poland		
Boxing	Light welterweight	Bohumil Němeček	Czechoslovakia		
Boxing	Welterweight	Giovanni Benvenuti	Italy		
Boxing	Light middleweight	Wilbert McClure	United States		
Boxing	Middleweight	Eddie Crook, Jr.	United States		
Boxing	Light heavyweight	Cassius Clay	United States		
Boxing	Heavyweight	Franco De Piccoli	Italy		
Shooting	300 metre rifle, three positions	Hubert Hammerer	Austria		

=== Day 13: Tue 6 September ===
Gold medalists
Sport	Event	Competitor(s)	NOC	Rec	Ref
Athletics	Men's triple jump	Józef Szmidt	Poland	OR	
Athletics	Men's 400 metres	Otis Davis	United States		
Athletics	Men's 1500 metres	Herb Elliott	Australia	WR	
Athletics	Men's decathlon	Rafer Johnson	United States	OR	
Equestrian	Individual dressage	Sergei Filatov	Soviet Union		
Fencing	Men's épée	Giuseppe Delfino	Italy		
Shooting	50 metre pistol	Alexey Gushchin	Soviet Union		
Wrestling	Freestyle flyweight	Ahmet Bilek	Turkey		
Wrestling	Freestyle bantamweight	Terrence McCann	United States		
Wrestling	Freestyle featherweight	Mustafa Dağıstanlı	Turkey		
Wrestling	Freestyle lightweight	Shelby Wilson	United States		
Wrestling	Freestyle welterweight	Douglas Blubaugh	United States		
Wrestling	Freestyle middleweight	Hasan Güngör	Turkey		
Wrestling	Freestyle light heavyweight	Ismet Atli	Turkey		
Wrestling	Freestyle heavyweight	Wilfried Dietrich	United Team of Germany		

=== Day 14: Wed 7 September ===
Gold medalists
Sport	Event	Competitor(s)	NOC	Rec	Ref
Athletics	Men's pole vault	Don Bragg	United States	OR	
Athletics	Men's 50 kilometres walk	Don Thompson	Great Britain	OR	
Athletics	Men's discus throw	Al Oerter	United States	OR	
Athletics	Women's 800 metres	Lyudmila Lysenko	Soviet Union	WR	
Equestrian	Individual jumping	Raimondo D'Inzeo	Italy		
Gymnastics	Men's individual all-around	Boris Shakhlin	Soviet Union		
Gymnastics	Men's team all-around	Takashi Ono, Nobuyuki Aihara, Yukio Endo, Takashi Mitsukuri, Masao Takemoto, Shuji Tsurumi	Japan		
Sailing	5.5 Metre	George O'Day, James Hunt, David Smith	United States		
Sailing	Flying Dutchman	Peder Lunde Jr., Bjørn Bergvall	Norway		
Sailing	Dragon	HRH Crown Prince Constantine, Odysseus Eskidioglou, Georgios Zaimis	Greece		
Sailing	Star	Timir Pinegin, Fyodor Shutkov	Soviet Union		
Sailing	Finn	Paul Elvstrøm	Denmark		
Weightlifting	Men's bantamweight	Charles Vinci	United States		
Weightlifting	Men's featherweight	Yevgeni Minaev	Soviet Union		

=== Day 15: Thu 8 September ===
Gold medalists
Sport	Event	Competitor(s)	NOC	Rec	Ref
Athletics	Women's high jump	Iolanda Balaş	Romania	OR	
Athletics	Men's javelin throw	Viktor Tsybulenko	Soviet Union		
Athletics	Men's 4 x 400 metres relay	Jack Yerman, Earl Young, Glenn Davis, Otis Davis	United States	WR	
Athletics	Men's 10,000 metres	Pyotr Bolotnikov	Soviet Union	OR	
Athletics	Women's 4 x 100 metres relay	Martha Hudson, Lucinda Williams, Barbara Jones, Wilma Rudolph	United States		
Athletics	Men's 4 x 100 metres relay	Bernd Cullmann, Armin Hary, Walter Mahlendorf, Martin Lauer	United Team of Germany		
Fencing	Men's sabre	Rudolf Kárpáti	Hungary		
Gymnastics	Women's individual all-around	Larisa Latynina	Soviet Union		
Gymnastics	Women's team all-around	Polina Astakhova, Lidia Ivanova, Larisa Latynina, Tamara Lyukhina, Sofia Muratova, Margarita Nikolaeva	Soviet Union		
Shooting	50 metre rifle three positions	Viktor Shamburkin	Soviet Union	=WR	
Weightlifting	Men's lightweight	Viktor Bushuev	Soviet Union		
Weightlifting	Men's middleweight	Aleksandr Kurynov	Soviet Union		

=== Day 16: Fri 9 September ===
Gold medalists
Sport	Event	Competitor(s)	NOC	Rec	Ref
Fencing	Men's team épée	Giuseppe Delfino, Alberto Pellegrino, Carlo Pavesi; Edoardo Mangiarotti, Fiorenzo Marini, Gianluigi Saccaro	Italy		
Field hockey	Men's tournament	Abdul Hamid, Abdul Rashid, Abdul Waheed, Bashir Ahmad, Ghulam Rasul, Anwar Khan; Khursheed Aslam, Habib Ali Kiddie, Manzoor Hussain Atif, Munir Dar, Mushtaq Ahmad, Motiullah, Naseer Bunda, Noor Alam	Pakistan		
Gymnastics	Women's uneven bars	Polina Astakhova	Soviet Union		
Gymnastics	Women's balance beam	Eva Bosáková	Czechoslovakia		
Gymnastics	Women's floor	Larisa Latynina	Soviet Union		
Gymnastics	Women's vault	Margarita Nikolaeva	Soviet Union		
Shooting	25 metre rapid fire pistol	William McMillan	United States	=OR	
Shooting	Trap	Ion Dumitrescu	Romania		
Weightlifting	Men's light heavyweight	Ireneusz Paliński	Poland		
Weightlifting	Men's middle heavyweight	Arkadi Vorobyev	Soviet Union		

=== Day 17: Sat 10 September ===
Gold medalists
Sport	Event	Competitor(s)	NOC	Rec	Ref
Athletics	Men's marathon	Abebe Bikila	Ethiopia	WR	
Basketball	Men's tournament	Jay Arnette, Walt Bellamy, Bob Boozer, Terry Dischinger, Burdette Haldorson, Darrall Imhoff, Allen Kelley, Lester Lane, Jerry Lucas, Oscar Robertson, Adrian Smith, Jerry West	United States		
Equestrian	Individual eventing	Lawrence Morgan	Australia		
Equestrian	Team eventing	Lawrence Morgan, Neale Lavis, Bill Roycroft	Australia		
Fencing	Men's team sabre	Aladár Gerevich, Rudolf Kárpáti, Pál Kovács, Zoltán Horváth, Gábor Delneky, Tamás Mendelényi	Hungary		
Football	Men's tournament	Andrija Anković, Zvonko Bego, Vladimir Durković, Milan Galić, Fahrudin Jusufi, Tomislav Knez, Bora Kostić, Aleksandar Kozlina, Dušan Maravić, Željko Matuš, Žarko Nikolić, Željko Perušić, Novak Roganović, Velimir Sombolac, Milutin Šoškić, Silvester Takač, Blagoje Vidinić, Ante Žanetić	Yugoslavia		
Gymnastics	Men's floor	Nobuyuki Aihara	Japan		
Gymnastics	Men's horizontal bar	Takashi Ono	Japan		
Gymnastics	Men's parallel bars	Boris Shakhlin	Soviet Union		
Gymnastics	Men's pommel horse	Eugen Ekman, Boris Shakhlin	Finland, Soviet Union		
Gymnastics	Men's rings	Albert Azaryan	Soviet Union		
Gymnastics	Men's vault	Takashi Ono, Boris Shakhlin	Japan, Soviet Union		
Shooting	50 metre rifle prone	Peter Kohnke	United Team of Germany		
Weightlifting	Men's heavyweight	Yury Vlasov	Soviet Union		

=== Day 18: Sun 11 September ===
Gold medalists
Sport	Event	Competitor(s)	NOC	Rec	Ref
Equestrian	Team jumping	Hans Günter Winkler, Fritz Thiedemann, Alwin Schockemöhle	United Team of Germany		
