= Italy national cycling team =

The Italy national cycling team represents Italy in International cycling competitions such as Olympic Games or World cycling Championships.

== History ==
The national Italian cyclingteam participated to all the Summer Olympics editions, from Paris 1900, 24 times on 26.

== Medal tables ==
Event	Editions	1st edition	Men				Women				Total				Ranking
Event	Editions	1st edition	Gold medal	Silver medal	Bronze medal	Tot.	Gold medal	Silver medal	Bronze medal	Tot.	Gold medal	Silver medal	Bronze medal	Tot.	Ranking
Olympic Games	24	1900	28	15	8	51	4	1	1	6	32	16	9	57	2nd
Road World Championships	79	1927									39	38	35	112	1st
Track World Championships	108	1893									75	82	89	246	4th

== Olympic Games ==
In pink color the women's medals.

Edition	Gold	Silver	Bronze	Total	Events
(Greece) Athens 1896				DNP	6
(France) Paris 1900				0	2
(United States) St. Louis 1904				DNP	7
(United Kingdom) London 1908				0	6
(Sweden) Stockholm 1912				0	2
(Belgium) Antwerp 1920	Team pursuit Primo Magnani; Arnaldo Carli; Ruggero Ferrario; Franco Giorgetti			1	6
(France) Paris 1924	Team pursuit Francesco Zucchetti; Angelo De Martini; Alfredo Dinale; Aurelio Menegazzi			1	6
(Netherlands) Amsterdam 1928	Team pursuit Cesare Facciani; Giacomo Gaioni; Mario Lusiani; Luigi Tasselli			1	6
(United States) Los Angeles 1932	Individual road race Attilio Pavesi	Individual road race Guglielmo Segato		5	6
(United States) Los Angeles 1932	Team road race Giuseppe Olmo; Attilio Pavesi; Guglielmo Segato			5	6
(United States) Los Angeles 1932			Sprint; Bruno Pellizzari	5	6
(United States) Los Angeles 1932	Team pursuit Paolo Pedretti; Nino Borsari; Marco Cimatti; Alberto Ghilardi			5	6
(Nazi Germany) Berlin 1936		Team pursuit Severino Rigoni; Bianco Bianchi; Mario Gentili; Armando Latini		1	6
(United Kingdom) London 1948	Sprint; Mario Ghella			3	6
(United Kingdom) London 1948	Tandem; Renato Perona; Ferdinando Teruzzi			3	6
(United Kingdom) London 1948		Team pursuit Rino Pucci; Arnaldo Benfenati; Guido Bernardi; Anselmo Citterio		3	6
(Finland) Helsinki 1952		Team road race Dino Bruni; Gianni Ghidini; Vincenzo Zucconelli		5	6
(Finland) Helsinki 1952		1000m time trial Marino Morettini		5	6
(Finland) Helsinki 1952	Sprint; Enzo Sacchi			5	6
(Finland) Helsinki 1952			Tandem; Antonio Maspes; Cesare Pinarello	5	6
(Finland) Helsinki 1952	Team pursuit Marino Morettini; Loris Campana; Mino De Rossi; Guido Messina			5	6
(Australia) Melbourne 1956	Individual road race Ercole Baldini			5	6
(Australia) Melbourne 1956	1000m time trial Leandro Faggin			5	6
(Australia) Melbourne 1956		Sprint; Guglielmo Pesenti		5	6
(Australia) Melbourne 1956			Tandem; Giuseppe Ogna; Cesare Pinarello	5	6
(Australia) Melbourne 1956	Team pursuit Valentino Gasparella; Antonio Domenicali; Leandro Faggin; Franco Gandini			5	6
(Italy) Rome 1960		Individual road race Livio Trapè		7	6
(Italy) Rome 1960	Team time trial Livio Trapè; Antonio Bailetti; Ottavio Cogliati; Giacomo Fornoni			7	6
(Italy) Rome 1960	1000m time trial Sante Gaiardoni			7	6
(Italy) Rome 1960	Sprint; Sante Gaiardoni		Sprint; Valentino Gasparella	7	6
(Italy) Rome 1960	Tandem; Giuseppe Beghetto; Sergio Bianchetto			7	6
(Italy) Rome 1960	Team pursuit Marino Vigna; Luigi Arienti; Franco Testa; Mario Vallotto			7	6
(Japan) Tokyo 1964	Individual road race Mario Zanin			8	7
(Japan) Tokyo 1964		Team time trial Ferruccio Manza; Severino Andreoli; Luciano Dalla Bona; Pietro Guerra		8	7
(Japan) Tokyo 1964		1000m time trial Giovanni Pettenella		8	7
(Japan) Tokyo 1964	Sprint; Giovanni Pettenella	Sprint; Sergio Bianchetto		8	7
(Japan) Tokyo 1964	Tandem; Sergio Bianchetto; Angelo Damiano			8	7
(Japan) Tokyo 1964		Individual pursuit Giorgio Ursi		8	7
(Japan) Tokyo 1964		Team pursuit Franco Testa; Cencio Mantovani; Carlo Rancati; Luigi Roncaglia		8	7
Mexico City 1968	Individual road race Pierfranco Vianelli			4	7
Mexico City 1968			Team time trial Pierfranco Vianelli; Giovanni Bramucci; Vittorio Marcelli; Mauro Simonetti	4	7
Mexico City 1968		Sprint; Giordano Turrini		4	7
Mexico City 1968			Team pursuit Luigi Roncaglia; Lorenzo Bosisio; Cipriano Chemello; Giorgio Morbiato	4	7
(West Germany) Munich 1972				0	7
(Canada) Montreal 1976		Individual road race Giuseppe Martinelli		1	6
(Soviet Union) Moscow 1980				0	6
(United States) Los Angeles 1984	Team time trial Marcello Bartalini; Marco Giovannetti; Eros Poli; Claudio Vandelli			1	8
(South Korea) Seul 1988				0	9
(Spain) Barcelona 1992	Individual road race Fabio Casartelli			3	10
(Spain) Barcelona 1992		Team time trial Andrea Peron; Flavio Anastasia; Luca Colombo; Gianfranco Contri		3	10
(Spain) Barcelona 1992	Points race Giovanni Lombardi			3	10
(United States) Atlanta 1996		Individual road race Imelda Chiappa		5	14
(United States) Atlanta 1996	Individual pursuit Andrea Collinelli			5	14
(United States) Atlanta 1996	Points race Silvio Martinello			5	14
(United States) Atlanta 1996	Individual pursuit Antonella Bellutti			5	14
(United States) Atlanta 1996	Mountain bike Paola Pezzo			5	14
(Australia) Sydney 2000			Madison; Silvio Martinello; Marco Villa	3	18
(Australia) Sydney 2000	Points race Antonella Bellutti			3	18
(Australia) Sydney 2000	Mountain bike Paola Pezzo			3	18
(Greece) Athens 2004	Individual road race Paolo Bettini			1	18
(China) Beijing 2008			Women's road race Tatiana Guderzo	1	18
(United Kingdom) London 2012			Mountain bike Marco Fontana	1	18
	32	16	9	57	

== Multiple medalists ==
=== Olympic Games ===
#	Fencer	Individual			Team			Total		
#	Fencer	Gold medal	Silver medal	Bronze medal	Gold medal	Silver medal	Bronze medal	Gold medal	Silver medal	Bronze medal
1	Sergio Bianchetto	0	1	0	2	0	0	2	1	0
2	Sante Gaiardoni	2	0	0	0	0	0	2	0	0
2	Antonella Bellutti	2	0	0	0	0	0	2	0	0
2	Paola Pezzo	2	0	0	0	0	0	2	0	0
5	Attilio Pavesi	1	0	0	1	0	0	2	0	0
5	Leandro Faggin	1	0	0	1	0	0	2	0	0

== See also ==
- Italy at the Olympics
- Cycling Summer Olympics medal table
