= United Team of Germany at the 1960 Summer Olympics =

- Flag of Germany superimposed with the Olympic rings
- IOC code: EUA
- NOC: United Team of Germany

in Rome, Italy 25 August-11 September
- Competitors: 293 (238 men, 55 women) in 17 sports
- Flag bearer: Fritz Thiedemann (equestrian)
- Medals Ranked 4th: Gold 12 Silver 19 Bronze 11 Total 42

Summer Olympics appearances (overview)
- 1956; 1960; 1964

Other related appearances
- Germany (1896–1936, 1952, 1992–pres.); Saar (1952); East Germany (1968–1988); West Germany (1968–1988)

Athletes from East Germany (German Democratic Republic; GDR) and West Germany (Federal Republic of Germany; FRG) competed together as the United Team of Germany at the 1960 Summer Olympics in Rome, Italy. 293 competitors, 238 men and 55 women, took part in 148 events in 17 sports.

== Medalists ==
Nationality in brackets.

=== Gold ===
- Armin Hary (West Germany) — Athletics, Men's 100 metres
- Bernd Cullmann, Armin Hary, Walter Mahlendorf, Martin Lauer (all from West Germany) — Athletics, Men's 4 × 100 m Relay
- Dieter Krause (East Germany), Günter Perleberg (East Germany), Paul Lange (West Germany), Friedhelm Wentzke (West Germany) — Canoeing, Men's K1 4 × 500 m
- Ingrid Krämer (East Germany) — Diving, Women's 3 m Springboard
- Ingrid Krämer (East Germany) — Diving, Women's 10 m Platform
- Hans Günter Winkler, Fritz Thiedemann, Alwin Schockemöhle (all from West Germany) — Equestrian, Jumping Team
- Heidi Schmid (West Germany) — Fencing, Women's Foil
- Bernhard Knubel, Heinz Renneberg, Klaus Zerta (all from West Germany) — Rowing, Men's Coxed Pairs
- Gerd Cintl, Horst Effertz, Klaus Riekemann, Jürgen Litz, Michael Obst (all from West Germany) — Rowing, Men's Coxed Fours
- Manfred Rulffs, Walter Schröder, Frank Schepke, Kraft Schepke, Karl-Heinrich von Groddeck, Karl-Heinz Hopp, Klaus Bittner, Hans Lenk, Willi Padge (all from West Germany) — Rowing, Men's Eight
- Peter Kohnke (West Germany) — Shooting, Men's 50 m Rifle Prone
- Wilfried Dietrich (West Germany) — Wrestling, Men's Freestyle Heavyweight

=== Silver ===
- Carl Kaufmann (West Germany) — Athletics, Men's 400 metres
- Hans Grodotzki (East Germany) — Athletics, Men's 5000 metres
- Hans Grodotzki (East Germany) — Athletics, Men's 10.000 metres
- Manfred Kinder, Joachim Reske, Johannes Kaiser, Carl Kaufmann (all from West Germany) — Athletics, Men's 4 × 400 m Relay
- Jutta Heine (West Germany) — Athletics, Women's 200 metres
- Martha Langbein, Anni Biechl, Brunhilde Hendrix, Jutta Heine (all from West Germany) — Athletics, Women's 4 × 100 m Relay
- Walter Krüger (East Germany) — Athletics, Men's Javelin Throw
- Johanna Lüttge (East Germany) — Athletics, Women's Shot Put
- Therese Zenz (West Germany) — Canoeing, Women's K1 500 m Kayak Singles
- Therese Zenz, Ingrid Hartmann (both from West Germany) — Canoeing, Women's K2 500 m Kayak Pairs
- Gustav-Adolf Schur, Egon Adler, Erich Hagen, Günter Lörke (all from East Germany) — Cycling, Men's Team Time Trial
- Siegried Köhler, Bernd Barleben, Peter Gröning, Manfred Klieme (all from East Germany) — Cycling, Men's Team Pursuit
- Jürgen Simon, Lothar Stäber (both from East Germany) — Cycling, Men's Tandem
- Dieter Gieseler (West Germany) — Cycling, Men's 1000 m Time Trial
- Achim Hill (East Germany) — Rowing, Men's Single Sculls
- Wiltrud Urselmann (West Germany) — Swimming, Women's 200 m Breaststroke
- Lothar Metz (East Germany) — Wrestling, Men's Greco-Roman Middleweight
- Günther Maritschnigg (West Germany) — Wrestling, Men's Greco-Roman Welterweight
- Wilfried Dietrich (West Germany) — Wrestling, Men's Greco-Roman Heavyweight

=== Bronze ===
- Ursula Donath (East Germany) — Athletics, Women's 800 metres
- Gisela Birkemeyer (East Germany) — Athletics, Women's 80 m Hurdles
- Hildrun Claus (East Germany) — Athletics, Women's Long Jump
- Günter Siegmund (East Germany) — Boxing, Men's Heavyweight
- Josef Neckermann (West Germany) — Equestrian, Dressage Individual
- Jürgen Theuerkauff, Tim Gerresheim, Eberhard Mehl, Jürgen Brecht (all from West Germany) — Fencing, Men's Team Foil
- Rolf Mulka, Ingo von Bredow (both from West Germany) — Sailing, Flying Dutchman
- Klaus Zähringer (West Germany) — Shooting, Men's 50 m Rifle Three Positions
- Barbara Göbel (East Germany) — Swimming, Women's 200 m Breaststroke
- Christel Steffin (East Germany), Heidi Pechstein (East Germany), Gisela Weiß (East Germany), Ursel Brunner (West Germany) — Swimming, Women's 4 × 100 m Freestyle Relay
- Ingrid Schmidt (East Germany), Ursula Küper (East Germany), Bärbel Fuhrmann (East Germany), Ursel Brunner (West Germany) — Swimming, Women's 4 × 100 m Medley Relay

== Boxing ==
Men's Flyweight

- Manfred Homberg =5th

Men's Bantamweight

- Horst Rascher (Note: also competed for West Germany at the 1968 Summer Olympics) =5th

Men's Featherweight

- Werner Kirsch =9th

Men's Lightweight

- Harry Lempio =9th

Men's Light welterweight

- Werner Busse =17th

Men's Welterweight

- Bruno Guse (Note: also competed at the 1964 Summer Olympics) =17th

Light-Middleweight

- Rolf Caroli =17th

Men's Middleweight

- Eberhard Radzik =17th

Men's Light heavyweight

- Emil Willer =9th

Men's Heavyweight

- Günter Siegmund Bronze

== Cycling ==
14 male cyclists represented Germany in 1960.

Individual road race

- Egon Adler
- Erich Hagen
- Bernhard Eckstein
- Gustav-Adolf Schur

Team time trial

- Gustav-Adolf Schur
- Egon Adler
- Erich Hagen
- Günter Lörke

Sprint

- August Rieke
- Günter Kaslowski

1000 m time trial

- Dieter Gieseler

Tandem

- Jürgen Simon
- Lothar Stäber

Team pursuit

- Siegfried Köhler
- Peter Gröning
- Manfred Klieme
- Bernd Barleben

== Diving ==
Men

Athlete	Event	Preliminary		Semi-final				Final			
Athlete	Event	Points	Rank	Points	Rank	Total	Rank	Points	Rank	Total	Rank
Rudi Oertel	3 m springboard	51.80	15 Q	40.10	7	91.90	11	Did not advance			
Hans-Dieter Pophal	3 m springboard	55.10	4 Q	38.81	=11	94.91	5 Q	39.04	8	133.95	8
Fritz Enskat	10 m platform	51.23	13 Q	41.80	6	93.07	7 Q	45.83	6	133.86	7
Rolf Sperling	10 m platform	57.25	2 Q	38.59	8	96.83	4 Q	55.00	5	151.83	5

Women

Athlete	Event	Preliminary		Semi-final				Final			
Athlete	Event	Points	Rank	Points	Rank	Total	Rank	Points	Rank	Total	Rank
Ingrid Krämer	3 m springboard	56.23	1 Q	42.37	1	96.80	1 Q	57.21	1	155.81	1st place, gold medalist(s)
Waldtraut Oertel	3 m springboard	48.64	11 Q	35.85	13	84.49	10	Did not advance			
Ingrid Krämer	10 m platform	56.30	1 Q	—N/a				34.98	2	91.28	1st place, gold medalist(s)
Gabriele Schöpe	10 m platform	48.81	15	—N/a				Did not advance			

== Fencing ==
19 fencers, 13 men and 6 women, represented Germany in 1960.

Men's foil

- Eberhard Mehl
- Tim Gerresheim
- Jürgen Brecht

Men's team foil

- Jürgen Brecht, Tim Gerresheim, Eberhard Mehl, Jürgen Theuerkauff

Men's épée

- Paul Gnaier
- Georg Neuber
- Dieter Fänger

Men's team épée

- Paul Gnaier, Fritz Zimmermann, Dieter Fänger, Georg Neuber, Helmut Anschütz, Walter Köstner

Men's sabre

- Jürgen Theuerkauff
- Walter Köstner
- Wilfried Wöhler

Men's team sabre

- Dieter Löhr, Jürgen Theuerkauff, Wilfried Wöhler, Peter von Krockow, Walter Köstner

Women's foil

- Heidi Schmid
- Helga Mees
- Rosemarie Weiß-Scherberger

Women's team foil

- Heidi Schmid, Helga Mees, Helga Stroh, Helmi Höhle, Gudrun Theuerkauff, Rosemarie Weiß-Scherberger

== Field hockey ==
Fourteen male field hockey players competed in 1960, when the German team finished in 7th place.

- Carsten Keller
- Christian Büchting
- Dieter Krause
- Eberhard Ferstl
- Günther Ullerich
- Helmut Nonn
- Herbert Winters
- Hugo Budinger
- Klaus Greinert
- Klaus Woeller
- Norbert Schuler
- Werner Delmes
- Willi Brendel
- Wolfgang End

== Modern pentathlon ==
Three male pentathletes represented Germany in 1960.

Individual

- Wolfgang Gödicke
- Dieter Krickow
- Ralf Berckhan

Team

- Wolfgang Gödicke
- Dieter Krickow
- Ralf Berckhan

== Rowing ==
The United Team of Germany had 26 male rowers participate in all seven rowing events in 1960.

Men's single sculls – 2nd place ( silver medal)

- Achim Hill

Men's double sculls

- Heinz Becher
- Günter Schroers

Men's coxless pair – 4th place

- Jochen Neuling
- Heinz Weigel

Men's coxed pair – 1st place ( gold medal)

- Bernhard Knubel
- Heinz Renneberg
- Klaus Zerta

Men's coxless four

- Victor Hendrix
- Manfred Kluth
- Georg Niermann
- Albrecht Wehselau

Men's coxed four – 1st place ( gold medal)

- Gerd Cintl
- Horst Effertz
- Klaus Riekemann
- Jürgen Litz
- Michael Obst

Men's eight – 1st place ( gold medal)

- Manfred Rulffs
- Walter Schröder
- Frank Schepke
- Kraft Schepke
- Karl-Heinrich von Groddeck
- Karl-Heinz Hopp
- Klaus Bittner
- Hans Lenk
- Willi Padge

== Shooting ==
Ten shooters represented Germany in 1960. Peter Kohnke won gold in the 50 m rifle, prone and Klaus Zähringer won bronze in the 50 m rifle, three positions.

25 m pistol

- Heinz Franke
- Heinrich Gollwitzer

50 m pistol

- Horst Kadner
- Wolfgang Losack

300 m rifle, three positions

- Hans-Joachim Mars

50 m rifle, three positions

- Klaus Zähringer
- Bernd Klingner

50 m rifle, prone

- Peter Kohnke
- Bernd Klingner

Trap

- Gerhard Aßmus
- Heinz Kramer

== Swimming ==
Men

Athlete	Event	Heat		Swim-off		Semifinal		Final	
Athlete	Event	Time	Rank	Time	Rank	Time	Rank	Time	Rank
Uwe Jacobsen	100 m freestyle	57.9	=19 Q	—N/a		57.4	13	Did not advance	
Paul Voell	100 m freestyle	58.0	22 Q	—N/a		58.4	=20	Did not advance	
Gerhard Hetz	400 m freestyle	4:38.4	18	—N/a				Did not advance	
Hans-Joachim Klein	400 m freestyle	4:31.6	10	—N/a				Did not advance	
Gerhard Hetz	1500 m freestyle	18:32.2	15	—N/a				Did not advance	
Hans-Ulrich Millow	1500 m freestyle	18:22.7	12	—N/a				Did not advance	
Jürgen Dietze	100 m backstroke	1:04.0	=5 Q	—N/a		1:04.7	=9	Did not advance	
Wolfgang Wagner	100 m backstroke	1:04.7	=10 Q	—N/a		1:03.9	6 Q	1:03.5	6
Konrad Enke	200 m breaststroke	2:44.6	21	—N/a		Did not advance			
Egon Henninger	200 m breaststroke	2:42.4	=15 QSO	2:39.5	1 Q	2:38.5	3 Q	2:40.1	4
Jürgen Bachmann	200 m butterfly	2:25.0	=16 QSO	2:23.1	1 Q	2:28.4	14	Did not advance	
Wolfgang Sieber	200 m butterfly	2:25.4	19	—N/a		Did not advance			
Frank Wiegand; Gerhard Hetz; Hans Zierold; Hans-Joachim Klein	4 × 200 m freestyle	8:29.4	5 Q	—N/a				8:31.8	7
Wolfgang Wagner; Günter Tittes; Hermann Lotter; Uwe Jacobsen	4 × 100 m medley	4:17.7	=9	—N/a				Did not advance	

Women

Athlete	Event	Heat		Semifinal		Final	
Athlete	Event	Time	Rank	Time	Rank	Time	Rank
Ursel Brunner	100 m freestyle	1:04.6	10 Q	1:04.5	10	Did not advance	
Heidi Pechstein	100 m freestyle	1:05.1	11 Q	1:05.6	=13	Did not advance	
Ursel Brunner	400 m freestyle	5:05.3	11	—N/a		Did not advance	
Gisela Weiß	400 m freestyle	5:08.6	12	—N/a		Did not advance	
Helga Schmidt	100 m backstroke	1:13.3	12	—N/a		Did not advance	
Ingrid Schmidt	100 m backstroke	1:13.1	11	—N/a		Did not advance	
Barbara Göbel	200 m breaststroke	2:54.2	4 Q	—N/a		2:53.6	3rd place, bronze medalist(s)
Wiltrud Urselmann	200 m breaststroke	2:52.0 OR	1 Q	—N/a		2:50.0	2nd place, silver medalist(s)
Heidi Eisenschmidt	100 m butterfly	1:14.6	13	—N/a		Did not advance	
Bärbel Fuhrmann	100 m butterfly	1:13.2	=9	—N/a		Did not advance	
Christel Steffin; Heidi Pechstein; Gisela Weiß; Ursel Brunner	4 × 100 m freestyle	4:24.2	4 Q	—N/a		4:19.7	3rd place, bronze medalist(s)
Ingrid Schmidt; Ursula Küper; Bärbel Fuhrmann; Ursel Brunner	4 × 100 m medley	4:49.6	4 Q	—N/a		4:47.6	3rd place, bronze medalist(s)
