= Czechoslovakia at the 1960 Summer Olympics =

- IOC code: TCH (CSV used at these Games)
- NOC: Czechoslovak Olympic Committee

in Rome
- Competitors: 116 (99 men, 17 women) in 13 sports
- Flag bearer: Jiří Kormaník (wrestling)
- Medals Ranked 10th: Gold 3 Silver 2 Bronze 3 Total 8

Summer Olympics appearances (overview)
- 1920; 1924; 1928; 1932; 1936; 1948; 1952; 1956; 1960; 1964; 1968; 1972; 1976; 1980; 1984; 1988; 1992

Other related appearances
- Bohemia (1900–1912); Czech Republic (1994–pres.); Slovakia (1994–pres.)

Czechoslovakia competed at the 1960 Summer Olympics in Rome, Italy. 116 competitors, 99 men and 17 women, took part in 75 events in 13 sports.

== Medalists ==
Medal	Name	Sport	Event
Gold	Bohumil Němeček	Boxing	Men's light welterweight
Gold	Václav Kozák; Pavel Schmidt	Rowing	Men's double sculls
Gold	Eva Bosáková	Gymnastics	Women's balance beam
Silver	Dana Zátopková	Athletics	Women's javelin throw
Silver	Eva Bosáková; Věra Čáslavská; Matylda Matoušková-Šínová; Hana Růžičková; Ludmila Švédová; Adolfína Tkačíková	Gymnastics	Women's team all-around
Bronze	Josef Němec	Boxing	Men's heavyweight
Bronze	Bohumil Janoušek; Jan Jindra; Jiří Lundák; Stanislav Lusk; Václav Pavkovič; Luděk Pojezný; Jan Švéda; Josef Věntus; Miroslav Koníček	Rowing	Men's eight
Bronze	Bohumil Kubát	Wrestling	Men's Greco-Roman heavyweight

== Cycling ==
Six male cyclist represented Czechoslovakia in 1960.

Tandem

- Juraj Miklušica
- Dušan Škvarenina

Team pursuit

- Slavoj Černý
- Ferdinand Duchoň
- Jan Chlístovský
- Josef Volf

== Diving ==
Men

Athlete	Event	Preliminary		Semi-final				Final			
Athlete	Event	Points	Rank	Points	Rank	Total	Rank	Points	Rank	Total	Rank
Tomáš Bauer	3 m springboard	49.92	21	Did not advance							
Tomáš Bauer	10 m platform	46.06	21	Did not advance							

== Rowing ==
Czechoslovakia had 22 male rowers participate in five of the seven rowing events in 1960.

Men's double sculls – 1st place ( gold medal)

- Václav Kozák
- Pavel Schmidt

Men's coxed pair

- Václav Chalupa
- Miroslav Strejček
- František Staněk

Men's coxless four – 4th place

- Jindřich Blažek
- Miroslav Jíška
- René Líbal
- Jaroslav Starosta

Men's coxed four

- Pavel Hofmann
- Richard Nový
- Petr Pulkrábek
- Oldřich Tikal
- Miroslav Koníček

Men's eight – 3rd place ( bronze medal)

- Bohumil Janoušek
- Jan Jindra
- Jiří Lundák
- Stanislav Lusk
- Václav Pavkovič
- Luděk Pojezný
- Jan Švéda
- Josef Věntus
- Miroslav Koníček

== Shooting ==
Nine shooters represented Czechoslovakia in 1960.

25 m pistol

- Jiří Hrneček
- Josef Šváb

50 m pistol

- Vladimír Kudrna
- Jiří Hrneček

300 m rifle, three positions

- Vladimír Stibořík
- František Prokop

50 m rifle, three positions

- Dušan Houdek
- Otakar Hořínek

50 m rifle, prone

- Otakar Hořínek
- Dušan Houdek

Trap

- Josef Hrach
- Václav Zavázal

== Swimming ==
Men

Athlete	Event	Heat		Swim-off		Semifinal		Final	
Athlete	Event	Time	Rank	Time	Rank	Time	Rank	Time	Rank
Vítězslav Svozil	200 m breaststroke	2:42.4	=15 QSO	2:41.7	3	Did not advance			
Pavel Pazdírek	200 m butterfly	2:24.2	12 Q	—N/a		2:23.5	9	Did not advance	

Women

Athlete	Event	Heat		Final	
Athlete	Event	Time	Rank	Time	Rank
Marta Kadlecová	200 m breaststroke	3:01.7	18	Did not advance	
