= Brotto =

Brotto is an Italian surname. Notable people with the surname include:

- Juan Brotto (1939–2009), Argentine cyclist
- Lori Brotto (born 1975), Canadian psychologist
