= Cycling at the 1960 Summer Olympics – Men's team pursuit =

Men's cycling team pursuit at the Games of the XVII Olympiad
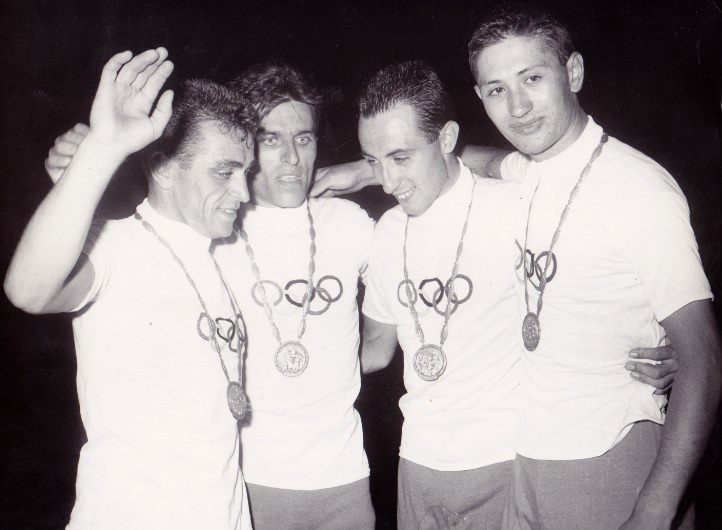
- Luigi Arienti, Mario Vallotto, Franco Testa and Marino Vigna
- Venue: Olympic Velodrome, Rome
- Date: 27–29 August 1960
- Competitors: 76 from 19 nations

Medalists
1st place, gold medalist(s)		Luigi Arienti, Franco Testa, Mario Vallotto, Marino Vigna	Italy
2nd place, silver medalist(s)		Siegfried Köhler, Peter Gröning, Manfred Klieme, Bernd Barleben	United Team of Germany
3rd place, bronze medalist(s)		Stanislav Moskvin, Viktor Romanov, Leonid Kolumbet, Arnold Belgardt	Soviet Union

The men's team pursuit at the 1960 Summer Olympics in Rome, Italy, was held from 27 to 29 August 1960. There were 76 participants from 19 nations.

== Competition format ==
The team pursuit event consisted of both a time trial (with up to 2 teams on the track at the same time) and a series of head-to-head races between 2 teams. There were a total of four rounds: an elimination round, quarterfinals, semifinals, and finals.

- Elimination round: This round was a time trial, with 1 or 2 teams on the track simultaneously. The top 8 times, regardless of heat, advanced to the head-to-head competitions.
- Quarterfinals: There were four quarterfinals. Beginning with the quarterfinals, each round featured a single head-to-head race. The winner of each advanced to the semifinals while the loser was eliminated.
- Semifinals: There two semifinals. The winner of each advanced to the gold medal final, the loser to the bronze medal final.
- Finals: A gold medal final and a bronze medal final were held.

== Results ==
=== Elimination round ===
Rank	Heat	Nation	Time	Notes
1	7	Italy	4:38.41	Q
2	6	France	4:38.46	Q
3	7	United Team of Germany	4:40.33	Q
4	3	Soviet Union	4:40.48	Q
5	4	Netherlands	4:40.64	Q
6	5	Denmark	4:40.80	Q
7	2	Czechoslovakia	4:42.60	Q
8	1	Argentina	4:44.44	Q
9	11	Spain	4:44.87	
10	5	Great Britain	4:45.23	
11	1	Japan	4:45.87	
12	8	Austria	4:47.70	
13	10	Uruguay	4:47.83	
14	2	Australia	4:48.55	
15	10	Belgium	4:49.46	
16	9	United States	4:49.92	
17	6	Switzerland	4:50.00	
18	4	South Africa	4:50.26	
19	8	Mexico	4:52.55	

=== Quarterfinals ===
==== Quarterfinal 1 ====
Rank	Nation	Time	Notes
1	Italy	4:29.98	Q
2	Argentina	4:38.17	

==== Quarterfinal 2 ====
Rank	Nation	Time	Notes
1	France	4:30.82	Q
2	Czechoslovakia	4:38.73	

==== Quarterfinal 3 ====
Rank	Nation	Time	Notes
1	United Team of Germany	4:29.32	Q
2	Denmark	4:37.44	

==== Quarterfinal 4 ====
Rank	Nation	Time	Notes
1	Soviet Union	4:29.97	Q
2	Netherlands	4:29.98	

=== Semifinals ===
==== Semifinal 1 ====
Rank	Nation	Time	Notes
1	United Team of Germany	4:33.46	Q
2	France	4:37.17	B

==== Semifinal 2 ====
Rank	Nation	Time	Notes
1	Italy	4:28.88	Q
2	Soviet Union	4:33.01	B

=== Finals ===
==== Bronze medal final ====
Rank	Nation	Time
3rd place, bronze medalist(s)	Soviet Union	4:34.05
4	France	4:35.72

==== Gold medal final ====
Rank	Nation	Time
1st place, gold medalist(s)	Italy	4:30.90
2nd place, silver medalist(s)	United Team of Germany	4:35.78

== Final classification ==
Rank	Cyclists	Nation
1st place, gold medalist(s)	Luigi Arienti; Franco Testa; Mario Vallotto; Marino Vigna	Italy
2nd place, silver medalist(s)	Siegfried Köhler; Peter Gröning; Manfred Klieme; Bernd Barleben	United Team of Germany
3rd place, bronze medalist(s)	Stanislav Moskvin; Viktor Romanov; Leonid Kolumbet; Arnold Belgardt	Soviet Union
4	Marcel Delattre; Jacques Suire; Guy Claud; Michel Nédélec	France
5	Alberto Trillo; Ernesto Contreras; Héctor Acosta; Juan Brotto	Argentina
5	Slavoj Černý; Ferdinand Duchoň; Jan Chlístovský; Josef Volf	Czechoslovakia
5	John Lundgren; Leif Larsen; Jens Sørensen; Kurt vid Stein	Denmark
5	Jaap Oudkerk; Theo Nikkessen; Henk Nijdam; Piet van der Lans	Netherlands
9	José María Errandonea; Francisco Tortellá; Miguel Martorell; Miguel Mora Gornals	Spain
10	Barry Hoban; Mike Gambrill; Charlie McCoy; Joseph McClean	Great Britain
11	Tetsuo Osawa; Kanji Kubomura; Nobuhira Takanuki; Katsuya Saito	Japan
12	Günther Kriz; Peter Deimböck; Kurt Garschal; Kurt Schein	Austria
13	Alberto Velázquez; Juan José Timón; Rubén Etchebarne; Rodolfo Rodino	Uruguay
14	Warren Scarfe; Garry Jones; Robert Whetters; Frank Brazier	Australia
15	Romain De Loof; Barthélemy Gillard; Frans Melckenbeeck; Charles Rabaey	Belgium
16	Richard Cortright; Charles Hewett; Robert Pfarr; James Rossi	United States
17	Walter Signer; Werner Weckert; Hans Heinemann; Egon Scheiwiller	Switzerland
18	Syd Byrnes; Bobby Fowler; Abe Jonker; Rowan Peacock	South Africa
19	Mauricio Mata; Javier Taboada; Jacinto Brito; Miguel Pérez	Mexico
