= Miguel Mora =

Miguel Mora may refer to:

- Miguel Mora (journalist) (born 1965), Nicaraguan journalist
- Miguel Mora Porras (1816–1887), Costa Rican interim president
- Miguel Mora Gornals (1936–2012), Spanish cyclist
- Miguel Mora (footballer) (born 1974), Spanish footballer
