= Nobuhira Takanuki =

Japanese cyclist

Personal information
- Born: 9 May 1938 (age 88) Kanagawa Prefecture, Japan
- Died: 1 December 1978 (aged 40)

Cycling career
- Sport: Cycling

Nobuhira Takanuki (born 9 May 1938) is a Japanese former cyclist. He competed in the team pursuit at the 1960 Summer Olympics.
