= Leif Larsen (cyclist) =

Danish cyclist

Personal information
- Born: 30 September 1942 (age 84) Odense, Denmark

Cycling career
- Sport: Cycling

Leif Larsen (born 30 September 1942) is a Danish former cyclist. He competed in the team pursuit at the 1960 Summer Olympics.
