= Werner Weckert =

Swiss cyclist

Personal information
- Born: 23 August 1938 Zürich, Switzerland
- Died: 14 December 2020 (aged 82)

Cycling career
- Sport: Cycling

Werner Weckert (23 August 1938 – 14 December 2020) was a Swiss cyclist. He competed in the team pursuit at the 1960 Summer Olympics.
