= Walter Signer (cyclist) =

Swiss cyclist

Personal information
- Born: 25 May 1937 (age 89) Zürich, Switzerland

Cycling career
- Sport: Cycling

Walter Signer (born 25 May 1937) is a former Swiss cyclist. He competed in the team pursuit at the 1960 Summer Olympics.
