= Kurt Garschal =

Austrian cyclist

Personal information
- Born: 11 August 1941 (age 85) Vienna, Nazi Germany

Cycling career
- Sport: Cycling

Kurt Garschal (born 11 August 1941) is an Austrian former cyclist. He competed in the team pursuit at the 1960 Summer Olympics.
