= Jens Sørensen (cyclist) =

Danish cyclist (1941–2020)

Personal information
- Born: 4 April 1941 Copenhagen, Denmark
- Died: 21 November 2020 (aged 79)

Cycling career
- Sport: Cycling

Jens Sørensen (4 April 1941 – 21 November 2020) was a Danish cyclist. He competed in the team pursuit at the 1960 Summer Olympics.

Sørensen's son, Rolf, was a professional cyclist who won multiple classics and a silver medal at the 1996 Summer Olympics.
