= Rowan Peacock =

South African cyclist (born 1939)

Personal information
- Born: 31 October 1939 (age 86) Wynberg, Cape Town, South Africa

Cycling career
- Sport: Cycling

Rowan Peacock (born 31 October 1939) is a South African former cyclist. He competed in the team pursuit at the 1960 Summer Olympics.
