= Katsuya Saito =

Japanese cyclist

Personal information
- Born: 3 March 1940 (age 86) Aichi Prefecture, Japan

Cycling career
- Sport: Cycling

Katsuya Saito (斎藤 勝也, Saitō Katsuya; born 3 March 1940) is a former Japanese cyclist. He competed in the team pursuit at the 1960 Summer Olympics.
