= Egon Scheiwiller =

Swiss cyclist

Personal information
- Born: 11 February 1937 Waldkirch, Switzerland
- Died: 4 September 2023 (aged 86)

Cycling career
- Sport: Cycling

Egon Scheiwiller (11 February 1937 – 4 September 2023) was a Swiss cyclist. He competed in the team pursuit at the 1960 Summer Olympics.
