= John Lundgren (cyclist) =

Danish cyclist (1940–2024)

Personal information
- Born: 30 July 1940 Aarhus, Denmark
- Died: 19 February 2024

Cycling career
- Sport: Cycling

John Lundgren (30 July 1940 – 19 February 2024) was a former Danish cyclist. He competed in the team pursuit at the 1960 Summer Olympics.

Lundgren died 19 February 2024, at the age of 83.
