= Kanji Kubomura =

Japanese cyclist

Personal information
- Born: 11 May 1943 (age 83) Gunma Prefecture, Japan

Cycling career
- Sport: Cycling

Kanji Kubomura (久保村 寛, Kubomura Kan; born 11 May 1943) is a former Japanese cyclist. He competed in the team pursuit at the 1960 Summer Olympics.
