= Javier Taboada =

Mexican cyclist

Personal information
- Born: 6 January 1935 (age 91) Mexico City, Mexico

Cycling career
- Sport: Cycling

Javier Taboada (born 6 January 1935) is a former Mexican cyclist. He competed in the team pursuit at the 1960 Summer Olympics.
