= 1960 Summer Olympics medal table =

1960 Summer Olympics medals
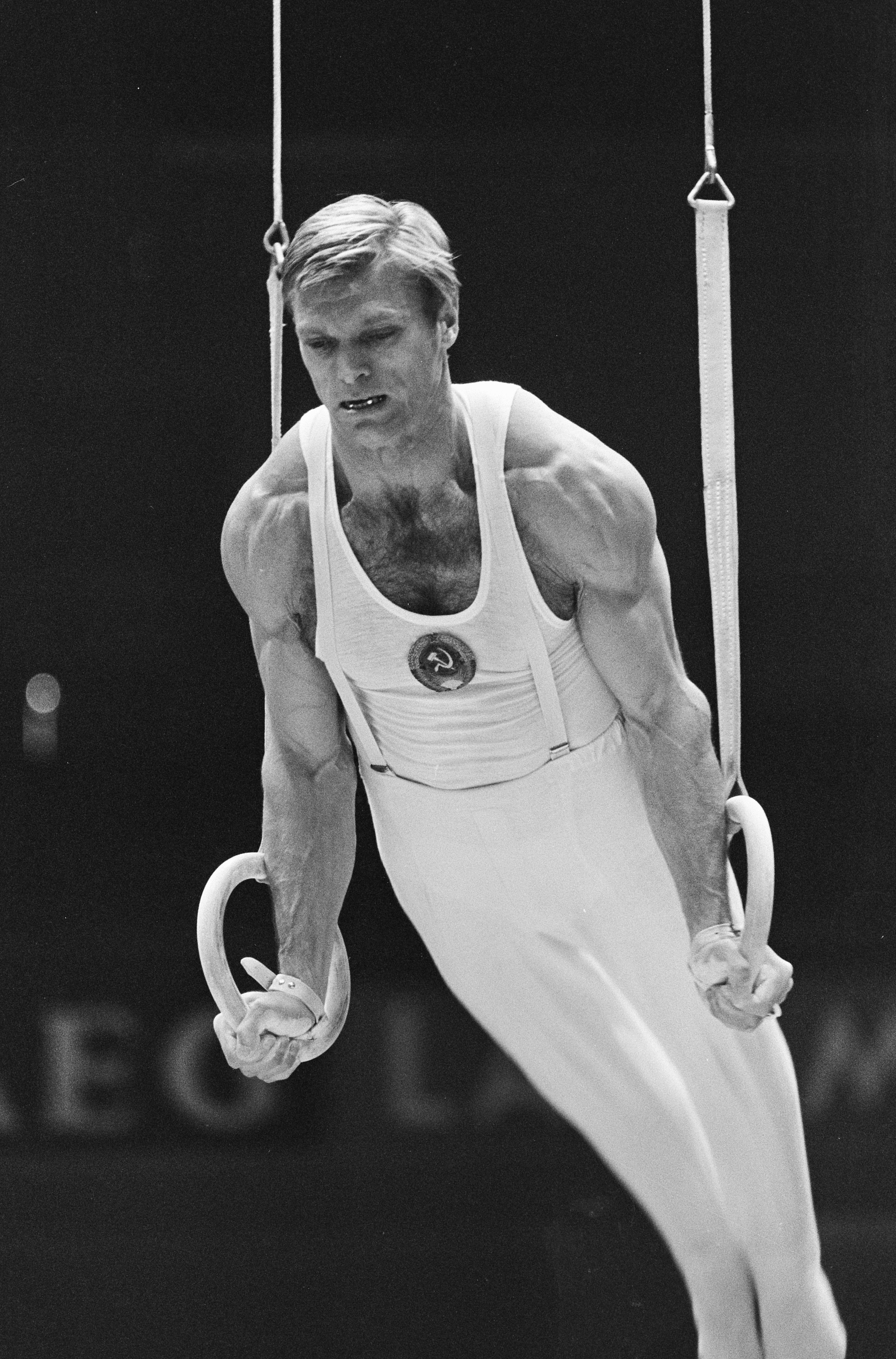
- Soviet gymnast Boris Shakhlin won four gold medals and seven total medals at the 1960 Summer Olympics, both of which were the most of any competing athlete.
- Location: Rome, Italy

Highlights
- Most gold medals: Soviet Union (43)
- Most total medals: Soviet Union (103)
- Medalling NOCs: 44

World map showing the medal achievements of each country during the 1960 Summer Olympics Legend: represents countries that won at least one gold medal. represents countries that won at least one silver medal but no gold medals. represents countries that won at least one bronze medal (no gold or silver). represents participating countries that did not win medals. represents entities that did not participate at the 1960 Summer Olympics.

The 1960 Summer Olympics, officially known as the Games of the XVII Olympiad, were an international multi-sport event held in Rome, Italy, from August 25 to September 11, 1960. A total of 5,338 athletes representing 83 National Olympic Committees (NOCs) participated, which included five teams making their Olympic debut at the Summer Games: the British West Indies, Morocco, San Marino, Sudan, and Tunisia. The games featured 150 events in 17 sports across 23 disciplines.

Athletes representing 44 NOCs received at least one medal, with 23 NOCs winning at least one gold medal. The Soviet Union won the most overall medals, with 103, and the most gold medals, with 43. The British West Indies, Republic of China (now competing as Chinese Taipei), Ethiopia, Ghana, Iraq, Morocco, and Singapore won their first Summer Olympic medals of any kind, with Ethiopia and Pakistan winning their first gold medals.

Among individual participants, Soviet gymnast Boris Shakhlin won the most gold medals, with four, and the most total medals, with seven (four gold, two silver, and one bronze). Italian fencer Edoardo Mangiarotti secured two medals at the 1960 games (one gold, one silver) and became the record holder for the most Olympic medals won, with 13 medals in total (six gold, five silver, two bronze). Mangiarotti had won medals at the 1936 (one gold), 1948 (two silver, one bronze), 1952 (two gold, two silver), and 1956 games (two gold, one bronze) prior to 1960.

== Medal table ==
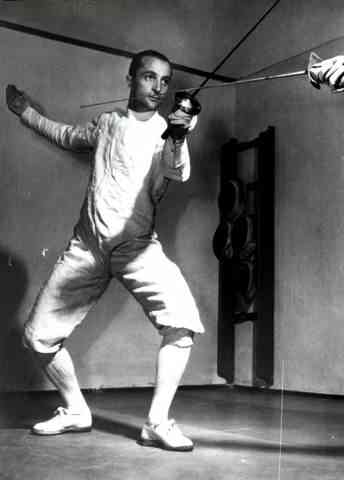
Italian fencer Edoardo Mangiarotti became the Olympian with the most total medals ever when he won his twelfth and thirteenth medals at the 1960 games. He had won 11 medals at Olympic Games prior to these games.

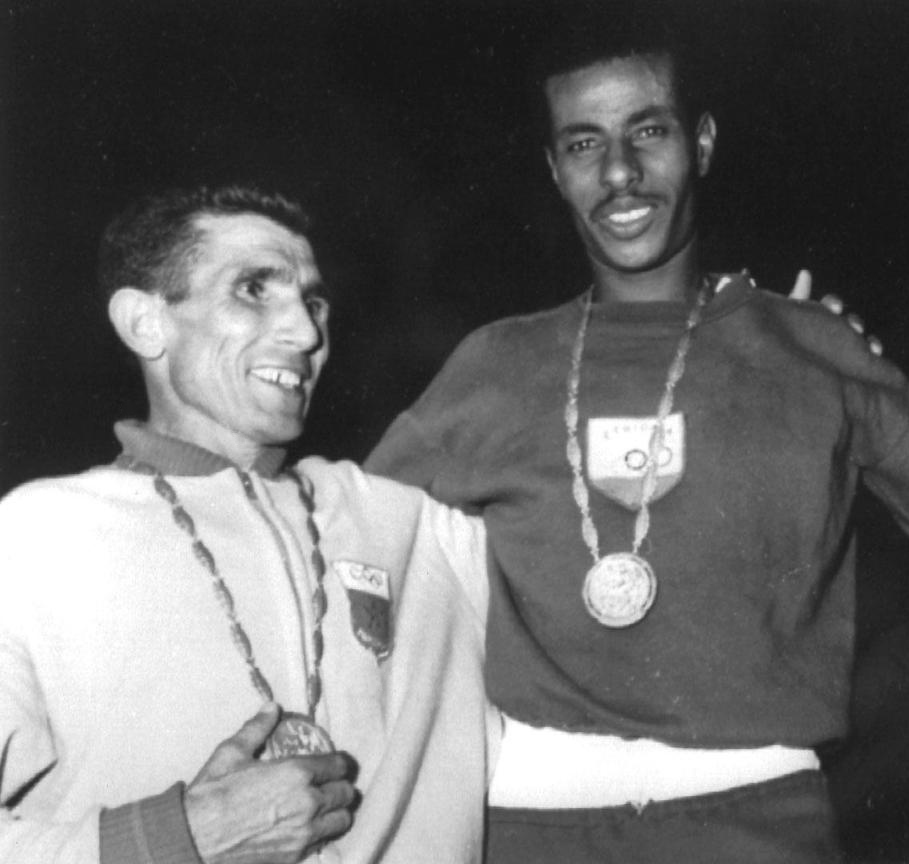
Ethiopian runner Abebe Bikila (right) and Moroccan runner Rhadi Ben Abdesselam won their countries' first Olympic medals in the men's marathon. Bikila finished first and Ben Abdesselam finished second.

The medal table is based on information provided by the International Olympic Committee (IOC) and is consistent with IOC conventional sorting in its published medal tables. The table uses the Olympic medal table sorting method. By default, the table is ordered by the number of gold medals the athletes from a nation have won, where a nation is an entity represented by a NOC. The number of silver medals is taken into consideration next and then the number of bronze medals. If teams are still tied, equal ranking is given and they are listed alphabetically by their IOC country code.

Events in boxing resulted in bronze medals being awarded to each of the competitors who lost their semi-final matches, as opposed to them taking part in a third place tiebreaker.

In women's high jump, a two-way tie for second resulted in two silvers and no bronze medals being awarded. In the men's pommel horse and men's vault, two-way ties for first resulted in two gold and no silver medals being awarded in each event. Lastly, in the men's ring event, there was a two-way tie for third which resulted in two bronze medals being awarded.

* Host nation (Italy)

1960 Summer Olympics medal table
Rank	NOC	Gold	Silver	Bronze	Total
1	Soviet Union	43	29	31	103
2	United States	34	21	16	71
3	Italy*	13	10	13	36
4	United Team of Germany	12	19	11	42
5	Australia	8	8	6	22
6	Turkey	7	2	0	9
7	Hungary	6	8	7	21
8	Japan	4	7	7	18
9	Poland	4	6	11	21
10	Czechoslovakia	3	2	3	8
11	Romania	3	1	6	10
12	Great Britain	2	6	12	20
13	Denmark	2	3	1	6
14	New Zealand	2	0	1	3
15	Bulgaria	1	3	3	7
16	Sweden	1	2	3	6
17	Finland	1	1	3	5
18	Austria	1	1	0	2
18	Yugoslavia	1	1	0	2
20	Pakistan	1	0	1	2
21	Ethiopia	1	0	0	1
21	Greece	1	0	0	1
21	Norway	1	0	0	1
24	Switzerland	0	3	3	6
25	France	0	2	3	5
26	Belgium	0	2	2	4
27	Iran	0	1	3	4
28	Netherlands	0	1	2	3
28	South Africa	0	1	2	3
30	Argentina	0	1	1	2
30	United Arab Republic	0	1	1	2
32	Canada	0	1	0	1
32	Formosa	0	1	0	1
32	Ghana	0	1	0	1
32	India	0	1	0	1
32	Morocco	0	1	0	1
32	Portugal	0	1	0	1
32	Singapore	0	1	0	1
39	Brazil	0	0	2	2
39	British West Indies	0	0	2	2
41	Iraq	0	0	1	1
41	Mexico	0	0	1	1
41	Spain	0	0	1	1
41	Venezuela	0	0	1	1
Totals (44 entries)		152	149	160	461

== See also ==
- All-time Olympic Games medal table
- List of 1960 Summer Olympics medal winners
- 1960 Winter Olympics medal table
- 1960 Summer Paralympics medal table
