= Miguel Pérez (cyclist) =

Mexican cyclist

Personal information
- Born: 22 January 1934 (age 92) Jalisco, Mexico

Cycling career
- Sport: Cycling

Miguel Pérez (born 22 January 1934) is a former Mexican cyclist. He competed in the team pursuit at the 1960 Summer Olympics.
