= Guy Claud =

French cyclist

Personal information
- Born: 25 April 1936 (age 90) Montrouge, France

Cycling career
- Sport: Cycling

Guy Claud (born 25 April 1936) is a French former cyclist. He competed in the team pursuit at the 1960 Summer Olympics.
