= Charles Hewett =

American cyclist (1929–2024)

Personal information
- Born: July 24, 1929 Boston, Massachusetts, U.S.
- Died: 26 July 2024 (aged 95) Westborough, Massachusetts, U.S.

Cycling career
- Sport: Cycling

Charles Hewett (July 24, 1929 – July 26, 2024) was an American cyclist. He competed in the team pursuit at the 1960 Summer Olympics. He served in the U.S. Air Force during the Korean War. Hewett died in Westborough, Massachusetts on July 26, 2024, at the age of 95.
