= Charles Rabaey =

Belgian cyclist (born 1934)

Personal information
- Born: 30 October 1934 Wingene, Belgium
- Died: 28 February 2026 (aged 91)

Cycling career
- Sport: Cycling

Charles Rabaey (30 October 1934 – 28 February 2026) was a Belgian cyclist. He competed in the team pursuit at the 1960 Summer Olympics.
