= Hans Heinemann =

Swiss cyclist

Personal information
- Born: 14 August 1940 Rapperswil, Switzerland
- Died: 31 July 2024 (aged 83)

Cycling career
- Sport: Cycling

Hans Heinemann (14 August 1940 – 31 July 2024) was a Swiss cyclist. He competed in the team pursuit at the 1960 Summer Olympics and the road race at the 1964 Summer Olympics.
