= Barthélemy Gillard =

Belgian cyclist

Personal information
- Born: 24 May 1935 (age 91) Liège, Belgium

Cycling career
- Sport: Cycling

Barthélemy Gillard (born 24 May 1935) is a Belgian former cyclist. He competed in the team pursuit at the 1960 Summer Olympics.
