= Marta Kadlecová =

Czech swimmer

Personal information
- Born: 20 July 1944 (age 80); Prague, Czechoslovakia
- Height: 1.62 m (5 ft 4 in)
- Weight: 58 kg (128 lb)

Marta Kadlecová (born 20 July 1944) is a retired swimmer from Czechoslovakia. She competed in the 200 m breaststroke at the 1960 Summer Olympics, but did not reach the final.

After marriage she changed her last name to Skupilová, same as that of another Olympic swimmer of her generation from Czechoslovakia, Marta Skupilová.
