= Ferdinand Duchoň =

Czech cyclist

Personal information
- Born: 13 February 1938 (age 88) Brno, Czechoslovakia

Cycling career
- Sport: Cycling

Ferdinand Duchoň (born 13 February 1938) is a former Czech cyclist. He competed in the team pursuit at the 1960 Summer Olympics.
