= Slavoj Černý =

Czech cyclist

Personal information
- Born: 4 March 1937 Bílina, Czechoslovakia
- Died: 31 December 2020 (aged 83)

Cycling career
- Sport: Cycling

Slavoj Černý (4 March 1937 – 31 December 2020) was a Czech cyclist. He competed in the team pursuit at the 1960 Summer Olympics.
