= Jacques Suire =

French cyclist (born 1943)

Personal information
- Born: 18 February 1943 (age 83) Talence, France

Cycling career
- Sport: Cycling

Jacques Suire (born 18 February 1943) is a former French cyclist. He competed at the 1960 Summer Olympics and the 1964 Summer Olympics.
