= Miguel Mora Gornals =

Spanish cyclist

Personal information
- Born: 11 September 1936 Ses Salines, Spain
- Died: 5 May 2012 (aged 75)

Cycling career
- Sport: Cycling

Miguel Mora Gornals (11 September 1936 – 5 May 2012) was a Spanish cyclist. He competed in the team pursuit at the 1960 Summer Olympics.
