= Juan Brotto =

Argentine cyclist (1939–2009)

Personal information
- Born: 27 November 1939 Padua, Italy
- Died: 29 January 2009 (aged 69)

Cycling career
- Sport: Cycling

Juan Brotto (27 November 1939 – 29 January 2009) was an Argentine cyclist. He competed in the team pursuit at the 1960 Summer Olympics.
