= Josef Volf =

Czech cyclist (1939–2025)

Personal information
- Born: 11 January 1939 Brno, Czechoslovakia
- Died: 18 September 2025 (aged 86)

Cycling career
- Sport: Cycling

Josef Volf, also Josef Wolf (11 January 1939 – 18 September 2025) was a Czech cyclist. Volf was born in Brno and his profession was an officer. His sporting career began with Dukla Brno. He competed in the team pursuit at the 1960 Summer Olympics. He died on 18 September 2025, at the age of 86.
