= Tomáš Bauer =

Czech diver

Personal information
- Nationality: Czech
- Born: 26 October 1932 (age 93) Prague, Czechoslovakia

Sport
- Sport: Diving

Tomáš Bauer (born 26 October 1932) is a Czech diver. He competed in two events at the 1960 Summer Olympics.
