= Vladimir Portnoy =

Soviet gymnast (1931–1984)

- Born: 9 June 1931 Odessa, Ukrainian SSR, Soviet Union
- Died: 19 February 1984 (aged 52)
- Height: 1.68 m (5 ft 6 in)

Gymnastics career
- Country represented: USSR
Medal record
Olympic Games
Silver medal – second place	1960 Rome	Team competition
Bronze medal – third place	1960 Rome	Long horse

Vladimir Vladimirovich Portnoy (Russian: Владимир Владимирович Портной; 9 June 1931 – 19 February 1984) was a Soviet gymnast. He was Jewish, and was born in Odessa.

Portnoy won a silver medal for the Soviet Union at the 1960 Olympics in Rome in team combined gymnastics. He won a bronze medal in the long horse at the same Olympics, behind Takashi Ono (gold) and Boris Shakhlin (silver).

== See also ==
- List of select Jewish gymnasts
