= Jan Chlístovský =

Czech cyclist

Personal information
- Born: 15 May 1934 (age 92) Prague, Czechoslovakia

Cycling career
- Sport: Cycling

Jan Chlístovský (born 15 May 1934) is a former Czech cyclist. He competed in the team pursuit at the 1960 Summer Olympics.
