= Viktor Romanov =

Personal information
- Born: 15 September 1937 (age 88) Leningrad, Russian SFSR, Soviet Union
- Height: 1.78 m (5 ft 10 in)
- Weight: 77 kg (170 lb)

Sport
- Sport: Cycling
- Club: Burevestnik Leningrad
Medal record
Representing the Soviet Union
Olympic Games
Bronze medal – third place	1960 Rome	Team pursuit
World Championships
Gold medal – first place	1963 Rocourt	Team pursuit
Bronze medal – third place	1962 Milan	Team pursuit

Viktor Yegorovich Romanov (Russian: Виктор Егорович Романов; born 15 September 1937) is a Russian academician and retired cyclist. He won bronze medals at the 1960 Summer Olympics and the 1962 world championships in the 4000 m team pursuit; he won the world title in this event in 1963.

After graduating from the Saint Petersburg Textile Institute in 1963, he worked there, first as researcher, then as director of studies and vice-rector. In 1972 he was sent to Algeria where for three year he was an adviser of higher education. After returning to Russia he continued working at the same institute and in 1988 became its rector. He is a vice president of the Russian Union of Rectors.

Romanov holds a PhD in textile engineering. He is a full professor and a member of the Russian and international academies of engineering. He co-authored more than 200 scientific articles and 32 patents and supervised 37 PhD and 3 habilitation theses. In the periods of 1967–1972 and 1977–1984 he acted as deputy of Kuybyshev District Council (now part of the Tsentralny District, Saint Petersburg). He was awarded the Medal "For Distinguished Labour" (1960), Medal "For Labour Valour" (1970) and Order of the Red Banner of Labour (1981).

He is married and has two sons.
