= Egon Adler =

East German cyclist (1937–2015)

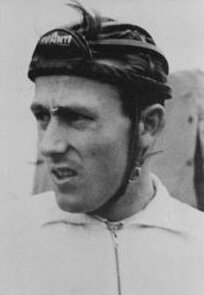
- Adler in 1960

Personal information
- Born: 18 February 1937 Großpösna, Nazi Germany
- Died: 28 January 2015 (aged 77) Leipzig, Germany

Cycling career
- Sport: Cycling
Medal record
Representing Germany
Men's track cycling
Olympic Games
Silver medal – second place	1960 Rome	Team Time Trial

Egon Adler (18 February 1937 – 28 January 2015) was a German cyclist. He won the silver medal in the team time trial event at the 1960 Summer Olympics He was born in Großpösna near Leipzig, Germany.

== Athletic career ==
At the age of 12, he competed in his first bike race on a bike he built himself. He was first a member of the club BSG Motor Stötteritz. Egon Adler, who was a trained roofer, later continued his career for SC Rotation Leipzig. In 1975 he achieved his first significant success by winning a prize in a mountain cycling race. It was the “Tribüne-Bergpreis” in Harz. He was also able to win this prize in 1959, 1963 and 1964. Egon Adler began his cycling career in 1949 as a twelve-year-old on a women's bike as a touring rider. After performing in his first two clubs, BSG Motor Stötteritz and SC Rotation, he moved to SC DHfK Leipzig later.

In 1955, he was successful at the cycling race “Rund um das Muldental” (English: Around the Muldental). In 1957, Adler finished 45th in the UCI Road World Championships race. In 1958 he took part in the “Friedensfahrt” (English: Peace Race) for the first time and won the longest stage from Görlitz to Berlin. In the overall individual ranking he took fifth place. He was able to repeat this success the following year, winning two more stages. In 1958 he became GDR champion in the team pursuit and 3rd in the overall individual ranking of the GDR tour (with two stage wins) and the following year, he became GDR champion in the team time trial. In 1959 he won the silver medal in the two-man team event at the GDR championships. At national level he won, among other things, the "Harz Mountain Prize".

In 1960, Adler again won two stages of the “Friedensfahrt” and, after his victory on the ninth stage, took over the overall leader's yellow jersey for the first time from his teammate Manfred Weißleder. After Weißleder took it away from him again with his success on the tenth stage, Adler won his lead back again on the distance to his hometown of Leipzig. He was able to maintain his lead in the overall standings until he had a serious fall on the final day. After he had just fought his way back to the main field on a substitute machine, he suffered a defect and finally lost contact with the peloton. The GDR team, which had previously been leading in the team rankings, ordered their captain Täve Schur and Weißleder to the rear for support. The trio followed the peloton for well over 150 kilometers without reaching the peloton again.

After winning was out of reach for both Adler and Weissleder, Erich Hagen went on to win the last stage in Berlin. This led to him winning the first place in the GDR as well as the highest amount of points in the single and team event. Egon Adler's total score led to him falling back onto the seventh place.

During the 1960 Summer Olympics in Rome, Adler took part in the first team time trial together with Täve Schur, Erich Hagen and Günter Lörke. After Lörke had to quit the race because of the burning heat, Adler took over for him, finishing the remaining kilometers in agony. For parts of this last stage he was pushed by his colleague Schur, however the team still managed to get the silver medal. At the UCI Road World Championships in 1960 held at the Sachsenring, he came in 9th place. He won the East German classic around Dortmund as well as the race Berlin-Leipzig in the same year.

At the end of the year, the successful Peace Race team including Schur, Adler, Hagen, Weissleder, Eckstein and Schober were named team of the year in the GDR. In 1961, Adler took part in the Peace Race for the fourth time in a row, however he was not performing as well as he did before. He had to forfeit at the 5th stage, yet he was able to win Cottbus-Goerlitz-Cottbus.

The year 1964 was the last time he was suggested for the GDR national team to take part in the German Olympic trials for Tokyo. His last success was at the Grand Prix of Torgau 1965.

After that, Adler only did motor-paced racing behind pacemaker Horst Aurich. He further was second place at the DDR-motor paced championships in 1965 and fifth place at the UCI Track Cycling World Championships in Anoeta close to San Sebastián in the same year. Adler finished his last race at the DDR-motor paced championships in 1966 as sixth place, which was his last race before his career end at age 29.

== Professional career and private life ==
Following his cycling career, Adler worked as an independent cab company owner. Egon Adler had three sisters, and his father was a successful cyclist as well. Adler's son Uwe Adler cycled for the SC DHfK Leipzig like his father, however, he was not as successful in the 80's as his father had been before him. Uwe won the DDR-two-person team cycling ranking in 1986, however. Egon Adler was the uncle of bike racer Robert Förster.

== Accomplishments ==
- Olympic silver medal in 100 km team time trial 1960
- Five stage wins at the international peace-tour (1958–1960)
- Three peace tour stages in the yellow jersey
