= Gisela Weiß =

German swimmer (born 1943)

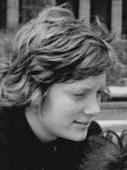
- Gisela Weiß in 1962

Personal information
- Born: 16 October 1943 (age 82) Böhmisch Kamnitz, Germany (present-day Česká Kamenice, Czech Republic)
- Height: 1.65 m (5 ft 5 in)
- Weight: 61 kg (134 lb)

Sport
- Sport: Swimming
- Club: SC DHfK
Medal record
Representing Germany
Olympic Games
Bronze medal – third place	1960 Rome	4×100 m freestyle relay

Gisela Weiß (later Engelhardt, born 16 October 1943) is a retired German swimmer. She competed at the 1960 Summer Olympics in the 400 m and 4 × 100 m freestyle events and won a bronze medal in the relay. Between 1959 and 1961, she won three consecutive national titles in the 4 × 100 m freestyle relay.

Weiß ended her competitive swimming career in 1963 and began studying medicine. In 1964, she married Karl-Heinz Engelhardt, a multiple East German champion in swimming.

After graduating, Weiß worked as a doctor, first at a sports school in Leipzig, and after the German unification in a rehabilitation clinic.
