= Aleksei Petrov (cyclist) =

Russian cyclist

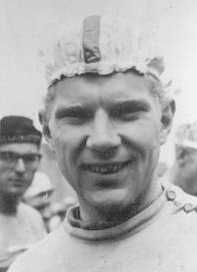
- Aleksei Petrov in 1961

Personal information
- Born: 22 March 1937 Leningrad, Russian SFSR, Soviet Union
- Died: 8 March 2009 (aged 71) Moscow, Russia
- Height: 1.77 m (5 ft 10 in)
- Weight: 76 kg (168 lb)

Sport
- Sport: Cycling
- Club: Trudovye Rezervy Leningrad
Medal record
Representing the Soviet Union
Olympic Games
Bronze medal – third place	1960 Rome	Team time trial

Aleksei Stepanovich Petrov (Russian: Алексей Степанович Петров; 22 March 1937 – 8 March 2009) was a Russian cyclist. He competed in the road race and 100 km team time trial at the 1960 and 1964 Summer Olympics. In the time trial he won a bronze medal in 1960 and finished in fifth place in 1964; in the road race he finished 62nd in 1964.

He competed in the team time trial at the world championships in 1962, 1964 and 1965, finishing in fourth, ninth and seventh place, respectively. In 1958 and 1959 he was second in the Tour d'Egypte and in 1962 won the Tour du Saint-Laurent in Canada. He won the Peace Race in 1961, 1962, 1965 and 1966 in the team competition; individually, his best results were fifth place in 1962 and sixth in 1966. Nationally, he won the individual road race in 1962 and in the team time trial in 1960, 1962–64 and 1966.
