= Viktor Kapitonov =

Soviet cyclist

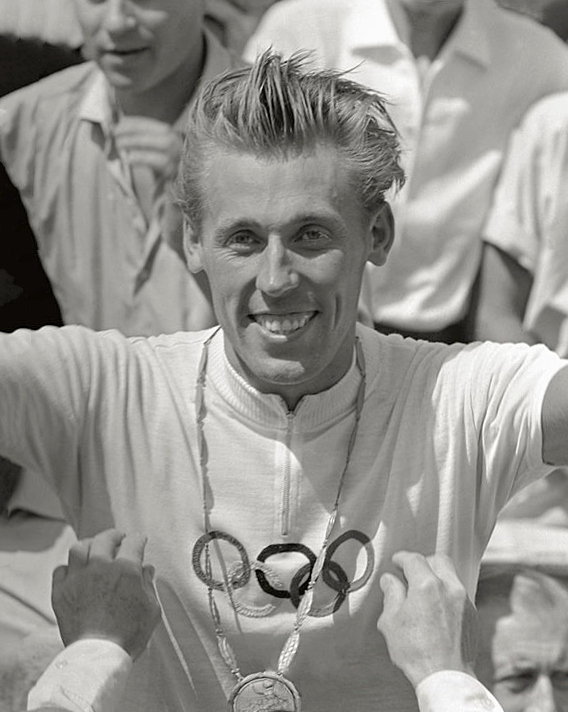
- Kapitonov at the 1960 Olympics

Personal information
- Full name: Viktor Arsenevich Kapitonov
- Born: 25 October 1933 Kalinin, Russian SFSR, Soviet Union
- Died: 2 March 2005 (aged 71) Moscow, Russia
- Height: 1.78 m (5 ft 10 in)
- Weight: 73 kg (161 lb)

Sport
- Sport: Cycling
- Event: Road race
- Club: Soviet Army Moscow
Medal record
Representing URS
Men's cycling
Olympic Games
Gold medal – first place	1960 Rome	Individual road race
Bronze medal – third place	1960 Rome	Team time trial

Viktor Arsenevich Kapitonov (Russian: Виктор Арсеньевич Капитонов, 25 October 1933 – 2 March 2005) was a Russian road cyclist who competed at the 1956 and 1960 Summer Olympics. In 1956, he finished 32nd individually and 6th with the Soviet team. In 1960, he won the individual road race and finished third in the 100 km team time trial. His gold medal was the first for Soviet cyclists. At the end of the race Kapitonov mistakenly sprinted for the finish with one lap to go, surprising his main rival Livio Trapè. In the last lap Trapè sprinted first, but Kapitonov caught him up in the last few meters.

Kapitonov was part of the Soviet teams that won the Peace Race in 1958, 1959, 1961 and 1962. He retired in 1965 and until 1985 coached the Soviet road racing team. He coached the Russian team in the 1993–96 Olympic cycle. In 1983, he defended a PhD in pedagogy.
