= Franco Testa =

Italian cyclist (1938–2025)

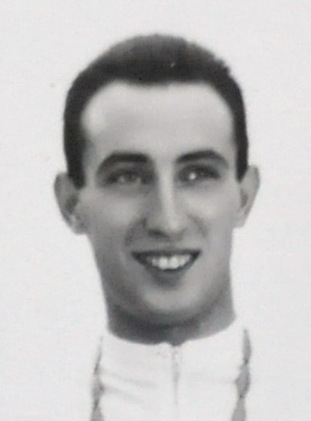
- Testa in the early 1960s

Personal information
- Born: 7 February 1938 Cadoneghe, Italy
- Died: 22 June 2025 (aged 87)
- Height: 1.70 m (5 ft 7 in)
- Weight: 65 kg (143 lb)

Cycling career
- Sport: Cycling
Medal record
Representing Italy
Olympic Games
Gold medal – first place	1960 Rome	Team pursuit
Silver medal – second place	1964 Tokyo	Team pursuit
World Championships
Silver medal – second place	1964 Paris	Team pursuit
Mediterranean Games
Silver medal – second place	1959 Beirut	Individual pursuit

Franco Testa (7 February 1938 – 22 June 2025) was an Italian cyclist. He won a gold medal in the team pursuit at the 1960 Summer Olympics and a silver medal at the 1964 Summer Olympics. Testa also won two gold medals and a silver at the Mediterranean Games and a team silver medal at the world championships in 1964.

== Biography ==
Testa was born on 4 February 1938 in Cadoneghe, in the province of Padua, Italy. When young, he moved to the town of Mogliano Veneto, where he worked for a bakery. He also worked as a farm laborer, and with money earned from this, purchased a bicycle. Testa later joined the cycling club G.S. Mogliano, subsequently moving to the clubs Trevigiani and then Ciclisti Padovani. He recalled that during his career, "I trained every day on my own, I would wake up at dawn and go running, I would run around our countryside, galloping it far and wide, in summer and winter, in the dark and in the light, with sun or rain, sometimes even snow".

Testa became the Italian champion in the pursuit event and won the title three years in a row. He was also a four-time Italian team pursuit champion. He was a member of the Italian national team for five years. In 1959, he placed seventh in the amateur pursuit event at the UCI Track Cycling World Championships. That same year, Testa also competed for Italy at the 1959 Mediterranean Games, winning the silver medal in the individual pursuit while being a member of the gold medal-winning team in the team pursuit.

The following year, Testa was the favorite to win gold at the 1960 UCI Track Cycling World Championships in the amateur individual pursuit, but in the quarterfinals, he broke the toe clip of his pedal at the start, resulting in him not finishing. Protests from the Italian team that the race should have been restarted were unsuccessful. Testa was also selected to compete at the 1960 Summer Olympics in Rome, being a member of the Italian team in the team pursuit event. He competed alongside Luigi Arienti, Mario Vallotto and Marino Vigna and won the gold medal in the event. Testa won the Italian Cup in the team time trial in 1960, 1961, and 1964. In 1963, he won the gold medal in the team pursuit at the Mediterranean Games. He returned to the Olympics in 1964, winning the silver medal in the team pursuit along with Luigi Roncaglia, Carlo Rancati and Cencio Mantovani.

In 1964, Testa also won silver in that event at the world championships. Testa turned professional in 1965 and finished second at the national championships behind Leandro Faggin. He only competed briefly as a professional before quitting the sport to open a butcher shop in Mogliano, stating that "I couldn't live on cycling alone". Testa was awarded the Order of Merit of the Italian Republic, first as a Knight, then Commander and finally as a Grand Officer. In 2015, he was honored with the Gold Collar for Sporting Merit, the highest honor for Italian sportspeople. A book was written on his life by Lucio Carraro in 2017. Testa was married and had four children, including a son who became a parish priest.

== Death ==
Testa died on 22 June 2025, at the age of 87.
