= Marino Vigna =

Italian cyclist (born 1938)

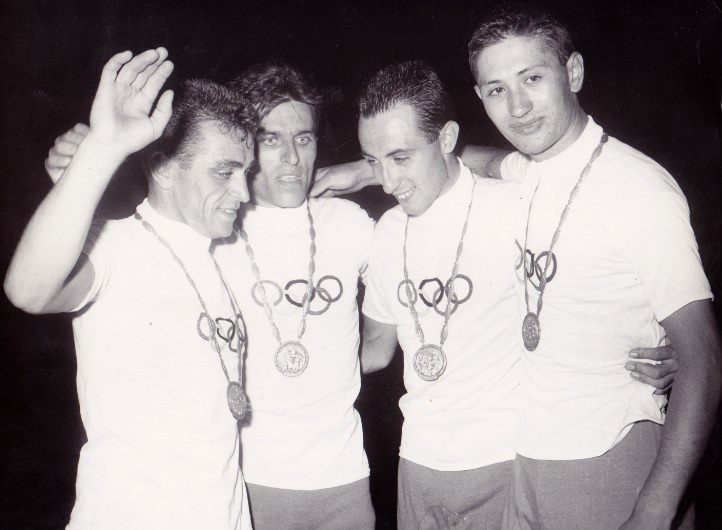
- Luigi Arienti, Mario Vallotto, Franco Testa and Marino Vigna (right) at the 1960 Olympics

Personal information
- Born: 6 November 1938 (age 87) Milan, Italy
- Height: 1.72 m (5 ft 8 in)
- Weight: 67 kg (148 lb)

Cycling career
- Sport: Cycling
Medal record
Event / 1st / 2nd / 3rd; Summer Olympics / 1 / 0 / 0
Representing Italy
Olympic Games
Gold medal – first place	1960 Rome	4000 m team pursuit

Marino Vigna (born 6 November 1938) is an Italian retired cyclist who won a gold medal in the team pursuit at the 1960 Summer Olympics.

After the Olympics, he became a professional road racer and won one stage of the Giro d'Italia in 1963; the Tre Valli Varesine and one stage of the Tour de Romandie in 1964; the Trofeo Laigueglia in 1965, and the Milano–Torino in 1966.

He later became a sports director for cycling teams, directing the Faema team in the 1969 Giro d'Italia when their star Eddy Merckx was expelled for a doping violation.

== See also ==
- Italy national cycling team – Olympic Games
