= Arnold Belgardt =

Russian cyclist

Personal information
- Born: 29 January 1937 Leningrad, Russian SFSR, Soviet Union
- Died: 26 February 2015 (aged 78)
- Height: 1.85 m (6 ft 1 in)
- Weight: 80 kg (180 lb)

Sport
- Sport: Cycling
- Club: Trud Leningrad
Medal record
Representing the Soviet Union
Olympic Games
Bronze medal – third place	1960 Rome	Team pursuit
World Championships
Gold medal – first place	1963 Rocourt	Team pursuit
Bronze medal – third place	1962 Milan	Team pursuit
Bronze medal – third place	1964 Paris	Team pursuit

Arnold Arturovich Belgardt (Russian: Арнольд Артурович Бельгардт; 29 January 1937 – 26 February 2015) was a Russian cyclist. He won bronze medals at the 1960 Summer Olympics and the 1962 and 1964 world championships in the 4000 m team pursuit; he won the world title in this event in 1963.
