= Bernhard Knubel =

West German rower (1938–1973)

Personal information
- Born: 2 March 1938 Brotdorf, Germany
- Died: 23 February 1973 (aged 34)

Sport
- Sport: Rowing
Medal record
Men's rowing
Gold medal – first place	1960 Rome	Coxed pair

Bernhard Knubel (2 March 1938 – 23 February 1973) was a West German rower who competed for the United Team of Germany in the 1960 Summer Olympics.

He was born in Brotdorf but his home town was Minden. In 1960, he was a crew member of the German boat that won the gold medal in the coxed pair event. He died in Gelsenkirchen in 1973 from cancer.
