= Luigi Arienti =

Italian cyclist (1937–2024)

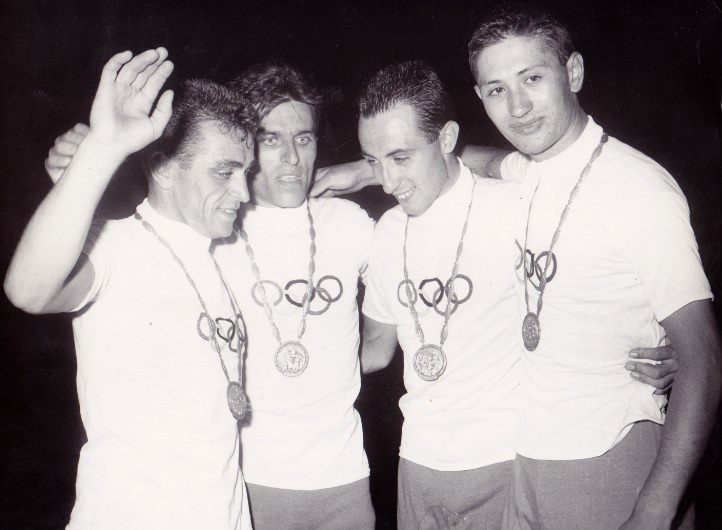
- Luigi Arienti (left), Mario Vallotto, Franco Testa and Marino Vigna at the 1960 Olympics

Personal information
- Born: 6 January 1937 Desio, Italy
- Died: 7 February 2024 (aged 87) Desio, Italy
- Height: 1.68 m (5 ft 6 in)
- Weight: 65 kg (143 lb; 10.2 st)

Cycling career
- Sport: Cycling
- Current team: Retired
- Discipline: Track cycling
- Role: Rider
Medal record
Representing Italy
Men's track cycling
Olympic Games
Gold medal – first place	1960 Rome	4000 m team pursuit

Luigi Arienti (6 January 1937 – 7 February 2024) was an Italian racing cyclist. At the 1960 Summer Olympics, he and teammates Marino Vigna, Mario Vallotto, and Franco Testa won an Olympic gold medal in the team pursuit, with a time of 4:30.90.

Arienti was one of the best Italian amateur cyclists in 1960, and was selected for the Olympic games. After the Olympic Games, Arienti became professional, focussing on track events and six-day racing. After 1972 he ended his career. After the retirement, he served as managing director of the Salus Seregno junior team. In 2015, he the Italian National Olympic Committee awarded him the Collare d'Oro for sporting merits.

Arienti died in Desio on 7 February 2024, at the age of 87.
