= Bernd Barleben =

East German cyclist

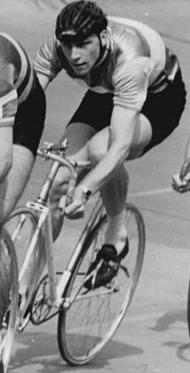
- Bernd Barleben in 1961

Personal information
- Born: 1 January 1940 (age 86) Berlin, Germany

Cycling career
- Sport: Cycling
- Discipline: Track
- Role: Rider
Medal record
Representing Germany
Men's track cycling
Olympic Games
Silver medal – second place	1960 Rome	team pursuit

Bernd Barleben (1 January 1940) is a former German cyclist. He won the silver medal in team pursuit at the 1960 Summer Olympics
