= Manfred Klieme =

German cyclist (born 1936)

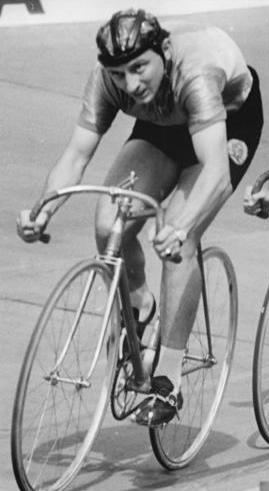
- Manfred Klieme in 1961

Personal information
- Born: 3 February 1936 (age 90) Berlin, Germany

Cycling career
- Sport: Cycling
Medal record
Representing Germany
Men's cycling
Olympic Games
Silver medal – second place	1960 Rome	team pursuit

Manfred Klieme (born 3 February 1936) is a former East German racing cyclist, who won a silver medal at the 1960 Summer Olympics in Rome.

He was born in Berlin.

Klieme competed for the SC Dynamo Berlin / Sportvereinigung (SV) Dynamo.
