= Jürgen Litz =

German rower (born 1938)

Olympic medal record

Men's rowing
| Gold medal – first place | 1960 Rome | Coxed four |

Jürgen Litz (born 8 October 1938) is a German rower who competed for the United Team of Germany in the 1960 Summer Olympics.

He was born in Essen.

In 1960 he was a crew member of the West German boat which won the gold medal in the coxed fours event.
