= Sante Gaiardoni =

Italian cyclist (1939–2023)

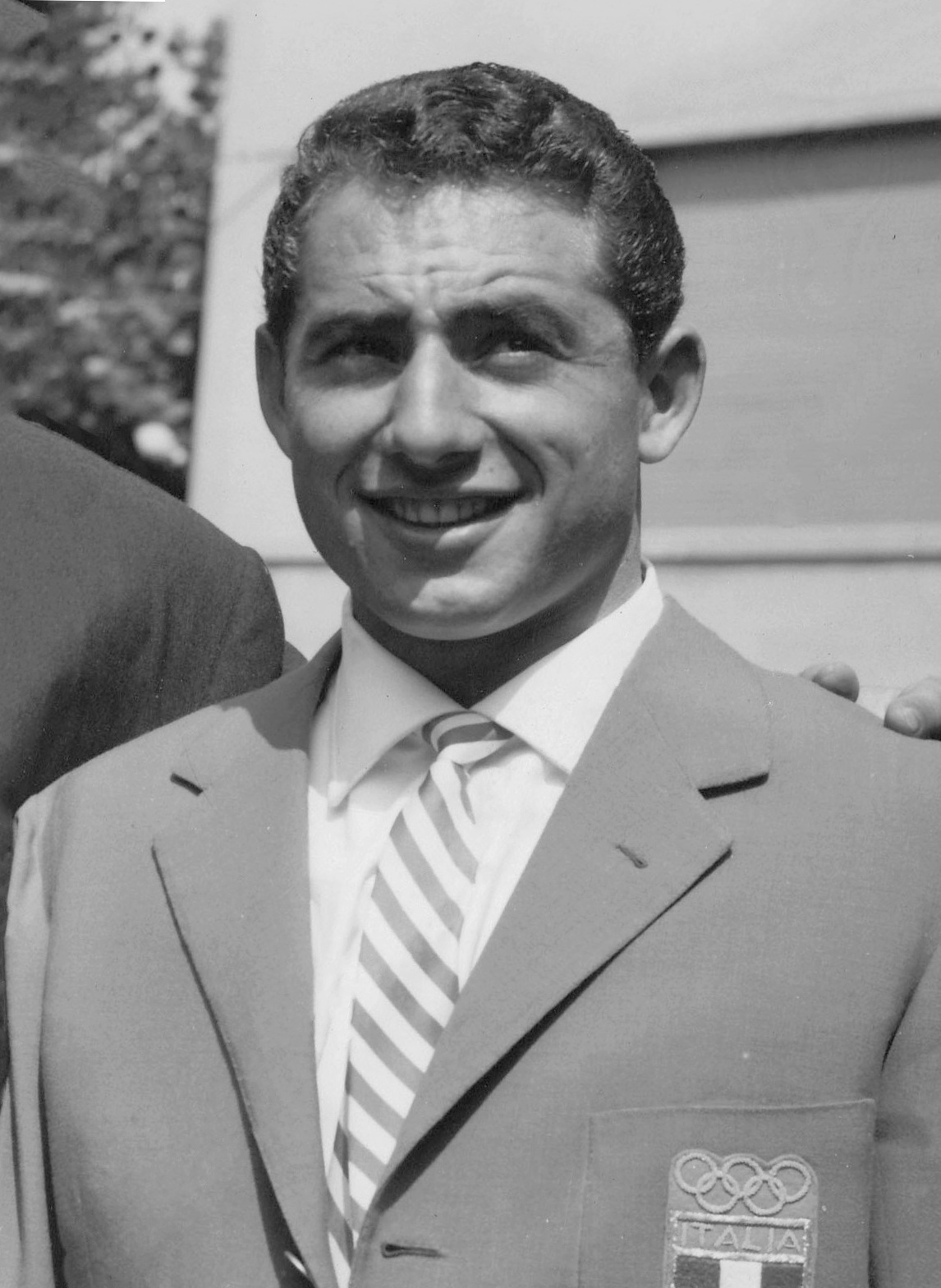
- Gaiardoni at the 1960 Olympics

Personal information
- Full name: Sante Gaiardoni
- Born: 29 June 1939 Villafranca di Verona, Italy
- Died: 30 November 2023 (aged 84) Motta Visconti, Italy
- Height: 1.68 m (5 ft 6 in)
- Weight: 66 kg (146 lb; 10.4 st)

Cycling career
- Sport: Cycling
- Role: Rider
Medal record
Representing Italy
Olympic Games
Gold medal – first place	1960 Rome	1000 m time trial
Gold medal – first place	1960 Rome	Sprint
UCI Track Cycling World Championships
Silver medal – second place	1958 Paris	Sprint, amateurs
Silver medal – second place	1959 Amsterdam	Sprint, amateurs
Gold medal – first place	1960 Leipzig	Sprint, amateurs
Silver medal – second place	1962 Milan	Sprint, professionals
Gold medal – first place	1963 Rocourt	Sprint, professionals
Bronze medal – third place	1966 Frankfurt	Sprint, professionals
Bronze medal – third place	1969 Antwerp	Sprint, professionals
Silver medal – second place	1970 Leicester	Sprint, professionals

Sante Gaiardoni (29 June 1939 – 30 November 2023) was an Italian cyclist. He won two gold medals at the 1960 Olympic Games in Rome, in the 1000 m time trial and the 1000 m sprint. Between 1958 and 1970 he won two gold, four silver and two bronze medals in sprint events at the UCI Track Cycling World Championships.

== Biography ==
After retirement in 1971 he ran a bicycle shop in Lorenteggio, Milan. In the 2000s he was active in politics and took part in the 2006 Italian municipal elections. In 2010, together with journalist Francesco Lodi, he published a book Quando la Rabbia si trasforma in Vittoria ("When the anger turns into victory") describing his early life until 1960. Gaiardoni died in Motta Visconti on 30 November 2023, at the age of 84.

== Awards ==
On 7 May 2015, in the presence of the President of the Italian National Olympic Committee (CONI), Giovanni Malagò, Gaiardoni was inaugurated into the Olympic Park of the Foro Italico in Rome, along with Viale delle Olimpiadi, the Walk of Fame of Italian sport, consisting of 100 tiles that chronologically report names of the most representative athletes in the history of Italian sport. On each tile there is the name of the sportsman, the sport in which he distinguished himself and the symbol of CONI. One of the tiles is dedicated to Sante Gaiardoni.

== See also ==
- Legends of Italian sport - Walk of Fame
