= Siegfried Köhler (cyclist) =

German cyclist (born 1935)

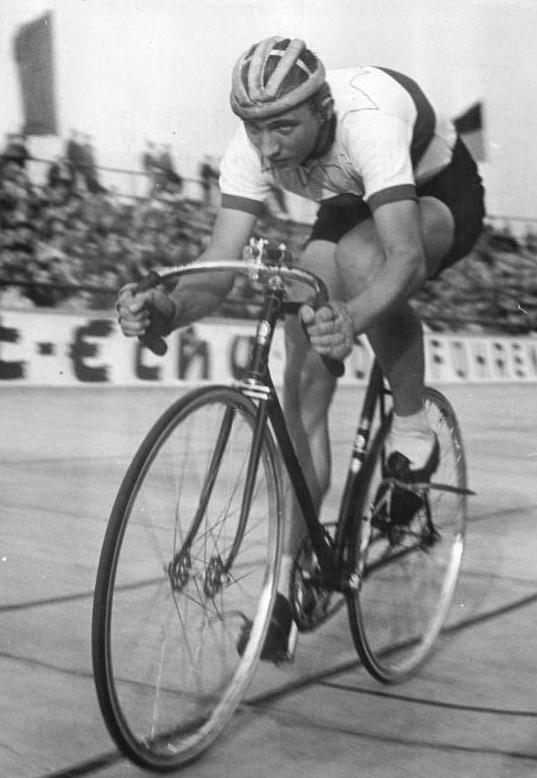

Personal information
- Born: 6 October 1935 (age 91) Forst, Brandenburg, Germany
- Died: 11 July 2024 (aged 88) Potsdam, Brandenburg, Germany

Cycling career
- Sport: Cycling
- Discipline: Track
- Role: Rider
Medal record
Representing Germany
Men's track cycling
Olympic Games
Silver medal – second place	1960 Rome	team pursuit

Siegfried Köhler (born 6 October 1935) is a German cyclist. He won the silver medal in team pursuit in the 1960 Summer Olympics.

== Early life and family ==
Siegfried Köhler was born in Forst, Brandenburg, Germany.
