= Peter Gröning =

East German track cyclist

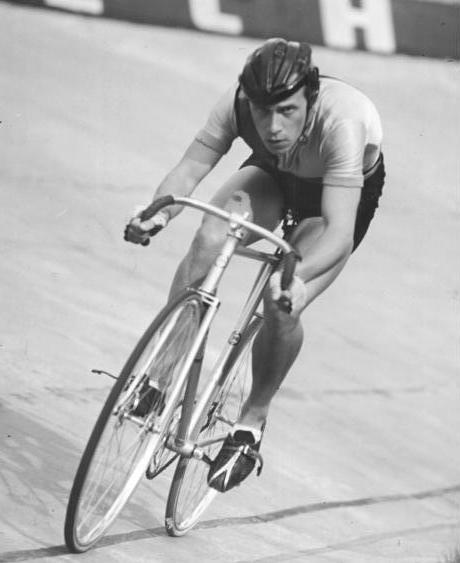
- Peter Gröning, 1960

Personal information
- Born: 29 April 1939 (age 87) Berlin, Germany

Cycling career
- Sport: Cycling
Medal record
Representing Germany
Men's cycling
Olympic Games
Silver medal – second place	1960 Rome	team pursuit

Peter Gröning (born 29 April 1939) is a former East German track cyclist. Gröning competed for the SC Dynamo Berlin / Sportvereinigung (SV) Dynamo. He won the silver medal at the 1960 Olympics in Rome in the 4000-m team pursuit.
