= Erich Hagen =

German cyclist

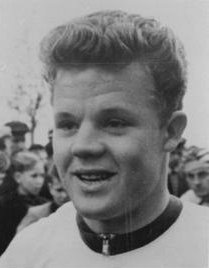
- Erich Hagen in 1960

Personal information
- Born: 11 December 1936 Leipzig, Germany
- Died: 22 May 1978 (aged 41) Leipzig, East Germany
- Height: 1.74 m (5 ft 9 in)
- Weight: 74 kg (163 lb)

Sport
- Sport: Cycling
- Club: SC DHfK, Leipzig
Medal record
Representing Germany
Olympic Games
Silver medal – second place	1960 Rome	Team time trial

Erich Hagen (11 December 1936 – 22 May 1978) was a German cyclist who competed at the 1956 and 1960 Summer Olympics. His sporting career began with SC Wissenschaft Leipzig. In 1956, he finished in 22nd place in the individual road race. His team won a bronze medal in the road race, but he did not score. In 1960, he won a silver medal in the 100 km team time trial and finished 21st in the road race.

In 1960, he won the multistage Peace Race. Nationally, he won three titles between 1956 and 1958. He won the DDR Rundfahrt in 1958. After retiring from cycling he worked as a taxi driver and died in a road crash.
