= Ottavio Cogliati =

Italian cyclist

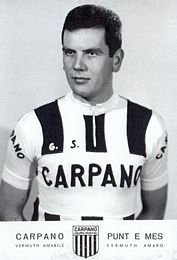
- Ottavio Cogliati in 1963

Personal information
- Born: 4 June 1939 Nerviano, Italy
- Died: 20 April 2008 (aged 68) Magenta, Italy
- Height: 173 cm (5 ft 8 in)
- Weight: 69 kg (152 lb)

Cycling career
- Sport: Cycling
Medal record
Representing ITA
Olympic Games
Gold medal – first place	1960 Rome	Team time trial

Ottavio Cogliati (4 June 1939 – 20 April 2008) was an Italian cyclist who won a gold medal in the team time trial at the 1960 Summer Olympics. After that he turned professional and rode the 1962 and 1963 Tour de France. He retired in 1964, and later worked as a salesman of alcoholic beverages.
