= Livio Trapè =

Italian cyclist (born 1937)

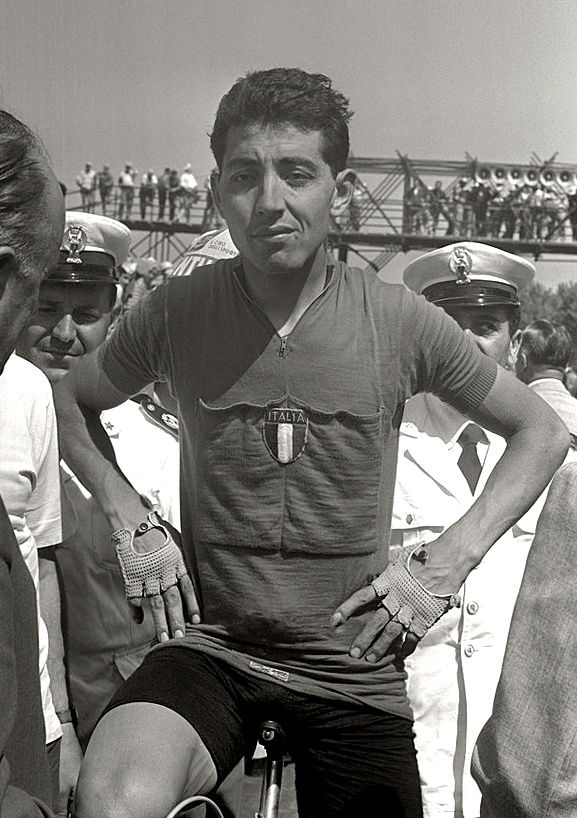
- Livio Trapè at the 1960 Olympics

Personal information
- Born: 26 May 1937 (age 89) Montefiascone, Italy
- Height: 1.80 m (5 ft 11 in)
- Weight: 75 kg (165 lb)

Cycling career
- Sport: Cycling
Medal record
Representing ITA
Olympic Games
Gold medal – first place	1960 Rome	Team time trial
Silver medal – second place	1960 Rome	Road race

Livio Trapè (born 26 May 1937) is a former Italian cyclist. At the 1960 Olympics he won a gold medal in the team time trial and a silver medal in the individual road race. After that he turned professional and competed until 1966, albeit with little success.
