= Mario Vallotto =

Italian cyclist (1933–1966)

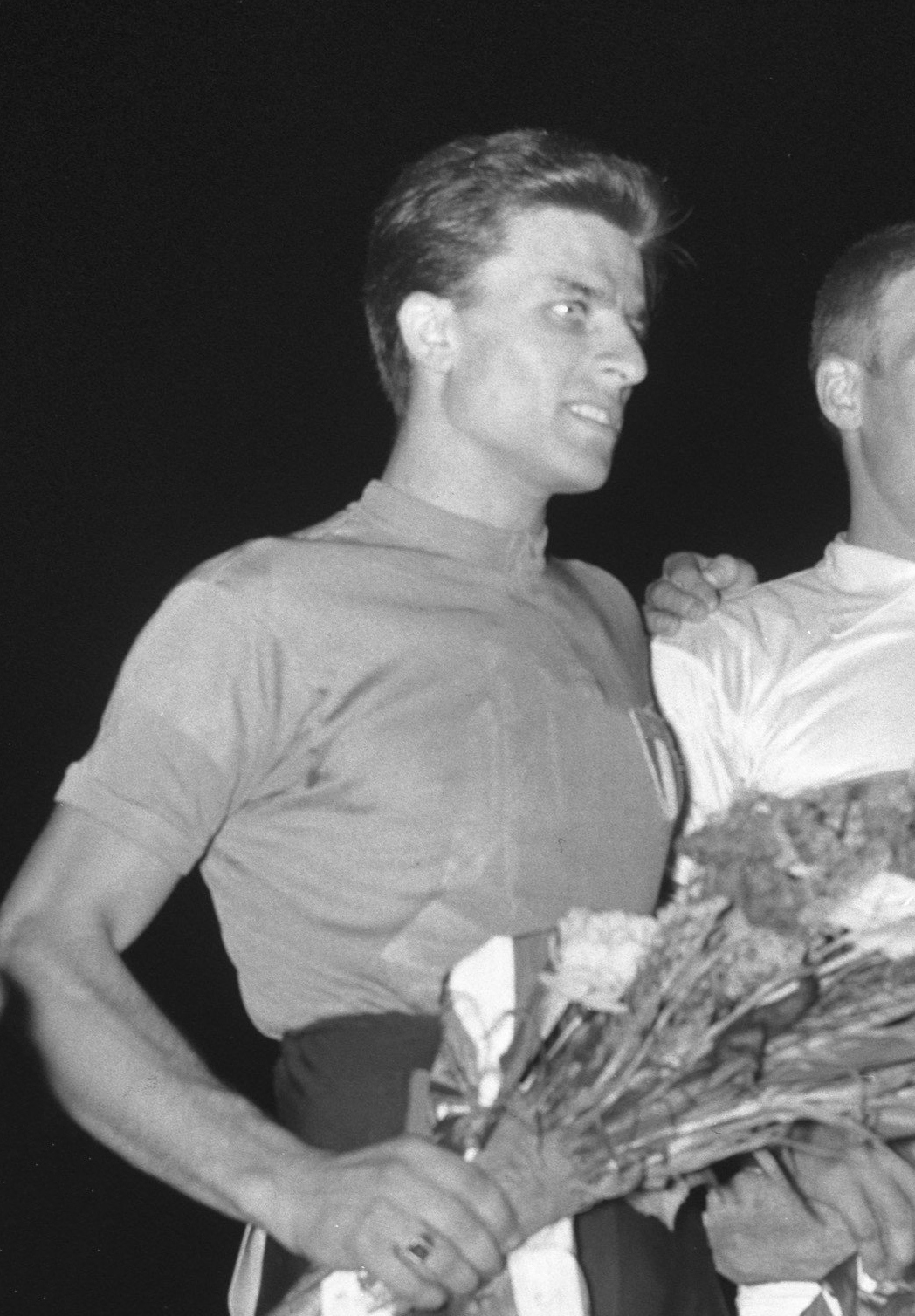
- Vallotto at the 1959 World Championships

Personal information
- Born: 18 November 1933 Mirano, Italy
- Died: 22 April 1966 (aged 32) Padua, Italy
- Height: 172 cm (5 ft 8 in)
- Weight: 69 kg (152 lb)

Cycling career
- Sport: Cycling
Medal record
Representing ITA
Olympic Games
Gold medal – first place	1960 Rome	Team pursuit
World Championships
Silver medal – second place	1959 Amsterdam	Individual pursuit
Mediterranean Games
Gold medal – first place	1959 Beirut	Individual pursuit

Mario Vallotto (18 November 1933 – 22 April 1966) was an Italian cyclist. He won a gold medal in the team pursuit at the 1960 Summer Olympics. A year earlier he won the individual pursuit at the Mediterranean Games and finished second at the world championships.
