= Swimming at the 1960 Summer Olympics – Women's 4 × 100 metre medley relay =

Women's 4 × 100 metre medley relay at the Games of the XVII Olympiad
- Venue: Stadio Olimpico del Nuoto
- Dates: 30 August 1960 (heats); 2 September 1960 (final)
- Competitors: 56 from 12 nations
- Teams: 12
- Winning time: 4:41.1 WR

Medalists
1st place, gold medalist(s)		Lynn Burke, Patty Kempner, Carolyn Schuler, Chris von Saltza, Anne Warner*, Carolyn Wood*, Joan Spillane*	United States
2nd place, silver medalist(s)		Marilyn Wilson, Rosemary Lassig, Jan Andrew, Dawn Fraser, Gergaynia Beckett*, Ilsa Konrads*	Australia
3rd place, bronze medalist(s)		Ingrid Schmidt, Ursula Küper, Bärbel Fuhrmann, Ursel Brunner *Swimmers who participated in the heats only. Under 1960 Olympic rules, they did not receive a medal.	Germany

The women's 4 × 100 metre medley relay event at the 1960 Olympic Games took place on August 30 (qualification) and September 2 (final). This swimming event uses medley swimming as a relay. Because an Olympic size swimming pool is 50 metres long, each of the four swimmers completed two lengths of the pool, each using a different stroke. The first on each team used the backstroke, the second used the breaststroke, the third used the butterfly stroke, and the final swimmer used freestyle (restricted to not allow any of the first three strokes to be used, though nearly all swimmers use front crawl regardless).

The first swimmer must touch the wall before the next can leave the starting block, and so forth; timing of the starts is thus important.

== Results ==
=== Heats ===
Heat 1

Place	Swimmers	Time	Notes
1	Sylvia Lewis, Anita Lonsbrough, Natalie Steward, Jean Oldroyd (GBR)	4:49.0	
2	Lynn Burke, Anne Warner, Carolyn Wood, Joan Spillane (USA)	4:49.3	
3	Ingrid Schmidt, Ursula Küper, Bärbel Fuhrmann, Ursel Brunner (GER)	4:49.6	
4	Magda Dávid, Klára Killermann-Bartos, Márta Egerváry, Csilla Madarász-Bajnogel-Dobai (HUN)	4:52.8	
5	Rosy Piacentini, Michèle Pialat, Annie Caron, Héda Frost (FRA)	4:59.7	
6	Daniela Serpilli, Elena Zennaro, Anna Beneck, Paola Saini (ITA)	5:04.4	

Heat 2

Place	Swimmers	Time	Notes
1	Ria van Velsen, Ada den Haan, Tineke Lagerberg, Erica Terpstra (NED)	4:47.4	
2	Larisa Viktorova, Lyudmila Korobova, Valentina Poznyak, Marina Shamal (URS)	4:54.4	
3	Satoko Tanaka, Yoshiko Takamatsu, Shizue Miyabe, Yoshiko Sato (JPN)	4:54.5	NR
4	Gergaynia Beckett, Rosemary Lassig, Jan Andrew, Ilsa Konrads (AUS)	4:55.7	
5	Sara Barber, Judith McHale, Margaret Iwasaki, Mary Beth Stewart (CAN)	4:59.5	
6	Lynette Cooper, Meg Miners, Dottie Sutcliffe, Hillary Wilson (RHO)	5:12.9	

=== Final ===
Place	Swimmers	Time	Notes
1st place, gold medalist(s)	Lynn Burke, Patty Kempner, Carolyn Schuler, Chris von Saltza (USA)	4:41.1	WR
2nd place, silver medalist(s)	Marilyn Wilson, Rosemary Lassig, Jan Andrew, Dawn Fraser (AUS)	4:45.9	
3rd place, bronze medalist(s)	Ingrid Schmidt, Ursula Küper, Bärbel Fuhrmann, Ursel Brunner (GER)	4:47.6	
4	Ria van Velsen, Ada den Haan, Marianne Heemskerk, Erica Terpstra (NED)	4:47.6	
5	Sylvia Lewis, Anita Lonsbrough, Sheila Watt, Natalie Steward (GBR)	4:47.6	
6	Magda Dávid, Klára Killermann-Bartos, Márta Egerváry, Csilla Madarász-Bajnogel-Dobai (HUN)	4:53.7	
7	Satoko Tanaka, Yoshiko Takamatsu, Shizue Miyabe, Yoshiko Sato (JPN)	4:56.4	
8	Larisa Viktorova, Lyudmila Korobova, Zinaida Belovetskaya, Marina Shamal (URS)	4:58.1	
