= Australia at the 1960 Summer Olympics =

- IOC code: AUS
- NOC: Australian Olympic Federation

in Rome
- Competitors: 189 (160 men, 29 women) in 17 sports
- Flag bearer: Alex Sturrock (opening)
- Medals Ranked 5th: Gold 8 Silver 8 Bronze 6 Total 22

Summer Olympics appearances (overview)
- 1896; 1900; 1904; 1908; 1912; 1920; 1924; 1928; 1932; 1936; 1948; 1952; 1956; 1960; 1964; 1968; 1972; 1976; 1980; 1984; 1988; 1992; 1996; 2000; 2004; 2008; 2012; 2016; 2020; 2024

Other related appearances
- 1906 Intercalated Games –––– Australasia (1908–1912)

Australia, the previous host of the 1956 Summer Olympics in Melbourne (with the exception of the Equestrian events, which was held in Stockholm, Sweden), competed at the 1960 Summer Olympics in Rome, Italy. 189 competitors, 160 men and 29 women, took part in 122 events in 17 sports. Australian athletes have competed in every Summer Olympic Games.

== Medalists ==
=== Gold ===
- Herb Elliott — Athletics, Men's 1500 metres
- Lawrence Morgan — Equestrian, Three-Day Event Individual Competition
- Lawrence Morgan, Neale Lavis and Bill Roycroft — Equestrian, Three-Day Event Team Competition
- John Devitt — Swimming, Men's 100 m Freestyle
- Murray Rose — Swimming, Men's 400 m Freestyle
- John Konrads — Swimming, Men's 1500 m Freestyle
- David Theile — Swimming, Men's 100 m Backstroke
- Dawn Fraser — Swimming, Women's 100 m Freestyle

=== Silver ===
- Noel Freeman — Athletics, Men's 20 km Walk
- Brenda Jones — Athletics, Women's 800 metres
- Neale Lavis — Equestrian, Three-Day Event Individual Competition
- Neville Hayes — Swimming, Men's 200 m Butterfly
- Murray Rose — Swimming, Men's 1500 m Freestyle
- Janice Andrew, Dawn Fraser, Rosemary Lassig, and Marilyn Wilson — Swimming, Women's 4 × 100 m Medley Relay
- Alva Colquhoun, Dawn Fraser, Lorraine Crapp, and Ilsa Konrads — Swimming, Women's 4 × 100 m Freestyle Relay
- Terry Gathercole, Neville Hayes, Geoffrey Shipton, and David Theile — Swimming, Men's 4 × 100 m Medley Relay

=== Bronze ===
- David Power — Athletics, Men's 10000 metres
- Oliver Taylor — Boxing, Men's Bantamweight
- Tony Madigan — Boxing, Men's Light Heavyweight
- John Konrads — Swimming, Men's 400 m Freestyle
- Janice Andrew — Swimming, Women's 100 m Butterfly
- John Devitt, David Dickson, John Konrads, and Murray Rose — Swimming, Men's 4 × 200 m Freestyle Relay

== Athletics ==
Women's 800 metres

- Dixie Willis
  - Heat — 2:05.9
  - Final — did not finish (→ no ranking)

== Cycling ==
Len Williams from Coffs Harbour was nominated for the team but declined due to work commitments

Nine male cyclists represented Australia in 1960.

Individual road race

- Frank Brazier
- Alan Grindal
- Garry Jones
- Robert Whetters

Team time trial

- Warren Scarfe
- Garry Jones
- Alan Grindal
- Frank Brazier

Sprint

- Ron Baensch

1000m time trial

- Ian Chapman

Tandem

- Ian Browne
- Geoff Smith

Team pursuit

- Warren Scarfe
- Garry Jones
- Robert Whetters
- Frank Brazier

== Diving ==
Men

Athlete	Event	Preliminary		Semi-final				Final			
Athlete	Event	Points	Rank	Points	Rank	Total	Rank	Points	Rank	Total	Rank
Kenneth Crotty	3 m springboard	43.40	27	Did not advance							
Graham Deuble	3 m springboard	51.48	16 Q	37.78	15	89.26	16	Did not advance			
Barry Holmes	10 m platform	40.24	27	Did not advance							

Women

Athlete	Event	Preliminary		Semi-final				Final			
Athlete	Event	Points	Rank	Points	Rank	Total	Rank	Points	Rank	Total	Rank
Susan Knight	3 m springboard	46.19	14 Q	37.06	8	83.25	12	Did not advance			
Susan Knight	10 m platform	43.03	18	—N/a				Did not advance			

== Fencing ==
11 fencers, 9 men and 2 women, represented Australia in 1960.

Men's foil

- Brian McCowage
- Ivan Lund
- Michael Sichel

Men's team foil

- Brian McCowage, Michael Sichel, Zoltan Okalyi, David McKenzie

Men's épée

- Richard Stone
- Keith Hackshall
- John Simpson

Men's team épée

- Ivan Lund, Richard Stone, John Humphreys, John Simpson, Keith Hackshall

Men's sabre

- Michael Sichel
- Keith Hackshall

Women's foil

- Kate Baxter
- Johanna Winter

== Modern pentathlon ==
Three male pentathlete represented Australia in 1960.

Individual

- Neville Sayers
- Hugh Doherty
- Peter Macken

Team

- Neville Sayers
- Hugh Doherty
- Peter Macken

== Rowing ==
Australia had 25 male rowers participate in six out of seven rowing events in 1960.

Men

Athlete	Event	Heats		Repechage		Semifinals		Final	
Athlete	Event	Time	Rank	Time	Rank	Time	Rank	Time	Rank
Ian Tutty; Kevyn Webb	double sculls	7:16.41	6 R	7:12.37	5 DNQ	N/A		Did not qualify	
Terry Davies; John Hunt	coxless pairs	7:51.88	4 R	7:24.22	2 SF	7:50.59	5 DNQ	Did not qualify	
Paul Guest; Walter Howell; Ian Johnston (cox)	coxed pairs	7:49.06	4 R	7:47.82	4 DNQ	N/A		Did not qualify	
Peter Gillon; Peter Guest; Kim Jelbart; Brian Vear	coxless fours	6:49.83	4 R	6:45.25	4 DNQ	N/A		Did not qualify	
Mick Allen; Max Annett; John Hudson; Peter Waddington; Lionel Robberds (cox)	coxed fours	6:47.23	2 R	6:47.31	2 SF	7:05.04	2 F	6:45.80	5
Alexander Cunningham; Berry Durston; Milton Francis; Maxwell Gamble; Geoffrey Hale; John Ledder; Roger Ninham; John Rosser; Terrence Scook (cox)	eights	6:16.94	2 R	6:31.15	4 DNQ	N/A		Did not qualify	

== Sailing ==
Open

Athlete	Event	Race							Net points	Final rank
Athlete	Event	1	2	3	4	5	6	7	Net points	Final rank
Ronald Jenyns	Finn	6	6	~~DNF~~	6	2	3	10	5758	4
Rolly Tasker; Ian Palmer	Flying Dutchman	17	11	19	9	8	20	~~23~~	2845	18
Robert French; Jack Downey	Star	13	~~21~~	20	21	21	10	20	1736	18
Harold Brooke; John Coon; Alan Cain	Dragon	8	10	8	6	15	~~19~~	5	3733	11
Jock Sturrock; David Bingham; Ernest Wagstaff	5.5 Metre	4	12	2	13	14	12	~~18~~	2959	10

== Shooting ==
Seven shooters represented Australia in 1960.

Men

Athlete	Event	Qualifying		Final	
Athlete	Event	Score	Rank	Score	Rank
John Holt	300 m rifle	1030	17 Q	1030	34
Rodney Johnson	50 m pistol	329	27 Q	527	32
Michael Papps	25 m pistol	—N/a		569	31
Norman Rule	50 m rifle, three positions	549	14 Q	1095	45
Norman Rule	50 m rifle, prone	382	24 Q	569	47
Neville Sayers	25 m pistol	—N/a		552	43
Don Tolhurst	50 m rifle, three positions	540	22 Q	1113	27
Don Tolhurst	50 m rifle, prone	383	16 Q	574	38
Don Tolhurst	300 m rifle	533	14 Q	1049	31
John Tremelling	50 m pistol	344	17 Q	534	21

== Swimming ==
Men

Athlete	Event	Heat		Semifinal		Final	
Athlete	Event	Time	Rank	Time	Rank	Time	Rank
John Devitt	100 m freestyle	56.0	2 Q	55.8	3 Q	55.2 OR	1st place, gold medalist(s)
Jon Henricks	100 m freestyle	56.9	11 Q	57.2	12	Did not advance	
John Konrads	400 m freestyle	4:24.3	5 Q	—N/a		4:21.8	3rd place, bronze medalist(s)
Murray Rose	400 m freestyle	4:22.5	4 Q	—N/a		4:18.3 OR	1st place, gold medalist(s)
John Konrads	1500 m freestyle	17:52.0	3 Q	—N/a		17:19.6 OR	1st place, gold medalist(s)
Murray Rose	1500 m freestyle	17:32.8	1 Q	—N/a		17:21.7	2nd place, silver medalist(s)
John Monckton	100 m backstroke	1:04.4	7 Q	1:03.8	4 Q	1:04.1	7
David Theile	100 m backstroke	1:03.1	3 Q	1:03.1	1 Q	1:01.9 OR	1st place, gold medalist(s)
William Burton	200 m breaststroke	2:43.9	20	Did not advance			
Terry Gathercole	200 m breaststroke	2:41.7	12 Q	2:39.1	4 Q	2:40.2	6
Kevin Berry	200 m butterfly	2:18.9	5 Q	2:23.1	8 Q	2:18.5	6
Neville Hayes	200 m butterfly	2:18.1	3 Q	2:21.6	6 Q	2:14.6	2nd place, silver medalist(s)
David Dickson; John Devitt; Murray Rose; John Konrads; John Rigby; Allan Wood	4 × 200 m freestyle	8:24.2	3 Q	—N/a		8:13.8	3rd place, bronze medalist(s)
David Theile; Terry Gathercole; Neville Hayes; Geoff Shipton; Julian Carroll; William Burton; Kevin Berry	4 × 100 m medley	4:14.8	2 Q	—N/a		4:12.0	2nd place, silver medalist(s)

Women

Athlete	Event	Heat		Semifinal		Final	
Athlete	Event	Time	Rank	Time	Rank	Time	Rank
Dawn Fraser	100 m freestyle	1:02.1	2 Q	1:01.4 OR	1 Q	1:01.2 OR	1st place, gold medalist(s)
Ilsa Konrads	100 m freestyle	1:04.2	5 Q	1:04.7	9	Did not advance	
Dawn Fraser	400 m freestyle	4:57.6	=5 Q	—N/a		4:58.5	5
Ilsa Konrads	400 m freestyle	4:59.2	7 Q	—N/a		4:57.9	4
Gergaynia Beckett	100 m backstroke	1:13.7	14	—N/a		Did not advance	
Marilyn Wilson	100 m backstroke	1:13.8	=15	—N/a		Did not advance	
Janet Hogan	200 m breaststroke	3:00.3	16	—N/a		Did not advance	
Rosemary Lassig	200 m breaststroke	2:57.4	11	—N/a		Did not advance	
Jan Andrew	100 m butterfly	1:10.3	2 Q	—N/a		1:12.2	3rd place, bronze medalist(s)
Dawn Fraser	100 m butterfly	DNS		—N/a		Did not advance	
Dawn Fraser; Ilsa Konrads; Lorraine Crapp; Alva Colquhoun; Sandra Morgan; Ruth Everuss	4 × 100 m freestyle	4:17.6	1 Q	—N/a		4:11.3	2nd place, silver medalist(s)
Jan Andrew; Dawn Fraser; Gergaynia Beckett; Ilsa Konrads	4 × 100 m medley	4:55.7	8 Q	—N/a		4:45.9	2nd place, silver medalist(s)

== Water polo ==
- Dick Thornett

== Weightlifting ==
Men's featherweight (60 kg)

- Alan Oshyer AC

Men's lightweight (67.5 kg)

- Neville Pery AC

Men's middleweight (75 kg)

- Daryl Cohen 17th
- Donald Bayley DNF

Men's middle heavyweight (90 kg)

- Manny Santos AC

Men's Heavyweight (+90 kg)

- Arthur Shannos 9th
- Cornel Wilczek (11 January 1935 – 21 October 1988) 11th
