= Swimming at the 1960 Summer Olympics – Women's 100 metre backstroke =

Women's 100 metre backstroke at the Games of the XVII Olympiad
- Venue: Stadio Olimpico del Nuoto
- Date: September 1, 1960 (heats); September 3, 1960 (final)
- Competitors: 30 from 19 nations
- Winning time: 4:50.6 OR

Medalists
1st place, gold medalist(s)		Lynn Burke	United States
2nd place, silver medalist(s)		Natalie Steward	Great Britain
3rd place, bronze medalist(s)		Satoko Tanaka	Japan

The women's 100 metre backstroke event at the 1960 Olympic Games took place between September 1 and 3. This swimming event used backstroke. Because an Olympic-size swimming pool is 50 metres long, this race consisted of two lengths of the pool.

== Results ==
=== Heats ===
Eight fastest swimmers from the heats advanced to the finals.

Heat 1

Rank	Athlete	Country	Time	Notes
1	Laura Ranwell	South Africa	1:12.0	Q
2	Nadine Delache	France	1:12.5	Q
3	Larisa Viktorova	Soviet Union	1:12.8	
4	Sara Barber	Canada	1:13.4	
5	Gergaynia Beckett	Australia	1:13.7	
6	Lynette Cooper	Rhodesia	1:15.8	
7	Anneliese Rockenbach	Venezuela	1:18.6	
8	Anna Temesvári	Hungary	1:21.5	

Heat 2

Rank	Athlete	Country	Time	Notes
1	Lynn Burke	United States	1:09.4	Q
2	Ethel Ward Petersen	Denmark	1:12.6	
3	Ingrid Schmidt	United Team of Germany	1:13.1	
4	Marilyn Wilson	Australia	1:13.8	
5	Rini Dobber	Netherlands	1:14.2	
6	Lyudmila Klipova	Soviet Union	1:14.5	
7	Doris Gontersweiler-Vetterli	Switzerland	1:19.6	
8	Simone Theis	Luxembourg	1:23.9	

Heat 3

Rank	Athlete	Country	Time	Notes
1	Ria van Velsen	Netherlands	1:11.1	Q
2	Satoko Tanaka	Japan	1:11.5	Q
3	Natalie Steward	Great Britain	1:12.0	Q
4	Helga Schmidt-Neuber	United Team of Germany	1:13.3	
5	Magda Dávid	Hungary	1:15.7	
6	Arlette Faidiga	Italy	1:18.5	
7	Anne Van Parijs	Belgium	1:20.4	

Heat 4

Rank	Athlete	Country	Time	Notes
1	Sylvia Lewis	Great Britain	1:12.2	Q
2	Rosy Piacentini	France	1:12.2	Q
3	Nina Harmer	United States	1:13.8	
4	Kirsten Michaelsen	Denmark	1:14.3	
5	Dorothy Sutcliffe	Rhodesia	1:15.2	
6	Daniela Serpilli	Italy	1:20.3	
7	Lore Trittner	Austria	1:20.8	

=== Final ===
Rank	Athlete	Country	Time	Notes
1	Lynn Burke	United States	1:09.3	OR
2	Natalie Steward	Great Britain	1:10.8	
3	Satoko Tanaka	Japan	1:11.4	
4	Laura Ranwell	South Africa	1:11.4	
5	Rosy Piacentini	France	1:11.4	
6	Sylvia Lewis	Great Britain	1:11.8	
7	Ria van Velsen	Netherlands	1:12.1	
8	Nadine Delache	France	1:12.4	

Key: OR = Olympic record
