= Swimming at the 1958 European Aquatics Championships – Women's 100 metre backstroke =

Qualification rounds of Women's 100 metre backstroke at the 1958 European Aquatics Championships were held on 2 September. The final was held the next day. There were 19 participants in the competition.

== Results ==
=== Qualifications ===
Position	Race	Name	Nationality	Result	Other
1.	3	Maria van Velsen	(Netherlands)	1:13.3	Q
2.	4	Margaret Edwards	(United Kingdom)	1:13.5	Q
3.	1	Larisa Viktorova	Soviet Union	1:14.1	Q
4.	1	Judith Grinham	(United Kingdom)	1:14.2	Q
5.	2	Lenie de Nijs	(Netherlands)	1:14.2	Q
6.	2	Rosy Piacentini	(France)	1:15.9	Q
7.	2	Helga Schmidt	(Germany)	1:16.3	Q
8.	4	Anneliese Schneider	(East Germany)	1:16.7	Q
9.	4	Katalin Takács	(Hungary)	1:16.7	
10.	4	Ethel Petersen	(Denmark)	1:17.3	
11.	3	Eszter Csohány	(Hungary)	1:18.5	
12.	1	Brigitta Segerström	(Sweden)	1:19.1	
13.	2	Arlette Faidiga	(Italy)	1:19.1	
14.	1	Eva Sperlová	(Czechoslovakia)	1:19.4	
15.	3	Ingeborg Lechman	(East Germany)	1:19.7	
16.	3	Eleonore Trittner	(Austria)	1:19.7	
17.	2	Nora Novotny	(Austria)	1:21.2	
18.	4	Natalja Bajkovic	(Socialist Federal Republic of Yugoslavia)	1:21.7	
19.	3	Joanne Sokołowska	(Poland)	1:22.4	

=== Final ===
Position	Line	Name	Nationality	Result	Other
Gold medal	2	Judith Grinham	(United Kingdom)	1:12,6	ECR
Silver medal	5	Margaret Edwards	(United Kingdom)	1:12.9	
Bronze medal	3	Larisa Viktorova	Soviet Union	1:13.9	
4.	6	Lenie de Nijs	(Netherlands)	1:14.3	
5.	4	Maria van Velsen	(Netherlands)	1:15.2	
6.	1	Helga Schmidt	(Germany)	1:15.8	
7.	7	Rosy Piacentini	(France)	1:15.9	
8.	8	Anneliese Schneider	(East Germany)	1:17.7	

== Sources ==
- IX. úszó, műugró és vízilabda Európa-bajnokság. Magyar Úszó Szövetség. 1958.
