= Bärbel Fuhrmann =

German swimmer

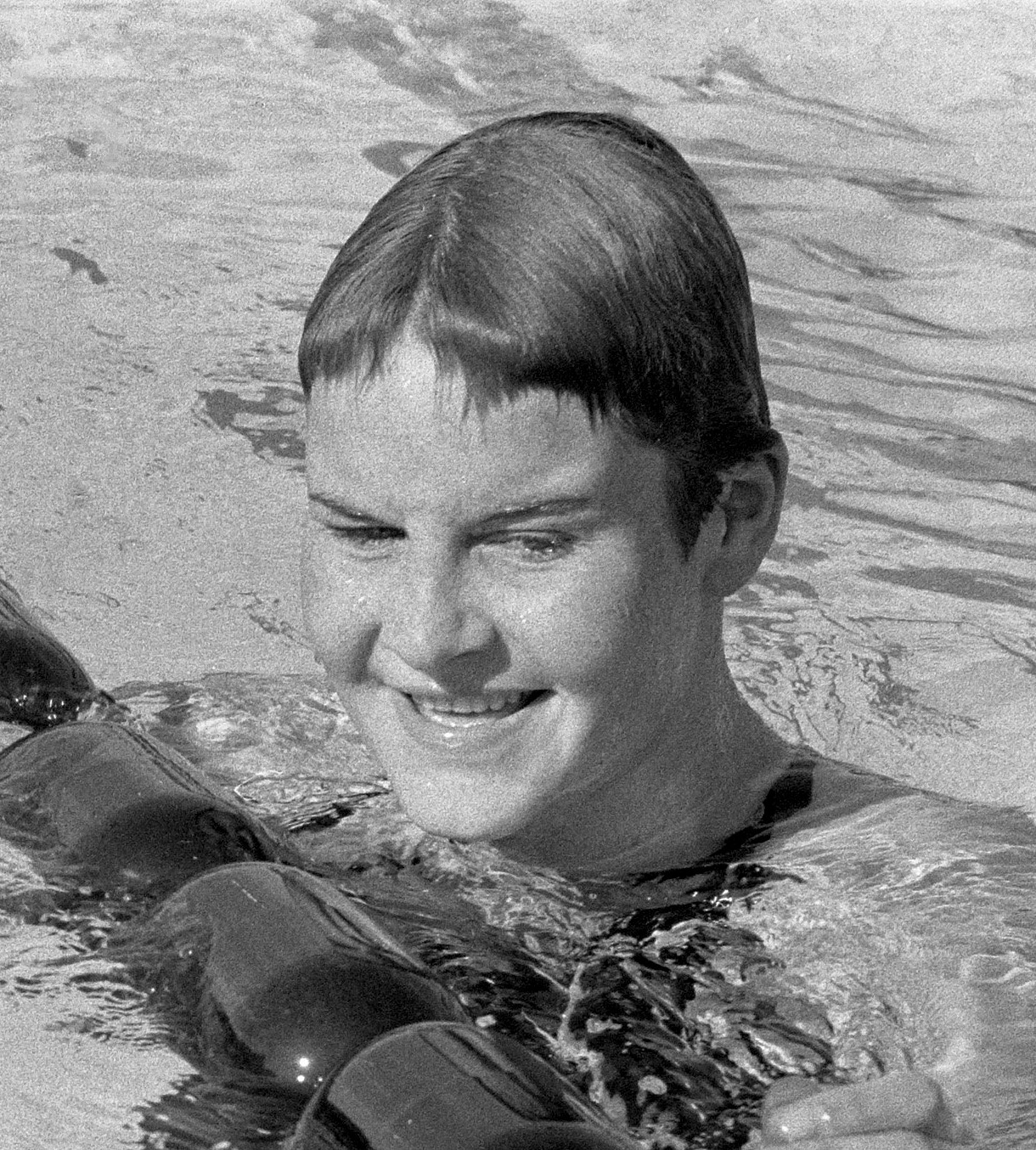
- Bärbel Fuhrmann at the 1960 Olympics

Personal information
- Nationality: Germany
- Born: 28 March 1940 (age 86) Breslau, Prussia
- Height: 1.76 m (5 ft 9 in)
- Weight: 75 kg (165 lb)

Sport
- Sport: Swimming
- Strokes: Butterfly
- Club: SC Empor Rostock
Medal record
Olympic Games
Representing Germany
Bronze medal – third place	1960 Rome	4×100 m medley relay

Bärbel Fuhrmann (after 1962 von Fircks, born 29 March 1940), is a retired German swimmer who won a bronze medal at the 1960 Summer Olympics in Rome.

She won her Olympic medal in the 4 × 100 m medley relay with her united German team mates Ingrid Schmidt, Ursula Küper and Ursel Brunner. Fuhrmann finished on the 9th place in the series of the individual 100 m butterfly event, and that was only 0.2 seconds too slow to enter the final.

Bärbel Fuhrmann/von Fircks is a five time national champion of the German Democratic Republic and she probably also won 5 silver medals and a bronze. Her medals in the 100 metre butterfly were in 1959 silver, behind Jutta Langenau, in 1960-1961-1962 gold, and in 1963-1964 silver behind Ute Noack. In 1963, the 200 metre butterfly race was added to the championships. Von Fircks won the race and Noack took second place.

From 1960 on, Bärbel's club SC Empor Rostock managed to win 4 medals in a row: in 1960 silver, 1961 bronze, 1962 gold and 1963 silver. In 1962 and 1963, Von Fircks raced with Helga Zimmermann, Rita Schumacher and another teammate called Drew. The athletes of the 1960 and 1961 Rostock relay teams are not mentioned in our sources, but butterfly champion Fuhrmann probably was one of them.

Bärbel swam 3 GDR records: On the 100 metres, in 1959 1:14.2 and in 1960 1:11.4, on the 200 metres in 1963 2:37.3.

After her swimming career, she became a teacher and deputy principal of a special school in Rostock.
