= Carolyn Schuler =

American swimmer (1943–2024)

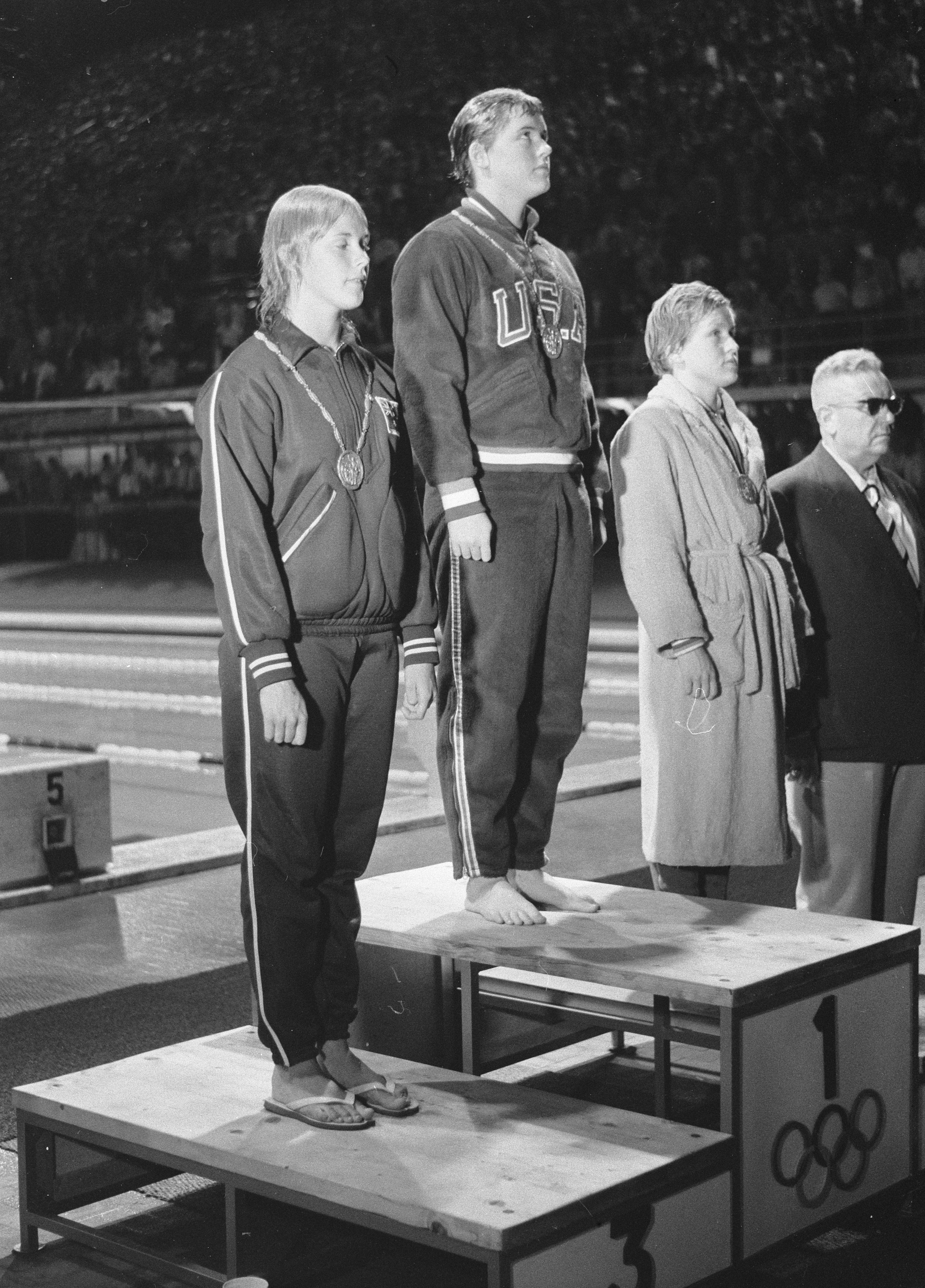
- Women's 100-meter butterfly winners at 1960 Olympics: Carolyn Schuler (1), Marianne Heemskerk (2) and Jan Andrew (3).

Personal information
- Full name: Carolyn Jane Schuler
- National team: United States
- Born: January 5, 1943 San Francisco, California, U.S.
- Died: July 22, 2024 (aged 81)
- Height: 5 ft 6 in (1.68 m)
- Weight: 139 lb (63 kg)

Sport
- Sport: Swimming
- Strokes: Butterfly
- Club: Berkeley YMCA
Medal record
Women's swimming
Representing the United States
Olympic Games
Gold medal – first place	1960 Rome	100 m butterfly
Gold medal – first place	1960 Rome	4x100 m medley relay

Carolyn Jane Schuler (January 5, 1943 – July 22, 2024), also known by her married name Carolyn Schuler Jones, was an American competition swimmer, a 1960 Rome Olympic gold medalist in both the 100-meter butterfly and the 4x100-meter medley, and a one-time world record-holder.

Schuler began swimming competitively at the age of 13 and was not recognized in her youth as an outstanding competitor. During most of her competitive career prior to the Olympics, she had rarely won an individual National championship. At a high point in her early career, she was a member of an AAU National Championship team for the Berkeley YMCA, that captured the national AAU medley championship with only a five member team. Showing dominance, they established a new American record for the medley relay at nationals, though Schuler still would hold few if any individual championships in her early career.

Swimming for the Berkeley YMCA in the National Jr. Girls championship, Schuler was part of a medley relay team consisting of Sylvia Ruuska, Mary Lou Elsenius, and Patricia Ruuska that won the 4x100-yard medley relay event in 4:44.8 at the Fresno State College Pool on March 8, 1958. A Berkeley Y team including Schuler, Sylvia and Patricia Ruuska and Ann Bancroft set the National record in the 440-yard freestyle relay with a 4:29.0 in July, 1959, breaking the record of 4:36 set in 1957 by the Los Angeles Athletic Club.

At the Far Western Swim Meet in San Francisco, in late August, 1959, she set a world record of 2:38.1 in the 200-meter butterfly, gaining national attention, and beginning speculation about a possible place on the Olympic team the following year.

== 1960 Rome Olympics ==
In the 1960 Olympic qualifying heats, Schuler swam a 1:09.8 in her qualifying heat for the 100-meter breaststroke an outstanding time that qualified her for the Olympic finals.

Schuler represented the United States as a 17-year-old at the 1960 Summer Olympics in Rome, where she won two gold medals. She received her first gold medal for winning the women's 100-meter butterfly, with a new Olympic record time of 1:09.5. Nancy Ramey was the favorite prior to the Olympics, but did not make the U.S. team. Schuler had an easy win, with a .9 second lead over the Dutch swimmer Marianne Heemskerk who took the gold and Australia’s Jan Andrew, who captured the silver. America's Carolyn Wood, at only 14, was in the lead in the event final at the 70 meter point, but swallowed water and had to stop, removing herself from the competition.

Schuler earned a second gold medal as a member of the first-place United States team in the women's 4×100-meter medley relay, together with teammates Lynn Burke (backstroke), Patty Kempner (breaststroke), and Chris von Saltza (freestyle). The winning U.S. medley relay set a new world record of 4:41.1 in the event final. Schuler's time for her 100 breaststroke leg was 1:08.9, a personal best time.

In her career, she eventually won 3 AAU National Championships in relay events, and held four American records, which included the 100-meter butterfly, and several relays.

Her best event, with the fastest recorded times was the 200 butterfly, but it was not part of Women's Olympic competition until the 1968 Mexico City Games, after Schuler had retired from competitive swimming.

== Honors ==
Schuler was inducted into the International Swimming Hall of Fame as an "Honor Swimmer" in 1989.

As Carolyn Schuler Jones, she died on July 22, 2024, at the age of 81. She lived for much of her life in Mission Viejo, California. In 1965, she graduated with a degree in elementary education from the University of Pacific.

== See also ==
- List of members of the International Swimming Hall of Fame
- List of Olympic medalists in swimming (women)
- World record progression 4 × 100 metres medley relay
