= Ranwell =

Ranwell is a surname. Notable people with the name include:

- Laura Ranwell (born 1941), South African swimmer
- William Ranwell (1797–1861), English landscape artist
- Jon Ranwell (born 1966), English actor
