= Van Parijs =

Van Parijs is a Dutch surname. Notable people with the surname include:

- Anne Van Parijs (born 1944), Belgian swimmer
- Luk Van Parijs (born 1970), American biologist
- Philippe Van Parijs (born 1951), Belgian philosopher and political economist
