= Swimming at the 1960 Summer Olympics – Women's 100 metre butterfly =

Women's 100 metre butterfly at the Games of the XVII Olympiad
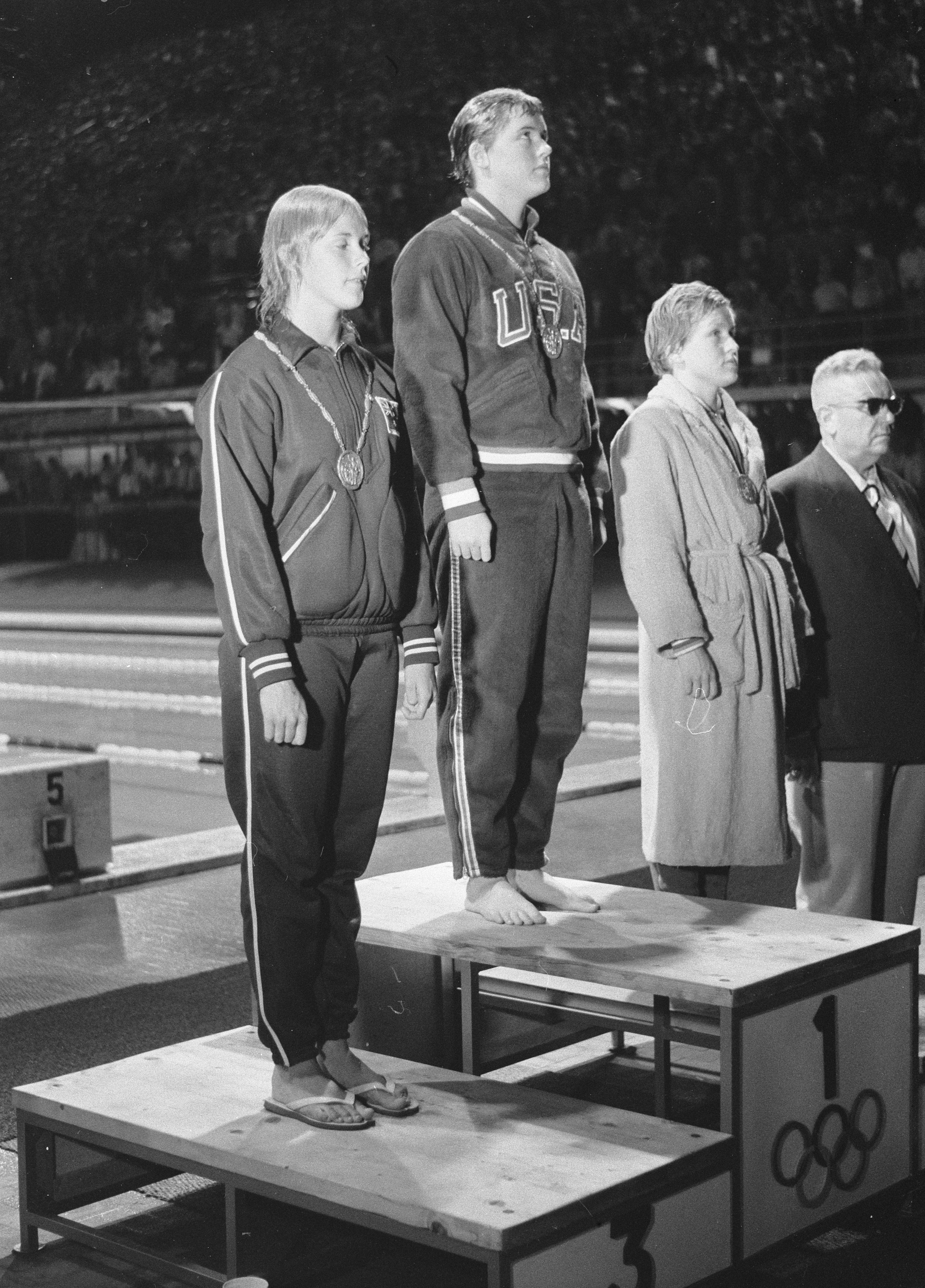
- Left-Right: Marianne Heemskerk, Carolyn Schuler, and Jan Andrew
- Venue: Stadio Olimpico del Nuoto
- Date: 29 August 1960 (heats); 30 August 1960 (final)
- Competitors: 25 from 16 nations
- Winning time: 1:09.5 OR

Medalists
1st place, gold medalist(s)		Carolyn Schuler	United States
2nd place, silver medalist(s)		Marianne Heemskerk	Netherlands
3rd place, bronze medalist(s)		Jan Andrew	Australia

The women's 100 metre butterfly event at the 1960 Olympic Games took place on August 29 and August 30. This swimming event used the butterfly stroke. Because an Olympic size swimming pool is 50 metres long, this race consisted of two lengths of the pool.

== Results ==
=== Heats ===
Eight fastest swimmers advanced directly to the finals

Heat 1

Rank	Athlete	Country	Time	Note
1	Carolyn Schuler	United States	1:09.8	
2	Jan Andrew	Australia	1:10.3	
3	Valentina Poznyak	Soviet Union	1:13.2	
4	Jean Oldroyd	Great Britain	1:14.2	
5	Silvia Belmar	Mexico	1:16.5	
6	Hannelore Janele	Austria	1:18.4	
	Judith McHale	Canada	DNS	

Heat 2

Rank	Athlete	Country	Time	Note
1	Sheila Watt	Great Britain	1:12.3	
2	Zinaida Belovetskaya	Soviet Union	1:12.6	
3	Kristina Larsson	Sweden	1:13.0	
4	Anna Beneck	Italy	1:18.4	
5	Hillary Wilson	Rhodesia	1:21.4	
	Dawn Fraser	Australia	DNS	
	Gertrudes Lozada	Philippines	DNS	

Heat 3

Rank	Athlete	Country	Time	Note
1	Carolyn Wood	United States	1:11.1	
2	Atie Voorbij	Netherlands	1:12.4	
3	Heidi Eisenschmidt	United Team of Germany	1:14.6	
4	Karin Larsson	Sweden	1:15.0	
5	Eulalia Martínez	Mexico	1:17.9	
6	Márta Egerváry	Hungary	1:19.4	
7	Colette Libourel	France	1:20.4	

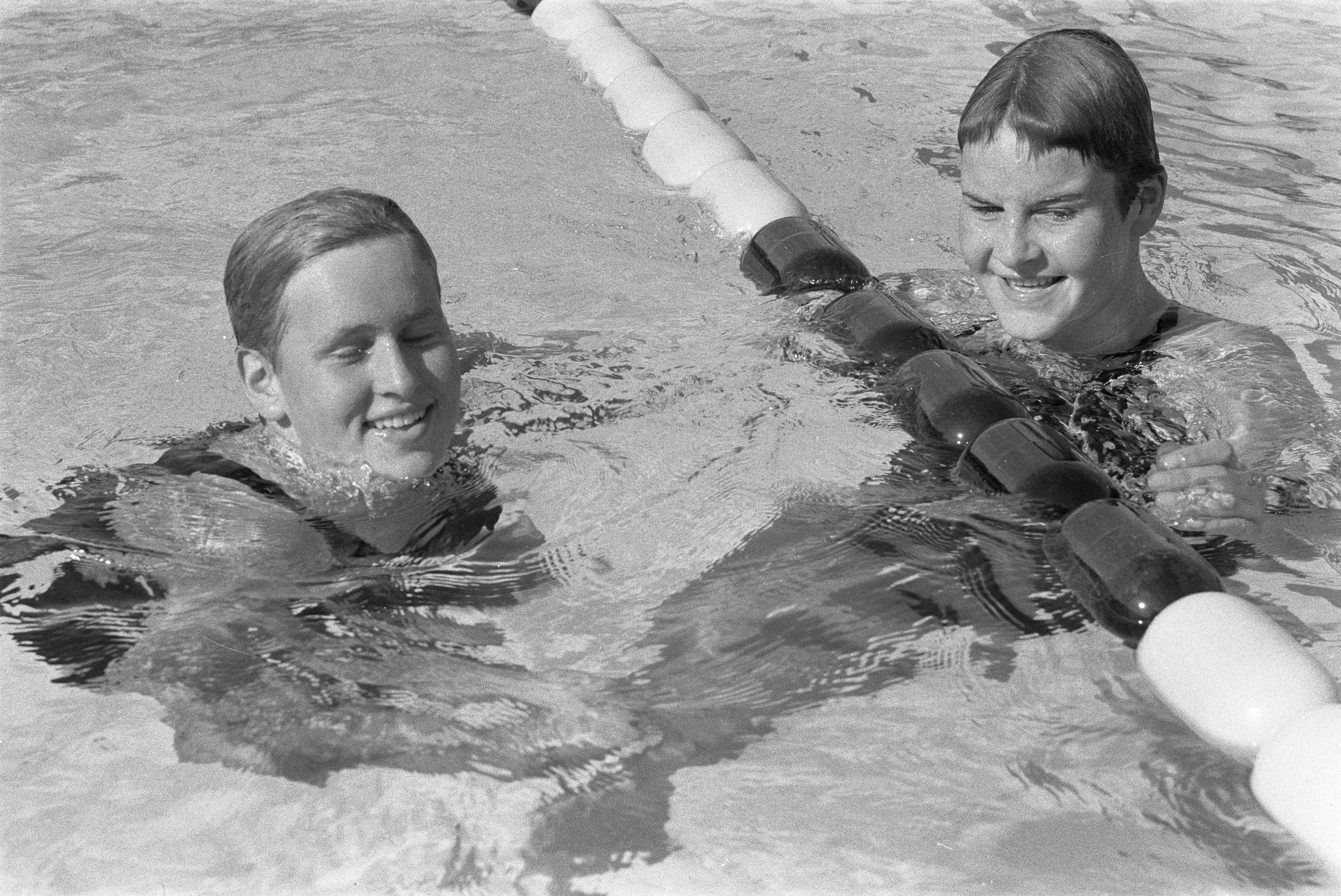
Heemskerk and Fuhrmann after heat 4

Heat 4

Rank	Athlete	Country	Time	Note
1	Marianne Heemskerk	Netherlands	1:11.0	
2	Bärbel Fuhrmann	United Team of Germany	1:13.2	
3	Margaret Iwasaki	Canada	1:14.2	
4	Shizue Miyabe	Japan	1:15.8	
5	Sandra von Giese	Philippines	1:16.3	
6	Annie Caron	France	1:17.1	
7	Anna Cechi	Italy	1:19.5	

=== Final ===
Rank	Athlete	Country	Time	Notes
1	Carolyn Schuler	United States	1:09.5	OR
2	Marianne Heemskerk	Netherlands	1:10.4	
3	Jan Andrew	Australia	1:12.2	
4	Sheila Watt	Great Britain	1:13.3	
5	Atie Voorbij	Netherlands	1:13.3	
6	Zinaida Belovetskaya	Soviet Union	1:13.3	
7	Kristina Larsson	Sweden	1:13.6	
	Carolyn Wood	United States	DNF	

Wood was in second place after 70 metres, but swallowed too much water, became confused, and stopped swimming.

Key: DNF = Did not finish, OR = Olympic record
