= Grindal (surname) =

Grindal is a surname. Notable people with the surname include:

- Alan Grindal (born 1940), Australian former Olympic cyclist
- Edmund Grindal (c. 1519–1583), Bishop of London, Archbishop of York, and Archbishop of Canterbury
- James Grindal (born 1980), English former rugby union footballer

== See also ==
- Grindal Island, South Australia
- Enchytraeus buchholzi, also known as Grindal worms
