= 200 metres backstroke =

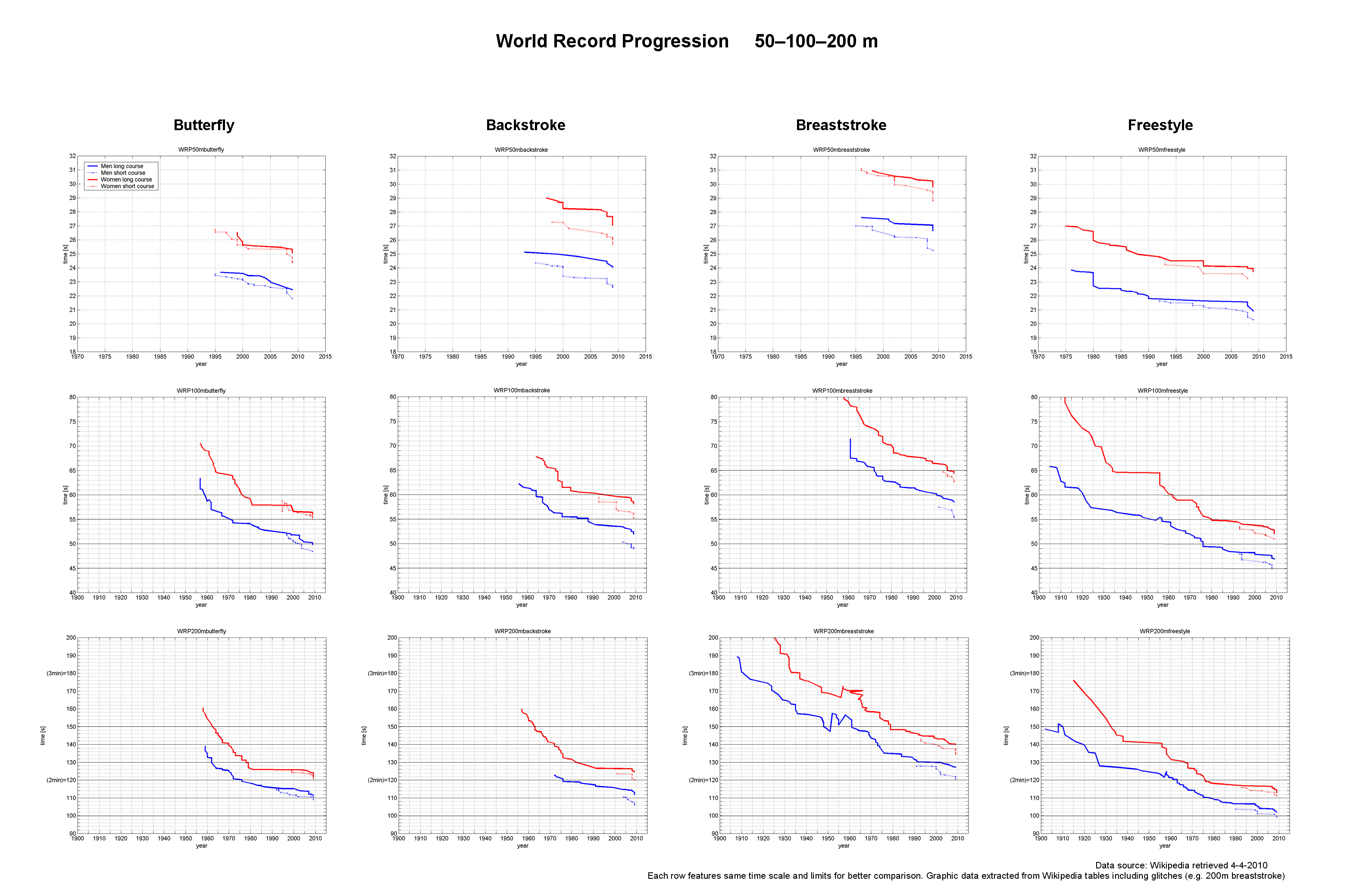
Graphs of the progression of the World Records in all four strokes (50 m, 100 m and 200 m distances) until 2010.

The 200 metres backstroke is an event in competitive swimming. World records are ratified by World Aquatics (formerly FINA). The current long course world record holders are the US' Aaron Peirsol and Australia's Kaylee McKeown, while the current short course world record holders are Hungary's Hubert Kós, and McKeown.

The men's event was first contested at the Olympic Games in 1900; it was removed from the 1904 program and was reinstated at the 1964 games. The women's event has been contested since 1968. The current Olympic champions are Kós and McKeown. The men's and women's events have been contested at the World Aquatics Championships since the inaugural championships in 1973; the current world champions (long course) are Kós and McKeown. The men's and women's events have been contested at the World Aquatics Swimming Championships (25m) since the inaugural championships in 1993; the current world champions (short course) are Kós, and the US' Regan Smith.

== World record progression ==
=== Men long course ===
==== Old regulations ====
No	Time	Name	Nationality	Date	Location
1	3'04"4	Oscar Schiele	Germany	27 June 1909	Berlin, Germany
2	2'59"8	George Arnold	Germany	3 January 1910	Magdeburg, Germany
3	2'56"4	Maurice Wechesser	Belgium	18 October 1910	Schaerbeek, Belgium
4	2'50"6	Hermann Pentz	Germany	11 March 1911	Magdeburg, Germany
5	2'48"4	Otto Fahr	Germany	3 April 1912	Magdeburg, Germany
6	2'47"1	Walter Laufer	United States	24 June 1926	Bremen, Germany
7	2'44"9	Walter Laufer	United States	11 July 1926	Nuremberg, Germany
8	2'38"8	Walter Laufer	United States	13 July 1926	Magdeburg, Germany
9	2'37"8	Toshio Irie	Japan	14 October 1928	Tamagawa, Japan
10	2'32"2	George Kojac	United States	16 June 1930	New Haven, United States
11	2'27"8	Al Vande Weghe	United States	30 August 1934	Honolulu, Hawaii
12	2'24"0	Adolph Kiefer	United States	11 April 1935	Chicago, United States
13	2'23"0	Adolph Kiefer	United States	23 May 1941	Honolulu, Hawaii
14	2'22"9	Harry Holiday	United States	18 May 1943	Detroit, United States
15	2'19"3	Adolph Kiefer	United States	4 March 1944	Annapolis, United States
16	2'18"5	Allen Stack	United States	4 May 1949	New Haven, United States
17	2'18"3	Gilbert Bozon	France	26 June 1953	Algiers, Algeria

==== New regulations ====
#	Time		Name	Nationality	Date	Meet	Location	Ref
01	2:18.5		Allen Stack	United States	4 May 1949	-	New Haven, United States	
02	2:18.3		Gilbert Bozon	France	26 June 1953	-	Algiers, Algeria	
03	2:18.8		John Monckton	Australia	15 January 1958	-	Sydney, Australia	
04	2:18.4		John Monckton	Australia	18 February 1958	-	Melbourne, Australia	
05	2:17.9		Frank McKinney	United States	12 July 1959	-	Los Altos, United States	
06	2:17.8		Frank McKinney	United States	25 July 1959	-	Osaka, Japan	
07	2:17.6		Chuck Bittick	United States	26 June 1960	-	Los Angeles, United States	
08	2:16.0		Tom Stock	United States	24 July 1960	-	Toledo, United States	
09	2:13.2		Tom Stock	United States	2 July 1961	-	Chicago, United States	
10	2:11.5		Tom Stock	United States	20 August 1961	-	Los Angeles, United States	
11	2:10.9		Tom Stock	United States	10 August 1962	-	Cuyahoga Falls, United States	
12	2:10.3		Jed Graef	United States	13 October 1964	1964 Summer Olympics	Tokyo, Japan	
13	2:09.4		Charles Hickcox	United States	29 August 1967	1967 Summer Universiade	Tokyo, Japan	
14	2:07.9		Roland Matthes	East Germany	8 November 1967	-	Leipzig, East Germany	
15	2:07.5		Roland Matthes	East Germany	14 August 1968	GDR Olympic Trials	Leipzig, East Germany	
16	2:07.4		Roland Matthes	East Germany	12 July 1969	Santa Clara Invitational	Santa Clara, United States	
17	2:06.6		Gary Hall	United States	14 August 1969	AAU Nationals	Louisville, United States	
17	2:06.6	=	Roland Matthes	East Germany	29 August 1969	-	Berlin, West Germany	
18	2:06.3		Mike Stamm	United States	20 August 1970	AAU Nationals	Los Angeles, United States	
19	2:06.1		Roland Matthes	East Germany	11 September 1970	European Championships	Barcelona, Spain	
20	2:05.6		Roland Matthes	East Germany	3 September 1971	GDR vs USA Duel	Leipzig, East Germany	
21	2:02.8		Roland Matthes	East Germany	10 July 1972	GDR Olympic Trials	Leipzig, East Germany	
21	2:02.82	=	Roland Matthes	East Germany	2 September 1972	1972 Summer Olympics	Munich, West Germany	
22	2:01.87		Roland Matthes	East Germany	6 September 1973	World Championships	Belgrade, Yugoslavia	
23	2:00.64		John Naber	United States	19 June 1976	USA Olympic Trials	Long Beach, United States	
24	1:59.19		John Naber	United States	24 July 1976	1976 Summer Olympics	Montreal, Canada	
25	1:58.93		Rick Carey	United States	3 August 1983	1983 U.S. Summer Nationals	Clovis, United States	
26	1:58.86		Rick Carey	United States	27 June 1984	1984 U.S. Olympic Trials	Indianapolis, United States	
27	1:58.41		Sergei Zabolotnov	Soviet Union	21 August 1984	Friendship Games	Moscow, Soviet Union	
28	1:58.14		Igor Polyansky	Soviet Union	3 March 1985	GDR vs URS Duel	Erfurt, East Germany	
29	1:57.30		Martin Zubero	Spain	13 August 1991	1991 U.S. Summer Nationals	Fort Lauderdale, United States	
30	1:56.57		Martin Zubero	Spain	23 November 1991	Alabama LC Invitational	Tuscaloosa, United States	
31	1:55.87		Lenny Krayzelburg	United States	27 August 1999	Pan Pacific Championships	Sydney, Australia	
32	1:55.15		Aaron Peirsol	United States	20 March 2002	US Spring National Championships	Minneapolis, United States	
33	1:54.74		Aaron Peirsol	United States	12 July 2004	US Olympic Trials	Long Beach, United States	
34	1:54.66		Aaron Peirsol	United States	29 July 2005	World Championships	Montreal, Canada	
35	1:54.44		Aaron Peirsol	United States	19 August 2006	Pan Pacific Championships	Victoria, Canada	
36	1:54.32		Ryan Lochte	United States	30 March 2007	World Championships	Melbourne, Australia	
36	1:54.32	=	Aaron Peirsol	United States	4 July 2008	US Olympic Trials	Omaha, United States	
37	1:53.94		Ryan Lochte	United States	15 August 2008	Olympic Games	Beijing, China	
-	1:52.86		Ryosuke Irie	Japan	10 May 2009	Duel in the Pool: Australia vs Japan	Canberra, Australia	
38	1:53.08		Aaron Peirsol	United States	11 July 2009	US National Championships	Indianapolis, United States	
39	1:51.92		Aaron Peirsol	United States	31 July 2009	World Championships	Rome, Italy	

Legend: # – Record awaiting ratification by FINA; e – equalled existing record;
Records not set in finals: h – heat; sf – semifinal; r – relay 1st leg; rh – relay heat 1st leg; b – B final; † – en route to final mark; so – swim-off; tt – time trial

=== Men short course ===
#	Time		Name	Nationality	Date	Meet	Location	Ref
WB	1:55.93		Mark Tewksbury	Canada	1 March 1991	World Cup	Toronto, Canada	
1	1:52.51		Martin Lopez-Zubero	Spain	10 April 1991	?	Gainesville, United States	
2	1:52.47		Lenny Krayzelburg	United States	18 November 1999	World Cup	College Park, United States	
3	1:52.43		Lenny Krayzelburg	United States	6 February 2000	World Cup	Berlin, Germany	
4	1:51.62		Matt Welsh	Australia	13 October 2000	?	Melbourne, Australia	
4	1:51.62	=	Gordan Kožulj	Croatia	21 January 2001	World Cup	Berlin, Germany	
6	1:51.17		Aaron Peirsol	United States	7 April 2002	World Championships	Moscow, Russia	
7	1:50.52		Aaron Peirsol	United States	11 October 2004	World Championships	Indianapolis, United States	
8	1:50.43		Markus Rogan	Austria	8 December 2005	European Championships	Trieste, Italy	
9	1:49.05		Ryan Lochte	United States	9 April 2006	World Championships	Shanghai, China	
10	1:47.84		Markus Rogan	Austria	13 April 2008	World Championships	Manchester, United Kingdom	
11	1:47.08		George Du Rand	South Africa	7 November 2009	World Cup	Moscow, Russia	
12	1:46.11		Arkady Vyatchanin	Russia	15 November 2009	World Cup	Berlin, Germany	
13	1:45.63		Mitch Larkin	Australia	27 November 2015	Australian Championships	Sydney, Australia	
14	1:45.12		Hubert Kós	Hungary	23 October 2025	World Cup	Toronto, Canada	

Legend: # – Record awaiting ratification by FINA; e – equalled existing record;
Records not set in finals: h – heat; sf – semifinal; r – relay 1st leg; rh – relay heat 1st leg; b – B final; † – en route to final mark; so – swim-off; tt – time trial

=== Women long course ===
==== Old Regulations ====
No	Time	Name	Nationality	Date	Location
1	3'06"8	Sybil Bauer	United States	4 July 1922	Brighton Beach, United States
2	3'03"8	Sybil Bauer	United States	9 February 1924	Miami, United States
3	2'59"2	Marie Braun	Netherlands	24 November 1928	Brussels, Belgium
4	2'58"8	Eleanor Holm	United States	1 February 1930	Buffalo, United States
5	2'58"2	Eleanor Holm	United States	1 March 1930	New York City, United States
6	2'50"4	Phyllis Harding	United Kingdom	19 September 1932	Wallasey, United Kingdom
7	2'49"6	Rie Mastenbroek	Netherlands	20 January 1935	Amsterdam, Netherlands
8	2'48"7	Eleanor Holm	United States	3 March 1936	Toledo, United States
9	2'44"6	Nida Senff	Netherlands	2 February 1937	Amsterdam, Netherlands
10	2'41"3	Ragnhild Hveger	Denmark	14 February 1937	Århus, Denmark
11	2'41"0	Cor Kint	Netherlands	17 April 1938	Århus, Denmark
12	2'40"6	Iet van Feggelen	Netherlands	26 October 1938	Düsseldorf, Germany
13	2'39"0	Iet van Feggelen	Netherlands	18 December 1938	Amsterdam, Netherlands
14	2'38"8	Cor Kint	Netherlands	29 November 1939	Rotterdam, Netherlands
15	2'35"3	Geertje Wielema	Netherlands	2 April 1950	Hilversum, Netherlands

==== New Regulations ====
#	Time		Name	Nationality	Date	Meet	Location	Ref
1	2:39.9		Philippa Gould	New Zealand	16 Jan 1957	?	Auckland, New Zealand	
2	2:38.5		Lenie de Nijs	Netherlands	17 May 1957	?	Blackpool, United Kingdom	
3	2:37.4		Chris von Saltza	United States	1 Aug 1958	?	Topeka, United States	
4	2:37.1		Satoko Tanaka	Japan	12 Jul 1959	?	Tokyo, Japan	
5	2:34.8		Satoko Tanaka	Japan	2 Apr 1960	?	Tokyo, Japan	
6	2:33.5		Lynn Burke	United States	15 Jul 1960	?	Indianapolis, United States	
7	2:33.3		Satoko Tanaka	Japan	23 Jul 1960	?	Tokyo, Japan	
8	2:33.2		Satoko Tanaka	Japan	30 Jul 1961	?	Tokyo, Japan	
9	2:32.1		Satoko Tanaka	Japan	3 Jun 1962	?	Beppu, Japan	
10	2:31.6		Satoko Tanaka	Japan	29 Jul 1962	?	Osaka, Japan	
11	2:29.6		Satoko Tanaka	Japan	10 Feb 1963	?	Sydney, Australia	
12	2:28.9		Satoko Tanaka	Japan	18 Feb 1963	?	Perth, Australia	
13	2:28.5		Satoko Tanaka	Japan	21 Feb 1963	?	Perth, Australia	
14	2:28.2		Satoko Tanaka	Japan	4 Aug 1963	?	Tokyo, Japan	
15	2:27.4		Cathy Ferguson	United States	28 Sep 1964	?	Los Angeles, United States	
16	2:27.1		Karen Muir	South Africa	25 Jul 1966	?	Béziers, France	
17	2:26.4		Karen Muir	South Africa	18 Aug 1966	?	Lincoln, United States	
18	2:24.4		Elaine Tanner	Canada	26 Jul 1967	Pan American Games	Winnipeg, Canada	
19	2:24.1		Karen Muir	South Africa	6 Jan 1968	?	Kimberley, South Africa	
20	2:23.8		Karen Muir	South Africa	21 Jul 1968	?	Los Angeles, United States	
21	2:21.5		Susie Atwood	United States	14 Aug 1969	AAU Nationals	Louisville, United States	
22	2:20.64		Melissa Belote	United States	5 Aug 1972	USA Olympic Trials	Chicago, United States	
23	2:20.58		Melissa Belote	United States	4 Sep 1972	Olympic Games	Munich, West Germany	
24	2:19.19		Melissa Belote	United States	4 Sep 1972	Olympic Games	Munich, West Germany	
25	2:18.41		Ulrike Richter	East Germany	7 Jul 1974	GDR Nationals/ECTs	Rostock, East Germany	
26	2:17.35		Ulrike Richter	East Germany	25 Aug 1974	European Championships	Vienna, Austria	
27	2:16.33		Nancy Garapick	Canada	27 Apr 1975	Eastern Championships	Brantford, Canada	
28	2:16.10		Birgit Treiber	East Germany	6 Jun 1975	GDR Nationals/WCTs	Wittenberg, East Germany	
29	2:15.46		Birgit Treiber	East Germany	27 Jul 1975	World Championships	Cali, Colombia	
30	2:14.41		Antje Stille	East Germany	29 Feb 1976	GDR Winter Nationals	East Berlin, East Germany	
31	2:13.50		Antje Stille	East Germany	13 Mar 1976	URS vs GDR Duel	Tallinn, Soviet Union	
32	2:12.47		Birgit Treiber	East Germany	4 Jun 1976	GDR Olympic Trials	East Berlin, East Germany	
33	2:11.93		Linda Jezek	United States	28 Aug 1978	World Championships	West Berlin, West Germany	
34	2:11.77		Rica Reinisch	East Germany	27 Jul 1980	Olympic Games	Moscow, Soviet Union	
35	2:09.91		Cornelia Sirch	East Germany	8 Aug 1982	World Championships	Guayaquil, Ecuador	
36	2:08.60		Betsy Mitchell	United States	27 June 1986	U.S. Swimming World Championship Trials	Orlando, United States	
37	2:06.62		Krisztina Egerszegi	Hungary	25 August 1991	European Championships	Athens, Greece	
38	2:06.39		Kirsty Coventry	Zimbabwe	16 February 2008	US Grand Prix	Columbia, United States	
39	2:06.09		Margaret Hoelzer	United States	5 July 2008	US Olympic Trials	Omaha, United States	
40	2:05.24		Kirsty Coventry	Zimbabwe	16 August 2008	Olympic Games	Beijing, China	
41	2:04.81		Kirsty Coventry	Zimbabwe	1 August 2009	World Championships	Rome, Italy	
42	2:04.06		Missy Franklin	United States	3 August 2012	Olympic Games	London, Great Britain	
43	2:03.35	sf	Regan Smith	United States	26 July 2019	World Championships	Gwangju, South Korea	
44	2:03.14		Kaylee McKeown	Australia	10 March 2023	NSW State Championships	Sydney, Australia	

Legend: # – Record awaiting ratification by FINA; e – equalled existing record;
Records not set in finals: h – heat; sf – semifinal; r – relay 1st leg; rh – relay heat 1st leg; b – B final; † – en route to final mark; so – swim-off; tt – time trial

=== Women short course ===
#	Time	Name	Nationality	Date	Meet	Location	Ref
1	2:07.11	Anna Simcic	New Zealand	1 February 1992	World Cup	Paris, France	
2	2:06.09	He Cihong	China	5 December 1993	World Championships	Palma de Mallorca, Spain	
3	2:05.83	Clementine Stoney	Australia	4 August 2001	Australian Championships	Perth, Australia	
4	2:04.44	Sarah Price	Great Britain	5 August 2001	Australian Championships	Perth, Australia	
5	2:03.62	Natalie Coughlin	United States	27 November 2001	World Cup	East Meadow, United States	
6	2:03.24	Reiko Nakamura	Japan	23 February 2008	Japan Open	Tokyo, Japan	
7	2:00.91	Kirsty Coventry	Zimbabwe	11 April 2008	World Championships	Manchester, United Kingdom	
8	2:00.18	Shiho Sakai	Japan	14 November 2009	World Cup	Berlin, Germany	
9	2:00.03	Missy Franklin	United States	22 October 2011	World Cup	Berlin, Germany	
10	1:59.23	Katinka Hosszú	Hungary	5 December 2014	World Championships	Doha, Qatar	
11	1:58.94	Kaylee McKeown	Australia	28 November 2020	Australian Championships	Brisbane, Australia	
12	1:58.83	Regan Smith	United States	2 November 2024	World Cup	Singapore	
13	1:58.04	Regan Smith	United States	15 December 2024	World Championships	Budapest, Hungary	
14	1:57.87	Kaylee McKeown	Australia	19 October 2025	World Cup	Westmont, United States	
15	1:57.33	Kaylee McKeown	Australia	25 October 2025	World Cup	Toronto, Canada	

Legend: # – Record awaiting ratification by FINA; e – equalled existing record;
Records not set in finals: h – heat; sf – semifinal; r – relay 1st leg; rh – relay heat 1st leg; b – B final; † – en route to final mark; so – swim-off; tt – time trial

== All-time top 25 ==
Tables show data for two definitions of "Top 25" - the top 25 200 m backstroke times and the top 25 athletes:
- denotes top performance for athletes in the top 25 200 m backstroke times
- denotes lesser performances, still in the top 25 200 m backstroke times, by repeat athletes
- denotes top performance (only) for other top 25 athletes who fall outside the top 25 200 m backstroke times

=== Men long course ===
- Correct as of August 2026

Ath.#	Perf.#	Time	Athlete	Nation	Date	Place	Ref.
1	1	1:51.92	Aaron Peirsol	United States	31 July 2009	Rome	
2	2	1:52.30	Hubert Kós	Hungary	11 August 2026	Paris	
3	3	1:52.51	Ryosuke Irie	Japan	31 July 2009	Rome	
	4	1:52.86	Irie #2		10 May 2009	Canberra	
4	5	1:52.96	Ryan Lochte	United States	29 July 2011	Shanghai	
	6	1:53.08	Peirsol #2		11 July 2009	Indianapolis	
	6	1:53.08	Kós #2		12 August 2026	Paris	
5	8	1:53.17	Mitch Larkin	Australia	7 November 2015	Dubai	
	9	1:53.19	Kós #3		1 August 2025	Singapore	
6	10	1:53.23	Evgeny Rylov	Russia	8 April 2021	Kazan	
	11	1:53.26	Irie #3		25 September 2014	Incheon	
	12	1:53.27	Rylov #2		30 July 2021	Tokyo	
	13	1:53.34	Larkin #2		29 October 2015	Tokyo	
	14	1:53.36	Rylov #3		8 August 2018	Glasgow	
7	14	1:53.36	Pieter Coetze	South Africa	1 August 2025	Singapore	
	16	1:53.40	Rylov #4		26 July 2019	Gwangju	
8	17	1:53.41	Tyler Clary	United States	2 August 2012	London	
9	18	1:53.57	Ryan Murphy	United States	12 August 2018	Tokyo	
	19	1:53.58	Larkin #3		7 August 2015	Kazan	
	20	1:53.61	Rylov #5		28 July 2017	Budapest	
	21	1:53.62	Murphy #2		11 August 2016	Rio de Janeiro	
	22	1:53.71	Rylov #6		25 April 2018	Moscow	
	23	1:53.72	Larkin #4		15 December 2015	Brisbane	
	24	1:53.73	Irie #4		7 December 2009	Hong Kong	
	25	1:53.78	Irie #5		2 August 2012	London	
10		1:53.81	Apostolos Siskos	Greece	12 August 2026	Paris	
11		1:53.96	Thomas Ceccon	Italy	12 August 2026	Paris	
12		1:53.99	Xu Jiayu	China	23 August 2018	Jakarta	
13		1:54.07	Roman Mityukov	Switzerland	12 August 2026	Paris	
14		1:54.23	Kosuke Hagino	Japan	10 April 2014	Tokyo	
15		1:54.24	Radosław Kawęcki	Poland	2 August 2013	Barcelona	
16		1:54.25	Jack Aikins	United States	4 June 2025	Indianapolis	
17		1:54.40	Jan Cejka	Czech Republic	11 August 2026	Paris	
18		1:54.43	Luke Greenbank	Great Britain	21 May 2021	Budapest	
19		1:54.47	Yohann Ndoye Brouard	France	31 July 2025	Singapore	
20		1:54.51	Hugo González	Spain	20 June 2024	Palma	
21		1:54.59	Nick Thoman	United States	5 August 2009	Federal Way	
22		1:54.61	Keaton Jones	United States	20 June 2024	Indianapolis	
23		1:54.65	Michael Phelps	United States	31 July 2007	Indianapolis	
24		1:54.75	Arkady Vyatchanin	Russia	31 July 2009	Rome	
25		1:54.77	Jacob Pebley	United States	1 July 2016	Omaha	

=== Men short course ===
- Correct as of November 2026

Ath.#	Perf.#	Time	Athlete	Nation	Date	Place	Ref.
1	1	1:45.12	Hubert Kós	Hungary	23 October 2025	Toronto	
2	2	1:45.63	Mitch Larkin	Australia	27 November 2015	Sydney	
	3	1:45.65	Kós #2		15 December 2024	Budapest	
3	4	1:46.11	Arkady Vyatchanin	Russia	15 November 2009	Berlin	
4	5	1:46.37	Evgeny Rylov	Russia	21 November 2020	Budapest	
	6	1:46.41	Vyatchanin #2		22 November 2009	Singapore	
5	7	1:46.68	Ryan Lochte	United States	19 December 2010	Dubai	
	8	1:46.84	Kós #3		10 October 2025	Carmel	
	9	1:47.02	Rylov #2		16 December 2018	Hangzhou	
6	10	1:47.08	George Du Rand	South Africa	7 November 2009	Moscow	
7	11	1:47.34	Ryan Murphy	United States	16 December 2018	Hangzhou	
8	12	1:47.38	Radosław Kawęcki	Poland	7 December 2014	Doha	
	13	1:47.41	Larkin #2		4 November 2016	Brisbane	
	13	1:47.41	Murphy #2		21 November 2020	Budapest	
	13	1:47.41	Murphy #3		18 December 2022	Melbourne	
	16	1:47.48	Murphy #4		15 November 2020	Budapest	
9	17	1:47.49	Thomas Ceccon	Italy	23 October 2025	Toronto	
	18	1:47.51	Kós #4		17 October 2025	Westmont	
	19	1:47.63	Kawęcki #2		11 August 2013	Berlin	
	19	1:47.63	Kawęcki #3		11 December 2016	Windsor	
10	21	1:47.64	Markus Rogan	Austria	11 November 2009	Stockholm	
	22	1:47.66	Vyatchanin #3		11 November 2009	Stockholm	
11	23	1:47.68	Léon Marchand	France	10 October 2025	Carmel	
	24	1:47.72	Larkin #3		9 November 2014	Adelaide	
12	25	1:47.75	Gabriel Jett	United States	29 October 2026	Westmont	
13		1:47.84	Hugo González	Spain	14 November 2026	Sabadell	
14		1:47.89	John Shortt	Ireland	3 December 2025	Lublin	
15		1:47.94	Destin Lasco	United States	29 October 2026	Westmont	
16		1:48.01	Shaine Casas	United States	18 December 2022	Melbourne	
17		1:48.02	Kliment Kolesnikov	Russia	13 December 2017	Copenhagen	
18		1:48.08	Pieter Coetze	South Africa	16 October 2026	Astana	
19		1:48.25	Masaki Kaneko	Japan	17 January 2016	Tokyo	
20		1:48.32	Xu Jiayu	China	9 November 2018	Tokyo	
21		1:48.43	Lorenzo Mora	Italy	10 December 2023	Otopeni	
22		1:48.53	Luke Greenbank	Great Britain	10 December 2023	Otopeni	
23		1:48.55	Mewen Tomac	France	10 December 2023	Otopeni	
24		1:48.59	Jacob Pebley	United States	29 September 2021	Naples	
25		1:48.60	Tyler Clary	United States	11 August 2013	Berlin	

=== Women long course ===
- Correct as of September 2026

Ath.#	Perf.#	Time	Athlete	Nation	Date	Place	Ref.
1	1	2:03.14	Kaylee McKeown	Australia	10 March 2023	Sydney	
	2	2:03.30	McKeown #2		13 June 2024	Brisbane	
	3	2:03.33	McKeown #3		2 August 2025	Singapore	
2	4	2:03.35	Regan Smith	United States	26 July 2019	Gwangju	
	5	2:03.69	Smith #2		27 July 2019	Gwangju	
	6	2:03.70	McKeown #4		16 June 2023	Melbourne	
	7	2:03.73	McKeown #5		2 August 2024	Paris	
	8	2:03.80	Smith #3		28 June 2023	Indianapolis	
	9	2:03.84	McKeown #6		20 April 2024	Gold Coast	
	10	2:03.85	McKeown #7		29 July 2023	Fukuoka	
	11	2:03.98	McKeown #8		11 June 2026	Sydney	
	12	2:03.99	Smith #4		9 March 2024	Westmont	
3	13	2:04.06	Missy Franklin	United States	3 August 2012	London	
	14	2:04.13	Smith #5		14 August 2026	Irvine	
	15	2:04.18	McKeown #9		14 May 2023	Sydney	
	16	2:04.21	McKeown #10		15 March 2024	Sydney	
	17	2:04.26	Smith #6		2 August 2024	Paris	
	18	2:04.27	Smith #7		2 December 2023	Greensboro	
	19	2:04.28	McKeown #11		17 June 2021	Adelaide	
	20	2:04.29	Smith #8		2 August 2025	Singapore	
	21	2:04.31	McKeown #12		14 May 2021	Sydney	
4	22	2:04.37	Isabelle Stadden	United States	1 May 2026	Fort Lauderdale	
	23	2:04.47	McKeown #13		12 June 2025	Adelaide	
	24	2:04.49	McKeown #14		15 November 2020	Brisbane	
	25	2:04.57	McKeown #15		21 March 2025	Sydney	
5		2:04.81	Kirsty Coventry	Zimbabwe	1 August 2009	Rome	
6		2:04.94	Anastasia Fesikova	Russia	1 August 2009	Rome	
7		2:05.08	Phoebe Bacon	United States	27 April 2022	Greensboro	
8		2:05.09	Claire Curzan	United States	4 June 2025	Indianapolis	
9		2:05.13	Rhyan White	United States	27 April 2022	Greensboro	
10		2:05.42	Kylie Masse	Canada	31 July 2021	Tokyo	
11		2:05.56	Margherita Panziera	Italy	31 March 2021	Riccione	
12		2:05.68	Emily Seebohm	Australia	29 July 2017	Budapest	
13		2:05.77	Peng Xuwei	China	22 September 2026	Tokyo	
14		2:05.85	Katinka Hosszú	Hungary	29 July 2017	Budapest	
15		2:05.99	Maya DiRado	United States	12 August 2016	Rio de Janeiro	
15		2:05.99	Leah Shackley	United States	18 July 2025	Berlin	
17		2:06.05	Maggie Wanezek	United States	19 June 2026	Indianapolis	
18		2:06.06	Belinda Hocking	Australia	30 July 2011	Shanghai	
19		2:06.09	Margaret Hoelzer	United States	29 June 2008	Omaha	
20		2:06.13	Katie Shanahan	United Kingdom	11 August 2026	Paris	
21		2:06.14	Kathleen Baker	United States	9 August 2018	Tokyo	
22		2:06.18	Elizabeth Beisel	United States	2 August 2012	London	
23		2:06.29	Elizabeth Pelton	United States	25 June 2013	Indianapolis	
24		2:06.36	Taylor Ruck	Canada	2 March 2018	Atlanta	
25		2:06.46	Zhao Jing	China	13 November 2010	Guangzhou	

=== Women short course ===
- Correct as of October 2026

Ath.#	Perf.#	Time	Athlete	Nation	Date	Place	Ref.
1	1	1:57.33	Kaylee McKeown	Australia	25 October 2025	Toronto	
2	2	1:57.65	Claire Curzan	United States	31 October 2026	Westmont	
3	3	1:57.86	Regan Smith	United States	25 October 2025	Toronto	
	4	1:57.87	McKeown #2		19 October 2025	Westmont	
	5	1:57.91	Smith #2		19 October 2025	Westmont	
	6	1:58.04	Smith #3		15 December 2024	Budapest	
	7	1:58.49	Smith #4		31 October 2026	Westmont	
	8	1:58.83	Smith #5		2 November 2024	Singapore	
	9	1:58.86	McKeown #3		12 October 2025	Carmel	
	10	1:58.94	McKeown #4		28 November 2020	Brisbane	
4	11	1:59.23	Katinka Hosszú	Hungary	5 December 2014	Doha	
5	12	1:59.25	Minna Atherton	Australia	23 November 2019	London	
	13	1:59.26	McKeown #5		18 December 2022	Melbourne	
6	14	1:59.35	Daryna Zevina	Ukraine	26 August 2016	Chartres	
	15	1:59.48	Atherton #2		26 October 2019	Budapest	
	15	1:59.48	McKeown #6		25 August 2022	Sydney	
7	17	1:59.49	Emily Seebohm	Australia	26 November 2015	Sydney	
	18	1:59.60	Smith #6		26 October 2024	Incheon	
	19	1:59.71	Smith #7		15 October 2026	Charlottesville	
	20	1:59.75	Hosszú #2		11 December 2015	Indianapolis	
	21	1:59.84	Hosszú #3		4 December 2015	Netanya	
	22	1:59.94	Seebohm #2		6 October 2018	Budapest	
	23	1:59.95	Hosszú #4		4 December 2015	Netanya	
8	24	1:59.96	Summer McIntosh	Canada	15 December 2024	Budapest	
9	25	2:00.03	Missy Franklin	United States	22 October 2011	Berlin	
10		2:00.15	Anastasiya Shkurdai	Belarus	10 November 2023	Brest	
11		2:00.18	Shiho Sakai	Japan	14 November 2009	Berlin	
12		2:00.27	Beata Nelson	United States	21 November 2020	Budapest	
13		2:00.55	Isabelle Stadden	United States	15 October 2026	Charlottesville	
14		2:00.69	Kathleen Baker	United States	6 October 2018	Budapest	
15		2:00.71	Lisa Bratton	United States	13 December 2018	Hangzhou	
16		2:00.76	Phoebe Bacon	United States	15 December 2024	Budapest	
17		2:00.83	Elizabeth Simmonds	Great Britain	16 December 2011	Atlanta	
18		2:00.91	Kirsty Coventry	Zimbabwe	11 April 2008	Manchester	
19		2:01.24	Belinda Hocking	Australia	22 October 2011	Berlin	
20		2:01.26	Kira Toussaint	Netherlands	4 November 2021	Kazan	
20		2:01.26	Kylie Masse	Canada	18 December 2022	Melbourne	
22		2:01.29	Amy Bilquist	United States	30 October 2020	Budapest	
23		2:01.33	Courtney Bartholomew	United States	11 December 2015	Indianapolis	
24		2:01.45	Margherita Panziera	Italy	6 December 2019	Glasgow	
25		2:01.57	Daria Ustinova	Russia	4 December 2015	Netanya	

== Olympic champions ==
=== Men ===
Edition	Winner	Time	Notes	Ref.
(France) Paris 1900	Ernst Hoppenberg (GER)	2:47.0	OR	
1904–1960	not included in the program			
(Japan) Tokyo 1964	Jed Graef (USA)	2:10.3	WR	
Mexico City 1968	Roland Matthes (GDR)	2:09.6	OR	
(West Germany) Munich 1972	Roland Matthes (GDR)	2:02.82	=WR	
(Canada) Montreal 1976	John Naber (USA)	1:59.19	WR	
(Soviet Union) Moscow 1980	Sándor Wladár (HUN)	2:01.93		
(United States) Los Angeles 1984	Rick Carey (USA)	2:00.23	(Note: Rick Carey set an Olympic record of 1:58.99 in the heats.)	
(South Korea) Seoul 1988	Igor Polyansky (URS)	1:59.37		
(Spain) Barcelona 1992	Martín López-Zubero (ESP)	1:58.47	OR	
(United States) Atlanta 1996	Brad Bridgewater (USA)	1:58.54		
(Australia) Sydney 2000	Lenny Krayzelburg (USA)	1:56.76	OR	
(Greece) Athens 2004	Aaron Peirsol (USA)	1:54.95	OR	
(China) Beijing 2008	Ryan Lochte (USA)	1:53.94	WR	
(United Kingdom) London 2012	Tyler Clary (USA)	1:53.41	OR	
(Brazil) Rio de Janeiro 2016	Ryan Murphy (USA)	1:53.62		
(Japan) Tokyo 2020	Evgeny Rylov (ROC)	1:53.27	OR	
(France) Paris 2024	Hubert Kós (HUN)	1:54.26		

=== Women ===
Edition	Winner	Time	Notes	Ref.
Mexico City 1968	Lillian Watson (USA)	2:24.8	OR	
(West Germany) Munich 1972	Melissa Belote (USA)	2:19.19	WR	
(Canada) Montreal 1976	Ulrike Tauber (GDR)	2:13.43	OR	
(Soviet Union) Moscow 1980	Rica Reinisch (GDR)	2:11.77	WR	
(United States) Los Angeles 1984	Jolanda de Rover (NED)	2:12.38		
(South Korea) Seoul 1988	Krisztina Egerszegi (HUN)	2:09.29	OR	
(Spain) Barcelona 1992	Krisztina Egerszegi (HUN)	2:07.06	OR	
(United States) Atlanta 1996	Krisztina Egerszegi (HUN)	2:07.83		
(Australia) Sydney 2000	Diana Mocanu (ROU)	2:08.16		
(Greece) Athens 2004	Kirsty Coventry (ZIM)	2:09.19		
(China) Beijing 2008	Kirsty Coventry (ZIM)	2:05.24	WR	
(United Kingdom) London 2012	Missy Franklin (USA)	2:04.06	WR	
(Brazil) Rio de Janeiro 2016	Maya DiRado (USA)	2:05.99		
(Japan) Tokyo 2020	Kaylee McKeown (AUS)	2:04.68		
(France) Paris 2024	Kaylee McKeown (AUS)	2:03.73	OR	

== World champions (long course) ==
=== Men ===
Edition	Winner	Time	Notes	Ref.
(Socialist Federal Republic of Yugoslavia) Belgrade 1973	Roland Matthes (GDR)	2:01.87	WR	
(Colombia) Cali 1975	Zoltán Verrasztó (HUN)	2:05.05		
(West Germany) West Berlin 1978	Jesse Vassallo (USA)	2:02.16		
(Ecuador) Guayaquil 1982	Rick Carey (USA)	2:00.82	CR	
(Spain) Madrid 1986	Igor Polyansky (URS)	1:58.78	CR	
(Australia) Perth 1991	Martín López-Zubero (ESP)	1:59.52		
(Italy) Rome 1994	Vladimir Selkov (RUS)	1:57.42	CR	
(Australia) Perth 1998	Lenny Krayzelburg (USA)	1:58.84		
(Japan) Fukuoka 2001	Aaron Peirsol (USA)	1:57.13	CR	
(Spain) Barcelona 2003	Aaron Peirsol (USA)	1:55.92	(Note: Aaron Peirsol set a championship record of 1:55.82 in the semifinals.)	
(Canada) Montreal 2005	Aaron Peirsol (USA)	1:54.66	WR	
(Australia) Melbourne 2007	Ryan Lochte (USA)	1:54.32	WR	
(Italy) Rome 2009	Aaron Peirsol (USA)	1:51.92	WR	
(China) Shanghai 2011	Ryan Lochte (USA)	1:52.96		
(Spain) Barcelona 2013	Ryan Lochte (USA)	1:53.79		
(Russia) Kazan 2015	Mitch Larkin (AUS)	1:53.58		
(Hungary) Budapest 2017	Evgeny Rylov (RUS)	1:53.61		
(South Korea) Gwangju 2019	Evgeny Rylov (RUS)	1:53.40		
(Hungary) Budapest 2022	Ryan Murphy (USA)	1:54.52		
(Japan) Fukuoka 2023	Hubert Kós (HUN)	1:54.14		
(Qatar) Doha 2024	Hugo González (ESP)	1:55.30		
Singapore 2025	Hubert Kós (HUN)	1:53.19		

=== Women ===
Edition	Winner	Time	Notes	Ref.
(Socialist Federal Republic of Yugoslavia) Belgrade 1973	Melissa Belote (USA)	2:20.52	CR	
(Colombia) Cali 1975	Birgit Treiber (GDR)	2:15.46	WR	
(West Germany) West Berlin 1978	Linda Jezek (USA)	2:11.93	WR	
(Ecuador) Guayaquil 1982	Cornelia Sirch (GDR)	2:09.91	WR	
(Spain) Madrid 1986	Cornelia Sirch (GDR)	2:11.37		
(Australia) Perth 1991	Krisztina Egerszegi (HUN)	2:09.15	CR	
(Italy) Rome 1994	He Cihong (CHN)	2:07.40	CR	
(Australia) Perth 1998	Roxana Maracineanu (FRA)	2:11.26		
(Japan) Fukuoka 2001	Diana Mocanu (ROU)	2:09.94		
(Spain) Barcelona 2003	Katy Sexton (GBR)	2:08.74		
(Canada) Montreal 2005	Kirsty Coventry (ZIM)	2:08.52		
(Australia) Melbourne 2007	Margaret Hoelzer (USA)	2:07.16	CR	
(Italy) Rome 2009	Kirsty Coventry (ZIM)	2:04.81	WR	
(China) Shanghai 2011	Missy Franklin (USA)	2:05.10		
(Spain) Barcelona 2013	Missy Franklin (USA)	2:04.76	CR	
(Russia) Kazan 2015	Emily Seebohm (AUS)	2:05.81		
(Hungary) Budapest 2017	Emily Seebohm (AUS)	2:05.68		
(South Korea) Gwangju 2019	Regan Smith (USA)	2:03.69	(Note: Regan Smith set a world record of 2:03.35 in the semifinals.)	
(Hungary) Budapest 2022	Kaylee McKeown (AUS)	2:05.08		
(Japan) Fukuoka 2023	Kaylee McKeown (AUS)	2:03.85		
(Qatar) Doha 2024	Claire Curzan (USA)	2:05.77		
Singapore 2025	Kaylee McKeown (AUS)	2:03.33	CR	

== World champions (short course) ==
=== Men ===
Edition	Winner	Time	Notes	Ref.
(Spain) Palma de Mallorca 1993	Tripp Schwenk (USA)	1:54.19	CR	
(Brazil) Rio de Janeiro 1995	Rodolfo Falcón (CUB)	1:55.16		
(Sweden) Gothenburg 1997	Neisser Bent (CUB)	1:54.21		
Hong Kong 1999	Josh Watson (AUS)	1:54.67		
(Greece) Athens 2000	Gordan Kožulj (CRO)	1:53.31	CR	
(Russia) Moscow 2002	Aaron Peirsol (USA)	1:51.17	WR	
(United States) Indianapolis 2004	Aaron Peirsol (USA)	1:50.52	WR	
(China) Shanghai 2006	Ryan Lochte (USA)	1:49.05	WR	
(United Kingdom) Manchester 2008	Markus Rogan (AUT)	1:47.84	WR	
(United Arab Emirates) Dubai 2010	Ryan Lochte (USA)	1:46.68	CR	
(Turkey) Istanbul 2012	Radosław Kawęcki (POL)	1:48.48		
(Qatar) Doha 2014	Radosław Kawęcki (POL)	1:47.38		
(Canada) Windsor 2016	Radosław Kawęcki (POL)	1:47.63		
(China) Hangzhou 2018	Evgeny Rylov (RUS)	1:47.02		
(United Arab Emirates) Abu Dhabi 2021	Radosław Kawęcki (POL)	1:48.68		
(Australia) Melbourne 2022	Ryan Murphy (USA)	1:47.41		
(Hungary) Budapest 2024	Hubert Kós (HUN)	1:45.65	CR	

=== Women ===
Edition	Winner	Time	Notes	Ref.
(Spain) Palma de Mallorca 1993	He Cihong (CHN)	2:06.09	WR	
(Brazil) Rio de Janeiro 1995	Mette Jacobsen (DEN)	2:08.18		
(Sweden) Gothenburg 1997	Chen Yan (CHN)	2:07.50		
Hong Kong 1999	Mai Nakamura (JPN)	2:06.49		
(Greece) Athens 2000	Antje Buschschulte (GER)	2:07.29		
(Russia) Moscow 2002	Lindsay Benko (USA)	2:04.97	CR	
(United States) Indianapolis 2004	Margaret Hoelzer (USA)	2:05.84		
(China) Shanghai 2006	Margaret Hoelzer (USA)	2:05.29		
(United Kingdom) Manchester 2008	Kirsty Coventry (ZIM)	2:00.91	WR	
(United Arab Emirates) Dubai 2010	Alexianne Castel (FRA)	2:01.67		
(Turkey) Istanbul 2012	Daryna Zevina (UKR)	2:02.24		
(Qatar) Doha 2014	Katinka Hosszú (HUN)	1:59.23	WR	
(Canada) Windsor 2016	Katinka Hosszú (HUN)	2:00.79		
(China) Hangzhou 2018	Lisa Bratton (USA)	2:00.71		
(United Arab Emirates) Abu Dhabi 2021	Rhyan White (USA)	2:01.58		
(Australia) Melbourne 2022	Kaylee McKeown (AUS)	1:59.26		
(Hungary) Budapest 2024	Regan Smith (USA)	1:58.04	WR	
