= Tom Stock (swimmer) =

American swimmer

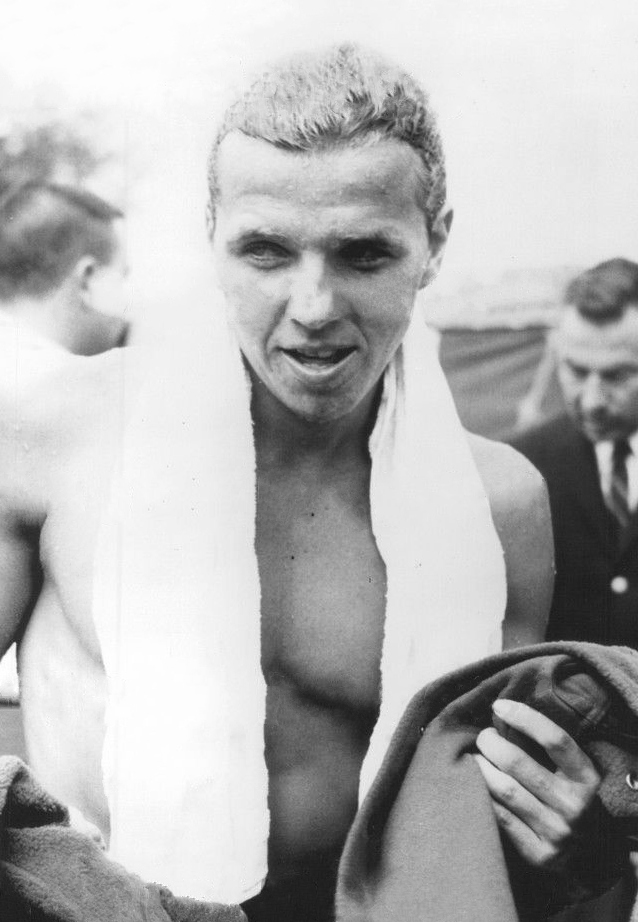
- Stock in 1962

Personal information
- Born: c. 1942
- Occupation(s): Owner, BVD Steel Hauling; Known as Versto, Inc.
- Weight: 130 lb (59 kg)
- Spouse: Ann
- Children: 3

Sport
- Sport: Swimming
- Strokes: Backstroke
- Club: Bloomington YMCA; Bloomington, Indiana
- College team: Indiana University (IU)
- Coach: Dave Stacey; James "Doc Counsilman (IU)

Tom Stock (born c. 1942) is a retired American backstroke swimmer who competed for the University of Indiana. During his career from around 1956 to 1964, he set several world and 14 national records.

== Early life ==
Born in 1942, Stock attended Bloomington High School in Bloomington, Illinois, where he graduated in June, 1960. From 1957-1960, he was coached by Dave Stacy, and swam for both Bloomington High School and the Bloomington YMCA. Stock set one of his earliest records for the 200-meter backstroke at the Indiana State Swim Meet on July 10, 1960, with a time of 2:16.9. Stock, in three separate instances, set and reset the Conference championship times in the 100-yard backstroke, with his final time during his Senior year at Bloomington High with a :58.8.

Among the events comprising Stock's ten world records were the 200 and 100 meter backstroke, several relays, and the 220 yard backstroke. Tom won a total of eight swimming championships on the national level and competed with the U.S. team at international meets in Japan, Europe and South America.

== Indiana University ==
Stock swam for the Indiana University where he was coached by James "Doc" Counsilman, and later graduated with a BS. While swimming backstroke for Indiana from 1962-1964, he was awarded All-American honors a total of six times. He captured seven Amateur Athletic Union titles between 1960 and 1962 in backstroke and medley relay events, and at the 1962 AAU indoor championship, won the medley relay and backstroke events. As only a Freshman at Indiana, Stock became the first person to swim the 200-yard backstroke in under two minutes.

Despite being a world champion, Stock had poor luck during the trials' qualification and selection process for the U.S. Olympic team during the early 1960's. At the 1960 U.S. Olympic trials, which he swam on August 4, 1960 at the Brenan Pools in Detroit, he finished third in the 100-meter backstroke, and was not selected for the U.S. Olympic team to compete at the Rome Olympic Games, as only two swimmers were chosen, despite three being chosen in previous years. Having not fully recovered from a case of pneumonia the previous winter, he was unable to qualify for the 1964 Olympic Trial finals held in early September, 1964 in Astoria, New York after competing in the preliminary heats in the 100 and 200-meter backstroke events, and missed his chance to be selected for the 1964 Tokyo Olympic team.

== Honors ==
In 2004 he was inducted to the Indiana University Athletic Hall of Fame. He is a member of the prestigious International Swimming Hall of Fame, based in Fort Lauderdale as of 1989. He was named the American Swimmer of the Year in 1962.

Stock has resided in Hinsdale, Illinois, with his wife, Ann, and two children. Together with a fellow swimmer Gary Verhoeven he was an owner of the BVD Steel Hauling Company. Retiring in 2008, he was a General Partner and COO (Chief Operating Officer) with Verhoeven for the steel transportation company Versto, Inc, based in Chesterton, Indiana, also known as BVD Trucking. He was inducted into the Bloomington High School Hall of Fame in 2010.

== See also ==
- List of members of the International Swimming Hall of Fame
- World record progression 100 metres backstroke
- World record progression 200 metres backstroke
- World record progression 4 × 100 metres medley relay
