= Lore Trittner =

Austrian swimmer (born 1939)

Personal information
- Born: 8 July 1939 (age 87) Vienna, Austria

Sport
- Sport: Swimming

Lore Trittner (born 8 July 1939) is an Austrian former swimmer. She competed in the women's 100 metre backstroke at the 1960 Summer Olympics.
