= Karen Muir =

South African swimmer

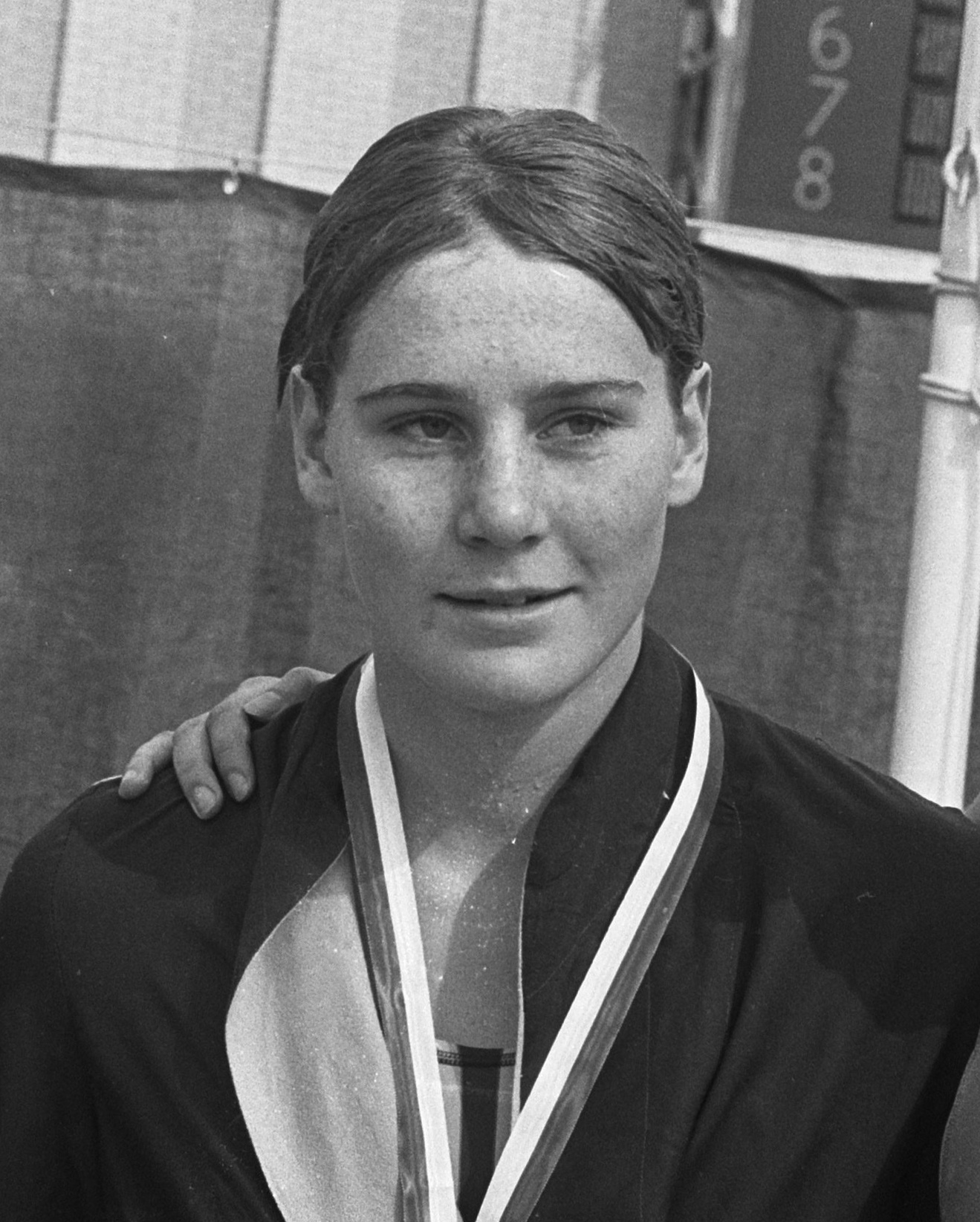
- Karen Muir in 1967

Personal information
- Full name: Karen Muir
- National team: South Africa
- Born: 16 September 1952 Kimberley, Cape Province, Union of South Africa
- Died: 1 April 2013 (aged 60) Mossel Bay, Western Cape, South Africa

Sport
- Sport: Swimming
- Strokes: Backstroke

Karen Muir (16 September 1952 – 1 April 2013) was a South African competitive swimmer. Born and raised in Kimberley, she attended the Diamantveld High School, where she matriculated in 1970.

== Biography ==
On 10 August 1965, aged twelve years, Karen Muir became the youngest person to break a sporting world record in any discipline when she swam the 110 yards backstroke in 1m 08.7s at the ASA National Junior Championships in Blackpool, England.

Over the following five years Muir would go on to set fifteen world records in the backstroke at 100 metres, 200 metres, 110 yards, and 220 yards. She also won 22 South African Championships and three US National Championships. Due to the sporting boycott of South Africa during her active career, she was never able to participate in an Olympic Games.

Muir was elected to the International Swimming Hall of Fame in 1980. After retiring from her sport, she qualified, through the University of the Orange Free State, as a doctor and practiced in the African continent. Since 2000 she worked as a family physician in Vanderhoof, British Columbia, Canada. During 2009, she was diagnosed with breast cancer. Muir died from the disease in Mossel Bay, South Africa on 1 April 2013, at the age of 60.

Kimberley's Olympic-sized swimming pool was named the Karen Muir Swimming Pool in honour of the young swimmer, who was nicknamed locally as the "Tepid Torpedo". When Muir revisited the city in 2009 she donated her Springbok blazer to the Diamantveld High School.

== See also ==
- List of members of the International Swimming Hall of Fame
- World record progression 100 metres backstroke
- World record progression 200 metres backstroke
