= Marilyn Wilson (swimmer) =

Australian swimmer

Personal information
- Full name: Marilyn Joy Wilson
- National team: Australia
- Born: 14 July 1943 (age 82) Richmond, Victoria
- Height: 1.63 m (5 ft 4 in)
- Weight: 58 kg (128 lb)

Sport
- Sport: Swimming
- Strokes: Backstroke
Medal record
Women's swimming
Representing Australia
Olympic Games
Silver medal – second place	1960 Rome	4×100 m medley relay

Marilyn Joy Wilson (born 14 July 1943), known after her marriage as Marilyn Young, is an Australian former backstroke swimmer of the 1960s, who won a silver medal in the women's 4×100-metre medley relay at the 1960 Summer Olympics in Rome. She combined with her Australian teammates Dawn Fraser, Jan Andrew and Rosemary Lassig to finish second in the medley relay, trailing the Americans relay team by five seconds. In her only individual event, the women's 100-metre backstroke, Wilson competed in the preliminary heats, but did not advance.

== See also ==
- List of Olympic medalists in swimming (women)
