= Hannelore Janele =

Austrian swimmer

Personal information
- Born: 17 April 1943 (age 83) Vienna, Austria

Sport
- Sport: Swimming

Hannelore Janele (born 17 April 1943) is an Austrian former swimmer. She competed in the women's 100 metre butterfly at the 1960 Summer Olympics.
