= Patty Kempner =

American swimmer (born 1942)

Personal information
- Full name: Patricia Kempner
- Nickname: "Patty"
- National team: United States
- Born: August 24, 1942 (age 84) Augusta, Georgia
- Height: 5 ft 3 in (1.60 m)
- Weight: 123 lb (56 kg)

Sport
- Sport: Swimming
- Strokes: Breaststroke, individual medley
- Club: Kristensen Swim School
- College team: University of Arizona
Medal record
Women's swimming
Representing the United States
Olympic Games
Gold medal – first place	1960 Rome	4x100 m medley relay

Patricia Kempner (born August 24, 1942) is an American former competition swimmer, Olympic champion, and former world record-holder in two events.

Kempner began competing in swim meets around the age of seven, and started swimming in earnest with Kris Kristensen as her coach around the age of ten. She was soon training twice daily during summer breaks. As a youth, swimming for Kristensen Swim School, she set a new Southern Pacific AAU record in the 11-12 age group category for the 50-yard breast stroke of 37.9.

While swimming for the Kris Kristensen Swimming School on February 23, 1957, she broke the Senior Women's American National record for the 200-yard individual medley, with a 2:29.2, breaking the old record by two seconds. Her swim also set a SPA AAU record. The event took place at the Aqua Carnival at El Camino Junior College, and was sponsored by the Southern California Youth Swimming Association. She also had a first place finish in the 100-yard breaststroke in the meet.

== 200 IM World Record ==
In a career high point, at the age of only 14, on April 27, 1957, she became the first woman to set an official world record in the 200-meter individual medley, clocking 2:48.2 at a swim meet in Chicago, Illinois. The record would survive for over a year.

Prior to the Olympics, Kempner captured the AAU indoor 100-yard breaststroke title in 1957 and 1958. At the January, 1959 Pan American Games, she won a silver medal in the 200-meter breaststroke with a time of 3:00.1.

== 1960 Olympics ==
At the 1960 Summer Olympics in Rome, she won a gold medal by swimming the breaststroke leg for the first-place U.S. team in the women's 4×100-meter medley relay, together with teammates Lynn Burke (backstroke), Carolyn Schuler (butterfly), and Chris von Saltza (freestyle). The event was new to the Olympics in 1960, and the U.S. medley relay team set a new world record in the event final of 4:41.1. Individually, she also competed in the women's 200-meter breaststroke, finishing seventh in the event final.

Kempner enrolled at the University of Arizona in the Fall of 1960.

== See also ==
- List of Olympic medalists in swimming (women)
- World record progression 200 metres individual medley
- World record progression 4 × 100 metres medley relay

Records
Preceded by Incumbent	Women's 200-meter individual medley world record-holder (long course); April 27, 1957 – July 20, 1958	Succeeded by Becky Collins
