= Nadine Delache =

French swimmer

Personal information
- Born: 7 February 1941 (age 85) Rouvray, France

Sport
- Sport: Swimming

Nadine Delache (born 7 February 1941) is a French former swimmer. She competed in the women's 100 metre backstroke at the 1960 Summer Olympics.
