= Simone Theis =

Luxembourgish swimmer

Personal information
- Born: 7 September 1940 (age 85) Luxembourg, Luxembourg

Sport
- Sport: Swimming

Simone Theis (born 7 September 1940) is a Luxembourgish swimmer. She competed in the women's 100 metre backstroke at the 1960 Summer Olympics.
