= Rhodesia and Nyasaland at the 1960 Summer Olympics =

Rhodesia at the 1960 Summer Olympics
- Flag of the Federation of Rhodesia and Nyasaland
- IOC code: RHO
- NOC: Rhodesia Olympic Committee

in Rome
- Competitors: 14 in 6 sports
- Medals: Gold 0 Silver 0 Bronze 0 Total 0

Summer Olympics appearances (overview)
- 1928; 1932–1956; 1960; 1964; 1968–1976; 1980; 1984; 1988; 1992; 1996; 2000; 2004; 2008; 2012; 2016; 2020; 2024

Rhodesia competed at the 1960 Summer Olympics in Rome, Italy. It was the first time in 32 years that the nation was represented at the Olympic Games. Fourteen athletes—Southern Rhodesians and one Northern Rhodesian, boxer Abe Bekker—competed under the name Rhodesia while representing the Federation of Rhodesia and Nyasaland (1953–1963).

== Diving ==
Women

Athlete	Event	Preliminary		Semi-final				Final			
Athlete	Event	Points	Rank	Points	Rank	Total	Rank	Points	Rank	Total	Rank
Alexandra Morgenrood	3 m springboard	47.12	13 Q	34.95	14	82.07	13	Did not advance			

== Shooting ==
One shooter represented Rhodesia in 1960.

Trap

- Bill Gulliver

== Swimming ==
Women

Athlete	Event	Heat		Semifinal		Final	
Athlete	Event	Time	Rank	Time	Rank	Time	Rank
Dottie Sutcliffe	100 m freestyle	1:09.0	30	Did not advance			
Hillary Wilson	400 m freestyle	5:16.8	15	—		Did not advance	
Lynette Cooper	100 m backstroke	1:15.8	22	—		Did not advance	
Dottie Sutcliffe	100 m backstroke	1:15.2	20	—		Did not advance	
Meg Miners	200 m breaststroke	3:05.2	23	—		Did not advance	
Hillary Wilson	100 m butterfly	1:21.4	25	—		Did not advance	
Lynette Cooper; Meg Miners; Dottie Sutcliffe; Hillary Wilson	4 × 100 m medley	5:12.9	12	—		Did not advance	

== See also ==
- Rhodesia at the 1960 Summer Paralympics
