= Satoko Tanaka =

Japanese swimmer (born 1942)

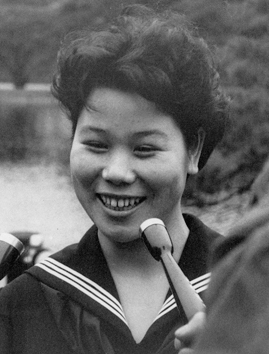

Personal information
- Nationality: Japanese
- Born: February 3, 1942 (age 84) Sasebo, Nagasaki
- Height: 158 cm (5 ft 2 in)
- Weight: 59 kg (130 lb)

Sport
- Sport: Swimming
- Strokes: Backstroke
Medal record
Representing Japan
Olympic Games
Bronze medal – third place	1960 Rome	100 m backstroke
Asian Games
Gold medal – first place	1958 Tokyo	100 m backstroke
Gold medal – first place	1962 Jakarta	100 m backstroke
Gold medal – first place	1966 Bangkok	100 m backstroke

Satoko Tanaka (田中 聡子, Tanaka Satoko; born February 3, 1942) is a retired Japanese backstroke swimmer. She competed at the 1960 and 1964 Olympics in the 100 m backstroke and 4×100 m medley relay. She won individual bronze in 1960 and finished fourth in both events in 1964. Between 1959 and 1964 she set 10 world records in the 200 m backstroke, but did not have a chance to compete in this discipline. She set five more world records in the 110 yd and 220 yd backstroke. Tanaka held the national records in the 100 m and 200 m backstroke for 12 years. In retirement for many decades she worked as a swimming coach, and competed in the masters category. In 1991 she was inducted into the International Swimming Hall of Fame.

== See also ==
- List of members of the International Swimming Hall of Fame
- World record progression 200 metres backstroke

Records
Preceded by Lynn Burke	Women's 200 metre backstroke world record holder (long course); July 23, 1960 – September 28, 1964	Succeeded by Cathy Ferguson
