= Jan Andrew =

Australian swimmer (born 1943)

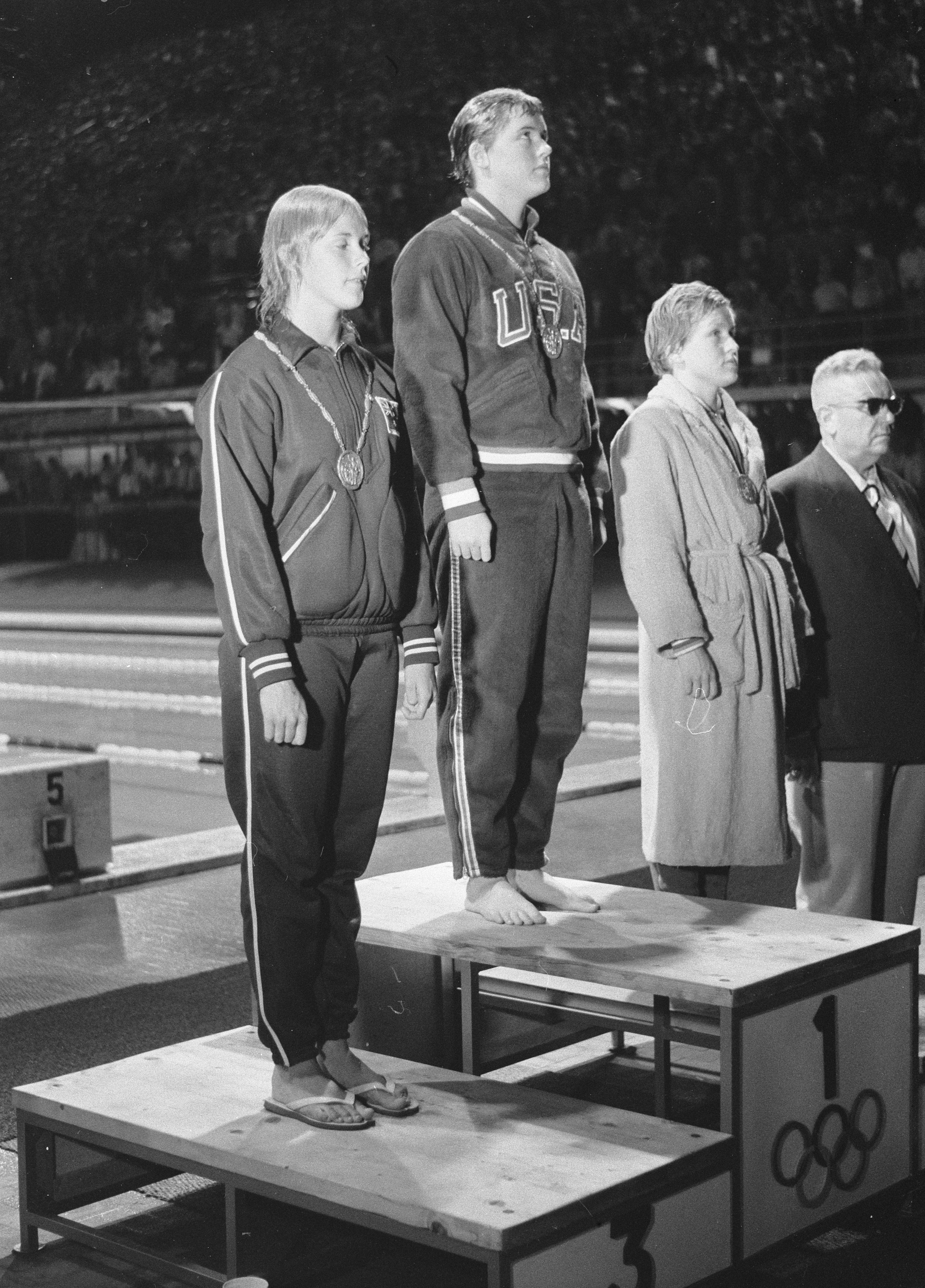
- 100 m butterfly medalists at 1960 Olympics: Marianne Heemskerk, Carolyn Schuler and Jan Andrew

Personal information
- Full name: Janice Andrew
- National team: Australia
- Born: 25 November 1943 (age 82) Lindfield, New South Wales, Australia
- Height: 1.62 m (5 ft 4 in)
- Weight: 54 kg (119 lb)

Sport
- Sport: Swimming
- Strokes: Butterfly
Medal record
Women's swimming
Representing Australia
Olympic Games
Silver medal – second place	1960 Rome	4×100 m medley
Bronze medal – third place	1960 Rome	100 m butterfly

Janice Andrew (born 25 November 1943), also known by her married name Janice Thornett, is an Australian butterfly swimmer of the 1950s, who won a bronze medal in the 100-metre butterfly and a silver medal in the 4×100-metre medley relay at the 1960 Summer Olympics.

Arriving at the 1960 Olympics in Rome, Andrew had been regarded as a medal contender in the 100-metre butterfly. She was in the spotlight when during a team meeting, Australian team officials had ordered Dawn Fraser to swim the butterfly leg in the 4×100-metre medley relay preliminaries in her place, as she was ordered to rest ahead of her individual event later that night. Fraser refused, hitting Andrew with a pillow. It was only when Alva Colquhoun volunteered that the dispute was resolved. In the 100-metre event that night, Andrew claimed bronze behind Carolyn Schuler of the United States and Marianne Heemskerk of the Netherlands. She later combined with Fraser, Rosemary Lassig and Marilyn Wilson to register a silver medal in the 4×100-metre medley relay, trailing the Americans home by 5 seconds.

== See also ==
- List of Olympic medalists in swimming (women)
- World record progression 100 metres butterfly

Records
Preceded by Nancy Ramey	Women's 100-metre butterfly world record-holder (long course); 2 April 1961 – 12 August 1961	Succeeded by Mary Stewart
