= Hugo González =

Hugo González may refer to:

- Hugo González (Chilean footballer) (born 1963), Chilean former footballer
- Hugo González (Mexican footballer) (born 1990), Mexican footballer
- Hugo González (Paraguayan footballer) (born 1948), Paraguayan footballer
- Hugo González (Spanish footballer) (born 2003), Spanish footballer
- Hugo González (basketball) (born 2006), Spanish basketball player
- Hugo González (swimmer) (born 1999), Spanish swimmer
