= Anne Van Parijs =

Belgian swimmer

Personal information
- Born: 14 April 1944 (age 82) La Louvière, Belgium

Sport
- Sport: Swimming

Anne Van Parijs (born 14 April 1944) is a Belgian former swimmer. She competed in the women's 100 metre backstroke at the 1960 Summer Olympics.
