= Zoltan Okalyi =

Australian fencer

Personal information
- Born: 31 January 1938 (age 88) Lengyel, Hungary

Sport
- Sport: Fencing
- Club: VRI Fencing Club

Zoltan Okalyi (born 31 January 1938) is an Australian fencer. He competed in the team foil event at the 1960 Summer Olympics. He was a longstanding member of the Melbourne-based VRI Fencing Club.
