= Milton Francis =

Australian rower

Personal information
- Nationality: Australian
- Born: 18 May 1932 Western Australia, Australia
- Died: 30 June 2009 (aged 77) Ballarat, Victoria, Australia

Sport
- Sport: Rowing
- Club: West Australian Rowing Club

Achievements and titles
- National finals: King's Cup 1955 - 1965

Milton Francis (18 May 1932 – 30 June 2009) was an Australian representative rower. He competed in the men's eight event at the 1960 Summer Olympics. He was twice a national champion and made nine King's Cup state representative appearances for Western Australia achieving podium finishes in eight of those.

== Club and state rowing ==
Francis' senior club rowing was from the West Australian Rowing Club.

Francis first made state representative selection for Western Australia in the 1955 senior eight which contested and won the King's Cup at the Australian annual Interstate Regatta. He then rowed in every Western Australian King's Cup eights from 1956 to 1965 excepting 1957 and 1961. He shared in two wins (1955 and 1960); two silvers (1958 and 1962); four bronzes (1959 and 1963–65) and one fourth placing (1956).

Francis was one of only two 1959 WA King's Cup oarsmen (the other was John Ledder) whom coach Grant agreed to retain into the 1960 crew as he sought to build a heavy and more powerful eight. This enabled Francis to be part of the 1960 King's Cup win and the Olympic representation.

== International representative rowing ==
The entire West Australian champion King's Cup eight of 1960 were selected without alteration as the Australian eight to compete at the 1960 Rome Olympics. The crew was graded as the second of the seven Australian Olympic boats picked for Rome and was therefore fully funded by the Australian Olympic Committee. Francis rowed in the bow seat of the eight. They were eliminated in the repechage on Lake Albano at the 1960 Olympics.
