= Arlette Faidiga =

Italian swimmer (1938–2023)

Personal information
- Born: 1 August 1938 Fiume, Kingdom of Italy
- Died: 23 June 2023 (aged 84) Turin, Italy

Sport
- Sport: Swimming

Arlette Faidiga (1 August 1938 – 23 June 2023) was an Italian swimmer. She competed in the women's 100 metre backstroke at the 1960 Summer Olympics.
