= Meg Miners =

Rhodesian swimmer (born 1944)

Personal information
- Born: 23 August 1944 (age 81) Salisbury, Southern Rhodesia

Sport
- Sport: Swimming

Meg Miners (born 23 August 1944) is a Rhodesian former swimmer. She competed in two events for Rhodesia at the 1960 Summer Olympics. She was the first woman to represent Rhodesia at the Olympics.
