= John Coon (sailor) =

Australian sailor

John Malcolm Coon (31 October 1929 - 27 June 2010) was an Australian sailor who competed in the 1960 Summer Olympics and in the 1964 Summer Olympics.
