= Ursula Küper =

German swimmer (born 1937)

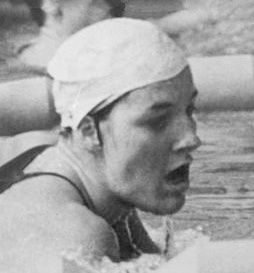
- Ursula Küper in 1963

Personal information
- Born: 28 November 1937 (age 88) Berlin, Germany
- Height: 1.80 m (5 ft 11 in)
- Weight: 73 kg (161 lb)

Sport
- Sport: Swimming
- Club: SC Dynamo Berlin
Medal record
Representing Germany
Olympic Games
Bronze medal – third place	1960 Rome	4×100 m medley relay
European Championships
Bronze medal – third place	1962 Leipzig	200 m breaststroke

Ursula Küper (later Stille, born 28 November 1937) is a retired German swimmer. In 1960, she set a world record in the 100 m breaststroke. The same year she competed at the 1960 Summer Olympics and won a bronze medal in the 4 × 100 m medley relay. Two years later she won a bronze medal in the 200 m breaststroke at the 1962 European Aquatics Championships. She finished eighth in this event at the 1964 Olympics.

Her stepdaughter Antje Stille competed in swimming at the 1976 Olympics; Küper is married to her father Peter Stille.
