= Laura Ranwell =

South African swimmer

Personal information
- Born: 13 December 1941 (age 84) Johannesburg, South Africa

Sport
- Sport: Swimming

Laura Ranwell (born 13 December 1941) is a South African former swimmer. She competed in the women's 100 metre backstroke at the 1960 Summer Olympics.
