= Lynn Burke =

American swimmer (born 1943)

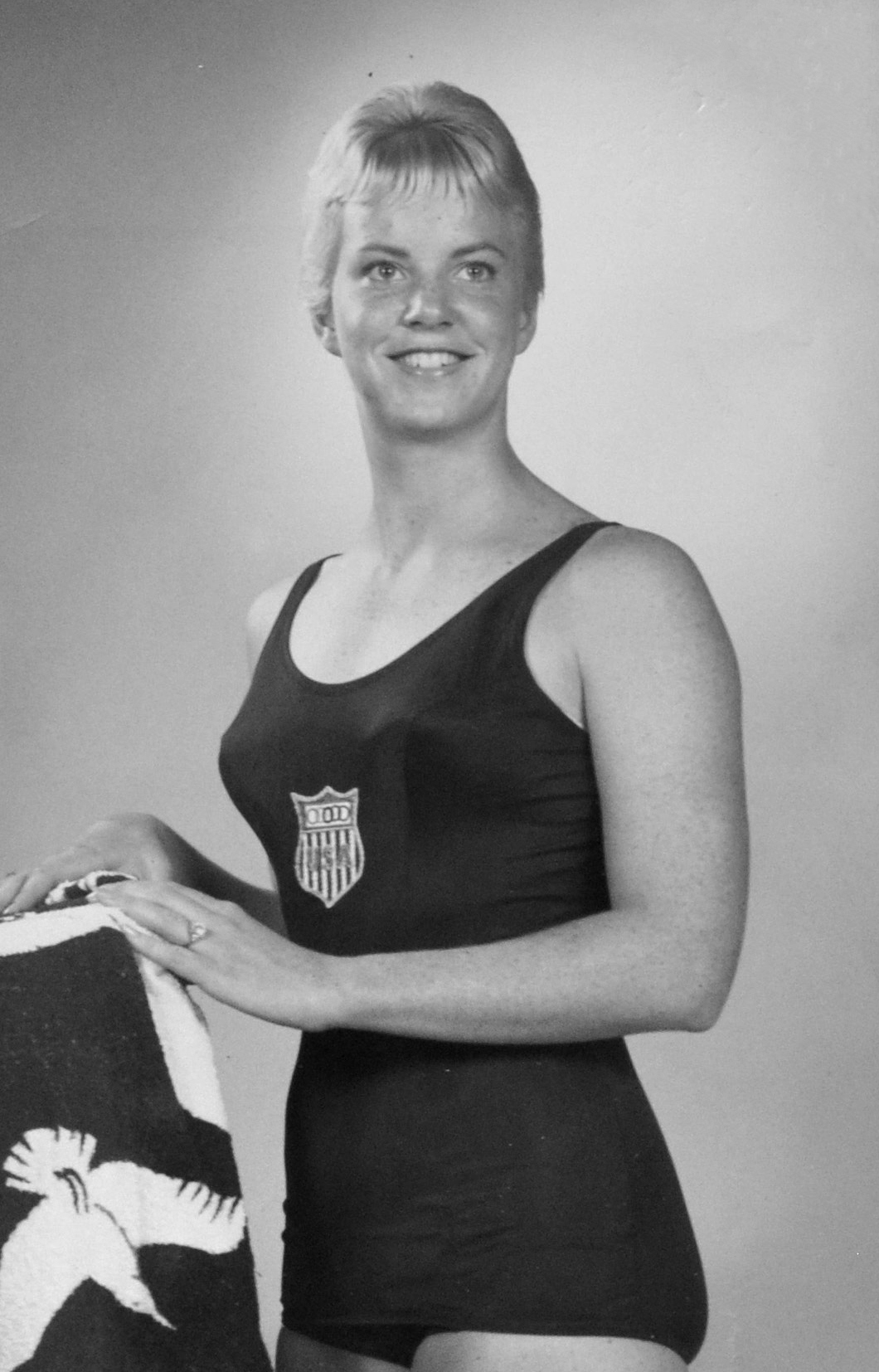
- Burke in 1960

Personal information
- Full name: Lynn Edythe Burke
- National team: United States
- Born: March 22, 1943 (age 83) New York, New York, U.S.
- Height: 5 ft 8 in (1.73 m)
- Weight: 134 lb (61 kg)

Sport
- Sport: Swimming
- Strokes: Backstroke
- Club: Santa Clara Swim Club
- Coach: George Haines (Santa Clara)
Medal record
Women's swimming
Representing the United States
Olympic Games
Gold medal – first place	1960 Rome	100 m backstroke
Gold medal – first place	1960 Rome	4×100 m medley relay

Lynn Edythe Burke (born March 22, 1943), also known by her married name Lynn McConville, is an American former competition swimmer, a 1960 Rome Olympic champion in backstroke, and a former world record-holder in two events.

== Early swimming ==
Born on March 22, 1943, to Mr. and Mrs. Robert Burke, Lynn Burke began swimming in her hometown of Flushing, New York by the age of four, and may have won her first medal at the Long Island Junior Swimming Championship at the Flushing YMCA around the age of nine. She swam for the Flushing YMCA for several years under Jess Brown, the Director of Athletics. Swimming as the Metropolitan American Athletic Union champion for the Flushing Y, at a New York Athletic Club meet on June 29, 1956 at the age of 13, Burke captured the 100-meter backstroke event in a time of 1:29.3. Representing the Flushing Y in January 1958, at a sanctioned AAU meet at Brentwood High, Burke won the 100-yard backstroke in the competitive time of 1:11.

In July, 1959, Burke represented Portland's Multinomah Athletic Club where she swam a 1:15.3 in a meet for the 110-yard backstroke. A highly competitive program that included many Olympians in their history, MAC was coached by Jim Campbell from 1956-1958, and Jack Pobochenko from 1959-1960. Other 1960 Rome Olympic Athletes coached at the Multinomah Club included Carolyn Wood, a 1960 Olympic gold medalist in the 4x100-meter freestyle relay, and Don Schollander, a four-time Olympic gold medalist.

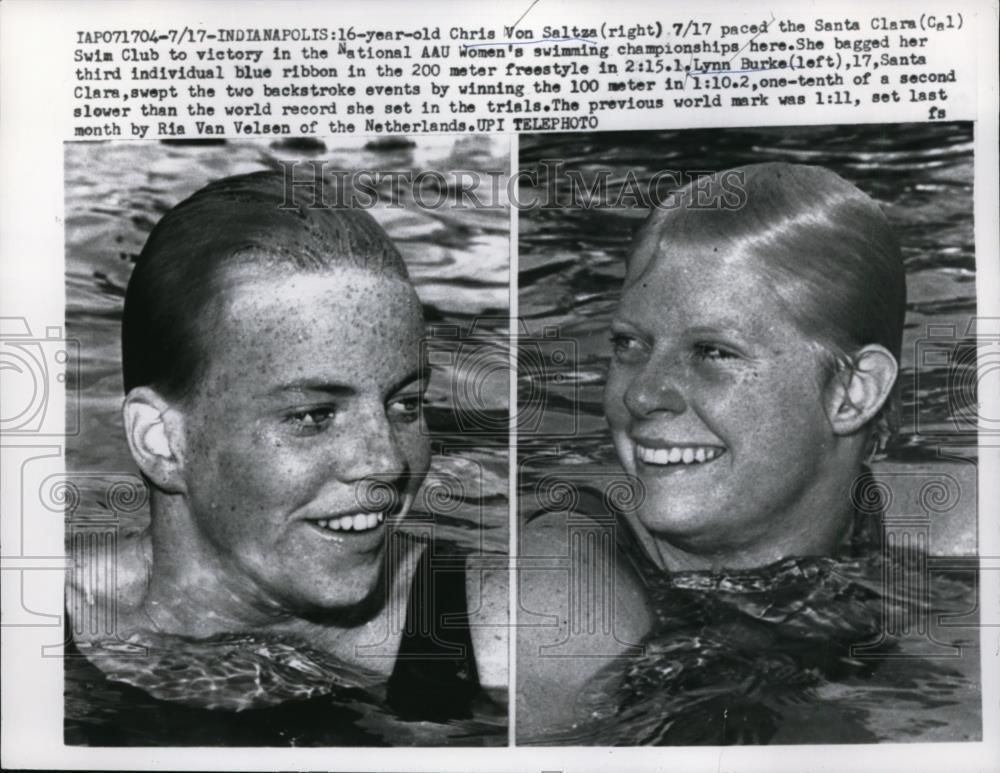
Burke and von Saltza, 1960

After moving to California to train, Burke lived with the family of Chris von Saltza by September 1959, where she attended Los Gatos High School and swam for the Santa Clara Swim Club, a highly competitive program founded in 1950 by Hall of Fame Coach George Haines. A good student, despite the rigors of Olympic training, Burke made the Honor Roll as a Senior at Los Gatos High School for the Fall, 1959 semester. By January 1960, representing the Santa Clara Club at the San Jose AAU Open, Burke swam the 220-yard backstroke in 2:18.5, a new American record.

=== 1960 Rome Olympic medals ===
At the 1960 Olympic trials in Detroit, Burke broke the World Record in the 100-meter backstroke with a time of 1:09.2 which would be .1 seconds better than her 100-meter finals time at the Olympics.

She competed at the 1960 Summer Olympics in Rome, where she won the gold medal in women's 100-meter backstroke in a new Olympic record time of 1:09.3, becoming the first American woman to capture the event in 28 years. A heavy favorite in the 100-meter event, Lynn had broken the world record four times prior to the meet.

She won a second gold medal by swimming the backstroke leg for the winning U.S. team in the 4×100-meter medley relay, together with teammates Patty Kempner (breaststroke), Carolyn Schuler (butterfly), and Chris von Saltza (freestyle). The U.S. medley relay team set a new world record in the event final of 4:41.1.

After the Olympics, Burke was hailed by fellow New Yorkers at a large ticker tape parade down New York's Broadway.

In her career, Burke broke six World records, and lowered the 100 metre backstroke World record four times in just three months. Nationally, she broke seven American records, and captured six National National AAU titles.

== Life after swimming ==
Burke briefly attempted work as a swimming performer, giving swim exhibitions in August 1961, in the Mermaid Holiday Aqua Show in Westchester, New York, which also featured artistic diving.

=== St. John's University ===
Knowing she did not plan to swim during college, Burke attended New York City's St. John's University where she worked towards a Master's Degree in Elementary Education, graduating in June 1965. She was Captain of the school's Cheerleading squad, and served as a columnist for the student newspaper. She wrote a swimming instruction book after retiring from swimming, and attempted work as an actress in Manhattan for two years in the early 1960's. While at St. John's, she met her future husband John Peter Hederman, a Law Student, who would become a New York attorney. The couple married on June 15, 1966 in Long Island.

After graduation from St. John's, Burke taught second grade, and had spent summers teaching swimming to children at New York area country clubs. An American celebrity from her Olympic publicity, she had appeared in a few television commercials by the time of her college graduation.

Burke would alternately work as a model, author and business woman in New York. She has three children from her marriage to John Hederman.

In January 1984, while living in Laurel Hollow, New York, she served as a spokesperson for the Woman's Day Magazine's Olympic fund, whose purpose was to help partly cover the cost of training and housing Olympic athletes. Widowed at the age of 37, she spent much of her time raising her three children.

=== Honors ===
Burke was inducted into the International Swimming Hall of Fame as an "Honor Swimmer" in 1978.

== See also ==
- List of members of the International Swimming Hall of Fame
- List of Olympic medalists in swimming (women)
- World record progression 200 metres backstroke
- World record progression 4 × 100 metres medley relay
