= Garry Jones (cyclist) =

Australian cyclist (born 1940)

Personal information
- Born: 1 May 1940 (age 86) Australia

Cycling career
- Sport: Cycling

Garry Jones (born 1 May 1940) is an Australian former cyclist. He competed in three events at the 1960 Summer Olympics.
