= Ethel Ward Petersen =

Danish swimmer

Personal information
- Born: 6 August 1942 Hellerup, Denmark
- Died: June 2016 (age 73) Svendborg, Denmark

Sport
- Sport: Swimming

Ethel Ward Petersen (6 August 1942 - June 2016) is a Danish former swimmer. She competed in the women's 100 metre backstroke at the 1960 Summer Olympics.
