= Lynette Cooper =

Rhodesian swimmer (born 1944)

Personal information
- Born: 14 March 1944 (age 82) Cape Town, South Africa

Sport
- Sport: Swimming

Lynette Cooper (born 14 March 1944) is a Rhodesian former swimmer. She competed in two events for Rhodesia at the 1960 Summer Olympics.
