= Helga Schmidt-Neuber =

German swimmer (1937–2018)

Personal information
- Born: 19 February 1937 Ammendorf, Germany
- Died: 14 September 2018 (aged 81)

Sport
- Sport: Swimming

Helga Schmidt-Neuber (19 February 1937 – 14 September 2018) was a German swimmer. She competed at the 1956, 1960 and 1964 Summer Olympics.
