= Dottie Sutcliffe =

Rhodesian swimmer (born 1946)

Personal information
- Born: 27 August 1946 (age 79) Johannesburg, South Africa

Sport
- Sport: Swimming

Dottie Sutcliffe (born 27 August 1946) is a Rhodesian former swimmer. She competed in three events for Rhodesia at the 1960 Summer Olympics.
