= Alan Grindal =

Australian cyclist (born 1940)

Personal information
- Full name: Alan Joseph Grindal
- Born: 18 February 1940 (age 86) Australia

Cycling career
- Sport: Cycling

Alan Joseph Grindal (born 18 February 1940) is an Australian former cyclist. He competed in the individual road race and team time trial events at the 1960 Summer Olympics.
