= Rosemary Lassig =

Australian swimmer (1941–2017)

Personal information
- Full name: Rosemary Lassig
- National team: Australia
- Born: 10 August 1941 Bundaberg, Queensland
- Died: 1 November 2017 (aged 76) Sydney
- Height: 1.65 m (5 ft 5 in)
- Weight: 63 kg (139 lb)

Sport
- Sport: Swimming
- Strokes: breaststroke
Medal record
Women's swimming
Representing Australia
Olympic Games
Silver medal – second place	1960 Rome	4×100 m medley relay

Rosemary Lassig (10 August 1941 – 1 November 2017), known after marriage as Rosemary Lluka, was an Australian breaststroke swimmer of the 1960s, who won a silver medal in the 4×100-metre medley relay at the 1960 Summer Olympics in Rome. Lassig combined with Dawn Fraser, Jan Andrew and Marilyn Wilson to register a silver medal in the 4×100-metre medley relay five seconds behind the winners, the United States. In her only individual event, the 200-metre breaststroke, she did not advance beyond the preliminary heats.

Lassig, who was born in Bundaberg, Queensland, died in Sydney on 1 November 2017 due to complications caused by Alzheimer's disease.

== See also ==
- List of Olympic medalists in swimming (women)
