= Hillary Wilson =

Rhodesian swimmer (born 1945)

Personal information
- Born: 3 April 1945 (age 81) Pretoria, South Africa

Sport
- Sport: Swimming

Hillary Wilson (born 3 April 1945) is a Rhodesian former swimmer. She competed in three events for Rhodesia at the 1960 Summer Olympics. go ahead
