= Ingrid Schmidt =

East German swimmer (1945–2023)

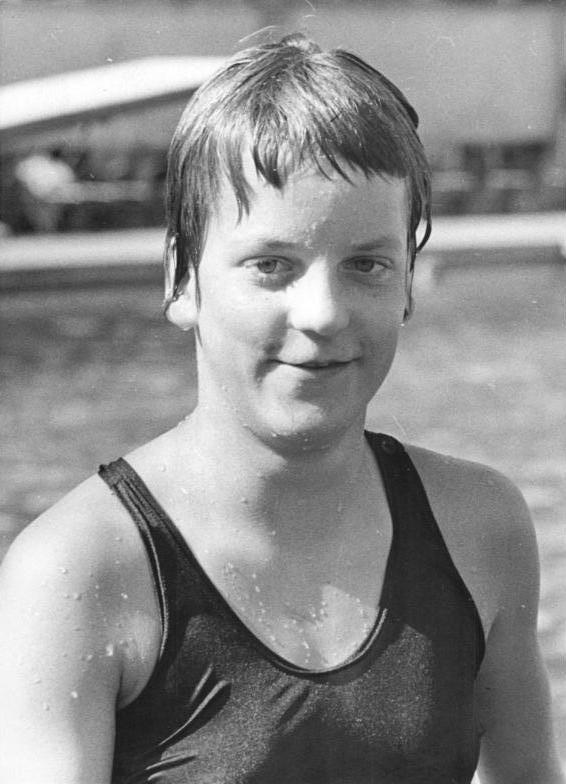
- Schmidt in 1963

Personal information
- Born: 3 March 1945 Rudolstadt, Germany
- Died: 6 August 2023 (aged 78) Zimmern ob Rottweil, Baden-Württemberg, Germany
- Height: 1.72 m (5 ft 8 in)
- Weight: 60 kg (132 lb)

Sport
- Sport: Swimming
- Club: BSG Einheit Greiz; SC DHfK Leipzig
Medal record
Women's swimming
Representing East Germany
Olympic Games
Bronze medal – third place	1960 Rome	4×100 m medley
European Championships
Gold medal – first place	1962 Leipzig	4×100 m medley

Ingrid Schmidt (3 March 1945 – 6 August 2023) was a German backstroke swimmer. She competed at the 1960 and 1964 Summer Olympics and won a bronze medal in the 4 × 100 m medley relay in 1960. In 1964 her team was disqualified in the same event.

At the 1962 European Aquatics Championships, she won a gold medal in the same 4 × 100 m medley event, setting the new world record. For this achievement, the four team members were named German Sportspersonalities of the Year in the team category in 1962.

Schmidt died in Zimmern ob Rottweil on 6 August 2023, at the age of 78.
