= Marianne Heemskerk =

Dutch swimmer (born 1944)

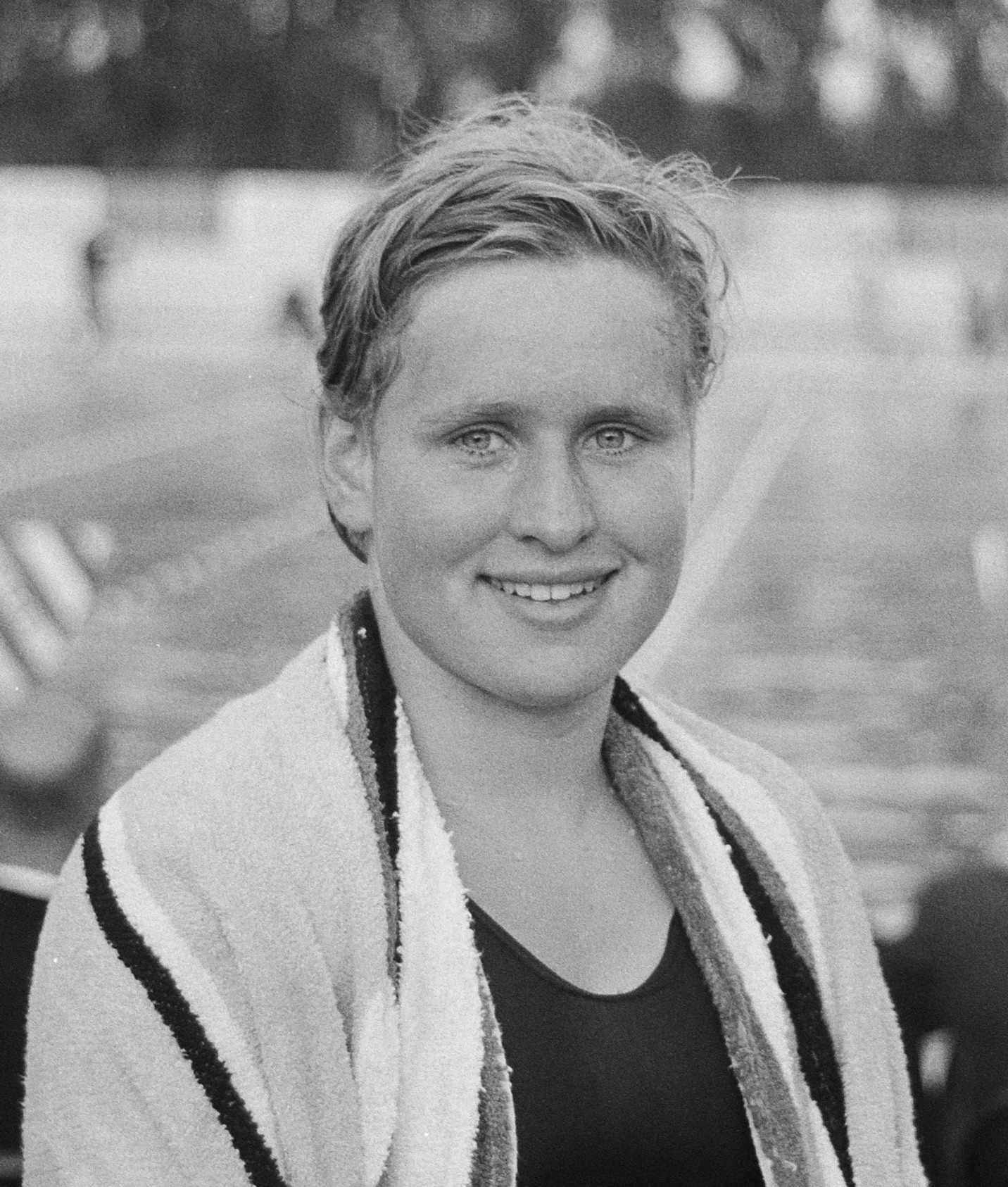
- Marianne Heemskerk in 1960

Medal record

Women's Swimming

Representing the Netherlands

Olympic Games
Silver medal – second place	1960 Rome	100 m butterfly

European Championships
Bronze medal – third place	1962 Leipzig	100 m butterfly

Marianne Yvonne Heemskerk (born 28 August 1944 in Rotterdam, South Holland) is a former butterfly swimmer from the Netherlands, who won the silver medal in the 100 m butterfly at the 1960 Summer Olympics in Rome, Italy. She was also part of the 4 × 100 m medley relay team that finished fourth. She also participated in the 1964 Summer Olympics but did not reach the finals. Heemskerk broke the world record in the women's 200m butterfly on 12 June 1960 in Leipzig, East Germany.

Records
Preceded by (United States) Becky Collins	Women's 200 metre butterfly world record holder (long course); 12 June 1960 – 13 August 1961	Succeeded by (United States) Becky Collins
