= Larisa Viktorova =

Russian swimmer

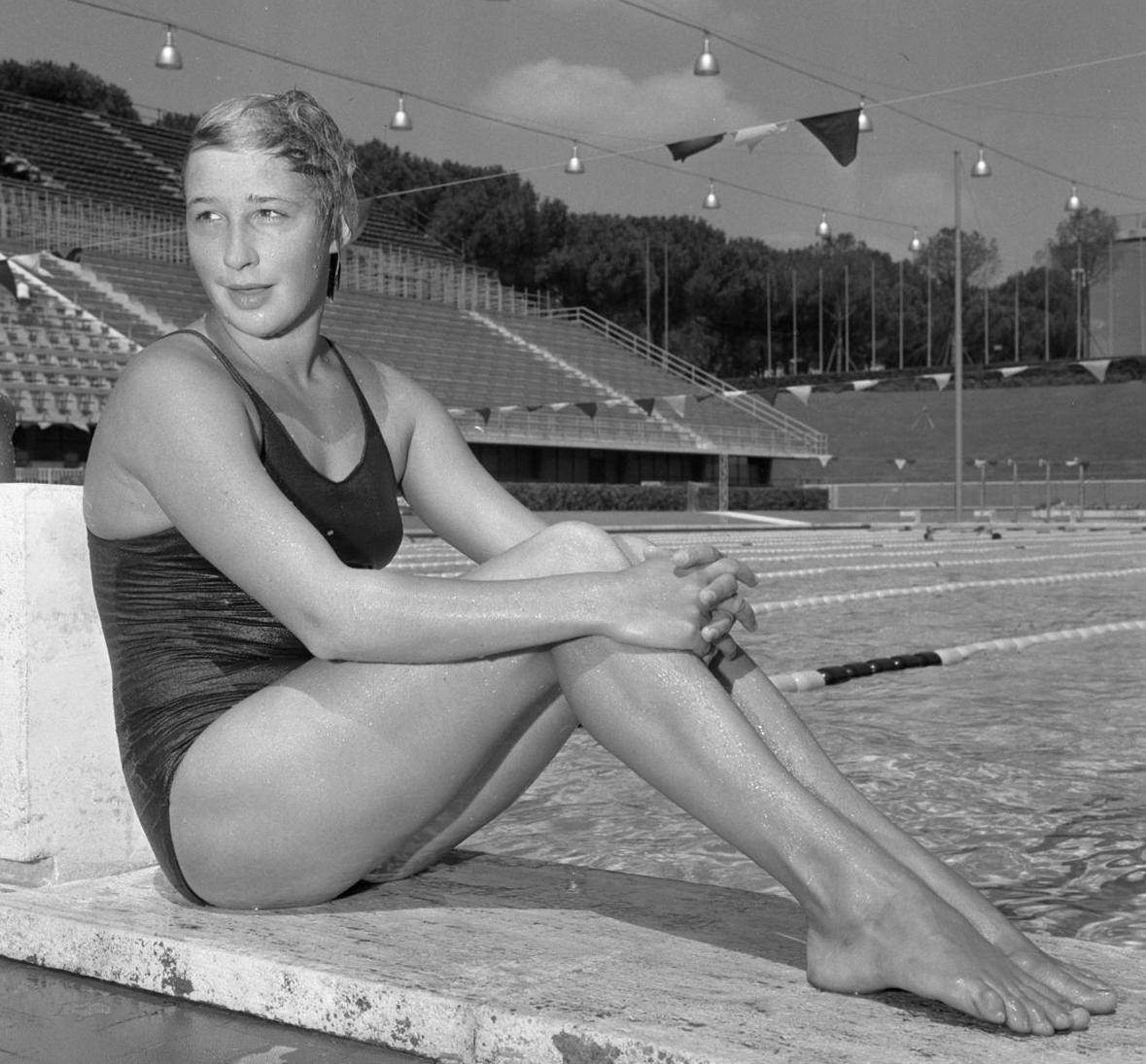
- Larisa Viktorovaat the 1960 Olympics

Personal information
- Born: 5 September 1943 (age 82) Leningrad, Russian SFSR, Soviet Union
- Height: 170 cm (5 ft 7 in)
- Weight: 64 kg (141 lb)

Sport
- Sport: Swimming
- Club: Burevestnik St. Petersburg
Medal record
Representing the Soviet Union
European Championships
Silver medal – second place	1958 Budapest	4×100 m medley
Bronze medal – third place	1958 Budapest	100 m backstroke
Summer Universiade
Gold medal – first place	1961 Sofia	100 m backstroke

Larisa Viktorovna Viktorova (Russian: Лариса Викторовна Викторова; born 5 September 1943) is a retired Russian swimmer who won two medals at the 1958 European Aquatics Championships. She also participated in the 1960 Summer Olympics and finished eighth in the 4 × 100 m medley event. Between 1958 and 1964 she set 21 national records and won 15 medals at national championships (8 gold), in backstroke, freestyle and medley relay events. After retirement she worked at the Baikal-Amur Mainline and as a swimming coach. In the 1990s she moved to the United States.
