= Rosy Piacentini =

French swimmer

Personal information
- Full name: Rose-Marie Piacentini
- Nationality: French
- Born: 17 August 1938 (age 88) Paris, France

Sport
- Sport: Swimming

Rose-Marie "Rosy" Piacentini (born 17 August 1938) is a French former backstroke swimmer. She competed in two events at the 1960 Summer Olympics.
