= Davenport (surname) =

- Pronunciation: /ˈdævənpɔːrt/
- Language: English

Origin
- Languages: 1.Welsh, Old English; 2.Irish
- Origin: 1. dafnu + port 2. Ó Donndubhartaigh
- Meaning: 1. 'to drop' and 'market town' 2. 'descendant of Donndubhartach'
- Region of origin: Cheshire

Davenport is a surname coming from an estate with the same name. It could be also an Anglicized Irish surname. It may refer to:

== A ==
- Abraham Davenport (1715–1789), American politician
- A'keria C. Davenport (born 1988), American drag queen
- Alan Garnett Davenport (1932–2009), Canadian wind engineer
- Alice Davenport (1864–1936), American film actress
- Andrew Davenport (born 1965), English writer, puppeteer, producer, co-creator and writer of Teletubbies
- Arthur Davenport (disambiguation)
- Ashley Davenport (1794–1874), New York state senator

== B ==
- Bernard Davenport (1939–2018), Irish ambassador
- Bill Davenport (1906–2001), American footballer
- Billy Davenport (1931–1999), American drummer
- Bishop Davenport (born 2003), American football player

== C ==
- Calum Davenport (born 1983), English footballer
- Charles Davenport (1866–1944), American biologist and eugenicist
- Christopher Davenport (1598–1680), English Catholic theologian
- Claire Davenport (1933–2002), English actress
- Clay Davenport, American baseball statistician
- Clyde Davenport (1921–2020), American folk musician

== D ==
- Derrick Davenport (born 1978), American male model
- Dorothy Davenport (embroiderer) (1561–1639), English embroiderer
- Dorothy Davenport (1895–1977), American actress, screenwriter and film director
- Doris Davenport (1917–1980), American actress
- Doug Davenport (born c. 1988), American basketball coach, son of Scott

== E ==
- Ed. J. Davenport (1899–1953), Los Angeles City Council member
- Edward Davenport (fraudster) (1966–) also known as "(Lord) Fast Eddie", convicted English fraudster and property developer
- Edward Loomis Davenport (1816–1877), American actor
- Emily Davenport, American inventor

== F ==
- Fanny Davenport (1850–1898), English-born American stage actress
- Francis William Davenport (1847–1925), English composer and music professor
- Franklin Davenport (1755–1832), American politician
- Frederick M. Davenport (1866–1956), American politician

== G ==
- Gail Davenport (born 1949), American politician
- George Davenport (1783–1845), American frontiersman, trader and US Army colonel; Davenport, Iowa, was named in his honor
- George Davenport (1860–1902), English first-class cricketer
- Gertrude Crotty Davenport (1866–1946), American biologist and eugenicist
- Glorianna Davenport, documentary filmmaker and researcher
- Guy Davenport (1927–2005), American writer, intellectual, and teacher

== H ==
- Harold Davenport (1907–1969), British mathematician
- Harriett Davenport (1899–1953), Los Angeles City Council member
- Harry Davenport (1866–1949), American film actor
- Harry J. Davenport (1902–1977), American politician
- Harry Davenport (1833–1895), English politician
- Hayes Davenport (1986-), American homelessness activist
- Herbert J. Davenport (1861–1931), American economist
- Hester Davenport (1642–1717), English stage actress
- Homer Davenport (1867–1912), American political cartoonist
- Honey Davenport (born 1985), American drag queen
- Hugh Bromley-Davenport (1870–1954), English cricketer

== I ==
- Ian Davenport (artist) (born 1960), English painter
- Ira Davenport (politician) (1841–1904), American politician
- Ira Davenport (athlete) (1887–1941), American athlete and football player
- Isaiah Davenport (1784–1827), American master builder

== J ==
- Jack Davenport (born 1973), British actor
- Jack A. Davenport (1931–1951), United States Marine Medal of Honor recipient
- James Davenport (clergyman) (1716–1757), American clergyman
- James Davenport (Connecticut politician) (1756–1797), American lawyer and politician
- James C. Davenport (born 1938), American physicist
- James H. Davenport (born 1953), British computer scientist and mathematician
- Jean Margaret Davenport (1829–1903), Anglo-American actress
- Jessica Davenport (born 1985), American basketball player
- Jim Davenport (1933–2016), American baseball player and manager
- John Davenport (minister) (1597–1670), Puritan clergyman and one of the founders of New Haven, Connecticut
- John Davenport (orientalist) (1789 – 1877), British orientalist and writer
- John Edwin Davenport (born 1928), American politician
- Julién Davenport (born 1995), American football player

== K ==
- Kennedy Davenport, a contestant on RuPaul's Drag Race
- Kenny Davenport (1862–1908), English footballer
- Kiana Davenport, American-Hawaiian author
- Kim Davenport (born 1955), American professional pool player

== L ==
- Lindsay Davenport (born 1976), American female professional tennis player
- Louis Davenport (1869–1951), American businessman
- Lucy Davenport, British actress

== M ==
- Madison Davenport (born 1996), American actress and singer
- Marcia Davenport (1903–1996), American author and music critic
- Marcus Davenport (born 1996), American football player
- Mary Ann Davenport (1759–1843), English actress
- Marmaduke Davenport, pseudonym for British confidence trickster Alexander Day
- Mike Davenport (born 1968), American musician
- Milla Davenport (1871–1936), stage and film actress
- Millia Davenport (1895–1992), American costumer, theater designer, and scholar
- Miriam Davenport (1915–1999), American painter and sculptor

== N ==
- Najeh Davenport (born 1979), American footballer
- N'Dea Davenport (born 1966), American R&B/soul singer/songwriter
- Nigel Davenport (1928–2013), British actor

== P ==
- Paul Davenport (born 1946), 9th president of the University of Western Ontario
- Peter Davenport (born 1961), former English professional footballer

== R ==
- Richard Davenport-Hines (born 1953), British writer
- Robert Davenport (fl. 1623–1639), English dramatist
- Robert Davenport (Royal Navy officer) (1882–1965), British admiral
- Robert Davenport (Australian politician) (1816–1896), pioneer of South Australia, brother of Samuel
- Ross Davenport (born 1984), British swimmer
- Roy M. Davenport (1909–1987), United States Navy Rear Admiral, 5-time recipient of the Navy Cross
- Russell Davenport (1899–1954), American publisher and writer

== S ==
- Samuel Davenport (disambiguation)
- Samuel Davenport (Australian politician) (1818–1906), South Australian pioneer and parliamentarian
- Samuel Arza Davenport (1834–1911), American politician
- Scott Davenport (born c. 1957), American basketball coach
- Stanley Woodward Davenport (1861–1921), American politician
- Stuart Davenport (born 1962), New Zealand squash player
- Sahara Davenport (1984–2012), a past contestant of Rupaul's Drag Race

== T ==
- Thomas Davenport (inventor) (1802–1851), blacksmith from Vermont, US who was an inventor of DC electric motors
- Thomas Davenport (congressman) (died 1838), US representative from Virginia
- Thomas H. Davenport (born 1954), American academic

== W ==
- Wilbur Davenport (1920–2003), American communications engineer and MIT professor
- Wallace Davenport (1925–2004), American jazz trumpeter
- Willie Davenport (1943–2002), American athlete
- William Davenport (filmmaker) (born 1960), filmmaker and autism activist
- William Davenport (scientist) (1772–1824), Irish academic and clergyman
- William Bromley-Davenport (1821–1884), British MP for Warwickshire North
- William Bromley-Davenport (1862–1949), British soldier, footballer and Conservative politician
- Winifred Davenport (1924–2003), Australian marine and civil engineer
- Wink Davenport (1942–2022), American former volleyball player

== Z ==
- Zavion Michael Davenport (1985–2020), American drag queen known as Chi Chi DeVayne

== Brothers ==
- Davenport Brothers (Ira Erastus and William Henry), noted frauds of spiritualism

== See also ==
- Davenport (disambiguation)
- Bromley-Davenport
- Davenport, fictional family from the British television soap Family Affairs
