= Rowing at the 1960 Summer Olympics – Men's double sculls =

Men's double sculls at the Games of the XVII Olympiad
- Date: 31 August – 3 September 1960
- Competitors: 32 from 16 nations

Medalists
1st place, gold medalist(s)		Václav Kozák; Pavel Schmidt	Czechoslovakia
2nd place, silver medalist(s)		Aleksandr Berkutov; Yuriy Tyukalov	Soviet Union
3rd place, bronze medalist(s)		Ernst Hürlimann; Rolf Larcher	Switzerland

The men's double sculls competition at the 1960 Summer Olympics took place at took place at Lake Albano, Italy.

== Competition format ==
This rowing competition consisted of two main rounds (heats and final), as well as a repechage round that allowed teams that did not win their heats to advance to the final. All races were 2,000 metres in distance.

- Heats: Three heats. With 16 boats entered, there were five or six boats per heat. The winner of each heat advanced directly to the final; all other boats went to the repechage.
- Repechage: Three heats. With 13 boats racing in but not winning their initial heats, there were four or five boats per repechage heat. The top boat in each repechage heat advanced to the final, with the remaining boats eliminated.
- Final: The final consisted of the six boats that had won either the preliminary heats or the repechage heats.

== Results ==
=== Heats ===
==== Heat 1 ====
Rank	Rowers	Nation	Time	Notes
1	René Duhamel; Bernard Monnereau	France	6:45.23	Q
2	Peter Bakker; Co Rentmeester	Netherlands	6:48.22	R
3	Joža Lovec; Perica Vlašić	Yugoslavia	6:49.94	R
4	John B. Kelly Jr.; Bill Knecht	United States	6:51.92	R
5	Heinz Becher; Günter Schroers	United Team of Germany	6:52.05	R
6	Ian Tutty; Kevyn Webb	Australia	7:16.41	R

==== Heat 2 ====
Rank	Rowers	Nation	Time	Notes
1	Václav Kozák; Pavel Schmidt	Czechoslovakia	6:51.47	Q
2	Aleksandr Berkutov; Yuriy Tyukalov	Soviet Union	6:51.98	R
3	Nicholas Birkmyre; George Justicz	Great Britain	7:00.13	R
4	Harald Kråkenes; Sverre Kråkenes	Norway	7:11.04	R
5	Jannik Madum Andersen; Poul Mortensen	Denmark	7:15.23	R

==== Heat 3 ====
Italy was disqualified for false starting twice.

Rank	Rowers	Nation	Time	Notes
1	Ernst Hürlimann; Rolf Larcher	Switzerland	6:54.78	Q
2	Gérard Higny; Jean-Marie Lemaire	Belgium	6:55.31	R
3	Gottfried Dittrich; Adolf Löblich	Austria	7:18.13	R
4	Paulo Carvalho; Mariano Caulín	Uruguay	7:38.57	R
–	Severino Lucini; Cesarino Pestuggia	Italy	DSQ	R

=== Repechage ===
==== Repechage heat 1 ====
Rank	Rowers	Nation	Time	Notes
1	Peter Bakker; Co Rentmeester	Netherlands	6:51.61	Q
2	Harald Kråkenes; Sverre Kråkenes	Norway	7:02.88	
3	Jannik Madum Andersen; Poul Mortensen	Denmark	7:09.95	
4	Gottfried Dittrich; Adolf Löblich	Austria	7:15.63	

==== Repechage heat 2 ====
Rank	Rowers	Nation	Time	Notes
1	Aleksandr Berkutov; Yuriy Tyukalov	Soviet Union	6:55.91	Q
2	Paulo Carvalho; Mariano Caulín	Uruguay	7:04.78	
3	Joža Lovec; Perica Vlašić	Yugoslavia	7:07.61	
4	Severino Lucini; Cesarino Pestuggia	Italy	7:08.16	
5	Ian Tutty; Kevyn Webb	Australia	7:12.37	

==== Repechage heat 3 ====
Rank	Rowers	Nation	Time	Notes
1	Gérard Higny; Jean-Marie Lemaire	Belgium	6:49.04	Q
2	Nicholas Birkmyre; George Justicz	Great Britain	6:49.81	
3	Heinz Becher; Günter Schroers	United Team of Germany	6:55.15	
4	John B. Kelly Jr.; Bill Knecht	United States	6:55.25	

=== Final ===
Rank	Rowers	Nation	Time
1st place, gold medalist(s)	Václav Kozák; Pavel Schmidt	Czechoslovakia	6:47.50
2nd place, silver medalist(s)	Aleksandr Berkutov; Yuriy Tyukalov	Soviet Union	6:50.49
3rd place, bronze medalist(s)	Ernst Hürlimann; Rolf Larcher	Switzerland	6:50.59
4	René Duhamel; Bernard Monnereau	France	6:52.22
5	Peter Bakker; Co Rentmeester	Netherlands	6:53.86
6	Gérard Higny; Jean-Marie Lemaire	Belgium	6:56.40
