= Löblich =

Löblich or Loeblich is a German surname, meaning "laudable" or "commendable". Notable people with the surname Löblich include:

- Adolf Löblich (born 1938), Austrian rower
- Alfred R. Loeblich Jr (1914–1994), American micropaleontologist
- Helen Niña Tappan Loeblich (1917–2004), American micropaleontologist geologist
- Maximilian Leopold Loeblich (1901–1984), Austrian entrepreneur, coppersmith, engineer

== See also ==
- Löblich & Co.
