= 1990 Queen's Birthday Honours (Australia) =

The 1990 Queen's Birthday Honours for Australia were announced on Monday 11 June 1990 by the office of the Governor-General.

The Birthday Honours were appointments by some of the 16 Commonwealth realms of Queen Elizabeth II to various orders and honours to reward and highlight good works by citizens of those countries. The Birthday Honours are awarded as part of the Queen's Official Birthday celebrations during the month of June.

== Order of Australia ==
=== Companion (AC) ===
==== General Division ====
Recipient	Citation	Notes
His Excellency Archbishop Edward Idris Cassidy	For service to the religion and to international affairs	
Dr Basil Stuart Hetzel	For service to Australian and world health, particularly in the field of human nutrition	
George Howard Michell	For service to the wool industry and to the arts	
Emeritus Professor Nancy Fannie Millis, MBE	For service to science, particularly in the field of microbiology and its application to industry	
Professor Lawrie William Powell	For service to medicine and medical research, particularly in the field of gastroenterology and liver disease	
Sir Nicholas (Michael) Shehadie, OBE	For service to the media, to sport and to the community	
Emeritus Professor John Jamieson Carswell Smart	For service to education, particularly in the field of philosophy	
The Honourable John Halden Wootten, QC	For service to human rights, to conservation, to legal education and to the law	
Sir David (Ronald) Zeidler, CBE	For service to science and technology, to business and to the community	

=== Officer (AO) ===
==== General Division ====
Recipient	Citation	Notes
David Charles Keith Allen	For service to the natural gas industry	
Graeme Emerson Bell, MBE	For service to music, particularly jazz	
Dr Joseph Brown, OBE	For service to the community and the arts	
Professor John Ralph Burton	For service to resource engineering, particularly in the field of resource management education	
Margaret Frances Carnegie, OAM	For service to art, literature and to local history	
The Honourable Joan Child	For service to the Australian Parliament	
Dr John Law Farrands, CB	For service to science and technology	
Thomas Brian Finn	For service to business, to industry and to education	
James Timothy Gleeson, AM	For service to art	
Associate Professor Yasmine Gooneratne	For service to literature and to education	
John Bernard Gough, OBE	For service to industry	
Dr Gavan Griffith, QC	For public service as Commonwealth Solicitor General	
Marjorie Jackson-Nelson, MBE	For service to community health and to sport	
Professor Geoffrey Milton Kellerman	For service to medical education, particularly in the field of biochemical research	
Dr Elizabeth Nesta Marks	For service to science, particularly in the field of entomology	
Frederick William Millar, CBE	For service to business and commerce and to the arts	
Professor James Douglas Morrison	For service to science, particularly in the field of physical chemistry, and to education	
Robert Outterside	For service to education	
Keith William Pearson	For public service	
Emeritus Professor Alfred Hurlstone Pollard	For service to business, particularly in the field of accountancy, and to the community	
Jennifer Joan Ross	For service to community health, particularly in the field of haemophilia	
The Honourable Susan Maree Ryan	For service to the Australian Parliament	
Reverend Dr John Fraser Scott	For service to learning	
The Honourable Justice Ian Fitzharding Sheppard	For service to higher education and to the law	
Victor Smorgon	For service to art, particularly as a benefactor	
Loti Smorgon	For service to art, particularly as a benefactor and fund raiser	
Kenneth Charles Taeuber	For public service	
John Casey Taylor	For public service	
Associate Professor Gillian Turner	For service to medicine, particularly in the field of genetics	
Wlodzimierz Wojak, MBE	For service to multiculturalism and ethnic affairs	

==== Military Division ====
Branch	Recipient	Citation	Notes
Navy	Rear Admiral Anthony Michael Carwardine, AM	For service to the Royal Australian Navy, particularly as the Assistant Chief of Naval Staff (Personnel)	
Army	Major General John Stuart Baker, AM	For service to the Australian Army, particularly as Director Joint Intelligence Organisation	
Air Force	Air Vice-Marshal Brian John Graf	For service to the Royal Australian Air Force as Assistant Chief of the Air Staff – Materiel	
Air Force	Air Commodore Thomas William O'Brien, AFC	For service to the Royal Australian Air Force as Chief of Staff Air Headquarters	

=== Member (AM) ===
==== General Division ====
Recipient	Citation	Notes
Elizabeth Anne Alexander	For services to accountancy	
Peter Richard Woolnough Allen	For service to the performing arts, particularly as a song writer	
Christopher Raymond Banks	For service to the housing industry and the community	
Norman James Barton	For service to the sport of gliding	
Dr Victor David Bear	For service to medicine, particularly in the field of otolaryngology	
Leon Joseph Becker	For service to the media and the community	
Percival James Bell	For service to horse racing, particularly as Chairman of the Australian Jockey Club	
Councillor Herbert Ross Boucher	For service to the community and local government	
John Anthony Guy Brand	For service to architecture, particularly in the field of planning	
Richard Edwin Brett	For service to the electrical and electronic industries	
John Linton Briggs	For service to apiculture	
Dr Robert Hallows Brown	For service to manufacturing engineering	
Margaret Alison Cameron	For service to library services, education and to ornithology	
Ronald Patrick Casey, MBE	For service to community health and sport	
Elizabeth Ann Churcher	For service to the arts, particularly in the field of arts administration and education	
Dr Thomas Joseph Claffey	For service to medicine, particularly in the field of orthopaedic surgery	
Maxwell Graham Coghlan	For service to education in the field of financial administration	
Dr Peter Langtree Colville	For service to medicine, particularly in the field of rehabilitation and severe disability management	
Associate Professor Graham George Craig	For service to dentistry	
Brother Kevin Thomas Cunningham	For service to religion and education	
John Victor Daniell	For service to the film and television industry	
Marjory Winifred Davenport	For service to marine and civil engineering	
The Honourable Ronald Davies	For service to the Western Australian Parliament and to the community	
Clyde Kenneth Dickens	For service to accountancy	
Ernest Ashly Dingo	For service to the performing arts	
Frances Hazel Donovan	For service to social work education and social welfare	
Michael Philip Dudman	For service to music, particularly as an organist	
Chief Magistrate John Milton Dugan	For service to the law	
Wilfred Francis Ellis	For service to marine engineering and to naval architecture	
Mancel Rose Ellis Robinson	For service to education, particularly for children with learning disabilities	
Edward Eugene Falk, OBE	For service to small business	
Patricia Edith Feilman	For service to the community	
Norman Graham Freudenberg	For service to journalism, to parliament and to politics	
Ellie Joan Gaffney	For service to the community, particularly the Aboriginal and Torres Strait Islander communities	
Maureen Gilmartin	For service to the community through Catholic women's organisations	
John Edward Graham	For service to the housing industry	
Robert Geoffrey Hewett Green	For service to conservation and the environment	
Marjorie Fay Groves	For service to netball	
Rodney Hall	For service to the arts, particularly in the field of literature	
Dr June Wanda Halliday	For service to medical science, particularly in the field of biochemical research	
Norman James Halse	For public service and for service to agriculture	
George Edward Hams	For public service, particularly in the field of telecommunications	
Dr Douglas Hardy	For service to medicine	
Ronald James Hesford	For service to agriculture, and to the community	
Rex Kelvin Hobcroft	For service to music	
Clifford Henry Hocking	For service to the arts and to entertainment	
James Colin Hoskin	For service to education, particularly as Headmaster, James Ruse Agriculture High School and to the community	
Phyllis Deirdre Hyland	For service to netball	
Gillian Hilma James	For service to the Tasmanian Parliament and to the community	
Levaun Mary Jarvis	For service to the community	
The Honourable Leslie Royston Johnson	For service to the Australian Parliament, for public service, and for service to the Aboriginal community	
Richard Colin Johnson	For public service, particularly in the field of satellite communications	
Gerasimos Karidis	For service to the building and construction industry and for service to the Greek community	
Brian James Kidd	For service to architecture and design, particularly for the needs of those with physical disabilities and the frail aged	
Ethel Marion Lane, MBE	For service to the community, particularly in the field of veterans' welfare	
Reverend Canon Alan Arthur Langdon	For service to education, particularly in the field of Christian education	
Malcolm MacGregor Baxter Latham	For service to architecture, particularly in the field of town planning	
Clemens Theodor Leske	For service to music	
William Barrie Lewis	For service to local government	
Peter Nicholas Manettas	For service to the seafood export industry and to the Greek community	
Commissioner Norman James Mansini	For service to industrial relations	
Keith Douglas Marshall	For service to industrial relations	
Reverend George Stanley Martin, MBE	For service to the community, particularly in the field of social welfare	
Angela Anne-Marie McAvoy	For service to the community, particularly as Founder President of the Australian Crohn's and Colitis Association	
Peter Boyce Meulman	For public service, particularly in the field of telecommunications	
Edna Isabel Mills	For service to education	
Necia Joy Mocatta	For service to the community, particularly in the field of women's affairs	
Eileen Margaret Pearce (Sister Victoire)	For service to nursing, particularly in the field of palliative care	
Michael Laurence Peck	For service to architecture, particularly in the field of education	
Lawrence Vincent Pedemont	For service to the community, particularly as member and president of the St Vincent de Paul Society of New South Wales	
Edward Esben Petersen	For service to the community, particularly with the Royal Victorian Institute for the Blind	
Dr Bruce Henry Peterson, MC	For service to medicine, particularly in the field of PSYCHIATRY, and to the community	
Ivor Lennox Pinkerton	For service to civil engineering	
Riccardo Pisaturo	For service to the cattle industry	
Dr John Victor Possingham	For service to science, particularly in the field of horticultural research	
Barbara Mary Potter	For service to the community particularly in the field of aged welfare	
Valerie Pratt	For service to the community, particularly in the field of employment for women	
Allan Francis Rainbird	For public service	
Harold Adolphe Seeley	For service to industry	
James Glen Service	For service to the community	
The Reverend Father Richard Daniel Shanahan	For service to religion and to the community	
Tonia Louise Shand	For public service	
Dr Anthony James Shinkfield	For service to education, particularly as Headmaster, St Peter's College, Adelaide	
Robert George Smith, OAM	For service to tourism, particularly through West Coast Pioneers Museum	
Brother Walter Austin Smith	For service to education	
Associate Professor Deane Oakford Southgate	For service to medicine, particularly in the field of occupational health and safety	
Andrew McDonald Taylor	For service to the arts, particularly in the field of literature	
His Honour Judge Barrie Ronald Thorley	For service to the law and to rugby football	
John Kevin Charles Twigden	For service to primary industry, to local government and to the community	
Vincent Volpe	For service to the Italian community	
Gloria Dawn Walley	For service to the Aboriginal community	
Robert Bruce Whan	For service to primary industry and to the community	

==== Military Division ====
Branch	Recipient	Citation	Notes
Navy	Lieutenant Commander Rimgaudas Adolfas Diciunas	For service to the Royal Australian Navy, particularly in the field of Marine Engineering while serving in HMAS Brisbane	
Navy	Commander Denis William Mole	For service to the Royal Australian Navy, particularly to the Submarine Arm	
Navy	Captain Geoffrey Athol Rose	For service to the Royal Australian Navy as Project Manager, New Submarine Project	
Army	Major Geoffrey William Carson	For service to the Australian Army in the field of education	
Army	Brigadier Stephen Newman Gower	For service to the Australian Army as the Commandant, Joint Services Staff College and Director General, Public Information	
Army	Brigadier Terence Henry Holland	For service to the Australian Army and to the Australian Defence Force as the Australian Defence Attaché, Indonesia	
Army	Lieutenant Colonel Peter John Johnson	For service to the Australian Army in the field of logistics	
Army	Brigadier Graeme John Loughton	For service to the Australian Army as Controller of Supply at Headquarters Logistic Command	
Army	Lieutenant Colonel Robert George Martin, RFD	For service to the Australian Army as For service to the Australian Army as Commanding Officer of the 1st/19th Battalion, The Royal New South Wales Regiment	
Army	Major Bruce Munchenberg	For service to the Australian Army as the Officer Commanding, The Royal Military College Band	
Army	Colonel Peter Andrew Sibree	For service to the Australian Army as Commandant of the Infantry Centre and Commander Singleton Military Area	
Army	Colonel Richard Douglas Warren	For service to the Australian Army as the initial Commander of the Australian Contingent United Nations Transition Assistance Group, Namibia	
Air Force	Squadron Leader Allan Peter Griffith	For service to the Royal Australian Air Force as Facilities Officer Base Squadron Tindal	
Air Force	Group Captain David John Leach, AFC	For service to the Royal Australian Air Force as the RAAF Commander Northern Area	
Air Force	Wing Commander Douglas William Peak	For service to the Royal Australian Air Force as Commanding Officer Movement Coordination Centre	
Air Force	Squadron Leader Gordon Ian Petkoff	For service to the Royal Australian Air Force as the Integration and Software Flight Commander at No 292 Squadron RAAF Edinburgh	
Air Force	Flight Lieutenant David Weaver	For service to the Royal Australian Air Force as the project director of the Geographic Information System at the Central Photographic Establishment	

=== Medal (OAM) ===
==== General Division ====
Recipient	Citation	Notes
Dr Warwick Leslie Adams	For service to medicine and to the community	
Brian Walter Adams	For service to the arts and entertainment industry	
Eric John Ahern	For service to the veterans	
Arnold Neils Andersen	For service to the community	
Anthony Peter Annear	For service to lapidary	
Alejandro Arellano	For service to the Spanish community	
Colonel Jack Neville Lucas Argent, OBE ED	For service to rugby league football and to veterans	
Peter Emanuel Aroney	For service to the Greek community	
Jennifer Lesley Ashton	For service to the provision of aid and relief programmes in developing countries	
Reginald Austin	For service to athletics, particularly sprinting	
Frank Baguley	For service to horticulture, particularly through the Victorian Flower Growers Association	
John Michael Baker	For service to the sport of cricket	
Judith Anne Bauer	For service to music	
Irene Jessie May Bell	For service to women's affairs	
Edward William Benson	For service to the community	
Harold Lesley Bingham, BEM	For service to the Cocos (Keeling) Islands Malay community	
The Reverend Reginald Gray Birch	For service to the Australian Inland Mission	
Lawrence Sydney Black	For service to veterans	
Peter Adam Black	For service to the cattle industry and local government	
Mary Anne Bond	For service to youth employment schemes and to people with disabilities	
John Booth	For service to the Public Service and to migrant assistance	
Roy Willan Bostock	For service to the community and local government	
Victor John Brown	For service to the community	
Dr Francis Esmond Browne	For service to community health	
James Burrowes	For service to the Royal Life Saving Society of Victoria	
Meryl Olive Burton	For service to the community, particularly through the Red Cross	
Kevin Leslie Buttsworth	For service to veterans and to the Queensland Ambulance Transport Brigade	
Nancy Lorna Bynon	For service to the community and to the aged	
Sister Mary Alcantara Byrne	For service to nursing	
James Archibald Hunter Cameron	For service to scouting	
Athanasia Nancy Caruana	For service to the arts and promotion of Greek culture	
Enid May Channon	For service to the community	
John William Clarke	For service to youth and to community through the Uniting Church	
Trevor Keith Colquhoun	For service to the community	
Margaret Elaine Considine	For service to hospital administration	
Laurence Henry Copping	For service to children's literature	
Stanley Alfred Cottier	For service to the conservation and the environment	
Leslie Robert Crawford	For service to the community, particularly through the Berry Silver Band	
Joan Mavwin Cross	For service to athletics administration	
Vivian Lennon Dagg	For service to veterans and to people with disabilities	
Lily Catherine Margaret Dale	For service to the Royal Life Saving Society	
Thelma Rosabel Daniel	For service to the visually impaired	
Joan Mary Deans	For service to nursing	
Councillor John Francis Deppeler	For service to the community and local government	
Allison Winning Dickson	For service to the community and tertiary education	
Ruth Campion Dircks	For service to science education	
Shaun Patrick Dobson	For service to veterans	
Charles Hoani Scott Dolling	For service to primary industry, particularly sheep and wool production	
Zelda Doon	For service to the community	
Doris Nellie Duncan	For service to the fostering of international communities and for services to children	
John Raymond Dyer	For service to the sport of Australian rules football	
Ronald Alec Elgar	For service to the public service	
Clive Lindsay Fairbairn	For service to the sport of cricket	
Ronald Peter Falla	For service to the community and to the preservation of local history	
Ronald Charles Ferrier	For service to the community and to music	
Councillor John David Livingstone Field	For service to the community and to local government	
Alfred Thomas Fogarty	For service to the coal mining industry and to the community	
Joyce Fren	For service to the community, particularly through Quota International	
Margaret Anne Gadsby	For service to the Royal Life Saving Society	
Bertram Clifford Gallard	For service to the welfare of children and the aged	
Dr Richard Banks Geeves	For service to the community, particularly the welfare of the aged	
Gwenyth Ora George	For service to the aged, particularly through the Spiral Club	
Joan Diana Gillespie	For service to conservation particularly through the Royal Zoological Society of South Australia	
Sister Winifred Jill Goddard	For service to the community particularly through child health services	
Alan Murray Graham	For service to the community and to tourism	
Heather Dorothy Gray	For service to the care of the aged and to people with intellectual disabilities	
Edward John Grinpukel	For service to local government and to the community	
Bertie Bryce Gunning	For service to local government and to primary industry	
John Edward Haines	For service to veterans and to local government	
Brian Ernest Phillips Hall	For service to the community	
Ernest Alfred Hammerton	For service to rugby league football	
Violet Kathleen Hardie	For service to the community	
Alfred Keith Harris	For service to children in remote areas	
Joseph Haslam	For service to the community, particularly the aged and to landscape gardening	
Leonard George Hawkett	For service to the community, particularly through toy making for charitable organisations	
June Marie Healy	For service to veterans	
Kenneth William Hesse	For service to the care of the aged	
Norman Frederick Hetherington	For service to children's television programmes and puppetry	
Norman Maxwell Hill	For service to the community and to hockey	
June Mary Hodgson	For service to the community and to local government	
Harold Vincent Horner, DFC	For service to lacrosse	
Norman Lyle Houlahan	For service to local government	
Roy Ronald Howard	For service to local government and to the community	
Patricia Marie Hughes	For service to community health	
Barbara Ruth Stephen Huxtable	For service to the community	
William James Hynes	For service to Australian rules football	
Kevin Raymond Icely	For service to scouting	
Edward Walter Jackson, BEM	For service to veterans and their families	
Leonard William Jacobson	For service to rugby league football particularly as a referee	
Margaret Elizabeth Jones	For service to the community, particularly the aged	
Nicolica Jovanovic	For service to the Serbian community	
Sydney Whittle Kay, ED	For service to veterans	
Leonie Margaret Kelleher	For service to people suffering from Retinitis Pigmentosa	
Ailsa Esme Kelly	For service to speech therapy and to education	
Gabrielle Pamela Joan Kennard	For service to aviation	
The Honourable James William Kennedy	For service to local government to the Legislative Council of NSW and to the community	
Stuart Lyle Kerry	For service to the community	
Dr Christine Anne Kilham	For service to education	
Councillor Kevin John Kirby	For service to local government and to the community	
Horace Raymond Knight	For service to charitable organisations	
Leslie Robert Lambert	For service to the community, particularly through Fire and Emergency Services	
Gloria Noel Agnes Lardelli	For service to people with visual and hearing impairments	
Geoffrey Francis Lawson	For service to cricket	
Marion Rose Le	For service to the Indo-Chinese community	
Joan Margaret Lethbridge	For service to veterans and to the community	
Thomas Allan Melville Lilburne	For service to primary industry, particularly sheep breeding	
Kurt Edward Bernard Lippmann	For service to the Jewish community	
Dulcie Vivian Lucas	For service to the community	
Dr Sheila Amelia Gordon Lungley	For service to community medicine and to hospital administration	
John Emmanuel Lutman	For service to local government and to the community	
Jack Albert Maddox	For service to the community	
Reverend Henry Denis Madigan	For service to the community	
Maroun Arthur Mahboub	For service to the community and to veterans	
Roy John Douglas Mallinson	For service to the community	
Brendan Joseph Manion	For service to the road and transport industry	
Thomas Charles Marr	For service to the community	
Sidney Reginald Marsh	For service to wrestling and to gymnastics	
George Ewen Masson	For service to pipe band music	
Gordon Brian McCormack	For public service, particularly to the fishing industry	
Alexander John McCullough	For service to the community and to local government	
Owen Michael McDonald	For service to people with intellectual disabilities	
Joan Caroline McDonald	For service to the community	
Betty McLean	For service to the arts and to the community	
Elizabeth Joan McMicking	For service to the community	
John Howard Middleton	For public service	
Leslie Thomas Miles	For service to the trade union movement	
Beverley Ellen Mitchell	For service to people with disabilities	
Sibyl Elyne Keith Mitchell	For service to children's literature	
Bernice Fay Catherine Mole	For service to children, particularly as a foster mother	
Barbara Mary Moore	For service to nursing	
Purthanry Thanes Mary Moorhouse	For service to the community	
John Davies Morgan	For service to the Probus Club	
Meron Elizabeth Morrison	For service to the community	
Ralston Albert Mugge	For service to scouting	
Constable Robert Michael Newman	For service to youth	
Reverend Brian William Nicholls	For service to the community, particularly through Lifeline	
John Henry Niewand	For service to the community	
Richard Colin Norris	For public service through the advancement of community health	
Peter H Norvill	For service to aviation	
Fay Valentine Oliver	For service to the Aboriginal education	
John Mitchell Opray	For service to the community	
Zacharias Panarettos	For service to the Greek community	
Brian Francis Peake	For service to Australian rules football	
Brian Harold Pengelly	For service to the education of children with disabilities	
Beverley Ann Perrett	For service to the Adelaide Children's Hospital	
Judith Ann Phelps	For service to softball	
Vanda Podravac	For public service and for service to migrant assistance	
George Pridannikoff	For public service and for service to migrant assistance	
Elsie Grace Pritchard	For service to the Girl Guides Association	
Robert William Provost	For service to veterans	
Margaret Julia Pryor	For service to the Save the Children Fund	
George Robert Quinsey	For service to veterans	
Nancy Una Reynolds	For service to nursing education	
Joyce Adeline Richardson	For service to the welfare of the aged	
Jonetani Dabea Rika	For service to the Aboriginal community	
Rose Marie Robertson	For service to community health	
Stanley William Robins	For service to cycling	
Councillor Pamula Jean Robinson	For service to local government and to conservation	
Dorothy Edna Roche	For service to lawn bowls	
Leonard Stanley Rudd	For service to the community and local government	
Horst Egon Salomon	For service to conservation and the environment	
William Maxwell Scott	For service to youth	
Harold Gordon Scouller	For service to veterans	
Verlie June Seagrove	For service to sport for people with disabilities	
Harry Seis	For service to the community	
Janet Sharp	For service to people with intellectual disabilities	
Oliver Conrad Shaul	For service to the hospitality industry	
Rosemary Margaret Shepherd	For service to the arts, particularly lace making	
Stanley George Sismey	For service to cricket	
Clifford James Skillen	For service to the welfare of the aged	
Hazel Laurel Skuce	For service to community and rural development in Indisa through the Australian Churches of Christ Overseas Mission	
Beverley Helen Elizabeth Smith	For service to people with visual impairments and to nursing	
Margaret Ann Smith	For service to community health	
Nancy Emily Smith	For service to the community, particularly through the Missions to Seamen	
Leila Bega Smith	For service to the community	
Doris May Smith	For service to the community, particularly through music	
Noreen Charlotte Marie Smith	For service to the Pony Club movement	
Ellen Mari Smith	For service to the community	
Lindsay Thomas Statham	For service to the community	
Eric George Henry Stephenson	For service to local government	
Christine Isabel Stewart	For service to children	
Teresa Margaret Elizabeth Stokes	For service to the preservation of local history, particularly through the Cunderdin Museum	
John Suchowiecki	For service to the Polish community	
Alan Peacey Thompson	For service to local government	
Councillor Eric Gordon Thompson	For service to local government	
Edward Elmars Tiltins	For service to small business and to manufacturing	
Joy Vivienne Toll	For service to children with learning disabilities	
Sister Marie Tran-thi-nien	For service to the Vietnamese community to education	
Desmond John Treacy	For service to primary school education	
Patricia Trinick	For service to people with physical disabilities	
Dulcie Irene Trobe	For service to the National Council of Jewish Women	
Anthony Dale Turnbull	For service to harness racing	
Richard Norman Twight	For service to surf life saving	
Eric Stanley Valentine	For service to swimming	
Edna Dorothy Vawser	For service to community and rural development in India through the Australian Churches of Christ Overseas Mission	
Kathleen Joan Venn	For service to the community	
Alfred Russell Viles	For service to veterans	
John Mossman Waddell	For public service particularly through youth rehabilitation programmes	
Charles John Arthur Wade	For service to the entertainment industry and to the community	
Councillor Marie Therese Wallace	For service to local government and to the community	
Francis Victor Charles Walters	For service to the Australia-Japan Association of South Australia	
The Honourable Hector Roy Ward	For service to the Victorian Parliament, to sport and to the community	
Thomas Ernest Ward	For service to the Limbless Soldiers Association of Tasmania	
Maxwell Howard Waterman	For service to ornithology	
Neil Carnegie Watson	For public service	
Leila Anne Watson	For service to the community	
Florence Madge Watts	For service to the arts, particularly through the Nowra Players	
Kevyn Parke Webb	For service to rowing	
Geoffrey Allan Webb	For service to the community	
Veronica Wells	For service to the community, particularly through the Mount Royal Hospital for the Aged	
Alvie Doris Williams	For service to the community through music	
George John Willis	For service to the Police Citizens Youth Club	
Shirley Winton	For service to netball	
Roma Emma Wood	For service to people with hearing impairments	
Joan Kathleen Woolley	For service to the community	
Thornton Edgar Yager	For service to the community	
Robert Henry Yates	For service to local government and to the community	

==== Military Division ====
Branch	Recipient	Citation	Notes
Navy	Warrant Officer Jeffrey Owen Dettman	For service to the Royal Australian Navy, particularly during the introduction of the Pacific Patrol Boat in Papua New Guinea	
Navy	Warrant Officer Colin Stanislaus Dowd	For service to the Royal Australian Navy as Training Quality Officer in HMAS Cerberus	
Navy	Warrant Officer Robin Shane Gray	For service to the Royal Australian Navy, particularly in the field of maintenance development of combat anti-submarine weapon systems	
Navy	Warrant Officer Patrick Nayler	For service to the Royal Australian Naval Reserve, particularly to the Brisbane Port Division in the Technical Branch, Diving Team and Reserves Recruiting	
Navy	Chief Petty Officer Gregory David Pearce	For service to the Royal Australian Navy, particularly as the supervising chef of the Wardroom Galley in HMAS Stalwart	
Navy	Chief Petty Officer Gary Edward Schluter	For service to the Royal Australian Navy, particularly as Maintenance Coordinator and Slipway Dockmaster at HMAS Stirling	
Navy	Warrant Officer Christine Anne Wootton	For service to the Royal Australian Navy in the field of Naval Communications	
Army	Warrant Officer Class One Graham John Brammer	For service to the Australian Army as Regimental Sergeant Major of the North Mobil Force	
Army	Warrant Officer Class Two Peter Maxwell Bruce	For service to the Australian Army as the Finance Warrant Officer and Unit Pay Representative with the Australian Contingent, United Nations Transition Assistance Group, Namibia	
Army	Warrant Officer Class Two Steven Edward Gillett	For service to the Australian Army in the field of repair and maintenance of Carrier Full Tracked Vehicles	
Army	Sergeant Barry James Halter	For service to the Australian Army in the field of nuclear, biological and chemical defence	
Army	Staff Sergeant Robert Richard Kudyba	For service to the Australian Army as a member of the United Nations Mine Clearance Training Team in Pakistan	
Army	Warrant Officer Class Two Suzan Elizabeth Malligan	For service to the Australian Army Reserve in the field of administration	
Army	Warrant Officer Class One Trevor Ernest McKenzie	For service to the Australian Army as Regimental Sergeant Major of the Pilbara Regiment	
Army	Warrant Officer Class One Lance Reeves	For service to the Australian Army in the area of Principal Item Management	
Army	Warrant Officer Class Two Rodney John Teague	For service to the Australian Army as the Senior Supervising Pathology Technician/Instructor at the 1st Military Hospital	
Army	Warrant Officer Class Two William George Thomas	For service to the Australian Army Reserve as Company Sergeant Major with the 41st Battalion, The Royal New South Wales Regiment	
Army	Warrant Officer Class One Keith Robert Walker	For service to the Australian Army in the field of military music and bands	
Army	Warrant Officer Class One Graham Ronald West	For service to the Australian Army in the field of computer management	
Army	Warrant Officer Class One Jeffrey Wayne Yates	For service to the Australian Army as the Regimental Sergeant Major of 2nd Signal Regiment Royal Australian Air Force	
Air Force	Corporal Shayne John Bainbridge	For service to the Royal Australian Air Force as an armament fitter at No 1 Central Ammunition Depot	
Air Force	Warrant Officer Terrence James Brown	For service to the Royal Australian Air Force as Engineer No75 Squadron	
Air Force	Leading Aircraftwoman Joan Marie Butler	For service to the Royal Australian Air Force as stenographer in the Directorate-General of Air Force Legal Services	
Air Force	Flight Sergeant Paul Francis Fernandez	For service to the Royal Australian Air Force as Warehousing Officer Base Squadron Pearce	
Air Force	Warrant Officer Gregory John Hall	For service to the Royal Australian Air Force as Warrant Officer Engineer, HS748 Section Maintenance Squadron East Sale	
Air Force	Warrant Officer Ian John Hudson	For service to the Royal Australian Air Force as the Marine Craft Crewman specialist advisor to the replacement Marine Craft Project	
Air Force	Sergeant Christopher David Lawrence	For service to the Royal Australian Air Force, in particular for engineering duties on data communication systems as a member of Telecommunications Engineering Division	
Air Force	Sergeant Douglas Norman Oldmeadow	For service to the Royal Australian Air Force as a Systems Analyst in the Directorate of Personnel Computing Systems—Air Force	
Air Force	Warrant Officer Colin Young Withenshaw	For service to the Royal Australian Air Force as Warrant Officer in Charge of Laboratories Flight, Number 2 Aircraft Depot	
