= Gender pay gap in Australia =

The Gender pay gap in Australia is a measure comparing the earnings of men and women in the workforce. In Australia, the principle of "equal pay for equal work" was introduced in 1969. Anti-discrimination on the basis of sex was legislated in 1984.

Despite this legislation, the difference between weekly average full-time earnings rose over the last two decades, going from a low of 14.9% in 2004 to a high of 18.9% in 2015. The pay gap has since returned to 14.1%, potentially the result of two newer pieces of legislation, the Workplace Gender Equality Act of 2012 and the Fair Work Act of 2009. Some labour organisations and researchers have criticised these Acts for containing significant limitations that hamper their effectiveness. In a 2015 paper in the Cambridge Journal of Economics, two labour market experts argued that the government's "wavering political commitment to equality legislation generally suggest gender pay inequity will remain a persistent feature of Australian employment."

A report commissioned by the Australian Government in 2016 found that sex discrimination was the leading driver of Australia's gender pay gap, followed by longer interruptions in work-life for women, and industry and occupational segregation.

== Cases and legislation ==
In 1902, a union campaign lead to equal pay for women working in the newly-established Commonwealth Public Service as telegraphists and “postmistresses.”

In 1907, in Ex parte H.V. McKay, more commonly known as the Harvester case, H.B. Higgins of the Commonwealth Court of Conciliation and Arbitration determined that "fair and reasonable" wages for an unskilled male worker required a living wage that was sufficient for "a human being in a civilised community" to support a wife and three children in "frugal comfort", while a skilled worker should receive an additional margin for their skills, regardless of the employer's capacity to pay. That wage was to be determined according to the needs of a male worker not according to the worker's value to the employer.

However, a "fair and reasonable wage" for a female worker was considered by Higgins in 1912 in the Fruit pickers case, which rejected an application for equal pay for women, deciding that this would represent equal pay for unequal work. Higgins held that women should only be awarded the full male rate where there was the risk of cheap female labour displacing men, setting a common rate for fruit pickers of 1 shilling per hour. The work of packing at the factory was "essentially adapted for women with their superior deftness and the suppleness of fingers" and this apparently justified a lower minimum wage of 9 pence per hour, which would provide for the woman's food, shelter and clothing but not that of her family. Until World War II, the female basic wage was, generally speaking, approximately 54% of the male basic wage. Due to labour shortages and union activism a minority of women, such as hotel workers in Victoria and South Australia, were able to secure wage parity during the war. The assumptions of a male bread winner and female domestic carer have been criticised as a deliberate policy of discouraging women in the paid workforce, reflecting a flawed understanding of work and care where the normative worker of the labour market is without responsibilities to care for others. It thus ensured the continuance of the women's inferior place in the paid work force, only entitled to equal wages if their work threatened the position of men.

Until 1969, legislation allowed employers to pay women a minimum rate of pay that was 25% less than male employees doing the same or similar work. In 1969, the first federal Equal Pay case established the principle that where women perform 'equal work' alongside men they should receive equal pay, referred to as "equal pay for equal work". Importantly however equal pay was not applicable "where the work in question is essentially or usually performed by females but is work upon which male employees may also be employed". By 1972 only 18% of women workers, mostly teachers and nurses, received the benefit of the decision.

In 1972, the second federal equal pay case widened the 1969 principle to equal pay for work of equal value in line with International Labour Organization's Equal Remuneration Convention, 1951 (100). This meant that women were awarded the same rate of pay as men - no matter what work they were doing, as long as it was assessed as comparable in value. Some employers sought to avoid paying equal pay by reclassifying women's jobs onto a lower scale to men in similar work. New South Wales (NSW) was the first Australian industrial jurisdiction to legislate for equal pay in the Female Rates (Amendment) Act in 1958. In 2000, the NSW Industrial Relations Commission created Australia's first Equal Remuneration Principle (ERP). The principle provides an avenue for unions to seek redress where they believe work has been undervalued on a gender basis. In 2002, the Full Bench of the NSW Industrial Relations Commission fully ratified the Crown Employees (Librarians, Library Assistants, Library Technicians and Archivists) Award 2002, which incorporated pay increases of up to 26%.

The Commonwealth Affirmative Action (Equal Employment Opportunity for Women) Act 1986 was enacted to improve equity in the Australian workforce and establish the Affirmative Action Agency, with Valerie Pratt as its first director. It aimed to promote equal opportunity for women in employment and eliminate discrimination by the employer against women. In 1999 the agency was changed to the Equal Opportunity in the Workplace Agency to administer the Equal Opportunity for Women in the Workplace Act 1999 (Commonwealth). In 2009, an Australian House of Representatives Pay Equity Report called on the Commonwealth Government to elevate pay equity to be a clear objective of modern awards and recommended the establishment of a federal Pay Equity Unit and the conducting of mandatory pay equity audits for companies with 100 employees or more.

In 2012, the Equal Opportunity for Women in the Workplace Act 1999 was replaced by the Workplace Gender Equality Act 2012, which included the creation of the Workplace Gender Equality Agency. This agency is charged with promoting and improving gender equality in Australian workplaces.

== Studies ==
A 2009 report by the National Center for Social and Economic Modelling (NATSEM) prepared for the Department of Families, Housing, Community Services and Indigenous Affairs stated:

"Utilising robust microeconomic modelling techniques, based on a comprehensive and critical evaluation of several methodologies, we found that simply being a woman is the major contributing factor to the gap in Australia, accounting for 60 per cent of the difference between women’s and men’s earnings, a finding which reflects other Australian research in this area. Indeed, the results showed that if the effects of being a woman were removed, the average wage of an Australian woman would increase by $1.87 per hour, equating to an additional $65 per week or $3,394 annually, based on a 35 hour week." (The second most important factor in explaining the pay gap was industrial segregation.)

Data collected by NATSEM for the Catalyst Australia publication, Equality Speaks, found that the gap between the average wealth of men and women also varies according to the occupations and industries in which they are engaged.

According to industry, the largest gap in personal wealth between men and women is within the finance and insurance sector ($330 600 versus $88 500) where many women work. By contrast, there exists only a small differential in the construction industry ($63 500 versus $62 700) where few women work. In other industries where many women work, there are large wealth gaps: For example, in health and community services ($174 000 versus $68 000) and retail trade ($84 000 versus $34 000).

Turning from industry to occupation, other significant disparities are revealed. The greatest disparity between the average wealth of men and women is amongst elementary clerical, sales and service workers ($110 400 versus $19 900). Jobs that fall within this category include sales assistants, security guards and laundry workers. The smallest relative wealth gap can be seen in advanced clerical and service workers ($91 600 versus $83 500). Jobs in this occupational category include book-keepers, personal assistants and secretaries.

Economist Paul Miller explored the degree to which the Australian gender pay gap differs across the wage distribution and found that the gender pay gap was much greater among high wage earners than among low wage earners. At the top of the wage distribution (95th quartile) the pay gap reached 25% or more while at the bottom the pay gap was around 10%. He concluded that "the notion of a ‘glass ceiling', whereby women struggle to advance beyond some point in the more typical career path, is certainly prevalent in the Australian labour market." In a similar study, Hiao Joo Kee found that the gender pay gap increased at higher levels of the wage distribution in the private sector – leading to her conclusion that a glass ceiling existed there – but that the gap in the public sector was "relatively constant" over all percentiles. Moreover, Kee found that the acceleration of the pay gap across the wage distribution does not vanish even after extensive controls. She concludes that the gender pay gap in both sectors was a result of differences in returns to the same characteristics between men and women.

In November 2024, a government report revealed that Australia's gender pay gap narrowed marginally to 21.8%, a 0.6 percentage point improvement from the previous year. Despite this progress, women on average still earned A$28,425 ($18,590) less annually than their male counterparts. The Workplace Gender Equality Agency (WGEA) noted that over half of employers improved pay equity for men and women performing the same roles.

== Trends in the Australian labour force ==
In 2010 Australian females represented 50.2% of the Australian population and 45.3% of the workforce. Trends within the Australian labour force have female workforce participants increasingly more educated than their male counterparts with more females completing year 12 and going on to university than males. In 2008, females made up 55% of students enrolled in Australian tertiary institutions. In 2010, finance was the industry with the widest gender pay gap at 32.2%, followed by health care and social assistance at 27.2% and mining at 22.7%.

== Western Australia ==
Western Australia has the largest gender pay gap of any state or territory in Australia. As of May 2021, the gap was 21.9% in average weekly ordinary time between male and female earnings.

A specialist Pay Equity Unit in Western Australia was established in 2006 to address the State's gender pay gap. The Western Australian Pay Equity team in the Department of Commerce developed the WA Pay Equity Audit Tool, a resource for employers to use in assessing workforce data and assist in the development of strategies to improve pay equity and female career progression in the workplace.

== Trends in occupations ==
In 2018, the Australian Broadcasting Corporation (ABC) reported on 2015-16 financial year data that was released by the Australian Taxation Office (ATO). In that data the ABC listed the top 10 occupations that had the biggest pay gaps, based on average taxable income. The largest difference between of male and female was Ophthalmologists of $330,933, whereas the largest difference between female and male was State governor of $117,528. The news article also lists the top 80 occupations where females have a higher taxable income than men.

2015-16 financial year.

Male highest difference	Female	Male	Difference
Ophthalmologist	$247,905	$578,838	$330,933
Otorhinolaryngologist	$233,083	$537,764	$304,681
Cricketer	$39,711	$311,972	$272,261
Musician - singer	$38,002	$306,580	$268,578
Orthopaedic surgeon	$198,081	$451,265	$253,184
Dermatologist	$188,298	$416,186	$227,888
Plastic and reconstructive surgeon	$255,336	$481,517	$226,181
Neurosurgeon	$378,188	$600,153	$221,965
Cardiologist	$266,805	$484,086	$217,281
Cardiothoracic surgeon	$187,166	$387,770	$200,604

2015-16 financial year.

Female highest difference	Female	Male	Difference
State governor	$286,676	$169,148	$117,528
Futures trader	$388,681	$300,923	$87,758
Gymnast	$81,354	$31,339	$50,015
Bulldozer operator	$106,899	$76,283	$30,616
Surfer	$68,178	$40,396	$27,782
Master fisher	$110,385	$83,644	$26,741
Apprentice - forestry	$53,413	$29,484	$23,929
Goat farmer	$66,127	$44,495	$21,632
Apprentice autoglazier	$56,072	$34,891	$21,181
Saw sharpener	$84,464	$64,616	$19,848

== See also ==
General:

- Gender inequality
- Discrimination
- Glass ceiling
- Inequality in the workplace
- Occupational inequality
- Occupational sexism
- Sex segregation

Australia:

- Equal Opportunity for Women in the Workplace Agency
- Gender inequality in Australia
- Minister for the Status of Women (Australia)
- Workplace Gender Equality Agency
