= Bromley-Davenport =

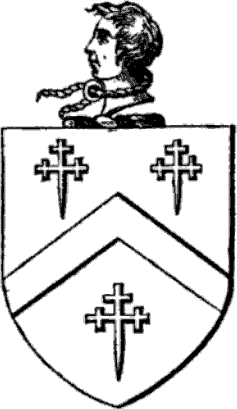
Davenport family arms.

The Davenport family is first recorded in pipe rolls dating before 1254. Roger de Davenport, Lord of Davenport held the hereditary office of Master Serjeant of the Peace for Macclesfield, Cheshire, England in the 1250s.
In 1369, through marriage the family came into possession of the Hall of Calveley, and the manor of Calveley in Bunbury, Cheshire, by the dowery of Agnes, daughter of Hugh Calveley and Contanza de Candia, an Aragonese princess daughter of a Sicilian baron. Their residence was at Woodford and then at Capesthorne Hall, Macclesfield, which they still own.

Bromley-Davenport is the name of:

- Arthur Bromley-Davenport (1867–1946), also known as A. Bromley Davenport, actor
- Harry Bromley Davenport (born 1950), filmmaker
- Hugh Bromley-Davenport (1870–1954), cricketer
- Nicholas Walter Bromley-Davenport (born 1964), High Sheriff of Cheshire 2007–08
- Sir Walter Bromley-Davenport (1903–1989), politician
- William Bromley-Davenport, several individuals

== See also ==
- Bromley (surname)
- Davenport (surname)
