= Co Rentmeester =

Dutch rower and photojournalist (born 1936)

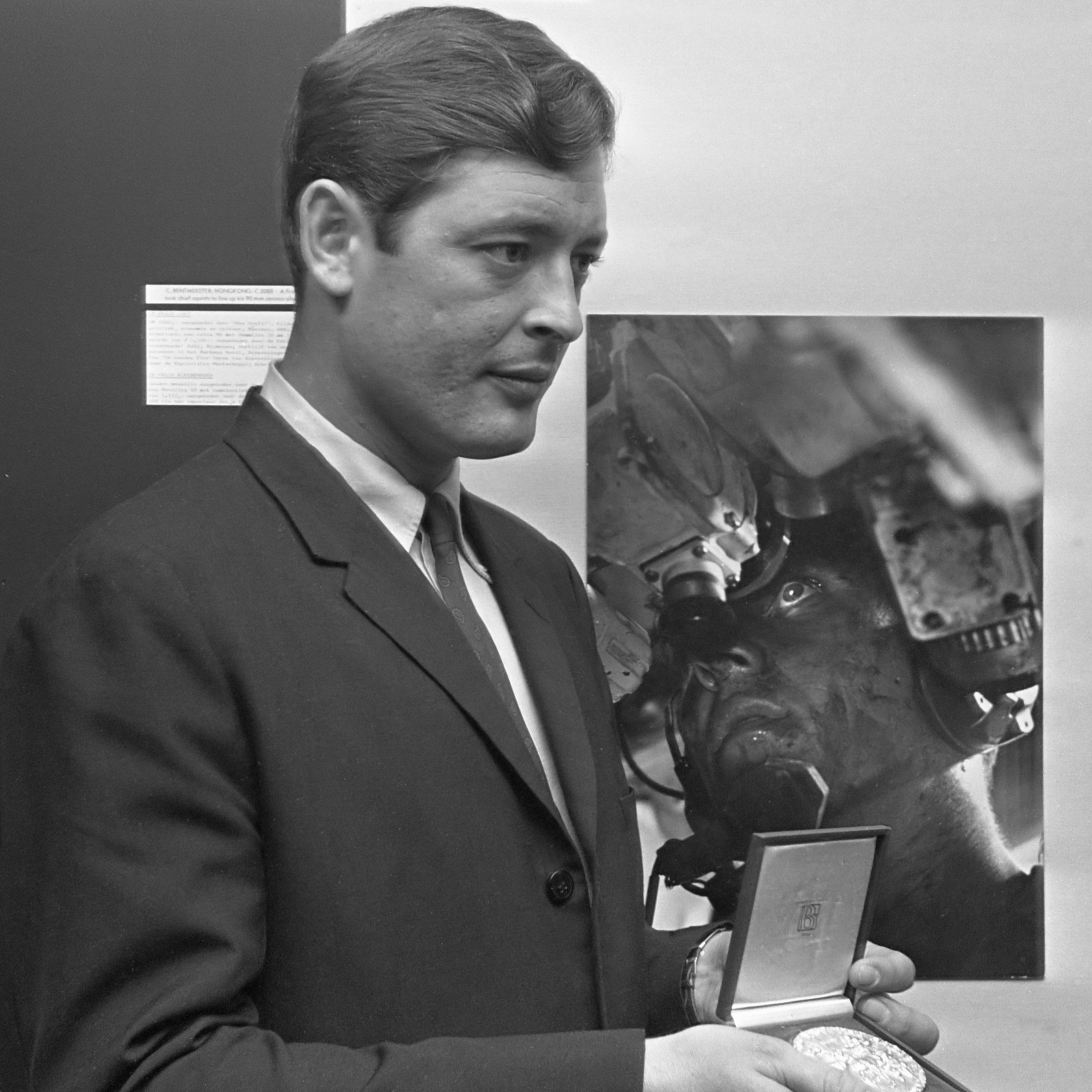
- Rentmeester in front of his picture which became World Press Photo of the Year 1967

Personal information
- Born: Jacobus Willem Rentmeester; 28 February 1936 (age 90) Amsterdam, the Netherlands
- Occupation: Photojournalist

Sport
- Sport: Rowing
Medal record
Men's rowing
Representing the Netherlands
European Championships
Bronze medal – third place	1959 Mâcon	Double scull

Jacobus Willem Rentmeester (born 28 February 1936), nicknamed "Co" or "Ko", is a Dutch rower. He later became a photojournalist and covered the Vietnam War among other newsworthy events.

== Life and career ==
Rentmeester was born in 1936 in Amsterdam. He competed with Peter Bakker in double scull and won bronze at the 1959 European Rowing Championships in Mâcon, France. Bakker and Rentmeester reached the finals in double scull for the Netherlands at the 1960 Summer Olympics in Rome where they came fifth. In early 1961, Rentmeester moved to the United States and studied photography at the Art Center College in Los Angeles.

After receiving his Bachelor of Arts, Rentmeester initially started his career as a freelance photographer in 1965 for Life magazine. A short time later, he joined the Life staff from April 1966 until 1972, when the magazine folded. He first covered the Watts Riots in Los Angeles, documenting many of the dramatic events, which earned him his first accolades as a photographer.

Between late 1965 and 1969, Rentmeester was in Asia, where he particularly covered the Vietnam war. One of his pictures showed an M48 tank gunner looking through a gunsight. It was selected as World Press Photo of the Year and notably it was the first color photograph to win the award. He was also in Hong Kong during the extensive civil disturbances in 1967.

After Rentmeester was wounded by a Vietcong sniper near Saigon, he returned to the U.S. in 1972. His pictures from a trip through Indonesia were shown in the Van Gogh Museum in Amsterdam, the Smithsonian Institution in Washington, D.C., and Asia House in New York.

In the following years, Rentmeester worked for numerous major publications as a photojournalist and as an advertising photographer.

== Awards ==
- 1967: World Press Photo of the Year, 1st prize
- 1972: Magazine photographer of the Year, School of Journalism, University of Missouri
- 1973: World Press Photo, 1st prize in category Sports
- 1976: New York Art Directors Club award for his photo essay on Thomas Jefferson
- 1979: World Press Photo: 2nd prize in category Color picture stories
- 1980: Missouri School of Journalism, award for an essay on the U.S. Air Force
- 2001: KLM Paul Huf Award, Amsterdam The Netherlands
- 2018: Lucy Foundation Award for Outstanding Achievement in Sports Photography

== Publications ==
- "Three Faces of Indonesia," 1974, Thames & Hudson Ltd.
- "Holland on Ice," 1998, First Edition.
- 'FOOTPRINTS" Co Rentmeester 2007, Uitgeverij de Kunst, Weesp, The Netherlands
