= Jannik Madum Andersen =

Danish rower (born 1940)

Personal information
- Nationality: Danish
- Born: 29 March 1940 (age 84); Nakskov, Denmark

Sport
- Sport: Rowing

Jannik Madum Andersen (born 29 March 1940) is a Danish rower. He competed in the men's double sculls event at the 1960 Summer Olympics.
