= Arthur Davenport =

Arthur Davenport may refer to:

- Chaka Fattah (Arthur Davenport, born 1956), former U.S. representative for Pennsylvania
- Arthur Davenport (aeronautical engineer) (1891–1976), British aircraft engineer
- Arthur Davenport (electrical engineer) (1901–1973), New Zealand electrical engineer and electricity administrator
- Arthur Davenport (priest) (1818–1907), Anglican priest in Australia
