= Vrbno nad Lesy =

- Municipality
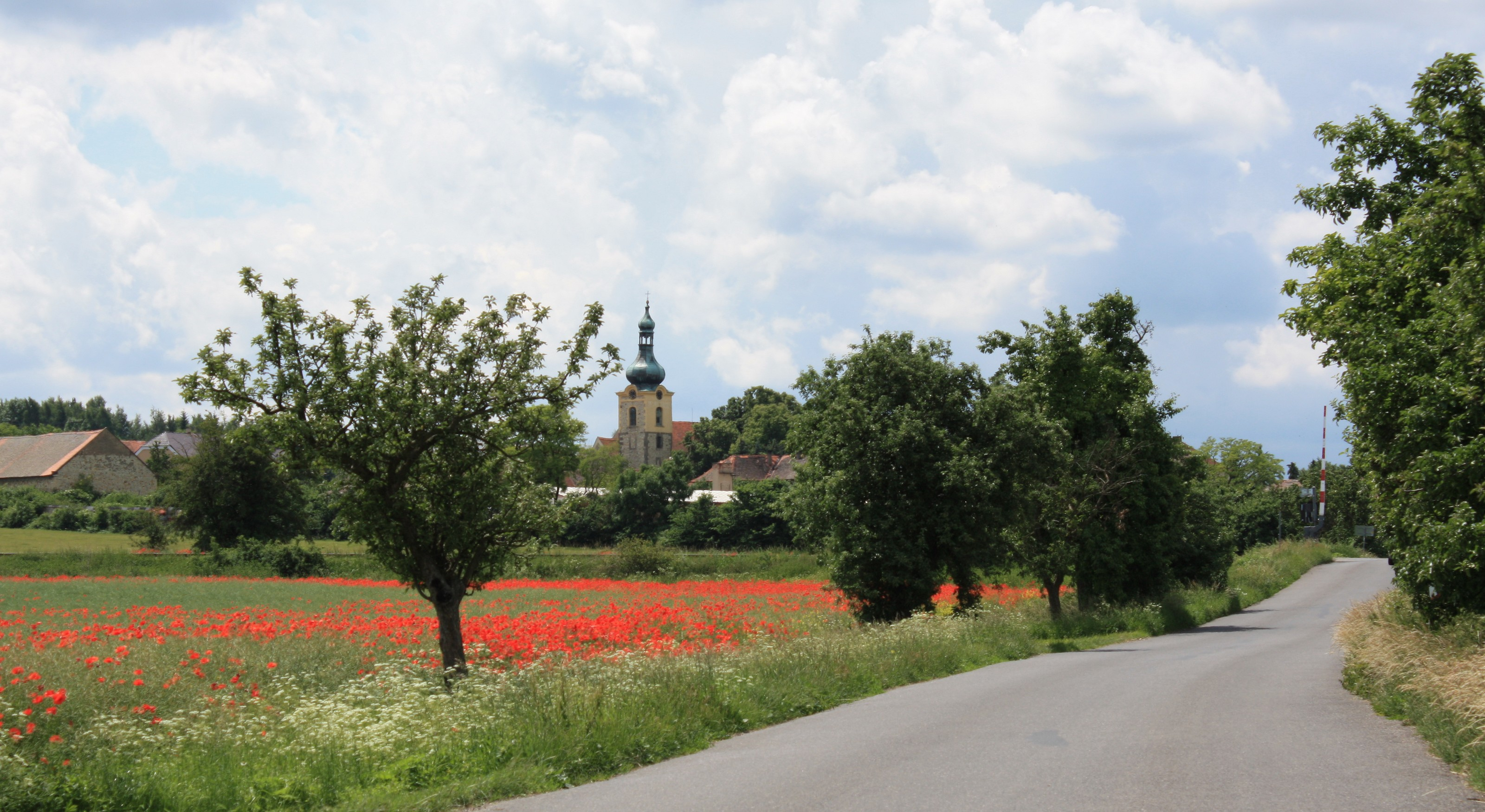
- General view

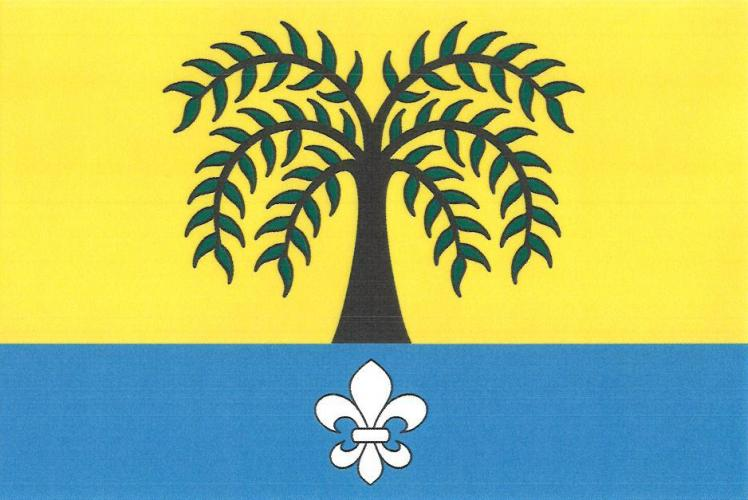
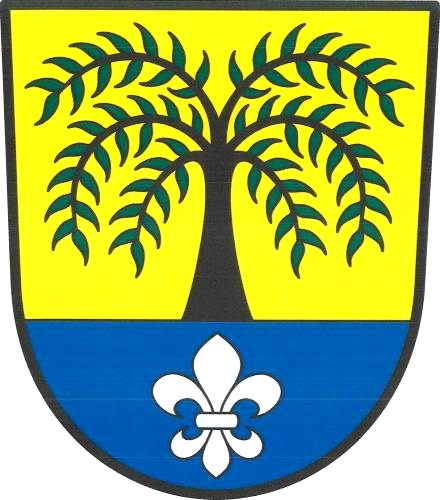
- Flag Coat of arms

- Location in the Czech Republic
- Coordinates: 50°19′21″N 13°54′25″E
- Country: Czech Republic
- Region: Ústí nad Labem
- District: Louny
- First mentioned: 1143

Area
  - Total: 4.73 km^{2} (1.83 sq mi)
- Elevation: 338 m (1,109 ft)

Population (2026-01-01)
  - Total: 207
  - Density: 43.8/km^{2} (113/sq mi)
- Time zone: UTC+1 (CET)
  - Summer (DST): UTC+2 (CEST)
- Postal code: 439 06
- Website: www.vrbnonadlesy.cz

Vrbno nad Lesy (German: Weiden übern Walde) is a municipality and village in Louny District in the Ústí nad Labem Region of the Czech Republic. It has about 200 inhabitants.

== Etymology ==
The name Vrbno is derived from the Czech word vrba ('willow'). Vrbno nad Lesy can be translated as 'willow place near forests'.

== Geography ==
Vrbno nad Lesy is located about 8 kilometres (5 mi) southeast of Louny and 42 km (26 mi) northwest of Prague. It lies in an agricultural landscape in the Lower Ohře Table.

== History ==
The first written mention of Vrbno nad Lesy is from 1143, when it was donated to the Strahov Monastery by Duke Vladislaus II.

== Demographics ==
Historical population

Year	Pop.	±%
1869	354	—
1880	371	+4.8%
1890	390	+5.1%
1900	474	+21.5%
1910	520	+9.7%

Year	Pop.	±%
1921	498	−4.2%
1930	535	+7.4%
1950	367	−31.4%
1961	328	−10.6%
1970	285	−13.1%

Year	Pop.	±%
1980	224	−21.4%
1991	155	−30.8%
2001	147	−5.2%
2011	170	+15.6%
2021	190	+11.8%

Source: Censuses

== Transport ==
Vrbno nad Lesy is located on the railway line Kralupy nad Vltavou–Louny.

== Sights ==
The main landmark of Vrbno nad Lesy is the Church of the Assumption of the Virgin Mary. It was built in the early Gothic style in 1250–1290. In 1665, it was rebuilt in the Baroque style.

== Notable people ==
- Václav Kozák (1937–2004), rower, Olympic winner
