= Gottfried Dittrich =

Austrian rower

Personal information
- Nationality: Austrian
- Born: 12 July 1938 (age 86); Vienna, Nazi Germany

Sport
- Sport: Rowing

Gottfried Dittrich (born 12 July 1938) is an Austrian rower. He competed in the men's double sculls event at the 1960 Summer Olympics.
