= Lawrie Powell =

Australian medical researcher (1934–2022)

Lawrie William Powell AC (4 December 1934 – 23 September 2022) was an Australian medical researcher, specialising in gastroenterology and hepatology.

Powell graduated from Brisbane State High School in 1952. He commenced work at the Royal Brisbane and Women's Hospital as a senior medical student in 1958 prior to commencing a period as a hepatologist at the hospital. After working at the hospital for sixty years, Powell retired in 2018.

Powell made substantial contributions into the research of liver disease, particularly cirrhosis and hemochromatosis, which includes authoring over 400 publications.

He helped establish a comprehensive cancer research centre at the Queensland Institute of Medical Research which opened in September 2001 and was a director from 1990 until 2000.

Powell died on 23 September 2022, at the age of 87.

== Recognition ==
Powell's received a gold medal from the Canadian Liver Foundation. He was made a Companion of the Order of Australia in the 1990 Queen's Birthday Honours in recognition for his service to medicine and medical research, named as the University of Queensland's Alumnus of the Year in 1999 and in 2001 was awarded the Centenary Medal for his service to the community through his role at the Queensland Institute of Medical Research.

He was named as a Queensland Great in 2002.
