= Ernst Hürlimann =

Swiss rower (born 1934)

Personal information
- Born: 19 October 1934 (age 91) Wädenswil, Switzerland

Sport
- Sport: Rowing
Medal record
Men's rowing
Representing Switzerland
Bronze medal – third place	1960 Rome	Double sculls

Ernst Hürlimann (born 19 October 1934) is a Swiss rower who competed in the 1960 Summer Olympics.

He was born in Wädenswil. In 1960 he won the bronze medal with his partner Rolf Larcher in the double sculls event.
