= Severino Lucini =

Italian rower (1929–2023)

Personal information
- Nationality: Italian
- Born: 21 October 1929; Blevio, Italy
- Died: 25 September 2023 (aged 93); Guanzate, Italy

Sport
- Sport: Rowing

Severino Lucini (21 October 1929 – 25 September 2023) was an Italian rower. He competed in the men's double sculls event at the 1960 Summer Olympics.
