= Rolf Larcher =

Swiss rower (1934–2024)

Personal information
- Born: 9 June 1934 Meilen, Switzerland
- Died: 5 March 2024 (aged 89)

Sport
- Sport: Rowing
Medal record
Men's rowing
Representing Switzerland
Bronze medal – third place	1960 Rome	Double sculls

Rolf Larcher (9 June 1934 – 5 March 2024) was a Swiss rower who competed in the 1960 Summer Olympics.

Larcher was born in Meilen. In 1960 he won the bronze medal with his partner Ernst Hürlimann in the double sculls event. Larcher died on 5 March 2024, at the age of 89.
