= Kevyn Webb =

Australian rower

Personal information
- Nationality: Australian
- Born: 21 March 1924 New South Wales, Australia
- Died: 5 November 1990 (aged 66)

Sport
- Sport: Rowing
- Club: Haberfield Rowing Club.
Medal record
Men's rowing
Representing Australia
British Empire (and Commonwealth) Games
Bronze medal – third place	1958 Cardiff	M2-

Kevyn Parke Webb OAM (21 March 1924 – 5 November 1990) was an Australian representative rower. He competed in the men's double sculls event at the 1960 Summer Olympics and won a medal at the 1958 Commonwealth Games. He was a longstanding contributor to the sport in Australia and in 1962 was instrumental in the foundation of annual Australian Rowing Championships.

== Club and state rowing ==
Webb had a long association with the Haberfield Rowing Club. He competed for the club from 1938 to 1960 and then coached. He held a number of official positions including Captain, President and Patron.

Webb was first selected for New South Wales in the 1946 men's eight which contested the King's Cup at the Australian Interstate Regatta. Webb was again in the 1947 NSW King's Cup eight. Both those crews placed second to Victoria.

== International representative rowing ==
In the 1950s Webb took to sculling. He was the sculling reserve for the Australian squad selected for the 1950 Empire Games. At the 1958 British Empire and Commonwealth Games in Cardiff, Webb was selected with Steve Roll to race Australia's coxless pair. They took the silver medal.

For the 1960 Rome Olympics Webb was selected as captain of the Australian rowing squad and rowed the men's double scull with Ian Tutty. They were eliminated in the repechage in those days before B and C finals.

== Australian Rowing Championships ==
In the late 1940s Webb had been involved in unsuccessful campaigns to establish an Australian Rowing Championships and to match the approach taken by other countries in developing the sport and selecting their national crews. Following his return from the 1960 Olympics his suggestions (and a comprehensive report) found an audience and resulting from his work, the inaugural Australian Rowing Championships were held in Ballarat in 1962.

Webb was deeply involved in the New South Wales Rowing Association and regularly on the organising committee of the Australian Championships from 1964. He was the Chairman of that committee in 1988. In the 1990 Queen's Birthday Honours Webb was awarded the Medal of the Order of Australia for his services to rowing. Since 2007 New South Wales clubs competing for a points tally at NSWRA Sprint Championships have raced for the Kevyn Webb Trophy.
