= Aleksandr Berkutov =

Soviet rower (1933–2012)

Personal information
- Born: 21 May 1933 Zubchaninovka, Samara Oblast, Russian SFSR, Soviet Union
- Died: 7 November 2012 (aged 79) Moscow, Russia
- Height: 180 cm (5 ft 11 in)
- Weight: 80 kg (176 lb)

Sport
- Sport: Rowing
- Club: Dynamo Moscow
Medal record
Representing the Soviet Union
Olympic Games
Gold medal – first place	1956 Melbourne	Double sculls
Silver medal – second place	1960 Rome	Double sculls
European Rowing Championships
Bronze medal – third place	1954 Amsterdam	Single sculls
Gold medal – first place	1956 Bled	Double sculls
Gold medal – first place	1957 Duisburg	Double sculls
Gold medal – first place	1958 Poznań	Double sculls
Gold medal – first place	1959 Mâcon	Double sculls
Gold medal – first place	1961 Prague	Double sculls

Aleksandr Nikolaevich Berkutov (Russian: Александр Николаевич Беркутов; 21 May 1933 – 7 November 2012) was a Russian rower who had his best achievements in double sculls, paired with Yuriy Tyukalov. Together they won five consecutive European titles in 1956–61, the Henley Royal Regatta in 1957 and 1958, the Soviet title in 1957 and 1961, an Olympic gold medal in 1956, and an Olympic silver in 1960.

Berkutov started as a single sculler, and in 1954 won the Soviet title and a bronze medal at the European Championships. Next year, facing strong competition from the rising star Vyacheslav Ivanov, he changed to doubles. He retired in 1961 to become a rowing coach, and in 1972 replaced Tyukalov as the head coach of the Soviet national team. From 1990 until his death, he lectured at the Russian State University of Physical Education, Sport, Youth and Tourism.
