= Margaret Carnegie =

Australian writer, collector and patron of the arts

Margaret Frances Carnegie AO (14 March 1910 – 5 August 2002) was an Australian writer, art patron and collector.

== Biography ==
Margaret Frances Carnegie was born in Melbourne on 14 March 1910, daughter of Henry George Allen and Amelia Burberry. She was educated at Lauriston Girls' School and then a finishing school in Switzerland. She married Douglas Howard Carnegie on 11 March 1931 at Scots' Church, Melbourne.

Desmond Digby's portrait of Carnegie was a finalist for the 1966 Archibald Prize. It was acquired by the Art Gallery of New South Wales in 1991.

Carnegie was a major collector of Australian modernist art, including works by Heide Circle artists Sidney Nolan, John Perceval, Arthur Boyd, Joy Hester and Gray Smith. She opened Gray Smith’s 1966 exhibition Canberry Paintings: The First 100 Years in Canberra.

The 1976 film, Mad Dog Morgan, was based on her book, Morgan: The Bold Bushranger.

Carnegie was awarded the Medal of the Order of Australia in the 1985 Australia Day Honours. She was promoted to Officer of the Order of Australia in the 1990 Queen's Birthday Honours for "service to art, literature and to local history".

Carnegie was awarded an honorary doctor of letters by Charles Sturt University in Wagga Wagga, New South Wales. The university holds the Margaret Carnegie Collection of Australiana within its archives.

Carnegie died on 5 August 2002. She was predeceased by her husband in 1998. Her son, Roderick Carnegie, and three daughters survived her.

== Selected works ==
=== Books ===
- Carnegie, Margaret; Hawthorn Press (1973), Friday Mount : first settlement at Holbrook and the south-western slopes of New South Wales, Hawthorn Press, ISBN 978-0-7256-0108-9
- Carnegie, Margaret (1974), Morgan, the bold bushranger, Hawthorn Press, ISBN 978-0-7256-0109-6
- Swan, Keith; Carnegie, Margaret (1979), In step with Sturt, Graphic Books, ISBN 978-0-9596365-5-0
- Carnegie, Margaret; Shields, Frank (1979), In search of Breaker Morant: Balladist and bushveldt carbineer (Paperback ed.), H. H. Stephenson, ISBN 978-0-9596365-1-2
- Carnegie, Margaret (1992), William Knox D'Arcy: Australian gold and Persian oil, Kildrummie Press, ISBN 978-0-646-07850-2
- Carnegie, Margaret; Boldrewood, Rolf (1993), Pacific gold: California 1848 Australia 1851, including Genesis of gold-fields law in Australia, Kildrummie Press, ISBN 978-0-646-14045-2

=== Libretto ===
- Martin, Desmond; Carnegie, Margaret; Rolfe, Douglas G (1984), Gabriel and Louisa: An Australian ballad operetta : a somewhat frivolous version of the romantic history of Gabriel Louis Marie Huon de Keriliau and his wife Louisa, during the foundation years of Australia, 1788 to 1892, A.K.P.
