= Poul Mortensen =

Danish rower

Personal information
- Nationality: Danish
- Born: 19 August 1937 (age 87); Svendborg, Denmark

Sport
- Sport: Rowing

Poul Mortensen (born 19 August 1937) is a Danish rower. He competed in the men's double sculls event at the 1960 Summer Olympics.
