= Yuriy Tyukalov =

Russian rower (1930–2018)

- Tyukalov in 1977

Personal information
- Born: 4 July 1930 Leningrad, Russian SFSR, Soviet Union
- Died: 19 February 2018 (aged 87) Saint Petersburg, Russia
- Height: 181 cm (5 ft 11 in)
- Weight: 77 kg (170 lb)

Sport
- Country: Soviet Union
- Sport: Rowing
- Club: Krasnoye Znamya Leningrad; Trud Leningrad
Medal record
Representing the Soviet Union
Olympic Games
Gold medal – first place	1952 Helsinki	Single sculls
Gold medal – first place	1956 Melbourne	Double sculls
Silver medal – second place	1960 Rome	Double sculls
World Rowing Championships
Bronze medal – third place	1962 Lucerne	Coxed four
European Rowing Championships
Gold medal – first place	1954 Amsterdam	Coxed four
Silver medal – second place	1955 Ghent	Single sculls
Gold medal – first place	1956 Bled	Double sculls
Gold medal – first place	1957 Duisburg	Double sculls
Gold medal – first place	1958 Poznań	Double sculls
Gold medal – first place	1959 Mâcon	Double sculls
Gold medal – first place	1961 Prague	Double sculls
Gold Cup Challenge
Gold medal – first place	1952 Philadelphia	Single sculls

Yury Sergeyevich Tyukalov (Russian: Юрий Серге́евич Тюкалов; 4 July 1930 – 19 February 2018) was a Soviet-Russian rower. He started primarily as a single sculler; he also won an Olympic gold medal in 1952 and a silver medal at the 1955 European Championships. His Olympic medal was the first Soviet gold medal in rowing. Later in 1955, facing strong competition against the rising star Vyacheslav Ivanov, he teamed with Aleksandr Berkutov. Together they won five consecutive European titles between 1956 and 1961; the Henley Royal Regatta in 1957 and 1958; the Soviet title in 1957 and 1961; an Olympic gold medal in 1956; and an Olympic silver in 1960.

Tyukalov was a native of Saint Petersburg (Leningrad) and spent his entire life in the city. He survived the Siege of Leningrad (1941–44), and during that time helped extinguish fires brought by German air raids. He was awarded the Medal "For the Defence of Leningrad", and was named an honored citizen of Saint Petersburg.

Tyukalov took up rowing in June 1945 and won multiple national rowing titles between 1948 and 1962. After retiring from competitions, he worked as a coach and headed the Soviet rowing team between 1968 and 1972. Starting from 2012 he organized the "Regatta of Yuriy Tyukalov", which was also carried out every year after his death. Besides rowing Tyukalov was a renowned sculptor in metal. He graduated with honors from the Leningrad Higher School of Art and Industry and later designed a coat of arms for Saint Petersburg.
