= Thorstein Kråkenes =

Norwegian rower

Medal record

Men's rowing

Olympic Games
Bronze medal – third place	1948 London	Eight

European Rowing Championships
Bronze medal – third place	1949 Amsterdam	Four

Thorstein Kråkenes (3 April 1924 – 17 September 2005) was a Norwegian competition rower and Olympic medalist. He received a bronze medal in the men's eight at the 1948 Summer Olympics, as a member of the Norwegian team. His brother Harald was a member of the same Olympic team. His brother Sverre is also a competition rower, who participated in the 1952 and 1960 Olympic games.

Kråkenes received a bronze medal in coxless four at the 1949 European championships. He participated in men's four at the 1952 Summer Olympics.
