= Heinz Becher =

German rower (1933–2019)

Personal information
- Birth name: Heinz Manfred Becher
- Born: 4 September 1933; Worms, Germany
- Died: 30 May 2019 (aged 85)
- Height: 192 cm (6 ft 4 in)
- Weight: 85 kg (187 lb)

Sport
- Sport: Rowing

Heinz Manfred Becher (4 September 1933 – 30 May 2019) was a West German rower who represented the United Team of Germany. He competed at the 1960 Summer Olympics in Rome with the men's double sculls where they were eliminated in the round one repechage.
