= Cesarino Pestuggia =

Italian rower

Personal information
- Nationality: Italian
- Born: 11 September 1934 (age 92) Nesso, Italy

Sport
- Sport: Rowing

Cesarino Pestuggia (born 11 September 1934) is an Italian rower. He competed in the men's double sculls event at the 1960 Summer Olympics.
