= Václav Kozák =

Czech rower

Personal information
- Born: 14 April 1937 Vrbno nad Lesy, Czechoslovakia
- Died: 15 March 2004 (aged 66) Terezín, Czech Republic
- Height: 179 cm (5 ft 10 in)
- Weight: 78 kg (172 lb)

Sport
- Sport: Rowing
- Club: ČAC Roudnice
- Coached by: František Vrba
Medal record
Representing Czech Republic
Olympic Games
Gold medal – first place	1960 Rome	Double sculls
European Rowing Championships
Silver medal – second place	1959 Mâcon	Double sculls
Bronze medal – third place	1961 Prague	Double sculls
Gold medal – first place	1963 Copenhagen	Single sculls
Bronze medal – third place	1965 Duisburg	Coxed four

Václav Kozák (14 April 1937 – 15 March 2004) was a Czech rower who competed for Czechoslovakia at the 1960, 1964 and 1968 Olympics. In 1960, he won the gold medal in double sculls together with Pavel Schmidt. In 1964 and 1968 he placed 12th and 9th in the single sculls, respectively. At the European championships Kozák won four medals in various events between 1959 and 1965, including a gold in single sculls in 1963. The same year he was named Czechoslovak athlete of the year.

Kozák started as a cyclist, and changed to rowing in 1952 motivated by the gold medal of the Czech coxed fours at the 1952 Olympics. In 1955 he won a national junior title in single skulls, and in 1957 won his first national senior title; he later added 14 more in various disciplines. After retiring from competitions he worked as a rowing coach at the Dukla club in Prague, raising several world championship and Olympic medalists. He was also a military officer and retired in 1991 as lieutenant colonel. In his later life he developed an addiction to alcohol and became homeless for a while. He died aged 66.
