= Alexander Day (con artist) =

18th century British con artist

- Other names: Marmaduke Davenport, Esq.
- Conviction: Four counts of defrauding (1723)
- Criminal charges: Four counts of defrauding; two counts of grand larceny
- Penalty: Two years' imprisonment; standing twice in the pillory; a fine of £200

Alexander Day (also known as Marmaduke Davenport, Esq.) was a British sharper known for cons committed in London in September 1722. Originally from St Andrew Holborn, Day went under the name Marmaduke Davenport, Esq. and hired a carriage and footman to create the impression to shopkeepers in London that he was a respected member of the gentry. Once the shop proprietors had supplied their goods, Day would flee without paying.

In 1723, Day was arrested in connection with a robbery of a mail coach in Clapham. Although he was ruled out as a suspect of this crime, he was indicted on four counts of defrauding and two counts of grand larceny for crimes committed in the September of the previous year. After his trial, Day was found guilty on all counts of defrauding and was sentenced to two years' imprisonment at Newgate Prison, which included standing twice in the pillory and paying a fine of £200.

== Criminal career ==
Alexander Day originated from the parish of St Andrew, Holborn. He worked as a sharper in London where he went under the pseudonym Marmaduke Davenport Esq. to suggest that he was a member of the gentry. To further this claim, Day would say that he had a large estate in Durham and was engaged to a wealthy heiress. Day also claimed to have left his own coachman and horses at his country seat and needed to hire a carriage and footman in London. Once he had hired the carriage and footman, he took this entourage around numerous premises in the city, where he would convince shopkeepers that he was about to spend large amounts of money on their expensive goods.

This perceived wealth and social status led him to be able to gain credit on purchases. Day would take delivery of upper-class items at his rented Queen Square property, but would fail to pay. Historian Hannah Grieg hypothesises that Day may have previously spent time in Bath, Newcastle upon Tyne and Edinburgh, where he practised his craft and stole goods to furnish his London home and further convince his victims of his wealth.

== Arrest and trial ==
In 1723, Day was arrested on suspicion of robbing the Bristol mail coach at Clapham, though subsequent investigations ruled him out as a suspect. During this time, he was indicted on four counts of defrauding and two counts of grand larceny. These charges referred to crimes committed in September 1722, which included:

1. the theft of gold and silver lace to the value of £55,
2. the defrauding of Thomas Gravestock, the proprietor of the gold and silver lace,
3. the defrauding of Samuel Scrimpshaw for cambric valued at £48,
4. the defrauding of George Kendrick for tea valued at £51,
5. the "felonious" theft of 3.5 yards (3.2 m) of rich brocade, 15 yards (14 m) of cherry-powdered podesay and 15 yards (14 m) of white podesay at a combined value of £34,
6. the defrauding of a Mr. Hinchliff, the proprietor of the brocade and podesay.

During the trial, Day stated that he had stolen to keep up with annual £200 payments on his Durham estate, which was mortgaged for £1,200, but he was unable to provide evidence of the Durham estate and could not provide a witness willing to testify to his reputation. The court did not believe his defence and he was found guilty of defrauding all persons in the case.

On 24 April 1723, Day was sentenced to two years' imprisonment at Newgate Prison. This would include standing twice in the pillory, as well as a fine of £200. He would then be under probation for the two years following his release. Peter King of the Open University identifies that Day's first pillory was in Covent Garden, where he was surrounded by a large crowd and was severely pelted with rotten vegetables and faeces for an hour. A newspaper report published after Day's sentence stated that he was "a great master of his profession [who] would not be at liberty to follow his former profession any longer". The second pillory took place at Ludgate Hill.
