= An Apology for Mohammed and the Koran =

1869 book by John Davenport

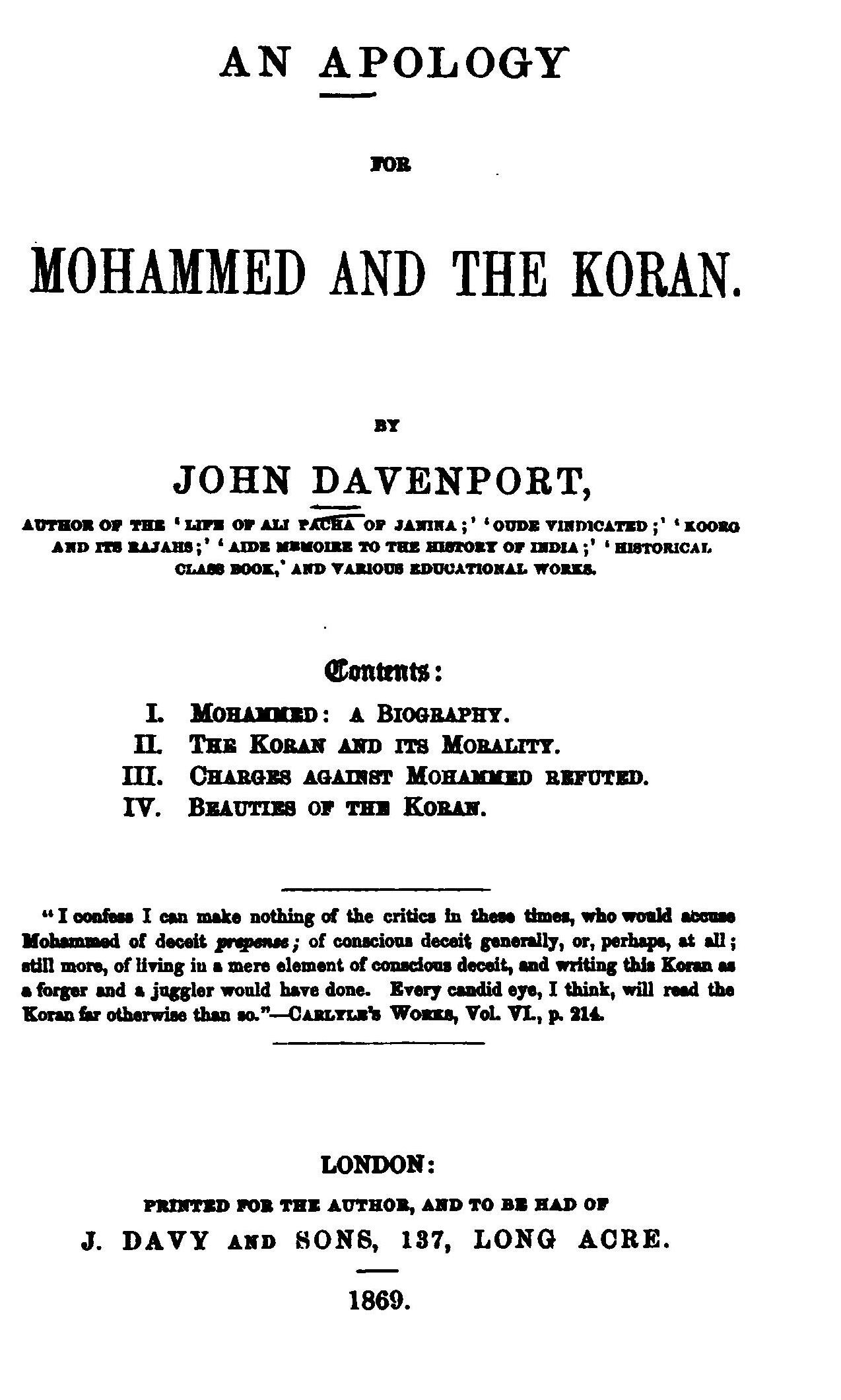
- Authors: John Davenport
- Language: English
- Subject: Islam, Muhammad
- Publication date: 1869
- Publication place: United Kingdom
- ISBN: 978-1-330-05742-1

An Apology for Mohammed and the Koran is an 1869 book by British writer John Davenport in which the author provides an account of his encounter with Islam.

== Reception ==
It has been translated into Arabic, Persian and Urdu. The Persian translation of the book won the Iranian Royal Book of the Year.

Ali Khamenei, the supreme leader of Iran, appreciated the book, and in 2016 said: "Davenport was non-Muslim but since he was a man of knowledge and understanding, when he looks at the truths of Quran and the stronghold of the verses of this book, he understands that these truths are not from the limited human mind and are hence undeniable."
