= William Bromley =

William Bromley may refer to:

- William Bromley (MP for Liverpool), MP for Liverpool
- William Bromley (of Holt Castle) (1656–1707), Whig MP for Worcester and Worcestershire
- William Bromley (speaker) (1663–1732), Speaker of the British House of Commons
- William Bromley (died 1737) (c.1699–1737), MP for Fowey, Warwick, and Oxford University (son of the above)
- William Throckmorton Bromley (c.1726–1769), MP for Warwickshire (son of the above)
- William Bromley (artist) (1769–1842), British engraver
- William Bromley III (1816–1890), English genre painter

== See also ==
- William Bromley-Davenport (disambiguation)
