= Aphrodisiacs and Anti-aphrodisiacs =

1869 book by John Davenport

Aphrodisiacs and Anti-aphrodisiacs: Three Essays on the Powers of Reproduction; with some account of the judicial "congress" as practised in France during the seventeenth century
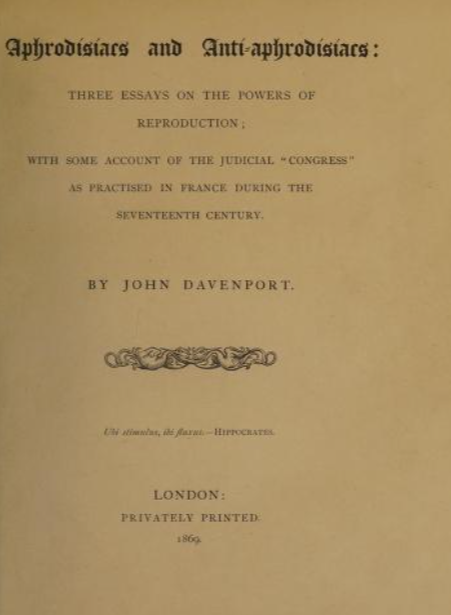
- Title page for Aphrodisiacs and Anti-aphrodisiacs (1869)
- Authors: John Davenport
- Language: English
- Subject: phallic worship, anaphrodisiac, aphrodisiacs
- Publication date: 1869/1873
- Publication place: United Kingdom

Aphrodisiacs and Anti-aphrodisiacs: Three Essays on the Powers of Reproduction is an 1869/1873 book by John Davenport in which the author provides an account of sexual rituals and symbols.

== Publication ==
John Camden Hotten prepared the book for the press. Dragana Đorđević believes the book to be backdated and argues that it was in fact printed in 1873 because "custom of back-dating a new text was as common in this business as the practice of up-dating an old one." 100 copies were advertised but 250 were actually printed.

== Reception ==
Steven Marcus regards it "with a certain amount of sympathy and respect."
