= Pavel Schmidt =

Slovak rower

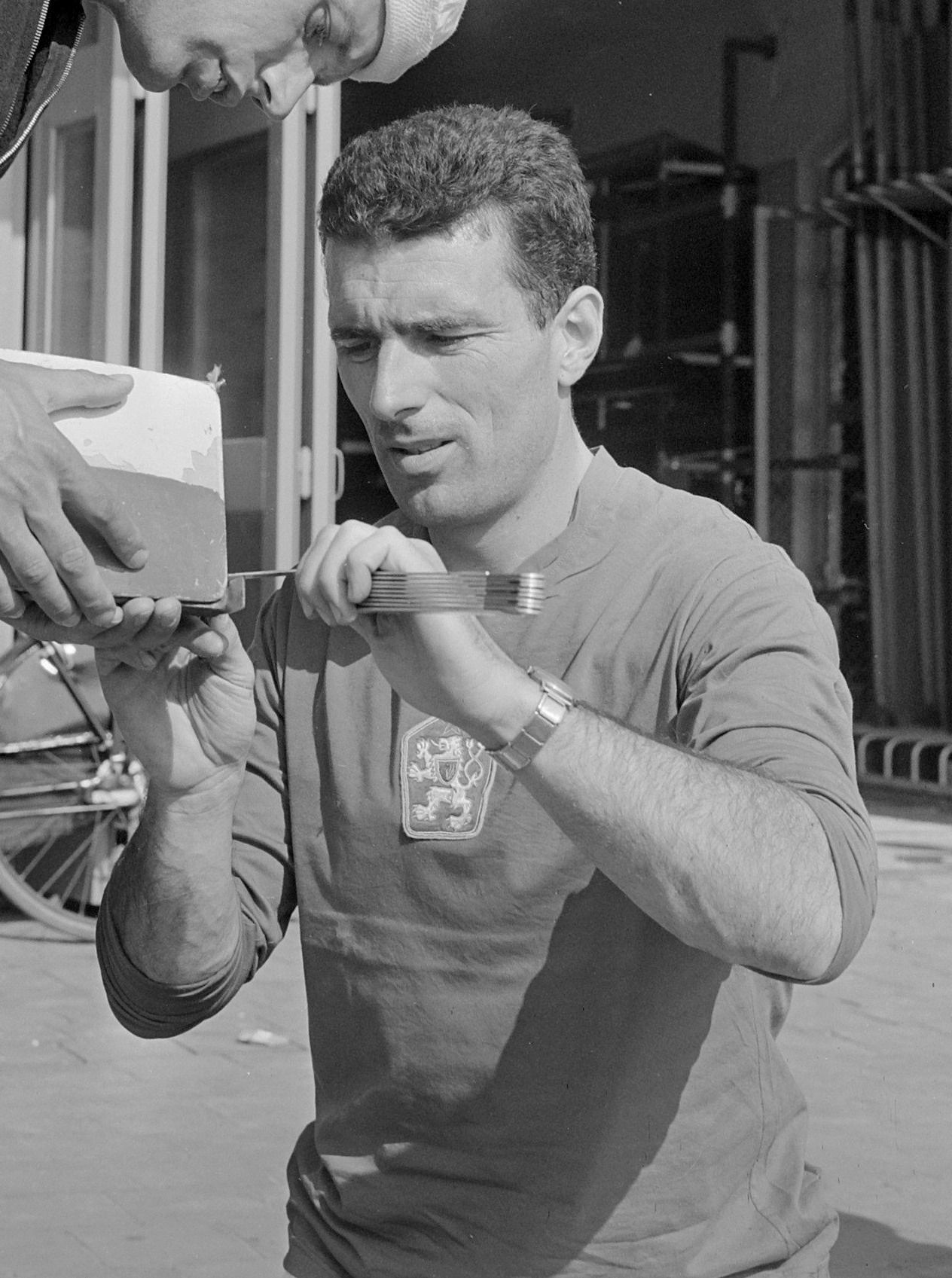
- Schmidt at the 1964 European Championships

Personal information
- Born: 9 February 1930 Bratislava, Czechoslovakia
- Died: 14 August 2001 (aged 71) Magglingen, Switzerland
- Height: 180 cm (5 ft 11 in)
- Weight: 82 kg (181 lb)

Sport
- Sport: Rowing
- Club: Aušpic
Medal record
Representing Czech Republic
Olympic Games
Gold medal – first place	1960 Rome	Double sculls
European Rowing Championships
Silver medal – second place	1959 Mâcon	Double sculls
Bronze medal – third place	1961 Prague	Double sculls

Pavel Leo Edmund Schmidt (9 February 1930 – 14 August 2001) was a Slovak rower who competed for Czechoslovakia, mostly in the double sculls together with Václav Kozák. They won a gold medal at the 1960 Summer Olympics in Rome and two medals at European championships in 1959 and 1961, and placed fourth at the 1962 World Rowing Championships.

After retiring from competitions, Schmidt became a rowing coach, and in 1967–68 trained the Mexico national team. After that he did not return to Czechoslovakia, but settled in Switzerland together with his family. There he worked as a psychiatrists and as a coach at the Biel sports school.
