= Thomas Davenport (inventor) =

American blacksmith

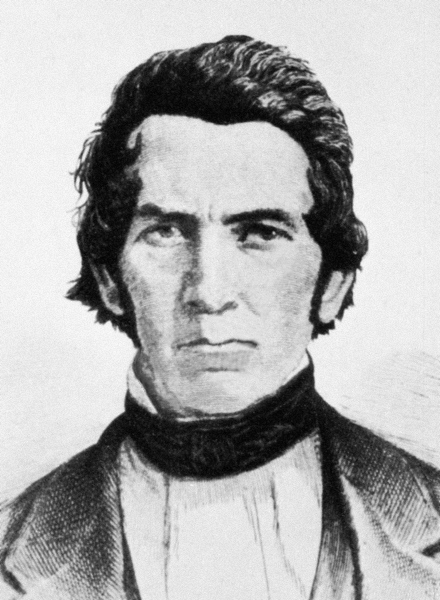
- Davenport c. 1850
- Born: July 9, 1802; Williamstown, Vermont, United States
- Died: July 6, 1851 (aged 48); Salisbury, Vermont
- Resting place: Pine Hill Cemetery, Brandon, Vermont
- Occupations: Blacksmith; Inventor
- Employer: Orange Smalley
- Known for: inventing the electric motor
- Spouse: Emily (Goss) Davenport (m. 1827-1851, his death)
- Children: 2

Thomas Davenport (July 9, 1802 – July 6, 1851) was a Vermont blacksmith who, with his wife Emily, constructed the first American DC electric motor in 1834.

== Biography ==
Davenport was born in Williamstown, Vermont. He lived in Forest Dale, a village in the town of Brandon.

As early as 1834, his wife and he Emily Davenport developed a battery-powered electric motor. They used it to operate a small model car on a short section of track, paving the way for the later electrification of streetcars. It is the first attempt to apply electrification to locomotion.

Davenport's 1833 visit to the Penfield and Taft iron works at Crown Point, New York, where an electromagnet was operating, based on the design of Joseph Henry, was an impetus for his electromagnetic undertakings. Davenport bought an electromagnet from the Crown Point factory and took it apart to see how it worked. Then he forged a better iron core and redid the wiring, using silk from his wife's wedding gown.

With his wife Emily and colleague Orange Smalley, Davenport received the first American patent on an electric machine in 1837, U. S. Patent No. 132. In 1840, he printed The Electro-Magnetic and Mechanics Intelligencer, making it the first magazine to be printed with electricity.

In 1849, Charles Grafton Page, the Washington scientist and inventor, commenced a project to build an electromagnetically powered locomotive, with substantial funds appropriated by the US Senate. Davenport challenged the expenditure of public funds, arguing for the motors he had already invented. In 1851, Page's full sized electromagnetically operated locomotive was put to a calamity-laden test on the rail line between Washington and Baltimore.
