= John Davenport (orientalist) =

British orientalist scholar

- Born: 8 June 1789; London
- Died: 1877
- Occupations: orientalist, erotica writer
- Writing career
- Notable works: An Apology for Mohammed and the Koran, Aphrodisiacs and Anti-aphrodisiacs

John Davenport (8 June 1789 – 1877) was a British orientalist and writer. He is best known for his book An Apology for Mohammed and the Koran.

== Life ==
He was born on 8 June 1789, in London. His father was from Staffordshire. Like his father, Davenport was a liveryman. He lost his sight in his later life. Joscelyn Godwin describes him as "a poor scrivener who led a precarious existence teaching Oriental languages and writing hack literature". Davenport is known for writing some books which deal with erotic subjects.

His book An Apology for Mohammed and the Koran has been translated into several different languages.

== Works ==
- Sexagyma: A Digest of the Works of John Davenport
- Aphrodisiacs and Anti-aphrodisiacs: Three Essays on the Powers of Reproduction
- Curiositates Eroticæ Physiologiæ: Or, Tabooed Subjects Freely Treated
- An apology for Mohammed and the Koran
- Muhammad and teachings of Quran
- A new dictionary of the Italian and English languages
- Life of Ali Pacha of Janina
- Oude Vindicated
- Koorg and its Rajahs
- Aide Mémoire to the History of India
- Historical Class Book
