= Jean-Marie Lemaire =

Belgian rower

Personal information
- Born: 15 June 1936 (age 90) Liège, Belgium
- Died: 24/04/2012
- Height: 1.79 m (5 ft 10 in)
- Weight: 77 kg (170 lb)

Sport
- Sport: Rowing
- Club: UNL, Liège

Jean-Marie Lemaire (born 15 June 1936) is a retired Belgian rower. He competed at the 1960 Summer Olympics in the double sculls event, with Gérard Higny, and finished in sixth place.
