= Sverre Kråkenes =

Norwegian rower

Personal information
- Born: 11 March 1931 (age 94); Bergen, Norway

Sport
- Country: Norway
- Sport: Rowing

Sverre Kråkenes (born 11 March 1931) is a Norwegian competition rower. He competed in the 1952 Summer Olympics and the 1960 Summer Olympics. His brothers Harald and Thorstein are also Olympic competition rowers.

Kråkenes won nine national titles in single sculls, in 1950, 1951, 1955, 1956, 1958, 1959, 1960, and 1961.
