= Löblich & Co. =

Löblich & Co., full name Löblich & Co. Kessel- und Apparatebau KG, is the name of one of the oldest operating companies in Austria. Löblich & Co. was founded as a coppersmith's workshop in the old city of Vienna in 1738 and is today operating in the fields of gas heating and professional kitchens as well as real estate development. The headquarters is in Vienna.

== History ==
Loeblich&Co. Kessel und Apparatebau KG
the Entrepreneurs 1738–today
T I M E F R A M E :
1738–1774
Josef Krottenthaller
1774–1802
Krottenthaller's widow/heirs
1802–1821
Johann Georg Wolf
1823–1857
Leopold Loeblich I.
married to Katharina Wolf
1857–1860
Leopold Loeblich II.
1857–1897
Franz Loeblich I.
1897–1935
Leopold Loeblich III.
1929–1945
Franz Loeblich II.
1929–1984
Maximilian Leopold Loeblich
1970–1998
Max Wolfgang Loeblich
Adolf Loeblich
1998–akt.
Markus Seiller-Tarbuk
(Son of Konstanze b. Loeblich)

The company was founded on 20 August 1738 by Josef Krottenthaller in Vienna as a coppersmith. After his death, his wife Eva continued to run the business for 14 years. His five daughters then inherited the smithy, hiring Johann Georg Wolf as managing director, who finally took over the business in its entirety on 19 December 1802. The son of his sister Katharina and the cellar master Ferdinand Löblich, Leopold Löblich (* 1795) took over the business on 20 July 1823 after the death of his uncle. Leopold Löblich was a master coppersmith from 1814 and had been working in the company since 23 June 1810. The company is still owned by the descendants of the Löblich family.

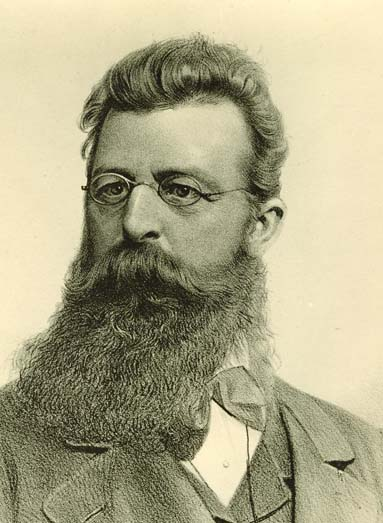
Franz Loeblich

The company experienced a major upswing in the 19th century under the leadership of Franz Löblich (1827-1897), the second son of Leopold Löblich, who developed from a craft business into a manufacturer of copper tableware, heating and cooking appliances. During his time, production was relocated to Nußdorfer Straße station in 1860.

Famous personalities, VIPs and institutions, such as the emperors of the K.u.K. Austro-Hungarian Monarchy, state presidents, prime minister and cabinet ministers of the Federal Austrian Republic, as well as governments, from a number of states in Europe, Africa and Asia, but also artists have since a long time been amongst the clients of Löblich & Co..

From 1858, Löblich supplied copper tableware to the imperial court, which needed tinned moulds for the court confectionery and the court kitchens. Franz Löblich was finally appointed purveyor to the imperial and royal court in 1893 and Court supplier in 1893.

Under Leopold Löblich (III.), the son of Franz Löblich, chairman of the Imperial and Royal Coppersmiths' Association, production was reorganised at the beginning of the 20th century and stainless steel production was introduced in Austria in the 1920s and 30s for commercial kitchens and the production of catering equipment. This was initially due to a shortage of copper as a result of the First World War. Subsequently, the change of material born out of this necessity was used to advantage and the new stainless steel alloys introduced by Löblich considerably increased the durability of cooking kettles.

Leopold Löblich (III.) received support from his nephews Franz and Max after 1929. In the period before the Second World War, the cooking utensils and catering machines produced by Löblich were distributed internationally to a considerable extent for a small Austrian company, for example the samovars for the Trans-Siberian Railway or the steam-powered coffee brewer 'Mustapha', which was awarded a gold medal at the World Exhibition in Paris in 1937.

During the Second World War, the company received orders from the Wehrmacht to equip kitchens and military hospitals. Due to fighting in Vienna in 1945, the majority of the company archive was burnt.

After the Second World War, Austria's first gas boilers and water heaters were developed under KR Ing. Maximilian Leopold Loeblich, and the first wall-mounted gas heating appliances were also built. In the 1950s, Löblich shifted its focus from commercial kitchen technology to the production of boilers for town gas, later natural gas, which became the company's most important business area until the 1970s. In the 1980s and 1990s, under the management of Adolf Löblich and Max Wolfgang Löblich, there was a gradual shift towards sales partnerships, wholesale and service activities.

Under engineer Max W. Löblich, the import for large French and Italian heating manufacturers was taken over. In the heating appliance export sector, the reference projects range from Austria's neighboring countries (Hungary, Slovenia) to Africa (Algeria). In the catering technology sector, Adolf Löblich and Markus Seiller-Tarbuk exported a large number of commercial kitchens to hospitals and hotels worldwide (for example to Zambia, Egypt, Libya, Ceylon, Indonesia and the Philippines). With their nephew Markus Seiller-Tarbuk, the sixth generation - in direct line - of the entrepreneurial family has now been active in the management of the company since 1823.

As part of a reorganization in 1999, parts of the business were closed down and the heating technology and catering technology divisions were concentrated, with large-scale catering projects, primarily in Africa, South East Asia and East Asia, supplementing activities on the domestic market. In the domestic market, the company is concentrating on the gas heating and commercial kitchen technology business areas. A separate division of the Group is property development with a focus on commercial properties. The company's many years of experience with the specific requirements of properties for production, workshops, offices and warehousing operations served to establish a new mainstay, the development of commercial properties for warehouses and workshops in a separate real estate company.

== Products ==
- MUSTAPHA (filter coffee machine): filter coffee brewing machine in the coffee houses in Austria-Hungary around 1900 from Cafe Tomaselli (Salzburg), Demel's (Vienna), Cafe Sacher (Vienna), Caffe Tommaseo (Trieste), Café l'Europe (Czernowitz), Cafe New York (Budapest)
- Löblich GWU (Gas Wasser Umlaufheizer): first floor-standing steel heater for gas in Austria, invented and designed by heating engineer Maximilian Leopold Loeblich (b. 1901-d.1984)
- Löblich GWS: first floor-standing steel, enameled storage water-heater
- Löblich combi-boilers: first wall-hung compact gas boilers
- Löblich GLM: cooperation with French manufacturer Emile Marcel Leblanc, introducing heat exchangers made of hard welded copper, till today the most compact sized wall-hung boilers of all
- Löblich Catering Systems: worldwide supplier of professional kitchens in copper and stainless steel
- Löblich Service: technical repair service

== Distribution & Services ==
- Gas heating (heating boilers and water heaters): Löblich is operating as regional distributor and service organisation for the world market leader Bosch Thermotechnik and other manufacturers.
- Catering systems (professional kitchens, machines for professional cooking and food production): regional sales, installation and local service in Vienna and East Austria.
- Real estate: the company is developing real estate (premises for small-business use) in Vienna.

== Trivia ==
The Viennese have a special nickname for the ever-present, Löblich-servicecars in the city:

"Zitronenbomber" - lemon-bomber, which refers to the bright yellow colour of the fast driving small trucks.
