= Valerie Pratt =

Australian company director and academic

Valerie Pratt AO
- Born: 1929 (age 96–97)
- Education: University of Sydney
- Employer(s): Affirmative Action Agency; Macquarie University
- Organization: National Seniors Australia Limited

Valerie Pratt AO (born 1929) is an Australian company director and advocate for women's pay and employment equity and seniors' rights. In 1986, she was the founding director of the Affirmative Action Agency and, since 2011, has served on the board of National Seniors Australia Limited.

== Education ==
Pratt studied at the University of Sydney and graduated with a Bachelor of Arts and diploma of social studies, having won a scholarship from the Canteens Trust Fund.

== Career ==
Pratt's working life began when she was 35 years old, married and raising four children and has continued into her nineties.

Pratt was employed by CSR Limited in 1976 to assist its general manager "to initiate some cultural change". While there, she introduced English language classes to help the migrant workers better understand their instructions and the OH&S requirements. She was personnel manager in CSR's Oil and Gas division.

Pratt was appointed inaugural director of the Affirmative Action Agency, which was established under the Commonwealth Affirmative Action (Equal Employment Opportunity for Women) Act 1986. She served as director from 1986 to 1994. At the end of the first reporting period in 1988, Pratt found that all 67 tertiary institutions and 230 of the 233 organisations employing more than 1,000 staff had submitted their reports in compliance with the legislation. In 1989, companies with more than 500 staff were to report their affirmative action progress, while a year later the cap was lowered to more than 100 staff. Failure to comply resulted in organisations being named in Parliament. In 1992, Paul Keating announced that Federal Government contracts would only be let to organisations complying with the affirmative action legislation. At the same time not-for-profit bodies were brought into its scope, pleasing Pratt as so many volunteer organisations are staffed by women. In 1993 she lobbied for greater funding to be given to tertiary institutions who were performing well in implementing their affirmative action plans, while businesses who failed to comply were prohibited from receiving government grants. She retired from the Affirmative Action Agency the day before her 65th birthday in 1994.

She was appointed to the interim board to oversee Defence Force housing in 1986 and, following its inception, to the board of Defence Housing Authority. The Australian Defence Force (ADF) commissioned Pratt to review their personnel and family support services in 1994 and her report led to the establishment of the Defence Community Organisation, unifying the work of four support organisations. In 2000 she led a review of the ADF's pay arrangements which reported 20 recommendations.

She chaired the Australian Bravery Decorations Council in 2004–2006. In 2009 she was a visiting professor and later an adjunct professor at the Macquarie Graduate School of Management.

Pratt has served on the board of National Seniors Australia Limited since her appointment in October 2011. She was a member of the New South Wales Ministerial Advisory Committee on Ageing, stepping down in 2019.

== Awards and recognition ==
In the 1990 Queen's Birthday Honours, Pratt was made a Member of the Order of Australia for her work towards women's equal employment opportunities. She was promoted to Officer of the Order of Australia in 2011 for "distinguished service to higher education and to the community, particularly as a leader in the area of equal employment opportunity and to industrial relations policy, through significant contributions to boards and advisory committees, and as a mentor and role model".

She was awarded the Centenary Medal in 2000 in recognition of her contribution to higher education.

She was elected an honorary fellow of Macquarie University in 1993 and received a Doctor of Letters honoris causa from that university in 2000.
