= Adolf Löblich =

Austrian rower

Personal information
- Nationality: Austrian
- Born: 14 March 1938 (age 87); Vienna, Nazi Germany

Sport
- Sport: Rowing

Adolf Löblich (born 14 March 1938) is an Austrian rower. He competed in the men's double sculls event at the 1960 Summer Olympics.
