= George Davenport (cricketer) =

English cricketer

Personal information
- Full name: George Davenport
- Born: 5 May 1860; Nantwich, Cheshire, England
- Died: 4 October 1902 (aged 42); Nantwich, Cheshire, England
- Batting: Right-handed
- Bowling: Right-arm medium
- Role: Wicket-keeper

Domestic team information
- Years: Team
- 1885–1896: Marylebone Cricket Club
- 1895: Cheshire

Career statistics
Competition	First-class
Matches	27
Runs scored	625
Batting average	16.44
100s/50s	1/1
Top score	101*
Catches/stumpings	22/12
- Source: Cricinfo, 25 February 2019

George Davenport (5 May 1860 – 4 October 1902) was an English first-class cricketer made 27 appearances in first-class cricket. He was mostly for the Marylebone Cricket Club (MCC), with whom he was employed as a groundsman at their Lord's home.

== Life and first-class cricket ==
Davenport was born in Nantwich. He was employed as a groundsman at Lord's for many years. His debut in first-class cricket came for the North of England in the North v South fixture of 1884 at Lord's. He made four first-class appearances for the Marylebone Cricket Club (MCC) in 1885, as well as appearing again in the North v South fixture. He played in three matches for the MCC in 1886, as well as appearing in the North v South fixture and for CI Thornton's XI against the touring Australians. Davenport played three first-class matches in 1887, appearing once more in the North v South fixture, as well as for the MCC and the Players of the North in the Players of the South versus Players of the North match. He appeared once for the MCC in 1888, before making four appearances for the club in 1889.

He continued to play first-class cricket for the MCC into the early 1890s, making two appearances in 1890, two in 1891 and one in 1893. His final first-class appearances came in 1895 and 1896, when he made three more appearances for the MCC. Making a total of 27 appearances in first-class cricket, mostly as a wicket-keeper, Davenport scored 625 runs at an average of 16.44. He made one century, which he made against Hampshire in 1885 at Southampton. He played minor counties cricket for Cheshire in the 1895 Minor Counties Championship, including playing in Cheshire's inaugural match in the competition against Staffordshire.

Davenport also stood as an umpire in two first-class matches, separated by a period of over a decade. He died at Nantwich in October 1902, aged 42.
