= Arthur Davenport (priest) =

Anglican priest

Arthur Davenport (21 April 1818 - 28 February 1907) was an Anglican priest in Australia during the nineteenth century.

Tancred was born in the City of London and educated at Merchant Taylors' School and Christ's College, Cambridge. After a curacy in Ipswich he travelled to Tasmania. Davenport was Vicar of Hobart from 1846 to 1880; and Archdeacon of Hobart from 1880 to 1888. He then became Canon of St. David's Cathedral until his retirement in 1892.

His grandson, Arthur Davenport, was awarded the Military Cross during World War One.
