= Perica Vlašić =

Croatian rower (1932–2004)

Personal information
- Born: 2 June 1932 Vela Luka
- Died: 12 August 2004 (aged 72)

Sport
- Sport: Rowing
- Club: Mornar Club
Medal record
Men's rowing
Representing Yugoslavia
European Rowing Championships
Gold medal – first place	1953 Copenhagen	Single sculls
Bronze medal – third place	1955 Ghent	Double sculls

Perica Vlašić (2 June 1932 – 12 August 2004) was a Croatian rower who competed for Yugoslavia at the 1956 Summer Olympics and at the 1960 Summer Olympics. He also competed in seven European Rowing Championships and won eight consecutive Yugoslav championships in the single scull, as well as seven double scull national championships.

== Biography ==
Perica Vlašić was born in Vela Luka on the island of Korčula in Croatia. In 1947, he began rowing for VK Ošjak, a local rowing club that was founded in the same year. Racing for the club in a coxed four, he had four consecutive wins at youth level in the Croatian national championships from 1948 to 1951 although in 1950 he turned to sculling. In 1952, he went into compulsory military service in the Yugoslav Army, and served in Pula, where he was spotted by Luka Marasović the rowing coach. Marasović persuaded him to join HVK Mornar, and in 1953, he won the single scull for Mornar in the Croatian championship. He went on to win the Yugoslav national championship in single scull as well as double scull, paired with Stevan Vaci, a rower from the VK Tamiš club based in Pančevo. He entered the Single scull in the European championship and finished first in the final on 18 August 1953 ahead of Teodor Kocerka of Poland. He could achieve a very fast rowing rate of 58 strokes per minute. He won the Sportske novosti Sportsman of the Year award in 1953.

In 1954, Vlašić went on a one-month tour round Europe and competed in several races in borrowed boats. He won at Duisburg and then at Groningen, and won the Diamond Challenge Sculls (the premier singles sculls event) at the Henley Royal Regatta in England, rowing for the Mornar Club, he beat Swiss rower Alain Colomb in the final. He had arrived in London a day before the competition without a trainer or boat, and borrowed a boat from an English trainer to compete.

Vlašić competed in the single scull rowing for Yugoslavia at the 1956 Summer Olympics. Four years later, he partnered Joža Lovec in the double scull rowing for Yugoslavia at the 1960 Summer Olympics. Vlašić won eight consecutive Yugoslav championships in scull, as well as seven double scull national championships, in six of which he was paired with Nikola Lučin.

By the end of his career, Vlašić had won around 40 races in international competitions, and another 40 in national championships in single scull and double scull races. In 1995, Vlašić was awarded the Croatian Franjo Bučar State Award for Sport.

Awards
Preceded by Franjo Mihalić	Yugoslav Sportsman of the Year; 1953	Succeeded by Žarko Dolinar
