= Gérard Higny =

Belgian rower

Personal information
- Born: 20 August 1931 Liège, Belgium
- Died: 7 February 1997 (aged 65)
- Height: 1.88 m (6 ft 2 in)
- Weight: 90 kg (200 lb)

Sport
- Sport: Rowing
- Club: Union Nautique de Liege
Medal record
Representing Belgium
European Rowing Championships
Bronze medal – third place	1957 Duisburg	Double sculls

Gérard Higny (20 August 1931 – 7 February 1997) was a Belgian rower. He competed at the 1960 and 1964 Summer Olympics in the double sculls event, with Jean-Marie Lemaire and Michel De Meulemeester, and finished in sixth and ninth place, respectively. Higny won a bronze medal at the 1957 European Championships, together with Henri Steenacker.
