= Harald Kråkenes =

Norwegian rower

Medal record

Representing Norway

Men's rowing

Olympic Games
Bronze medal – third place	1948 London	Eight

European Rowing Championships
Bronze medal – third place	1949 Amsterdam	Four

Harald Kråkenes (8 July 1926 – 14 November 2004) was a Norwegian competition rower and Olympic medalist. He received a bronze medal in the men's eight at the 1948 Summer Olympics, as a member of the Norwegian team. His brother Thorstein was a member of the same Olympic bronze team. His brother Sverre is also a competition rower, who participated in the 1952 and 1960 Olympic games.

Kråkenes won a bronze medal in coxless four at the 1949 European championships. He participated in fours at the 1952 Summer Olympics, and in double sculls at the 1960 Summer Olympics.

== Personal life ==
Kråkenes was born in Fana Municipality on 8 July 1926. He was a brother of Sverre Kråkenes, and a brother of Thorstein Kråkenes.

He died in Voss Municipality on 14 November 2004.
