= Maximilian Leopold Loeblich =

Austrian entrepreneur (1901-1984)

- Born: November 16, 1901; Vienna, Austria
- Died: March 1, 1984 (aged 82); Vienna
- Occupation(s): Entrepreneur, coppersmith, and engineer
- Known for: President of Austrian heating manufacturer Löblich & Co.
- Spouse: Elisabeth Goetz
- Children: 3

Maximilian Leopold Löblich (born 16 November 1901 in Vienna; died 1 March 1984) was an Austrian entrepreneur, coppersmith, engineer and president of Löblich & Co., the oldest heating manufacturer in Austria.

== Early life ==
Max Loeblich, son of the director of the Vienna Local Railway Company (Wiener Lokalbahnen), went to boarding-school in Horn, Lower Austria, then finished the poly-technicum in Vienna and became a coppersmith master there.

== Career ==
From 1924 to 1927 he worked as a technical designer in a German manufacturing company, before becoming responsible for product design and engineering at Loeblich & Co.

In 1935 he took over the management of the Leopold Loeblich Metal Works from his uncle Leopold Löblich, together with his brother, the engineer Franz Loeblich. The Federal Union of Coppersmiths became under Nazi rule (1938–1945) part of a German craftsmanship representation, in which Loeblich (despite not being a member of the Nazi Party), was elected chairman, representing the coppersmiths. After the death of his brother in the last days of World War II, he continued the business on his own.

As engineer and designer of new types of heating boilers (Rohleder-system welded smoke-pipe boilers with atmospheric burners (Polidoro, Italy), and Brahma-system electro-mechanical gas valves) he managed to expand the business among the leading producers in Europe and was the leader in Austria's market for gas heaters in the 1950s. In due course, gas became the most popular form of energy for household heating in Austria and many countries in Europe.

Among Loeblich's customers were Austria's federal presidents Adolf Schärf, Franz Jonas, Kurt Waldheim, and Thomas Klestil, and Hungarian president János Kádár, prime minister Bruno Kreisky, and vice-chancellor Alois Mock. Loeblich obtained many public awards during this period.

A few years before his death in 1984 he passed over the management of the company to his son Max Wolfgang Loeblich (b. 1931) and his nephew, engineer Adolf Loeblich (b. 1938), who continued the business and started many international cooperations, distribution and service agreements in the fields of heating and catering systems.

== Family ==
Married to Elisabeth Goetz (1899–1987), Loeblich was the father of three children: Maria, Konstanze, and Max. Loeblich died in 1984 and is buried in Weidling near Vienna in the family grave, the first work of architect Robert Oerley.
