= William Bromley-Davenport =

William Bromley-Davenport may refer to:

- William Bromley-Davenport (1821–1884), British MP for Warwickshire North
- William Bromley-Davenport (British Army officer) (1862–1949), British soldier, footballer and Conservative politician
- William Bromley-Davenport (Lord Lieutenant) (born 1935), High Sheriff of Cheshire & Lord Lieutenant of Cheshire, 1990–2010

== See also ==
- William Bromley (disambiguation)
