= Bernard Davenport =

Irish ambassador (1939–2018)

Bernard Davenport (19 August 1939 – 11 June 2018) was an Irish Ambassador.

Davenport was born in Dublin. He graduated from Trinity College Dublin, in 1963 in economics and politics, followed by an MA in economics. He joined the Dublin section of The Economist's Economic Intelligence Unit under Garret FitzGerald.

In 1968 he joined the Department of Foreign Affairs as 3rd secretary. From 1978 to 1983 he served as counsellor at the U.N.

He became ambassador to Argentina in 1989. During his tenure, on St. Patrick's Day 1992, an hour and a half after he had left the embassy to attend St. Patrick's day functions, a bomb exploded at the nearby Israeli Embassy. The Irish Embassy was empty, but the interior was wrecked.

In 1996 he returned to headquarters to work in the Anglo-Irish Division. During his time at the U.N. he had become very friendly with Martti Ahtisaari, then deputy secretary general of the U.N. and later President of Finland. This contact was helpful in later years when Ahtessaari was instrumental in getting former Finnish Prime Minister, Harri Holkieri, to be part of the troika with U.S. Senator George Mitchell and retired Canadian General John de Chastelain which engaged with paramilitaries on both sides in Northern Ireland which paved the way for the Belfast Agreement in 1998.

He was one of the key people in the run-up to that agreement. As one of the few people in the Anglo-Irish Division with serious U.N. experience, he put a great emphasis on lodging the agreement with the U.N. as an international agreement and was heavily involved with drafting the text to ensure it was compatible with U.N. treaties.

He later served as ambassador to Switzerland. His final posting was to the Holy See.

He presented his Letters of Credence to the Holy See in September 2001. He retired in 2004

== Notes ==
- "The Great Tuam Annual 3", 1992
