= Samuel Davenport =

Samuel Davenport may refer to:

- Samuel Davenport (Australian politician) (1818–1906), Australian settler, landowner, and parliamentarian
- Samuel Davenport (engraver) (1783–1867), English line engraver
- Samuel A. Davenport (1834–1911), politician from Pennsylvania
