= Peter Bakker (rower) =

Dutch rower (born 1934)

Personal information
- Born: Peter Johannes Bakker; 4 August 1934 (age 91) Rotterdam, the Netherlands
- Height: 190 cm (6 ft 3 in)
- Weight: 76 kg (168 lb)

Sport
- Sport: Rowing
Medal record
Men's rowing
Representing the Netherlands
European Championships
Bronze medal – third place	1959 Mâcon	Double scull

Peter Johannes Bakker (born 4 August 1934) is a rower who represented the Netherlands. He competed at the 1960 Summer Olympics in Rome with the men's double sculls where they came fifth.
