= Wink Davenport =

American volleyball player (1942–2022)

Personal information
- Full name: Winthrop Davenport Jr.
- Born: April 12, 1942; Binghamton, New York, U.S.
- Died: May 3, 2022 (aged 80)
- Hometown: Binghamton, New York, U.S.
- Height: 6 ft 7 in (2.01 m)
- Weight: 220 lb (100 kg; 15 st 10 lb)
- Education: Wesleyan University

Career
Teams
	Westside Junior College

National team
United States
Medal record
Men's volleyball
Representing the United States
Pan American Games
Gold medal – first place	1967 Winnipeg	Team

Winthrop "Wink" Davenport Jr. (April 12, 1942 – May 3, 2022) was an American lead volleyball official, former college basketball player, former National team volleyball player. He is best remembered as the most prominent volleyball official in the United States, arising from his frequent service as a volleyball referee officiating the nation's most important matches. He is a holder of U.S.A. Volleyball's 1996 Wilbur H. Peck Referee – Emeritus Award.

== Biography ==
Davenport was born in Binghamton, New York on April 12, 1942, the second of three children of Winthrop Davenport and the former Elizabeth Mae Langford. Davenport has an older brother David Andrus Davenport (born 1939) and had a younger sister, Edith Lynne Davenport (1948 - 2014). He was baptized at First Presbyterian Church in Binghamton on June 20, 1943. He was awarded a scholarship to play basketball at Wesleyan, where he had a distinguished college career. United Press International named him first-team small college all-New England. He was captain of the basketball team his senior year. He left Wesleyan holding the school record for most points scored in a game (44) and for career scoring average (19.6). In addition to basketball, Davenport lettered twice as a member of the Wesleyan golf team. At Wesleyan he joined Delta Kappa Epsilon fraternity.

In the late 1950s Davenport became active playing AAU volleyball at a YMCA in his hometown of Binghamton, New York. In 1966 he moved to Santa Monica, California, where he joined the Santa Monica Volleyball club team. The team was one of the top amateur teams in the nation, and competed at the USVBA Open Nationals. Following the tournament Davenport was selected for the US National Men's Volleyball Team. He competed at the 1967 Pan American Games, where the team won the gold medal. In 1968 he played on the National Team when it competed at the Summer Olympics in Mexico City. The following year, he was again selected to play on the National team at the 1969 World Cup. In 1971 Davenport captained Santa Monica's USVBA club team, which won the USVBA National Championship in the Men's Open Division. He earned All-America honors at the tournament. Davenport remained a member of the US National team through 1971.

Davenport retired from playing competitively at the end of 1971 due to chronic knee problems. However his involvement in the game continued as an official. In this capacity he made his largest contribution to the sport. Davenport earned his national certification in 1971, and soon was considered one of the nation's top officials. He officiated at the USA Cup, the World Junior Championships, the World Championships, the World Cup and the Olympics. Davenport officiated at 11 NCAA Men's National Collegiate Volleyball Championships and six NCAA Division I Women's Volleyball Championships from 1980 through 1990. He also officiated at the 1984 Olympic Games in Los Angeles. Davenport served as a board member of the U.S. Volleyball Association from 1971 through 1977, and served as vice president of the USVBA from 1973 through 1976. He was the secretary of the international referees committee of Fédération Internationale de Volleyball from 1992 through 1996. Davenport retired as an active official in 1995, and has continued on in emeritus status since 1996. Davenport was referee delegate to the Olympic games held in Atlanta in 1996.

Davenport was married and has three children. He met his wife, Ann L. Jeberjahn, on the volleyball courts in Southern California. The couple married in Los Angeles on April 19, 1970. Ann became president of the Southern California Volleyball Association. His oldest two daughters, Leiann and Shannon, both went to college on volleyball scholarships, Leiann at UC Irvine and Shannon at St. Mary's College. Davenport's youngest daughter, Lindsay, became a tennis player, winning the 1996 Olympic gold medal and three Grand Slam singles titles: the US Open (1998), Wimbledon (1999), and the Australian Open (2000).

In 1996 Davenport was selected for U.S.A. Volleyball's Wilbur H. Peck Referee – Emeritus Award. He was inducted into the Wesleyan Hall of Fame in 2009. Davenport died on May 3, 2022, at the age of 80.
