= Equal Opportunity for Women in the Workplace Agency =

The Equal Opportunity for Women in the Workplace Agency (EOWA) was an Australian Government agency. It was a statutory authority located within the then existing Australian Commonwealth Department of Families, Housing, Community Services and Indigenous Affairs (FaHCSIA).

== History and description ==
EOWA's role was to administer the Equal Opportunity for Women in the Workplace Act 1999, passed by the Parliament of Australia in November 2012, and through education, assist organisations to achieve equal opportunity for women. Outlined in Part III Section 10 of the Act, the Agency was primarily a regulatory body, annually monitoring the reporting of eligible Australian organisations on equal opportunity for women in their workplaces. The Agency also had responsibility to undertake research, educational and other programs, and more generally promote the understanding of equal opportunity for women in the workplace.

In 2012, the Equal Opportunity for Women in the Workplace Act 1999 was replaced by the Workplace Gender Equality Act 2012. The passing of the new legislation meant that the Equal Opportunity for Women in the Workplace Agency was renamed the Workplace Gender Equality Agency.

The "Employer of Choice for Women" (EOCFW) citation was announced annually from the 2001 inaugural list of 55 organisations, and by 2012, the list had grown to 125 organisations.

== Personnel ==
From 1999 to 2004, Fiona Krautil was the agency's director.
