= Emily Davenport =

American inventor (1810–1862)

Emily Goss Davenport
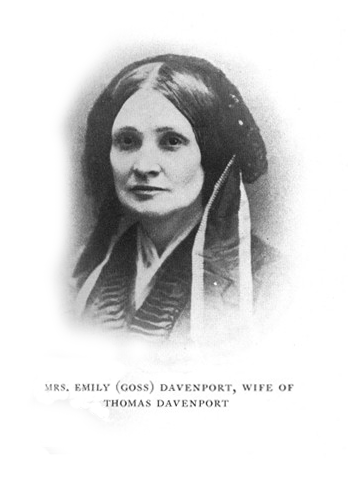
- Born: Emily Goss; April 29, 1810; Brandon, Vermont
- Died: October 5, 1862 (aged 52); Brandon, Vermont
- Citizenship: American
- Known for: inventing the electric motor
- Spouse(s): Thomas Davenport; John Mosely Weeks
- Children: 2

Emily Goss Davenport Weeks (April 29, 1810 – October 5, 1862) was an American inventor from Vermont. Together with her husband Thomas Davenport, she invented an electric motor and electric locomotive around 1834.

Davenport kept detailed notes and actively contributed to the process of the inventions. Needing to insulate the motor's iron core, Davenport cut her wedding dress into strips of silk to insulate the wire windings. She is also credited with the idea of using mercury as a conductor, enabling the motor to function for the first time. With her husband Thomas, and colleague Orange Smalley, she received the first American patent on an electric machine in 1837, U. S. Patent No. 132. This electric motor was used in 1840 to print The Electro-Magnet, and Mechanics Intelligencer - the first newspaper printed using electricity.

She was born Emily Goss in Brandon Vermont, one of five children born to Rufus Goss a local merchant and Anna Green. She and Thomas Davenport lived in Salisbury, Vermont and had two children, George Daniel Davenport and Willard Goss Davenport. Thomas Davenport died in 1851 and Emily moved to Middlebury. On January 6, 1856 she married John Mosely Weeks in Salisbury, the inventor of the Vermont beehive. She died in 1862 and is buried in Pine Hill Cemetery in Brandon, Vermont.
