= Clive Fairbairn =

Australian cricketer

Personal information
- Born: 25 August 1919; Melbourne, Australia
- Died: 12 May 2010 (aged 90); Melbourne, Australia

Domestic team information
- Years: Team
- 1948: Victoria
- Source: Cricinfo, 29 November 2015

Clive Lindsay Fairbairn OAM (25 August 1919 – 12 May 2010), who went by the nickname "Fairy", was an Australian cricketer. He played one first-class cricket match for Victoria in 1948, but spent most of his 1936-1957 career playing for the Melbourne Cricket Club (MCC). He went on to manage the MCC for nearly forty years before being compulsorily retired in 1990. The following year he was given honorary lifetime membership of the MCC.

During the second world war Fairbairn served with Australian forces at Tobruk and El Alamein in North Africa, and in New Guinea and Borneo as part of the South-West Pacific campaign.

Fairbairn was awarded the Medal of the Order of Australia in 1990 for "service to the sport of cricket".

== See also ==
- List of Victoria first-class cricketers
