= Sharper =

Older term for a con-artist

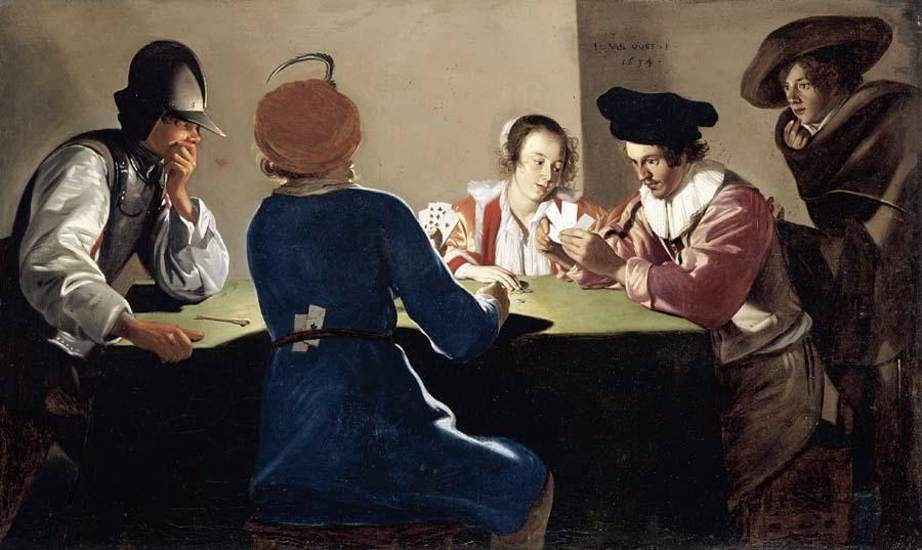
The Card-sharpers by Jacob van Oost, 1634

The term sharper is an older word, common since the seventeenth-century, for a thief who uses trickery to part an owner with his or her money or other possessions. Sharpers vary from what are now known as con-men by virtue of the simplicity of their cons, which often were impromptu, rather than carefully orchestrated, though those certainly happened as well. The 1737 Dictionary of Thieving Slang defines a sharper as "A Cheat, One who lives by his wits". The word "rook" could occur with a similar meaning. In the nineteenth century, and into today, "sharper" has become more closely associated with gambling.

Sharpers had a romantic reputation in the eighteenth-century: admirers valued them as imaginative figures for their perceived social independence and ability to create new social networks of gangs. The appeal of an independent society, operating outside the law, has been imaginatively evocative for centuries, but in eighteenth-century London philosophical thought – influenced by Thomas Hobbes (1588–1679) and by the new formulations of social contract by Rousseau (1712–1778) – the romanticization of thievery reached new levels. John Gay's The Beggar's Opera (1728) and Henry Fielding's novel Jonathan Wild (1743) provide just two examples of sharpers as heroes – in these cases, to provide satirical ammunition against Robert Walpole, the British Prime Minister (in office: 1721 to 1742).

== See also ==
- Card sharp
