= Joža Lovec =

Yugoslav rower

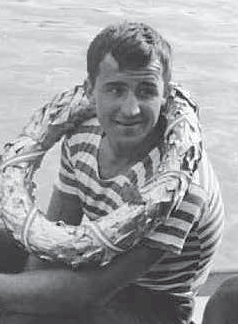

Personal information
- Born: 12 February 1939 (age 87) Maribor, Kingdom of Yugoslavia
- Height: 174 cm (5 ft 9 in)
- Weight: 80 kg (176 lb)

Sport
- Sport: Rowing
- Club: HVK Mornar, Split

Joža Lovec (also Jože Lovec, born 12 February 1939) is a retired Yugoslav rower. Together with Perica Vlašić he competed in the double sculls at the 1960 Summer Olympics, but failed to reach the final.

Lovec took up rowing in his teens, and competed while serving in the Yugoslav Navy in 1959–1961. After retiring from competitions in 1962 he left Yugoslavia with his wife Anica. They briefly stayed in Austria, then went to Australia, and five years later to the United States. Lovec became a successful businessman in Massachusetts, and then moved to Florida. In his spare time he sailed the Atlantic.
