= Winifred Davenport =

Australian marine and civil engineer (1924–2003)

Marjory Winifred Davenport
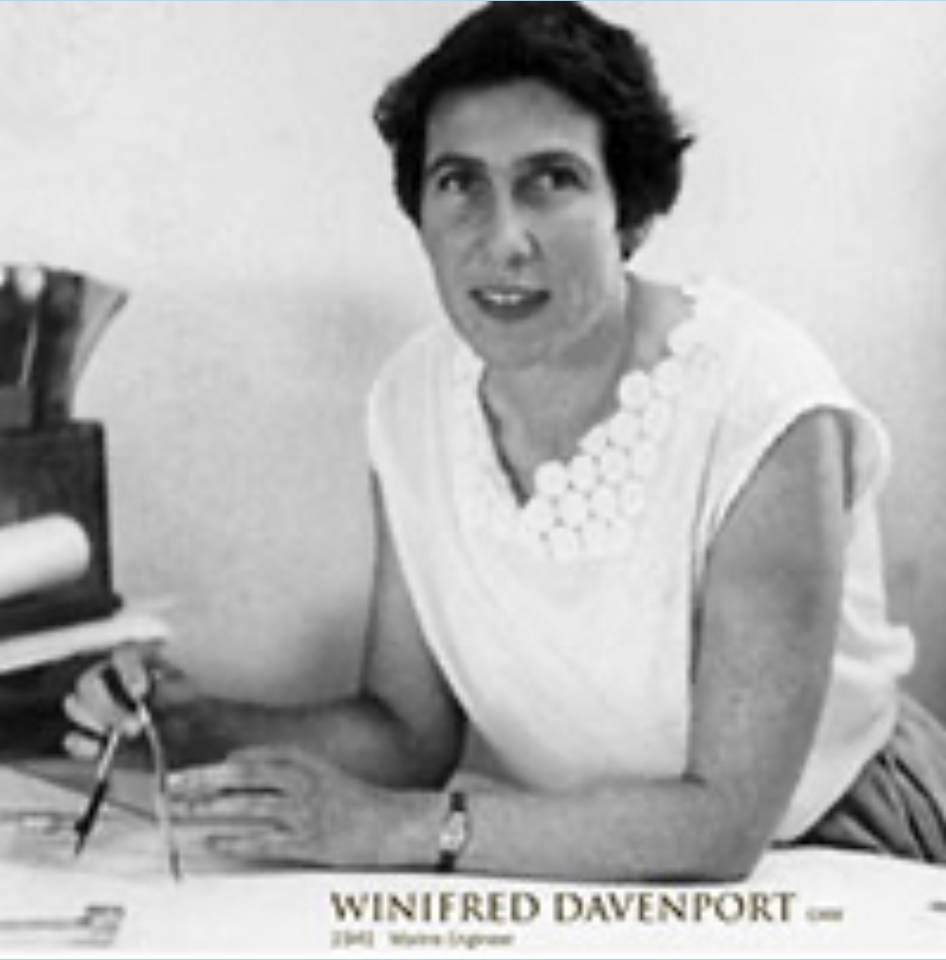
- Davenport in 1960
- Born: February 18, 1924
- Died: May 13, 2003 (aged 79)
- Scientific career
- Fields: Engineering
- Workplaces: Queensland Harbours and Marine Department

Marjory Winifred Davenport (18 February 1924 – 13 May 2003) was an Australian marine and civil engineer. Known by her middle name, Winifred Davenport, she is recognised as Australia's first female qualified engineer from Queensland, completing her diploma in Mechanical and Electrical Engineering in 1946. Davenport played a significant role in the development of Queensland's marine infrastructure and later became a Fellow of the Institution of Engineers Australia by special invitation. She worked extensively with the Queensland Harbours and Marine Department and was involved in major projects, including the development of Manly Boat Harbour and the design of the hydrographic survey vessel Trigla. In 1990, she was appointed a Member (AM) of the Order of Australia for her service to marine and civil engineering.

== Early life and education ==
Marjory Winifred Davenport was born on 18 February 1924 in Brisbane, Queensland, Australia, to Mr. and Mrs. Douglas Davenport of Ipswich Road, Moorooka. She was diagnosed with chronic asthma throughout her life, but still achieved strong academic results in her scholarship, junior, and senior examinations. She attended Yeronga State School, followed by four years at St Aidan's School where she studied freehand drawing and mathematics. Her interest in engineering and drafting was influenced by her father, a professional draftsman. She took to drawing with his tools at a young age.

== Career and research ==
Early engineering

According to her cousin, Pamela Davenport, she demonstrated a strong aptitude for mathematics which contributed to her pursuit of engineering studies. After completing her years in St Aidan's School, Davenport undertook employment while studying part-time at the Brisbane Central Technical College. She took night classes in physics, applied mechanics, heat engines and electricity, ultimately qualifying with a diploma in Mechanical and Electrical Engineering in 1946 at the age of 22. In 1942, at the age of 18, Davenport began her career as an indentured cadet draftswoman at the Evans Deakin shipyard at Kangaroo Point. Her appointment occurred during World War II, when labour shortages allowed women to enter traditionally male-dominated technical roles. At Evans Deakin, she worked primarily on shipbuilding projects, producing detailed structural drawings for steel deck and hull plates. Her work was highly regarded by senior staff, including the company's chief draftsman, Mr L. H. McDonald, who noted that her output matched that expected of experienced draftsmen. While employed at the shipyard, she continued her engineering studies, completing her diploma in 1946 and becoming Australia's first qualified female engineer from Queensland.

Marine engineering and public service

Following her qualification, Davenport developed a particular interest in marine engineering. She gained practical experience working aboard vessels, including time spent in engine rooms and on the bridge of ships such as the SS Koopa and MV Mirimar. This experience contributed to her later attainment of a Master Mariner's Certificate. In 1950, Davenport joined the Queensland Harbours and Marine Department in Queensland as an associate engineer. She would work there until her retirement in 1989. In 1951, she was named as the first female corporate member of the Institution of Engineers making her qualify to use the title of Chartered Engineer. In 1958 she became a member of the Royal Institute of Naval Architects. In 1960, she designed and supervised the construction of the hydrographic survey vessel Trigla and was appointed the Official Measurer in Queensland for Olympic class yachts.

One of her most enduring contributions was her involvement in the development of Manly Boat Harbour in Brisbane, which later became the largest boat harbour on Australia's east coast and a key component of Queensland's marine tourism infrastructure.

She wrote an article where she discussed women's participation in professional fields, drawing on her experiences in engineering and advocating for equal opportunity based on interest and ability.

She wrote a book that documents the historical development of Queensland's ports and harbours, focusing on engineering, maritime trade and coastal infrastructure to explain how they shaped its economic and social history. The timeline of the book is from early colonial settlement through the late twentieth century. It has been cited as a valuable reference on Queensland's maritime history. Davenport retired from the Harbours and Marine Department in 1989.

== Personal life and death ==
Davenport never married and had no children. At the age of 79, she passed away on May 13th, 2003 in Brisbane, Queensland at Redland Hospital.

== Publications ==
Davenport authored both technical and reflective works during her career.

=== Books ===
- Harbours and Marine: Port and Harbour Development in Queensland from 1824 to 1985
- Early shipping in Moreton Bay, compiled by Winifred Davenport and Betty Moran.

=== Articles ===
- "A Place for Women in Professions" (1979)

== Awards and honours ==
1951: First Female Member of the Institution of Engineers, Australia (AMIEAust).

1958: Member of the Royal Institution of Naval Architects.

1989: The Winifred Davenport Centre was named in her honour at the Queensland Maritime Museum

1990: Member of the Order of Australia (AM) for service to marine and civil engineering

1991: Fellow of the Institution of Engineers Australia (FIEAust) by special invitation of the council
