= Cycling at the 1960 Summer Olympics – Men's sprint =

Cycling at the Olympics

Men's sprint at the Games of the XVII Olympiad
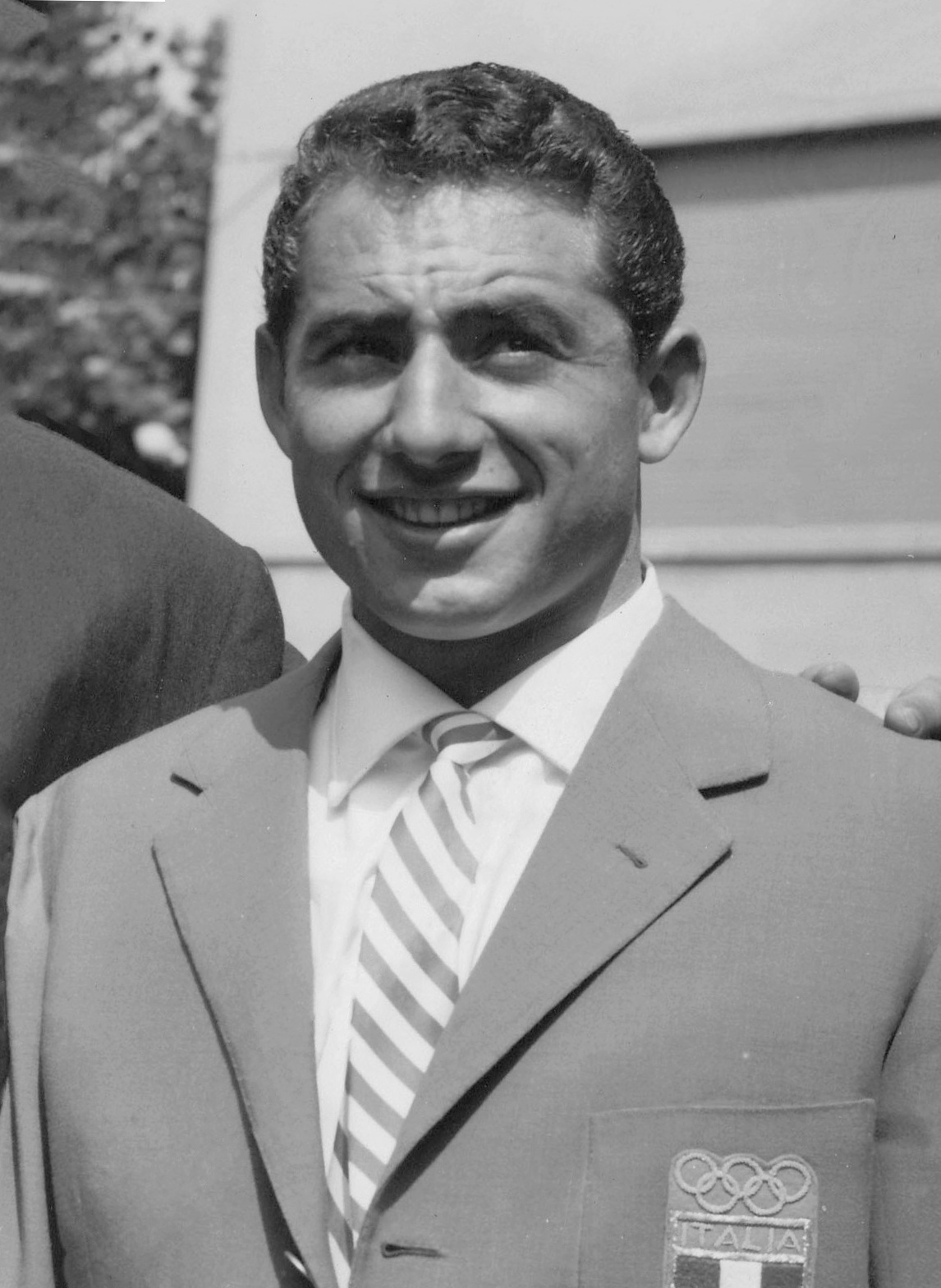
- Sante Gaiardoni
- Venue: Olympic Velodrome, Rome
- Dates: 26–29 August 1960
- Competitors: 30 from 18 nations

Medalists
1st place, gold medalist(s)		Sante Gaiardoni; Italy
2nd place, silver medalist(s)		Leo Sterckx; Belgium
3rd place, bronze medalist(s)		Valentino Gasparella; Italy

The men's sprint at the 1960 Summer Olympics in Rome, Italy was held on 26 to 29 August 1960. There were 30 participants from 18 nations. For the first time since 1924, nations were allowed to have more than one competitor each (the limit was raised to two); for the first time since 1924, one nation took multiple medals. Italians Sante Gaiardoni and Valentino Gasparella won gold and bronze, giving Italy a four-Games podium streak with three total gold medals—second all-time behind France's five. Leo Sterckx's silver was Belgium's first medal in the men's sprint.

== Background ==
This was the 12th appearance of the event, which has been held at every Summer Olympics except 1904 and 1912. None of the quarterfinalists from 1956 returned. The Italian team was favored, with Valentino Gasparella (the 1958 and 1959 world champion) and Sante Gaiardoni (the 1960 world champion, and runner-up to Gasparella in both previous years).

The British West Indies made its debut in the men's sprint; East and West Germany competed as the United Team of Germany. France made its 12th appearance, the only nation to have competed at every appearance of the event.

== Competition format ==
Sprint cycling involves a series of head-to-head matches. The 1960 competition involved nine rounds: heats, a two-round repechage, 1/8 finals, another two-round repechage, quarterfinals, semifinals, and finals.

- Heats: The 37 entrants were divided into 12 heats, most of 3 cyclists but one of 4 cyclists. After 7 withdrawals, no heat had more than 3 cyclists; many had 2 and one heat had only 1 competitor. The winner of each heat advanced directly to the 1/8 finals (12 cyclists), while all other cyclists who competed were sent to the first repechage (18 cyclists).
- Repechage 1: This was a two-round repechage. The first round consisted of 9 heats of 2 cyclists. The winners advanced to the second round of the repechage, while the losers were eliminated. The second round had 3 heats of 3 cyclists each; the top 2 in each heat joined the main competition again at the 1/8 finals (6 cyclists) while the 3rd-place rider in each heat was eliminated.
- 1/8 finals: The 18 cyclists who advanced through the heats or the first repechage competed in a 1/8 finals round. There were 6 heats in this round, with 3 cyclists in each. The top cyclist in each heat advanced to the quarterfinals (6 cyclists), while the other 2 in each heat went to the second repechage (12 cyclists).
- Repechage 2: This was another two-round repechage, but with a different format. This repechage began with 4 heats of 3 cyclists each. The top cyclist in each heat advanced to the second round, while the other 2 cyclists in each heat were eliminated. The second round of this repechage featured 2 heats of 2 cyclists each, with the winners advancing to the quarterfinals and the losers eliminated.
- Quarterfinals: Beginning with the quarterfinals, all matches were one-on-one competitions and were held in best-of-three format. There were 4 quarterfinals, with the winner of each advancing to the semifinals and the loser eliminated.
- Semifinals: The two semifinals provided for advancement to the gold medal final for winners and to the bronze medal final for losers.
- Finals: Both a gold medal final and a bronze medal final were held.

== Records ==
The records for the sprint are 200 metre flying time trial records, kept for the qualifying round in later Games as well as for the finish of races.

World record	Sante Gaiardoni (ITA)	11.0	Rome, Italy	30 July 1960
Olympic record	Dick Ploog (AUS)	11.4	Melbourne, Australia	3 December 1956

Leo Sterckx matched the Olympic record of 11.4 seconds in the last 200 metres of the third heat in round 1. Anésio Argenton tied it as well, in heat 4 of the 1/8 finals. Sterckx broke it with 11.3 seconds in the next heat. Sante Gaiardoni matched Sterckx's new record in the second race of the fourth quarterfinal. Valentino Gasparella dropped the record a further two-tenths of a second, to 11.1 seconds, in the first race of the first semifinal. Gaiardoni matched him in the first race of the final.

== Schedule ==
All times are Central European Time (UTC+1)

Date	Time	Round
Friday, 26 August 1960	"afternoon" "night"	Round 1 First repechage heats First repechage finals 1/8 finals Second repechage heats Second repechage finals
Saturday, 27 August 1960	"afternoon"	Quarterfinals
Monday, 29 August 1960	"night"	Semifinals; Finals

== Results ==
=== Round 1 ===
==== Heat 1 ====
Rank	Cyclist	Nation	Time	Notes
1	Sante Gaiardoni	Italy	11.7	Q
2	Clyde Rimple	British West Indies	N/A	R
–	Mohamed Touati	Tunisia	DNS	

==== Heat 2 ====
Rank	Cyclist	Nation	Time	Notes
1	Ron Baensch	Australia	11.7	Q
–	K. Melby	Denmark	DNS	
–	Les Haupt	South Africa	DNS	

==== Heat 3 ====
Rank	Cyclist	Nation	Time	Notes
1	Leo Sterckx	Belgium	11.4	Q
2	Anésio Argenton	Brazil	N/A	R
–	P. Tache	Romania	DNS	

==== Heat 4 ====
Rank	Cyclist	Nation	Time	Notes
1	Mario Vanegas	Colombia	11.7	Q
2	Karl Barton	Great Britain	N/A	R
–	V. Oprea	Romania	DNS	

==== Heat 5 ====
Rank	Cyclist	Nation	Time	Notes
1	Valentino Gasparella	Italy	11.7	Q
2	José María Errandonea	Spain	N/A	R
3	Martin McKay	Ireland	N/A	R

==== Heat 6 ====
Rank	Cyclist	Nation	Time	Notes
1	Günter Kaslowski	United Team of Germany	12.0	Q
2	Gilbert De Rieck	Belgium	N/A	R
3	Cenobio Ruiz	Mexico	N/A	R

==== Heat 7 ====
Rank	Cyclist	Nation	Time	Notes
1	André Gruchet	France	11.6	Q
2	Herbert Francis	United States	N/A	R
3	Muhammad Ashiq	Pakistan	N/A	R

==== Heat 8 ====
Rank	Cyclist	Nation	Time	Notes
1	Kurt Rechsteiner	Switzerland	11.7	Q
2	Luis Muciño	Mexico	N/A	R
3	Abdul Razzaq Baloch	Pakistan	N/A	R

==== Heat 9 ====
Rank	Cyclist	Nation	Time	Notes
1	Lloyd Binch	Great Britain	12.0	Q
2	Imants Bodnieks	Soviet Union	N/A	R
3	Piet van der Touw	Netherlands	N/A	R

==== Heat 10 ====
Rank	Cyclist	Nation	Time	Notes
1	Boris Vasilyev	Soviet Union	11.8	Q
2	Francisco Tortellá	Spain	N/A	R
3	Michael Horgan	Ireland	N/A	R

==== Heat 11 ====
Rank	Cyclist	Nation	Time	Notes
1	Antoine Pellegrina	France	12.4	Q
2	Aad de Graaf	Netherlands	N/A	R
–	Diego Calero	Colombia	DNS	

==== Heat 12 ====
Rank	Cyclist	Nation	Time	Notes
1	August Rieke	United Team of Germany	11.9	Q
2	Jackie Simes	United States	N/A	R
3	Paul Nyman	Finland	N/A	R
–	Ian Browne	Australia	DNS	

=== First repechage heats ===
==== First repechage heat 1 ====
Rank	Cyclist	Nation	Time	Notes
1	Anésio Argenton	Brazil	12.3	Q
2	Karl Barton	Great Britain	N/A	

==== First repechage heat 2 ====
Rank	Cyclist	Nation	Time	Notes
1	Cenobio Ruiz	Mexico	12.4	Q
2	Martin McKay	Ireland	N/A	

==== First repechage heat 3 ====
Rank	Cyclist	Nation	Time	Notes
1	Gilbert De Rieck	Belgium	12.4	Q
2	José María Errandonea	Spain	N/A	

==== First repechage heat 4 ====
Rank	Cyclist	Nation	Time	Notes
1	Herbert Francis	United States	12.1	Q
2	Abdul Razzaq Baloch	Pakistan	N/A	

==== First repechage heat 5 ====
Rank	Cyclist	Nation	Time	Notes
1	Luis Muciño	Mexico	12.8	Q
2	Muhammad Ashiq	Pakistan	N/A	

==== First repechage heat 6 ====
Rank	Cyclist	Nation	Time	Notes
1	Imants Bodnieks	Soviet Union	11.7	Q
2	Michael Horgan	Ireland	N/A	

==== First repechage heat 7 ====
Rank	Cyclist	Nation	Time	Notes
1	Piet van der Touw	Netherlands	12.1	Q
2	Francisco Tortellá	Spain	N/A	

==== First repechage heat 8 ====
Rank	Cyclist	Nation	Time	Notes
1	Aad de Graaf	Netherlands	11.6	Q
2	Jackie Simes	United States	N/A	

==== First repechage heat 9 ====
Rank	Cyclist	Nation	Time	Notes
1	Clyde Rimple	British West Indies	12.5	Q
2	Paul Nyman	Finland	N/A	

=== First repechage finals ===
==== First repechage final 1 ====
Rank	Cyclist	Nation	Time	Notes
1	Aad de Graaf	Netherlands	11.8	Q
2	Gilbert De Rieck	Belgium	N/A	Q
3	Cenobio Ruiz	Mexico	N/A	

==== First repechage final 2 ====
Rank	Cyclist	Nation	Time	Notes
1	Imants Bodnieks	Soviet Union	12.5	Q
2	Anésio Argenton	Brazil	N/A	Q
3	Luis Muciño	Mexico	N/A	

==== First repechage final 3 ====
Rank	Cyclist	Nation	Time	Notes
1	Piet van der Touw	Netherlands	11.9	Q
2	Clyde Rimple	British West Indies	N/A	Q
3	Herbert Francis	United States	N/A	

=== 1/8 finals ===
==== 1/8 final heat 1 ====
Rank	Cyclist	Nation	Time	Notes
1	August Rieke	United Team of Germany	11.7	Q
2	Piet van der Touw	Netherlands	N/A	R
3	Boris Vasilyev	Soviet Union	N/A	R

==== 1/8 final heat 2 ====
Rank	Cyclist	Nation	Time	Notes
1	Antoine Pellegrina	France	11.6	Q
2	Kurt Rechsteiner	Switzerland	N/A	R
3	Gilbert De Rieck	Belgium	N/A	R

==== 1/8 final heat 3 ====
Rank	Cyclist	Nation	Time	Notes
1	Lloyd Binch	Great Britain	11.7	Q
2	André Gruchet	France	N/A	R
3	Clyde Rimple	British West Indies	N/A	R

==== 1/8 final heat 4 ====
Gasparella "was retroceded from 1st to 3rd place."

Rank	Cyclist	Nation	Time	Notes
1	Anésio Argenton	Brazil	11.4	Q
2	Ron Baensch	Australia	N/A	R
3	Valentino Gasparella	Italy	N/A	R

==== 1/8 final heat 5 ====
Rank	Cyclist	Nation	Time	Notes
1	Leo Sterckx	Belgium	11.3	Q
2	Aad de Graaf	Netherlands	N/A	R
3	Mario Vanegas	Colombia	N/A	R

==== 1/8 final heat 6 ====
Rank	Cyclist	Nation	Time	Notes
1	Sante Gaiardoni	Italy	11.7	Q
2	Imants Bodnieks	Soviet Union	N/A	R
3	Günter Kaslowski	United Team of Germany	N/A	R

=== Second repechage heats ===
==== Second repechage heat 1 ====
Rank	Cyclist	Nation	Time	Notes
1	Mario Vanegas	Colombia	11.8	Q
2	André Gruchet	France	N/A	
3	Aad de Graaf	Netherlands	N/A	

==== Second repechage heat 2 ====
Rank	Cyclist	Nation	Time	Notes
1	Valentino Gasparella	Italy	11.6	Q
2	Clyde Rimple	British West Indies	N/A	
3	Boris Vasilyev	Soviet Union	N/A	

==== Second repechage heat 3 ====
Rank	Cyclist	Nation	Time	Notes
1	Kurt Rechsteiner	Switzerland	11.5	Q
2	Günter Kaslowski	United Team of Germany	N/A	
3	Gilbert De Rieck	Belgium	N/A	

==== Second repechage heat 4 ====
Rank	Cyclist	Nation	Time	Notes
1	Ron Baensch	Australia	12.1	Q
2	Piet van der Touw	Netherlands	N/A	
3	Imants Bodnieks	Soviet Union	N/A	

=== Second repechage finals ===
==== Second repechage final 1 ====
Rank	Cyclist	Nation	Time	Notes
1	Valentino Gasparella	Italy	11.4	Q
2	Mario Vanegas	Colombia	N/A	

==== Second repechage final 2 ====
Rank	Cyclist	Nation	Time	Notes
1	Ron Baensch	Australia	11.6	Q
2	Kurt Rechsteiner	Switzerland	N/A	

=== Quarterfinals ===
==== Quarterfinal 1 ====
Rank	Cyclist	Nation	Race 1		Race 2		Race 3		Notes
Rank	Cyclist	Nation	Rank	Time	Rank	Time	Rank	Time	Notes
1	Valentino Gasparella	Italy	1	12.0	1	11.7	—N/a		Q
2	Antoine Pellegrina	France	2	N/A	2	N/A	—N/a		

==== Quarterfinal 2 ====
Rank	Cyclist	Nation	Race 1		Race 2		Race 3		Notes
Rank	Cyclist	Nation	Rank	Time	Rank	Time	Rank	Time	Notes
1	Ron Baensch	Australia	1	12.2	1	12.0	—N/a		Q
2	August Rieke	United Team of Germany	2	N/A	2	N/A	—N/a		

==== Quarterfinal 3 ====
Rank	Cyclist	Nation	Race 1		Race 2		Race 3		Notes
Rank	Cyclist	Nation	Rank	Time	Rank	Time	Rank	Time	Notes
1	Leo Sterckx	Belgium	1	11.9	1	11.7	—N/a		Q
2	Lloyd Binch	Great Britain	2	N/A	2	N/A	—N/a		

==== Quarterfinal 4 ====
Rank	Cyclist	Nation	Race 1		Race 2		Race 3		Notes
Rank	Cyclist	Nation	Rank	Time	Rank	Time	Rank	Time	Notes
1	Sante Gaiardoni	Italy	1	11.6	1	11.3	—N/a		Q
2	Anésio Argenton	Brazil	2	N/A	2	N/A	—N/a		

=== Semifinals ===
==== Semifinal 1 ====
Rank	Cyclist	Nation	Race 1		Race 2		Race 3		Notes
Rank	Cyclist	Nation	Rank	Time	Rank	Time	Rank	Time	Notes
1	Leo Sterckx	Belgium	2	N/A	1	11.3	1	11.5	Q
2	Valentino Gasparella	Italy	1	11.1	2	N/A	2	N/A	B

==== Semifinal 2 ====
Rank	Cyclist	Nation	Race 1		Race 2		Race 3		Notes
Rank	Cyclist	Nation	Rank	Time	Rank	Time	Rank	Time	Notes
1	Sante Gaiardoni	Italy	1	11.6	1	12.8	—N/a		Q
2	Ron Baensch	Australia	2	N/A	2	N/A	—N/a		B

=== Finals ===
==== Bronze medal final ====
Rank	Cyclist	Nation	Race 1		Race 2		Race 3	
Rank	Cyclist	Nation	Rank	Time	Rank	Time	Rank	Time
3rd place, bronze medalist(s)	Valentino Gasparella	Italy	1	12.2	1	12.0	—N/a	
4	Ron Baensch	Australia	2	N/A	2	N/A	—N/a	

==== Gold medal final ====
Rank	Cyclist	Nation	Race 1		Race 2		Race 3	
Rank	Cyclist	Nation	Rank	Time	Rank	Time	Rank	Time
1st place, gold medalist(s)	Sante Gaiardoni	Italy	1	11.1	1	11.5	—N/a	
2nd place, silver medalist(s)	Leo Sterckx	Belgium	2	N/A	2	N/A	—N/a	

== Final classification ==
Rank	Cyclist	Nation
1st place, gold medalist(s)	Sante Gaiardoni	Italy
2nd place, silver medalist(s)	Leo Sterckx	Belgium
3rd place, bronze medalist(s)	Valentino Gasparella	Italy
4	Ron Baensch	Australia
5	Anésio Argenton	Brazil
5	Lloyd Binch	Great Britain
5	Antoine Pellegrina	France
5	August Rieke	United Team of Germany
9	Kurt Rechsteiner	Switzerland
9	Mario Vanegas	Colombia
11	André Gruchet	France
11	Günter Kaslowski	United Team of Germany
11	Clyde Rimple	British West Indies
11	Piet van der Touw	Netherlands
15	Imants Bodnieks	Soviet Union
15	Aad de Graaf	Netherlands
15	Gilbert De Rieck	Belgium
15	Boris Vasilyev	Soviet Union
19	Herbert Francis	United States
19	Luis Muciño	Mexico
19	Cenobio Ruiz	Mexico
22	Muhammad Ashiq	Pakistan
22	Abdul Razzaq Baloch	Pakistan
22	Karl Barton	Great Britain
22	José María Errandonea	Spain
22	Michael Horgan	Ireland
22	Martin McKay	Ireland
22	Paul Nyman	Finland
22	Jackie Simes	United States
22	Francisco Tortellá	Spain
