= Cycling at the 1960 Summer Olympics – Men's tandem =

Men's tandem cycling at the 1960 Olympics

Men's cycling tandem at the Games of the XVII Olympiad
- Venue: Olympic Velodrome, Rome
- Date: 26–27 August 1960
- Competitors: 24 from 12 nations

Medalists
1st place, gold medalist(s)		Giuseppe Beghetto, Sergio Bianchetto	Italy
2nd place, silver medalist(s)		Jürgen Simon, Lothar Stäber	United Team of Germany
3rd place, bronze medalist(s)		Boris Vasilyev, Vladimir Leonov	Soviet Union

The men's tandem cycling event at the 1960 Summer Olympics in Rome, Italy, took place from 26 to 27 August 1960 at the Olympic Velodrome. A total of 24 cyclists from 12 nations competed in the event.

== Competition format ==
- Heats: Fourteen teams were originally entered, and seven heats were scheduled. However, after two teams withdrew, some heats effectively became byes. The winner of each heat advanced directly to the quarterfinals, while the loser moved to the repechage.
- Repechage: A two-round repechage provided a second chance for teams that lost in the heats. One of the five teams that lost in the heats did not compete in the repechage. The remaining four teams were paired into two heats, with the winners advancing to the repechage final and the losers eliminated. The winner of the repechage final advanced to the quarterfinals, while the loser was eliminated.
- Quarterfinals: From this stage onward, each match was contested in a best-of-three format. The four quarterfinals included the seven heat winners and the one repechage winner. The winners advanced to the semifinals.
- Semifinals: The winners of the semifinals advanced to the gold medal final. The losers were originally scheduled to compete in a bronze medal final, but this was canceled due to an injury withdrawal.
- Finals: A gold medal final and a bronze medal final were planned, but only the gold medal final was held.

== Results ==
=== Heats ===
==== Heat 1 ====
Rank	Nation	Cyclists	Time	Notes
1	United Team of Germany	Jürgen Simon; Lothar Stäber	11.2	Q
2	Australia	Ian Browne; Geoff Smith	N/A	R

==== Heat 2 ====
Rank	Nation	Cyclists	Time	Notes
1	France	Roland Surrugue; Michel Scob	11.0	Q
–	Pakistan	Muhammad Ashiq; Abdul Razzaq Baloch	DNS	

==== Heat 3 ====
Rank	Nation	Cyclists	Time	Notes
1	Soviet Union	Boris Vasilyev; Vladimir Leonov	11.2	Q
2	Netherlands	Rinus Paul; Mees Gerritsen	N/A	R

==== Heat 4 ====
Rank	Nation	Cyclists	Time	Notes
1	Italy	Giuseppe Beghetto; Sergio Bianchetto	10.9	Q
–	Hungary	R. Bicskei; A. Meszaros	DNS	

==== Heat 5 ====
Rank	Nation	Cyclists	Time	Notes
1	Great Britain	David Handley; Eric Thompson	10.9	Q
2	Mexico	Luis Muciño; José Luis Tellez	N/A	R

==== Heat 6 ====
Rank	Nation	Cyclists	Time	Notes
1	Czechoslovakia	Juraj Miklušica; Dušan Škvarenina	11.0	Q
2	South Africa	Les Haupt Syd Byrnes	N/A	R WD

==== Heat 7 ====
Rank	Nation	Cyclists	Time	Notes
1	United States	Jack Hartman; David Sharp	11.3	Q
2	Switzerland	Peter Vogel; Peter Hirzel	N/A	R

=== Repechage heats ===
==== Repechage heat 1 ====
Rank	Nation	Cyclists	Time	Notes
1	Netherlands	Rinus Paul; Mees Gerritsen	11.5	Q
2	Switzerland	Peter Vogel; Peter Hirzel	N/A	

==== Repechage heat 2 ====
Rank	Nation	Cyclists	Time	Notes
1	Australia	Ian Browne; Geoff Smith	11.2	Q
2	Mexico	Luis Muciño; José Luis Tellez	N/A	

=== Repechage final ===
Rank	Nation	Cyclists	Time	Notes
1	Netherlands	Rinus Paul; Mees Gerritsen	11.0	Q
2	Australia	Ian Browne; Geoff Smith	N/A	

=== Quarterfinals ===
==== Quarterfinal 1 ====
Rank	Nation	Cyclists	Race 1		Race 2		Race 3		Notes
Rank	Nation	Cyclists	Rank	Time	Rank	Time	Rank	Time	Notes
1	Italy	Giuseppe Beghetto; Sergio Bianchetto	1	10.2	1	10.5	—N/a		Q
2	United States	Jack Hartman; David Sharp	2	N/A	2	N/A	—N/a		

==== Quarterfinal 2 ====
Rank	Nation	Cyclists	Race 1		Race 2		Race 3		Notes
Rank	Nation	Cyclists	Rank	Time	Rank	Time	Rank	Time	Notes
1	Soviet Union	Boris Vasilyev; Vladimir Leonov	1	11.4	1	10.5	—N/a		Q
2	Great Britain	David Handley; Eric Thompson	2	N/A	2	N/A	—N/a		

==== Quarterfinal 3 ====
Rank	Nation	Cyclists	Race 1		Race 2		Race 3		Notes
Rank	Nation	Cyclists	Rank	Time	Rank	Time	Rank	Time	Notes
1	Netherlands	Rinus Paul; Mees Gerritsen	2	N/A	1	10.6	1	10.9	Q
2	France	Roland Surrugue; Michel Scob	1	10.9	2	N/A	2	N/A	

==== Quarterfinal 4 ====
Rank	Nation	Cyclists	Race 1		Race 2		Race 3		Notes
Rank	Nation	Cyclists	Rank	Time	Rank	Time	Rank	Time	Notes
1	United Team of Germany	Jürgen Simon; Lothar Stäber	1	11.0	1	10.8	—N/a		Q
2	Czechoslovakia	Juraj Miklušica; Dušan Škvarenina	2	N/A	2	N/A	—N/a		

=== Semifinals ===
==== Semifinal 1 ====
The Dutch team crashed during the second race and was unable to continue the contest.

Rank	Nation	Cyclists	Race 1		Race 2		Race 3		Notes
Rank	Nation	Cyclists	Rank	Time	Rank	Time	Rank	Time	Notes
1	Italy	Giuseppe Beghetto; Sergio Bianchetto	1	10.5	1	10.8	—N/a		Q
2	Netherlands	Rinus Paul; Mees Gerritsen	2	N/A	2	DNF	—N/a		B

==== Semifinal 2 ====
Rank	Nation	Cyclists	Race 1		Race 2		Race 3		Notes
Rank	Nation	Cyclists	Rank	Time	Rank	Time	Rank	Time	Notes
1	United Team of Germany	Jürgen Simon; Lothar Stäber	1	11.0	1	11.0	—N/a		Q
2	Soviet Union	Boris Vasilyev; Vladimir Leonov	2	N/A	2	N/A	—N/a		B

=== Finals ===
==== Bronze medal final ====
The Dutch team did not start the bronze medal final after crashing during the semifinals.

Rank	Nation	Cyclists	Race 1		Race 2		Race 3	
Rank	Nation	Cyclists	Rank	Time	Rank	Time	Rank	Time
3rd place, bronze medalist(s)	Soviet Union	Boris Vasilyev; Vladimir Leonov	Walkover					
4	Netherlands	Rinus Paul; Mees Gerritsen	Walkover					

==== Gold medal final ====
Rank	Nation	Cyclists	Race 1		Race 2		Race 3	
Rank	Nation	Cyclists	Rank	Time	Rank	Time	Rank	Time
1st place, gold medalist(s)	Italy	Giuseppe Beghetto; Sergio Bianchetto	1	10.7	1	10.3	—N/a	
2nd place, silver medalist(s)	United Team of Germany	Jürgen Simon; Lothar Stäber	2	N/A	2	N/A	—N/a	

== Final classification ==
Rank	Cyclists	Nation
1st place, gold medalist(s)	Giuseppe Beghetto; Sergio Bianchetto	Italy
2nd place, silver medalist(s)	Jürgen Simon; Lothar Stäber	United Team of Germany
3rd place, bronze medalist(s)	Boris Vasilyev; Vladimir Leonov	Soviet Union
4	Rinus Paul; Mees Gerritsen	Netherlands
5	Roland Surrugue; Michel Scob	France
5	David Handley; Eric Thompson	Great Britain
5	Juraj Miklušica; Dušan Škvarenina	Czechoslovakia
5	Jack Hartman; David Sharp	United States
9	Ian Browne; Geoff Smith	Australia
10	Peter Vogel; Peter Hirzel	Switzerland
10	Luis Muciño; José Luis Tellez	Mexico
12	Les Haupt; Syd Byrnes	South Africa
