= Ian Browne (cyclist) =

Australian track cyclist (1931–2023)

Ian Browne OAM
Personal information
- Nickname: Joey
- Born: 22 June 1931 Melbourne, Victoria, Australia
- Died: 24 June 2023 (aged 92) Balwyn North, Victoria, Australia
- Height: 1.86 m (6 ft 1 in)
- Weight: 85 kg (187 lb)

Cycling career
- Sport: Cycling
- Discipline: Track
- Role: Rider
- Rider type: Sprinter
Medal record
Representing Australia
Men's track cycling
Olympic Games
Gold medal – first place	1956 Melbourne	2000 m tandem
Commonwealth Games
Gold medal – first place	1958 Cardiff	10 mile
Bronze medal – third place	1962 Perth	1000 m Sprint

Ian Sterry Browne OAM (22 June 1931 – 24 June 2023) also known as Joey Browne was an Australian track cyclist who along with Tony Marchant won the 2000 m tandem event at the 1956 Summer Olympics in Melbourne.

Unusually tall and strongly built for a cyclist, Browne had little formal training and won his first Australian title in 1953 in the 10 mile event. Browne did not team up with Marchant until early in 1956 and they promptly won the tandem event at the national championships to earn national selection. The pair were eliminated after losing their first two races but were given a reprieve when the Soviet Union pair were hospitalised in a crash and forced to withdraw. Thereafter Marchant and Browne were unbeaten and progressed to an unlikely Olympic gold. Browne's combination with Marchant was broken after the Olympics when the latter retired. In 1958, Browne won the 10 mile event at the national titles and went on to win the event at the 1958 British Empire and Commonwealth Games. Browne went on to compete in the 1960 and 1964 Olympics in the tandem event, both times with new partners, but both times he was eliminated in the repechage round. In 1964, he became the oldest ever track cyclist to represent Australia at the Olympics at the age of 33. He won the last of his national titles at the age of 37 in 1968 in the tandem event but was overlooked for Olympic selection by Australian officials. He retired and later was involved in cycling administration.

== Early years ==
Browne was born in Melbourne to Linda and Alex Browne, the second of three brothers. His father was a printer and Browne took his elementary education at Chatham Public School, before moving on to Box Hill High School and later took his university education at Royal Melbourne Institute of Technology (RMIT). While he was at university, he also worked in Sunshine as a laboratory assistant at Spaldings. At the age of 20, he graduated from RMIT and took a job at the State Electricity Commission, where he worked for over 35 years continuously since then, always riding his bicycle to work, a daily journey of around 15 km.

Browne learned to ride a bicycle at the age of four, but did not enter his first formal cycling competition until the age of 16, when he joined the Hawthorne Amateur Cycling Club. Browne made a habit of riding to training with his ordinary bike with heavy wheels to the club, carrying the lighter racing tyres on his back and changing his tyres upon his arrival. He earned extra money to fund a bicycle upgrade by working as a newspaper boy. There was little formal coaching at the club, and the cyclists learned by individual application and by watching and copying others. Browne and his club-mates raced on Saturdays and trained on Sundays.

Browne had his first success at a major competition when he won the 10 mile at his first Australian Championships in 1953. He did not team up with Tony Marchant until the start of 1956, just ten months before the start of the Melbourne Olympics. Marchant had risen to prominence by winning the 500 m time trial at the 1955 Australian Championships for juniors, prompting Browne to select him as his partner based on his raw speed. For a final test run before formally committing to racing together, the pair simply had a few tandem sprints around the track, with Browne sitting in the front seat. They were a contrasting pair; Marchant was a short man of 170 cm (5.6 ft) and 65 kg (143 lb), while Browne stood at 186 cm (6.10 ft) and 86 kg (190 lb), unusually tall for a cyclist. The pair went on to win the 2000 metre (m) tandem event at the Australian Championships in 1956, but going into the Melbourne Olympics, nobody, themselves included, regarded them as realistic medal chances. However, their mentor, former champion Billy Guyatt convinced them that they had the potential to make progress at international level.

Their training schedule consisted of individual training two or three times a week and two days a week of coordinated tandem training during the Olympic year. Marchant's main tactical responsibility was to look to the outside for impending attacks while Browne patrolled the inside. Marchant devised a signal system, such as a head bump on Browne's hip, or even a verbal shout when the opposition made a move.

== Olympic gold ==
Ten nations were entered in the tandem competition, and in the first round, they were drawn with Germany and South Africa, who fielded their silver medallist pairing of Tom Shardelow and Ray Robinson from the 1952 Summer Olympics in Helsinki. The Australians made their move too early and led at the ringing of the bell at the start of the last lap, but they were overhauled well before the line as they faded in the final straight. Browne and Marchant were given another chance in the repechage round later in the same day. The Australians led for three quarters of the distance, but were overhauled by their Czechoslovak opponent in the final metres and were defeated in a photo finish. This would normally have meant that the Australians would have been eliminated, however the final repechage between the Soviet Union and the Germans resulted in a tangle, resulting in a heavy pile-up. Neither team finished the race, but the Soviets were hospitalised. The cycling officials decided that the bruised Germans would be forced to compete in a repechage sequel against the losers in the previous repechages to qualify. This allowed the United States and the Australians a reprieve.

The Australians seized their good fortune and set their fastest time to date with 11.0 seconds (s). Having been beaten twice after leading out, the Australians sat back before sweeping past the injured Germans and the Americans in the final lap. Australia were again drawn against South Africa in their quarter-final, who had defeated them easily in the heats. This time they equalled the fastest team in the competition over the final 200 m, clocking 10.8 s to progress to the final, where they faced Italy. Giuseppe Ogna and Cesare Pinarello appeared to be in control at the start of the final lap. They had moved alongside the Australians with one and a half laps to go, but the Australians surprised them at the start of the final lap. The Italians came back to pull level at the start of the back straight, but the Australians held them off and pulled away to win by a length and a half. The Italians lodged a protest for interference but it was dismissed. The Australians finished in a time of 10.8 s and Browne later claimed that he was convinced by the performance that they would win the gold medal.

The final took place on the third day of racing. The Australians came to the conclusion that their wheels and tyres were too heavy, so they sought to buy better cycling equipment from the defeated Germans. The Germans agreed, saying "Have ours and you will win the gold medal." Australia were again pitted against the Czechoslovak Václav Machek and Ladislav Fouček. One of the reasons behind Australia's return to form had been the return of Guyatt to a mentoring role. Guyatt had assisted them at the national championships, but they were assigned to another coach at the Olympics. Guyatt was regarded as a marketing-style motivator and he attempted to give Browne and Marchant a psychological boost. Equipped with their new machines, Browne and Marchant employed a tactical trick devised by Guyatt. The Australian staff had noticed that the Czechoslovaks had always made their final burst from a certain point from the finish. During the final, Australian team manager Bill Young stood at the said point as the Australian led out. When Browne came to the point, he pulled upwards and pre-emptively blocked the expected Czechoslovak attack. This helped to stifle the attack and Australia went on to win the gold medal.

== Later career ==
Following the Olympics, Marchant retired, and Browne went on to win the individual 10 mile race at the 1958 Australian Championships. Browne went to the 1958 British Empire and Commonwealth Games at Cardiff in Wales. He was unplaced in the sprint, but won the 10 mile race to collect a gold medal. Browne had intended to retire after returning from Cardiff, but the lure of a second Olympics proved too much. In 1960, he won the 2000 m tandem with Geoff Smith at the Australian Championships and was selected for the 1960 Summer Olympics in Rome. There was to be no repeat of the triumph in Melbourne, as the pair were eliminated in the second repechage. Since no other Australian older than 28 had ever represented the nation in cycling, Browne was the oldest ever male cyclist to represent Australia at the Olympics. Browne continued to the 1962 British Empire and Commonwealth Games in Perth, Western Australia, but was unable to win a gold in front of his home crowd, finishing with a bronze in the sprint. In 1964, Browne again won the tandem event at the Australian Championships, combining with his new partner Daryl Perkins. The pair then went to the 1964 Summer Olympics in Tokyo, where Browne beat his own mark of being the oldest cyclist to represent Australia at the Olympics, at the age of 33. This time, the Australians were eliminated in the quarter-final. Browne continued to compete at national level, successfully defending the tandem title in 1965, this time with a new partner Gordon Johnson. He won his fifth and final tandem and his last Australian Championship in 1968 with Johnson, but the Australian selectors overlooked Browne, instead selecting Hilton Clarke to partner Johnson in the tandem at the 1968 Summer Olympics in Mexico City, ending Browne's career.

Browne was regarded as an intelligent and meticulous athlete, who was known for a logical and somewhat introspective style in his approach to the sport. He felt that he did not have the raw speed to match the likes of Lionel Cox and Dick Ploog in vying for selection in Australia's sprint team, and that he was not suited to long road races, instead focusing on medium length track racing. Browne typically was the front rider in tandem races, liking to be in control. He was regarded to be a cyclist who behaved in a careful and scholarly manner, and was known for coaxing higher levels of performance out of his younger partners. Browne was respected for his technical knowledge of the tandem and his success was often attributed to his vast experience.

== After cycling ==
In his retirement, Browne continued his involvement in the sport, using his vast experience to serve the sport as an administrator. Browne served as the Vice President of the Victorian Amateur Cycling Association and he strongly advocated the use of a handicap system in racing, believing that it would improve the standard of racing and improve Australia's success rate. In 1994 Browne was awarded the Medal of the Order of Australia (OAM) for service to cycling.

At the age of 39, he married Rhonda, a primary school teacher. They had three children, a girl and two boys.

Browne died on 24 June 2023, at the age of 92.
