= Cycling at the 1954 British Empire and Commonwealth Games =

- Venue: Empire Oval, China Creek Park, Vancouver
- Dates: 30 July – 7 August 1954

Cycling at the 1954 British Empire and Commonwealth Games was the fourth appearance of Cycling at the Commonwealth Games. The events were held in Vancouver, Canada from 30 July to 7 August 1954.

The track events took place at Empire Oval or Broadway Bowl in China Creek Park, which had been specially constructed wooden track for the Games.

The road race course was described as quite flat, featuring a high point of 360 feet and the highest gradient was 250 feet in 440 yards.

England topped the cycling medal table with three gold medals.

In the sprint final, Lionel Cox of Australia did not receive a medal after refusing to continue the match against Cyril Peacock of England. Cox had been disqualified in race 1 for cutting across Peacock's wheel and subsequently the Australian team refused to participate in the next race and were subsequently disqualified.

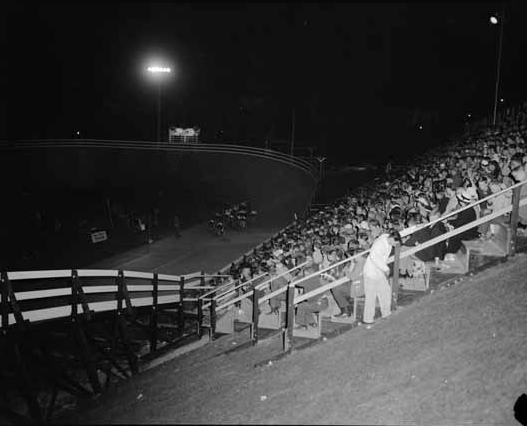
Broadway Bowl track cycling during the games. Attribution:Province newspaper

== Medal table ==
* Host nation (Canada)

Medals won by nation with totals, ranked by number of golds—sortable
Rank	Nation	Gold	Silver	Bronze	Total
1	England (ENG)	3	2	2	7
2	Australia (AUS)	2	0	0	2
3	South Africa	1	0	2	3
4	New Zealand (NZL)	0	1	0	1
5	Wales	0	0	1	1
6	British Guiana (BGU)	0	0	0	0
6	Canada*	0	0	0	0
6	Pakistan (PAK)	0	0	0	0
6	Scotland (SCO)	0	0	0	0
6	Southern Rhodesia (SRH)	0	0	0	0
Totals (10 entries)		6	3	5	14

== Medal winners ==
Event	Gold	Silver	Bronze
Time trial	Dick Ploog (AUS)		Keith Harrison (ENG)
Time trial	Alfred Swift (SAF)		Keith Harrison (ENG)
Sprint	Cyril Peacock (ENG)	+not awarded	Tom Shardelow (SAF)
Individual pursuit	Norman Sheil (ENG)	Peter Brotherton (ENG)	Robert Fowler (SAF)
10 Miles scratch	Lindsay Cocks (AUS)	Keith Harrison (ENG)	Don Skene (WAL)
Road race	Eric Thompson (ENG)	John Baird (NZL)	Bernard Pusey (ENG)

== Results ==
=== 1 km time trial ===
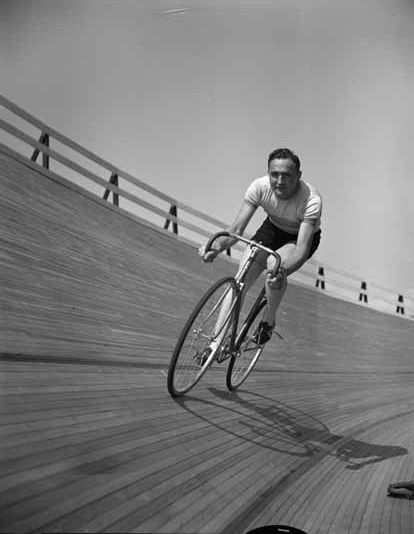
Pat Murphy of Canada. Attribution:Province newspaper

Rank	Rider	Time
1st place, gold medalist(s)	(Australia) Dick Ploog	1:12.5
1st place, gold medalist(s)	(South Africa) Alfred Swift	1:12.5
3rd place, bronze medalist(s)	(England) Keith Harrison	1:12.7
4	(England) Peter Brotherton	1:12.8
5	(England) Cyril Peacock	1:13.0
6	(New Zealand) Colin Dickinson	1:13.2
7	(South Africa) Ron Robertson	1:13.7
8	(Australia) Lindsay Cocks	1:13.8
9	(Canada) Jim Davies	1:14.1
10	(Canada) Patrick Murphy	1:14.5
11	(Australia) Lionel Cox	1:14.6
12	(New Zealand) Neil Ritchie	1:15.3
13	(Southern Rhodesia) John van Wyk	1:15.7
14	(Canada) André Robert	1:15.8
15	(Southern Rhodesia) Ernest Branfield	1:15.9
16	(New Zealand) Les Lock	1:16.1
17	(Wales) Don Skene	1:16.2
18	(Wales) Malcolm Campbell	1:20.0
19	(Pakistan) Muhammad Naqi Mallick	1:22.0
20	(Pakistan) Ghulam H. Baloch	1:23.9
21	(Wales) Philip Waring	1:23.9
22	(Pakistan) Mahmood Saleem Farooqi	1:26.9

=== 1,000m sprint championship ===
Quarter-final

Athlete	Athlete	Score
(South Africa) Tom Shardelow	(Canada) Jim Davies	2–0
(Australia) Lionel Cox	(New Zealand) Colin Dickinson	2–0
(England) Cyril Peacock	(South Africa) Alfred Swift	2–1
(Australia) Dick Ploog	(England) Keith Harrison	2–1

Semi finals

- Peacock bt Plog 2–0
- Cox bt Shardelow 2–

Third place

- Shardelow bt Ploog 2–1

Final

- Peacock bt Cox w/o

=== 4,000 metres individual purusit ===
Qualifiers for quarter-finals

Athlete	Time
(England) Norman Sheil	5.10.4
(South Africa) Robert Fowler	5.10.8
(South Africa) Ron Mitton	5.12.2
(England) Peter Brotherton	5.13.2
(England) Bernard Pusey	5.16.7
(New Zealand) Neil Ritchie	5.21.4
(Canada) Patrick Murphy	5.21.5
(Australia) John William Law	5.22.8

Quarter-finals

- Sheil bt Law - caught at 4.44.4
- Brotherton bt Ritchie - 5.12.3
- Fowler bt Murphy - 5.13.4
- Pusey bt Mitton - 5.09.5

Semi-finals

- Sheil bt Fowler - 5.06.4
- Brotherton bt Pusey 5.14.6

Third place

- Fowler 5.06.9 bt Pusey 5.08.5

Final

- Sheil 5.03.5 (world record) bt Brotherton 5.09.1

=== 10 mile scratch race ===
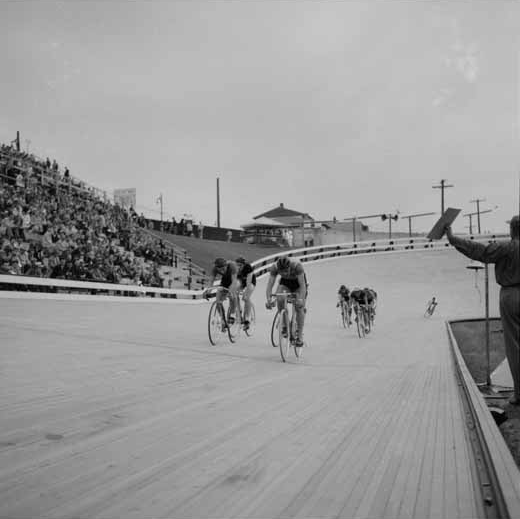
Scratch race in progress. Attribution:Province newspaper

Pos	Athlete	Time
1	(Australia) Lindsay Cocks	2.44.08
2	(England) Keith Harrison	
3	(Wales) Don Skene	
4	(Canada) Lorne Atkinson	
5	(New Zealand) Les Lock	
6	(England) Eric Thompson	
-	(Australia) Dick Ploog	
-	(Canada) B. Henderson	
-	(Canada) Fred Markus	
-	(England) Norman Sheil	
-	(New Zealand) Colin Dickinson	
-	(New Zealand) Neil Ritchie	
-	(Pakistan) Mahmood Saleem Farooqi	
-	(Pakistan) Muhammad Naqi Mallick	
-	(Pakistan) Ghulam H. Baloch	
-	(Scotland) Ronnie Park	
-	(South Africa) John Alfred Swift	
-	(South Africa) Tom Shardelow	
-	(South Africa) Ron Robertson	
-	(Wales) Malcolm Campbell	
-	(Wales) Philip Waring	
-	(Southern Rhodesia) Ernest P. Branfield	
-	(Southern Rhodesia) John van Wyk	

=== Road Race ===
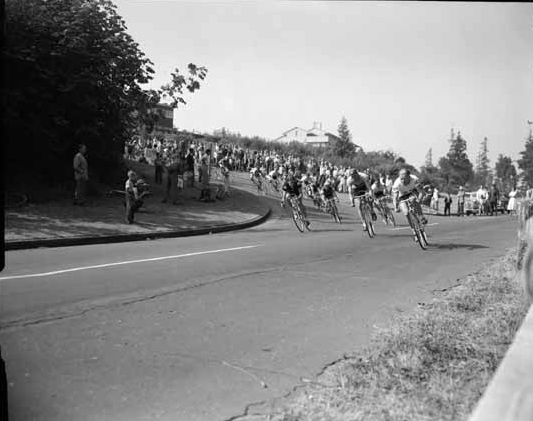
1954 British Empire and Commonwealth Games road race Attribution:Province newspaper

Pos	Athlete	Time
1	(England) Eric Thompson	2.44.08
2	(New Zealand) John Baird	
3	(England) Bernard Pusey	
4	(Australia) Edward James Nestor	
5	(Australia) George Frederick Nevin	
6	(Scotland) Ronnie Park	
7	(South Africa) Alfred Swift	
-	(Australia) John O'Sullivan	
-	(Australia) John William Law	
-	(Canada) André Robert	
-	(Canada) Patrick Murphy	
-	(Canada) Guy Morin	
-	(Canada) A. Cole	
-	(England) Norman Sheil	
-	(England) Tony Hoar	
-	(British Guiana) M. Crum-Ewing	
-	(New Zealand) Les Lock	
-	(New Zealand) Neil Ritchie	
-	(New Zealand) Lance Payne	
-	(Pakistan) Mahmood Saleem Farooqi	
-	(Pakistan) Muhammad Naqi Mallick	
-	(Pakistan) Ghulam H. Baloch	
-	(South Africa) Ron Robertson	
-	(South Africa) Robert Fowler	
-	(Wales) Malcolm Campbell	
-	(Wales) Don Skene	
-	(Wales) Philip Waring	
-	(Southern Rhodesia) Ernest P. Branfield	

== See also ==
- List of Commonwealth Games medallists in cycling
