= Tony Marchant (cyclist) =

Australian cyclist

Personal information
- Full name: Tony Marchant
- Nickname: Tippy
- Born: 28 August 1937 (age 89) Chelsea, Victoria, Australia
- Height: 1.70 m (5 ft 7 in)
- Weight: 65 kg (143 lb)

Cycling career
- Sport: Cycling
- Discipline: Track
- Role: Rider
- Rider type: Sprinter
Medal record
Representing Australia
Men's track cycling
Olympic Games
Gold medal – first place	1956 Melbourne	2000 m tandem

Anthony John Marchant OAM, also known as "Tippy" Marchant (born 28 August 1937) is a former Australian track cyclist who along with Ian Browne won the 2000 m tandem event at the 1956 Summer Olympics in Melbourne. Marchant had little formal training and only took up the sport at the age of 16 because his friends liked the sport. In 1955, Marchant shot to prominence after only two years in the sport, winning the 500 m time trial and the 5 mile event at the Junior Australian Championships. This resulted him being approached by Browne to team up in early 1956 and they promptly won the tandem event at the national championships to earn national selection. The pair were eliminated after losing their first two races but were given a reprieve when the Soviet Union pair were hospitalised in a crash and forced to withdraw. Thereafter Marchant and Browne were unbeaten and progressed to an unlikely Olympic gold. In 1957, Marchant retired to play Australian rules football, again basing his decision on his friends' interests. In 1958 he made a brief comeback as a professional, but with only sporadic success, he retired in 1961.

== Early years ==
Marchant was born in Chelsea, Victoria, where he grew up. His father was a member of the Royal Australian Navy, who later became a bank manager. His father died when Marchant was young. This left his mother, a nurse, to raise Marchant and his four sisters and three brothers. Unlike his siblings, Marchant was interested in sport from a young age. He particularly took a liking to boxing, and won the school boxing championship at St Bede's College. In his teenage years, he fought about 25 bouts with the Chelsea Youth Club.

Influenced by three of his friends, Marchant took up cycling in 1953 at the age of 16. He earned some money from selling flowers and delivering newspapers and bought a semi-racing bike. Later, he was a given a proper racing bike from his first trainer Merv Norton.

Marchant began at the Chelsea Amateur Cycling Club, which did not even have a banked cycling track and was trained by Norton and Maurie Cramer. Marchant rose to prominence by winning the 500 metres (m) time trial at the 1955 Victorian Championships for juniors in only his second year of competition. He then won the 5 mile title and the 500 m time trial at the Australian Junior Championships. He added a silver medal in the sprint.

Marchant first teamed up with Ian Browne at the start of 1956, just ten months before the start of the Melbourne Olympics. The older Browne selected Marchant because of the pure speed that Marchant had exhibited in the past year. They were a contrasting pair. Marchant was a short man of 170 cm (5.6 ft) and 65 kg (143 lb), while Browne stood at 186 cm (6.10 ft) and 86 kg (190 lb), unusually tall for a cyclist. For a final test run before the pair formally committed to racing together, the pair simply had a few tandem sprints around the track. Browne sat in the front seat, while Marchant sat in the rear seat. The pair went on to win the 2000 m tandem event at the Australian Championships in 1956, but going into the Melbourne Olympics, nobody, themselves included, regarded them as realistic medal chances. However, their mentor, former champion Billy Guyatt convinced them that they had the potential to make progress at international level.

Their training schedule consisted of individual training two or three times a week and two days a week of coordinated tandem training during the Olympic year. Marchant's main tactical responsibility was to look to the outside for impending attacks while Browne patrolled the inside. Marchant devised a signal system, such as a head bump on Browne's hip, or even a verbal shout when the opposition made a move.

== Olympics ==
Ten nations were entered in the tandem competition, and in the first round, they were drawn with Germany and South Africa, who fielded their silver medallist pairing of Tom Shardelow and Ray Robinson from the 1952 Summer Olympics in Helsinki. The Australians made their move too early and led at the ringing of the bell at the start of the last lap, but they were overhauled well before the line as they faded in the final straight. Browne and Marchant were given another chance in the repechage round later in the same day. The Australians lead for three quarters of the distance, but were overhauled by their Czechoslovak opponent in the final metres and were defeated in a photo finish. This would normally have meant that the Australians would have been eliminated, however the final repechage between the Soviet Union and the Germans resulted in a tangle, resulting in a heavy pile-up. Neither team finished the race, but the Soviets were hospitalised. The cycling officials decided that the bruised Germans would be forced to compete in a repechage sequel against the losers in the previous repechages to qualify. This allowed the United States and the Australians a reprieve.

The Australians seized their good fortune and set their fastest time to date with 11.0 seconds (s). Having been beaten twice after leading out, the Australians sat back before sweeping past the Germans and Americans in the final lap. Australia were again drawn against South Africa in their quarter-final, who had defeated them easily in the heats. This time they equalled the fastest team in the competition over the final 200 m, clocking 10.8 s to progress to the final, where they faced the Italy. Giuseppe Ogna and Cesare Pinarello appeared to be in control at the start of the final lap. They had moved alongside the Australians with one and a half laps to go, but the Australians surprised them at the start of the final lap. The Italians came back to pull level at the start of the back straight, but the Australians held them off and pulled away to win by a length and a half. The Italians lodged a protest for interference but it was dismissed. The Australians finished in a time of 10.8 s and Browne later claimed that he was convinced by the performance that they would win the gold medal.

The final took place on the third day of racing. The Australians came to the conclusion that their wheels and tyres were too heavy, so they sought to buy better cycling equipment from the defeated Germans. The Germans agreed, saying "Have ours and you will win the gold medal." Australia were again pitted against the Czechoslovak Václav Machek and Ladislav Fouček. One of the reasons behind Australia's return to form had been the return of Guyatt to a mentoring role. Guyatt had assisted them at the national championships, but they were assigned to another coach at the Olympics. Guyatt was regarded as a marketing-style motivator and he attempted to give Browne and Marchant a psychological boost. Equipped with their new machines, Browne and Marchant employed a tactical trick devised by Guyatt. The Australian staff had noticed that the Czechoslovaks had always made their final burst from a certain point from the finish. During the final, Australian team manager Bill Young stood at the said point as the Australian led out. When Browne came to the point, he pulled upwards and pre-emptively blocked the expected Czechoslovak attack. As the Australians veered out to cut off the opposition attack, the two pairs made hip contact. This helped to stifle the attack and Australia went on to win the gold medal. Upon returning to his home town, he was mobbed by thousands of schoolchildren who had come to welcome him, and he was given a civic reception.

== Later years ==
The following year in 1957, Marchant unexpectedly left the sport, much to the dismay of the cycling community, which believed that he would continue to more success. He switched to playing Australian rules football because that was what his friends did. He felt that fitting in with his friends was more important, saying "I was a funny bloke. I did a lot on brilliance rather than hard work. I preferred to do what my mates were doing."

After a year away from the bike, Marchant returned to cycling and turned professional in 1958. Within a year he left for Europe with Ron Murray and Alan McLellan on the professional racing circuit. The trip was unsuccessful. The group did not take their track bikes with them, with Marchant ordering one from Italy. The equipment never arrived and he competed in Belgium and Copenhagen on borrowed bikes. Marchant only displayed glimpses of his ability, defeating the Italian champion in one outing and also winning the La Trobe race in Tasmania. Marchant then retired in 1961.

During his cycling career, Marchant had worked as an apprentice shoe cutter. After his retirement, he continued along the same line of work, spending his entire working career in the shoe industry, designing and marketing women's fashion shoes under the brand Imps and Cadets. He married in 1962 and has two children.
