= Cycling at the 1960 Summer Olympics – Men's track time trial =

Cycling at the Olympics

Men's cycling track time trial at the Games of the XVII Olympiad
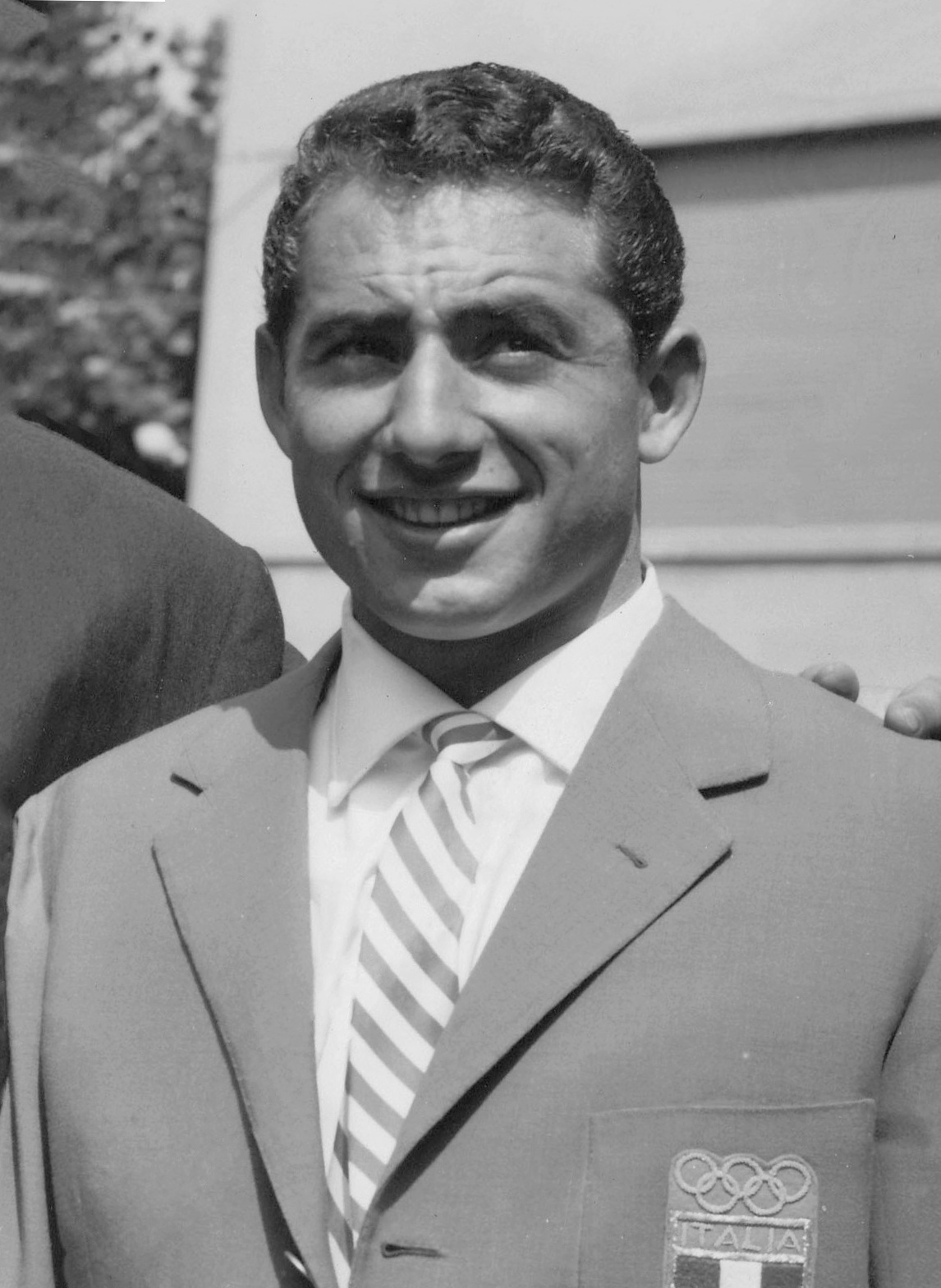
- Sante Gaiardoni
- Venue: Olympic Velodrome, Rome
- Date: 26 August 1960
- Competitors: 25 from 25 nations
- Winning time: 1:07.27 WR

Medalists
1st place, gold medalist(s)		Sante Gaiardoni; Italy
2nd place, silver medalist(s)		Dieter Gieseler; United Team of Germany
3rd place, bronze medalist(s)		Rostislav Vargashkin; Soviet Union

The men's track time trial at the 1960 Summer Olympics in Rome, Italy, was held on 26 August 1960. There were 25 participants from 25 nations, with each nation limited to one competitor. The event was won by Sante Gaiardoni of Italy, the nation's second consecutive victory (tying Australia and France for most all-time) and third consecutive podium appearance in the men's track time trial. Dieter Gieseler won the United Team of Germany's first medal in the event in its first appearance with his silver; it was the first medal for a German athlete since 1936. Rostislav Vargashkin's bronze was the first medal for the Soviet Union in the event.

== Background ==
This was the eighth appearance of the event, which had previously been held in 1896 and every Games since 1928. It would be held every Games until being dropped from the programme after 2004. Returning cyclists from 1956 were fifth-place finisher Luis Serra of Uruguay, eighth-place finisher Warwick Dalton of New Zealand, ninth-place finisher Anésio Argenton of Brazil, tenth-place finisher Allen Bell of the United States, twelfth-place finisher Tetsuo Osawa of Japan, and eighteenth-place finisher Paul Nyman of Finland. Sante Gaiardoni was the sprint world champion (having placed second two times in a row before finally winning in 1960) and had set the amateur world record in the time trial a month and a half before the Games.

The British West Indies made its debut in the men's track time trial. East and West Germany competed as the United Team of Germany for the first time. France and Great Britain each made their eighth appearance, having competed at every appearance of the event.

== Competition format ==
The event was a time trial on the track, with each cyclist competing separately to attempt to achieve the fastest time. Each cyclist raced one kilometre from a standing start. This was the first time that results were measured to the hundredth of a second instead of the tenth of a second.

== Records ==
The following were the world and Olympic records prior to the competition.

World record	Sante Gaiardoni (ITA)	1:07.50	Rome, Italy	3 July 1960
Olympic record	Leandro Faggin (ITA)	1:09.8	Melbourne, Australia	6 December 1956

Piet van der Touw was the first to break the Olympic record, recording a time of 1:09.20. Dieter Gieseler bettered that, to 1:08.75. But Sante Gaiardoni, the world record holder, broke his own world record with a time of 1:07.27. Rostislav Vargashkin and Ian Chapman also finished faster than the old Olympic record.

== Schedule ==
All times are Central European Time (UTC+1)

Date	Time	Round
Friday, 26 August 1960	"night"	Final

== Results ==
Rank	Cyclist	Nation	Time	Notes
1st place, gold medalist(s)	Sante Gaiardoni	Italy	1:07.27	WR
2nd place, silver medalist(s)	Dieter Gieseler	United Team of Germany	1:08.75	
3rd place, bronze medalist(s)	Rostislav Vargashkin	Soviet Union	1:08.86	
4	Piet van der Touw	Netherlands	1:09.20	
5	Ian Chapman	Australia	1:09.55	
6	Anésio Argenton	Brazil	1:09.96	
7	Jean Govaerts	Belgium	1:10.23	
8	Josef Helbling	Switzerland	1:10.42	
9	Les Haupt	South Africa	1:10.61	
10	János Söre	Hungary	1:10.63	
11	Warwick Dalton	New Zealand	1:10.68	
12	Ion Ioniţă	Romania	1:10.91	
13	Allen Bell	United States	1:11.33	
14	Luis Serra	Uruguay	1:11.42	
15	Mauricio Mata	Mexico	1:11.61	
16	Michel Scob	France	1:11.65	
17	Karl Barton	Great Britain	1:11.72	
18	Boncho Novakov	Bulgaria	1:11.73	
19	Tetsuo Osawa	Japan	1:11.86	
20	Günther Kriz	Austria	1:12.58	
21	Paul Nyman	Finland	1:14.11	
22	Diego Calero	Colombia	1:14.18	
23	Clyde Rimple	British West Indies	1:16.08	
24	Michael Horgan	Ireland	1:17.18	
25	Muhammad Ashiq	Pakistan	1:20.17	
