= Cycling at the 1956 Summer Olympics – Men's tandem =

Cycling - Men's tandem at the Games of the XVI Olympiad
- Venue: Melbourne
- Dates: 3–6 December 1956
- Competitors: 20 from 10 nations

Medalists
1st place, gold medalist(s)		Anthony Marchant, Ian Browne; Australia
2nd place, silver medalist(s)		Ladislav Fouček, Václav Machek; Czechoslovakia
3rd place, bronze medalist(s)		Cesare Pinarello, Giuseppe Ogna; Italy

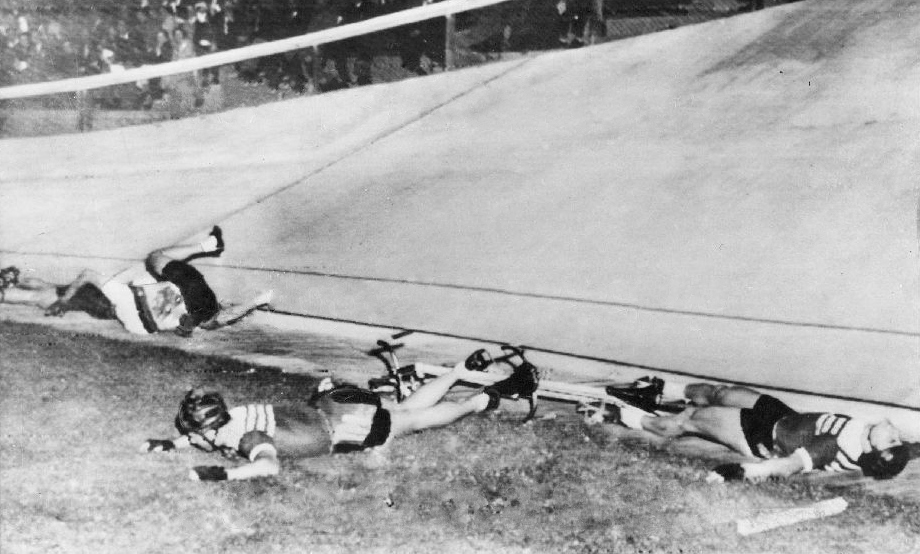
German and Soviet teams collided in the repechage round, which resulted in the last place for both teams, with three cyclists being hospitalized.

The men's tandem was an event at the 1956 Summer Olympics in Melbourne, Australia, held from 3 to 6 December 1956. There were 20 participants from 10 nations. The winner of each heat qualified for the quarterfinals, the losers for the repechages.

== Final classification ==
Rank	Name	Nationality
1st place, gold medalist(s)	Anthony Marchant; Ian Browne	Australia
2nd place, silver medalist(s)	Ladislav Fouček; Václav Machek	Czechoslovakia
3rd place, bronze medalist(s)	Cesare Pinarello; Giuseppe Ogna	Italy
4	Eric Thompson; Peter Brotherton	Great Britain
5	André Gruchet; Robert Vidal	France
5	Ritchie Johnston; Warren Johnston	New Zealand
5	Raymond Robinson; Thomas Shardelow	South Africa
5	Donald Ferguson; James Rossi	United States
9	Rostislav Vargashkin; Vladimir Leonov	Soviet Union
9	Fritz Neuser; Günther Ziegler	United Team of Germany
