= 1954 UCI Track Cycling World Championships =

Cycling competition

- Venue: Cologne and Wuppertal, West Germany
- Date: 27–29 August 1954
- Velodrome: Müngersdorfer Stadion; Stadion am Zoo
- Events: 5

The 1954 UCI Track Cycling World Championships took place in Cologne, West Germany, at the Müngersdorfer Radrennbahn velodrome from August 28 to September 5, 1954. This was one of the annual world championship events organized by the Union Cycliste Internationale (UCI), featuring track cycling disciplines.

== Medal summary ==
Event	Gold	Silver	Bronze
Men's Professional Events
Men's sprint	Reg Harris; Great Britain	Arie van Vliet; Netherlands	Enzo Sacchi; Italy
Men's individual pursuit	Guido Messina; Italy	Hugo Koblet; Switzerland	Lucien Gillen; Luxembourg
Men's motor-paced	Adolph Verschueren; Belgium	Jan Pronk; Netherlands	Joe Bunker; Great Britain
Men's Amateur Events
Men's sprint	Cyril Peacock; Great Britain	John Tressider; Australia	Georges Gaignard; France
Men's individual pursuit	Leandro Faggin; Italy	Peter Brotherton; Great Britain	Norman Sheil; Great Britain

== Medal table ==
Rank	Nation	Gold	Silver	Bronze	Total
1	Great Britain (GBR)	2	1	1	4
2	Italy (ITA)	2	0	1	3
3	Belgium (BEL)	1	0	0	1
4	Netherlands (NED)	0	2	0	2
5	Australia (AUS)	0	1	1	2
6	Switzerland (SUI)	0	1	0	1
7	France (FRA)	0	0	1	1
7	Luxembourg (LUX)	0	0	1	1
Totals (8 entries)		5	5	5	15

== See also ==
- 1954 UCI Road World Championships
