= David Sharp =

David Sharp or Dave Sharp may refer to:

- Dave Sharp (bass guitarist), American, touring musician for the Melvins
- Dave Sharp (born 1959), English guitarist
- David Sharp (cyclist) (born 1941), American Olympic cyclist
- David Sharp (entomologist) (1840–1922), British entomologist
- David Sharp (mountaineer) (1972–2006), English mountaineer

== See also ==
- David Sharpe (disambiguation)
