= Vladimir Leonov =

Vladimir Leonov may refer to:

- Vladimir Leonov (motorcycle racer) (b. 1987), Russian motorcycle racer
- Vladimir Leonov (ice hockey) (1937–2003), Russian ice hockey player
- Vladimir Leonov (cycling) (b. 1937), Russian Olympic cyclist
