= South Africa at the 1960 Summer Olympics =

- IOC code: RSA (SAF used at these Games)
- NOC: South African Sports Confederation and Olympic Committee

in Rome
- Competitors: 55 (53 men and 2 women) in 12 sports
- Flag bearer: Manie van Zyl
- Medals Ranked 28th: Gold 0 Silver 1 Bronze 2 Total 3

Summer Olympics appearances (overview)
- 1904; 1908; 1912; 1920; 1924; 1928; 1932; 1936; 1948; 1952; 1956; 1960; 1964–1988; 1992; 1996; 2000; 2004; 2008; 2012; 2016; 2020; 2024

The Union of South Africa competed at the 1960 Summer Olympics in Rome, Italy. 55 competitors, 53 men and 2 women, took part in 46 events in 12 sports. After these Olympics, the International Olympic Committee banned South Africa from the Olympic Movement over the policy of apartheid, making these the last Olympics at which South Africa would compete until the repeal of apartheid and the 1992 Summer Olympics in Barcelona, Spain.

== Medalists ==
=== Silver ===
- Daniel Bekker – Boxing, Men's Heavyweight

=== Bronze ===
- Malcolm Spence – Athletics, Men's 400 metres
- William Meyers – Boxing, Men's Featherweight

== Athletics ==
Men's Discus Throw

- Fanie du Plessis

- Qualifying Heat – 51.86 (→ did not advance, 23rd place)

== Cycling ==
Five male cyclists represented South Africa in 1960.

1000m time trial

- Les Haupt

Tandem

- Les Haupt
- Syd Byrnes

Team pursuit

- Syd Byrnes
- Bobby Fowler
- Abe Jonker
- Rowan Peacock

== Modern pentathlon ==
One male pentathlete represented South Africa in 1960.

Individual

- Okkie van Greunen

== Rowing ==
South Africa had five male rowers participate in two out of seven rowing events in 1960.

Men's single sculls

- David Meineke

Men's coxless four

- David Lord
- Jack Mok
- Trevor Steyn
- John Stocchi

== Sailing ==
South Africa had two male rowers participate in Sailing events in 1960.

Finn

- Gordon Burn-Wood

Flying Dutchman

- Hellmut Stauch

== Shooting ==
Five shooters represented South Africa in 1960.

300 m rifle, three positions

- Michiel Victor

50 m rifle, three positions

- Johannes Human
- Michiel Victor

50 m rifle, prone

- Johannes Human
- David du Plessis

Trap

- Wim Peeters
- Eric Lucke

== Swimming ==
Men

Athlete	Event	Heat		Semifinal		Final	
Athlete	Event	Time	Rank	Time	Rank	Time	Rank
Aubrey Bürer	100 m freestyle	56.3	=3 Q	56.5	=7 Q	56.3	7
Aubrey Bürer	400 m freestyle	4:31.9	11	—N/a		Did not advance	
Murray McLachlan	400 m freestyle	4:25.9	6 Q	—N/a		4:26.3	6
Aubrey Bürer	1500 m freestyle	18:17.8	9	—N/a		Did not advance	
Murray McLachlan	1500 m freestyle	18:09.9	8 Q	—N/a		17:44.9	6

Women

Athlete	Event	Heat		Final	
Athlete	Event	Time	Rank	Time	Rank
Laura Ranwell	100 m backstroke	1:12.0	=4 Q	1:11.4	4

== Water polo ==
=== Group C ===
Team	Pld	W	D	L	GF	GA	GD	Pts
Yugoslavia	3	3	0	0	15	4	+11	6
Netherlands	3	1	1	1	9	8	+1	3
South Africa	3	1	1	1	7	12	−5	3
Australia	3	0	0	3	7	14	−7	0

Source: sports-reference.com
