= Tony Marchant =

Tony Marchant may refer to:

- Tony Marchant (cyclist) (born 1937), former Australian Olympic track cyclist
- Tony Marchant (playwright) (born 1959), British playwright and television dramatist
- Tony Marchant (rugby league), rugby league footballer of the 1980s and 1990s for Great Britain, Castleford, and Dewsbury
