= Dieter Gieseler =

German cyclist

Personal information
- Born: 10 January 1941 Münster, Germany
- Died: 8 February 2008 (aged 67) Amelunxen, Germany

Cycling career
- Sport: Cycling
Medal record
Men's cycling
Representing Germany
Olympic Games
Silver medal – second place	1960 Rome	1000m time trial

Dieter Gieseler (10 January 1941 – 8 February 2008) was a German cyclist. He won the silver medal in 1000m time trial in the 1960 Summer Olympics
