= Eric Thompson (cyclist) =

British cyclist (1927–1996)

Personal information
- Born: 9 July 1927 Derby, Derbyshire, England
- Died: 23 May 1996 (aged 68) Spain

Cycling career
- Sport: Cycling

Amateur team
- East Midlands Clarion
Medal record
Representing ENG
Men's cycling
Commonwealth Games
Gold medal – first place	1954 Vancouver	Road Race

Eric Gordon Thompson (9 July 1927 – 23 May 1996) was a British cyclist who competed at two Olympic Games.

== Biography ==
At the 1956 Olympic Games in Melbourne, Thomspon competed in the tandem sprint with Peter Brotherton and only just missed out on a medal, finishing fourth.

Thompson represented the English team at the 1954 British Empire and Commonwealth Games held in Vancouver, Canada, where he won the gold medal in the road race.

He went to his second Olympic Games in 1960, reaching the quarter-final of the men's tandem sprint with David Handley.

He died after cycling across Spain with friends in May 1996. He had been president of the Derby Mercury cycling club and took part in the first running of the Dovedale Dash.

== Achievements ==
Date	Location	Race
1954	(Canada) Vancouver	Road
1956	(Australia) Melbourne	Tandem
1960	(Italy) Rome	Tandem
