= Vanegas (surname) =

Vanegas is a surname. Notable people with the surname include:

- David Vanegas (born 1986), Colombian golfer
- Erika Vanegas (born 1988), Mexican footballer
- Henry Vanegas (born 1960), Colombian footballer and manager
- Manuela Vanegas (born 2000), Colombian footballer
- Mario Vanegas (born 1939), Colombian cyclist
- Trent Vanegas (born 1974), American blogger
