= Cyperus diamantinus =

Scientific classification
- Kingdom: Plantae
- Clade: Tracheophytes
- Clade: Angiosperms
- Clade: Monocots
- Clade: Commelinids
- Order: Poales
- Family: Cyperaceae
- Genus: Cyperus
- Species: C. diamantinus

Binomial name
- Cyperus diamantinus (D.A.Simpson) Govaerts

Species of sedge

Cyperus diamantinus is a species of sedge that is native to south eastern Brazil.

== See also ==
- List of Cyperus species
