= Ian Chapman =

Ian Chapman may refer to:

- Ian Chapman (cyclist) (born 1939), Australian Olympic cyclist
- Ian Chapman (footballer) (born 1970), English footballer
- Ian Chapman (physicist), chief executive of the United Kingdom Atomic Energy Authority
