= Cyperus pseudopilosus =

Scientific classification
- Kingdom: Plantae
- Clade: Tracheophytes
- Clade: Angiosperms
- Clade: Monocots
- Clade: Commelinids
- Order: Poales
- Family: Cyperaceae
- Genus: Cyperus
- Species: C. pseudopilosus

Binomial name
- Cyperus pseudopilosus (C.B.Clarke) Govaerts, 2007

Species of sedge

Cyperus pseudopilosus is a species of sedge that is native to tropical and western parts of the Africa.

== See also ==
- List of Cyperus species
