= Lothar Stäber =

German cyclist

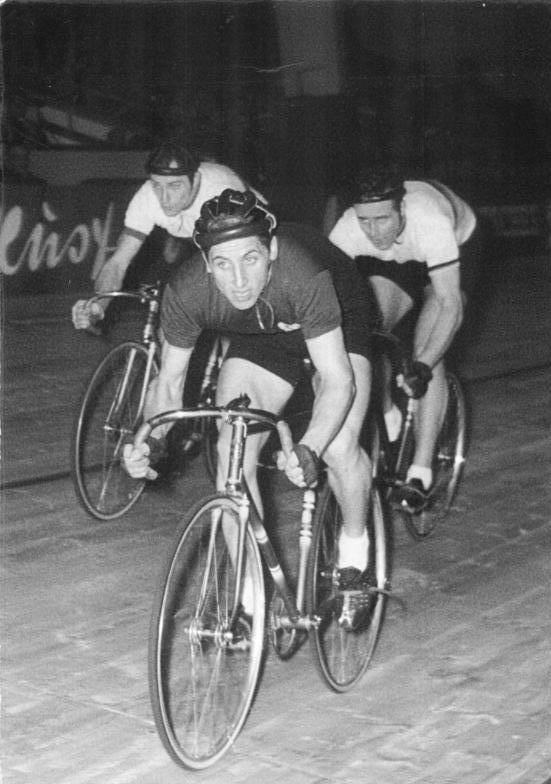
- Lothar Stäber (front) with Jürgen Simon (left) and Hans Wagner (right) in 1957

Personal information
- Born: 4 May 1936 (age 90) Erfurt, Germany

Cycling career
- Sport: Cycling
Medal record
Men's cycling
Representing Germany
Olympic Games
Silver medal – second place	1960 Rome	Tandem

Lothar Stäber (4 May 1936 - 19 December 2025) was a former German cyclist who competed for the SC Dynamo Berlin / Sportvereinigung (SV) Dynamo. He won many titles during his career.

He competed in the tandem event at the 1960 Summer Olympics where he won a silver medal.
