= Helbling =

Helbling is a surname. Notable people with the surname include:

- Jeanne Helbling (1903–1985), French actress
- Josef Helbling (1935–2024), Swiss cyclist
- Seifried Helbling, 13th-century Austrian poet
- Thomas Helbling (born 1961), Swiss lawyer and politician
- Timo Helbling (born 1981), Swiss ice hockey player
