= Empire Oval =

Sporting venue in Vancouver, Canada

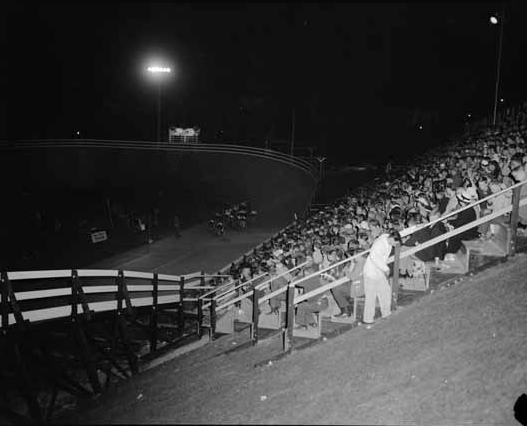
- Track cycling during the games. Attribution:Province newspaper
- Location: China Creek Park, Vancouver, Canada

Construction
- Opened: start 1954; 72 years ago
- Demolished: 1980; 46 years ago

The Empire Oval or Broadway Bowl was an outdoor cycling velodrome that existed from 1954 to 1980 and was located at China Creek Park in Vancouver, Canada.

== History ==
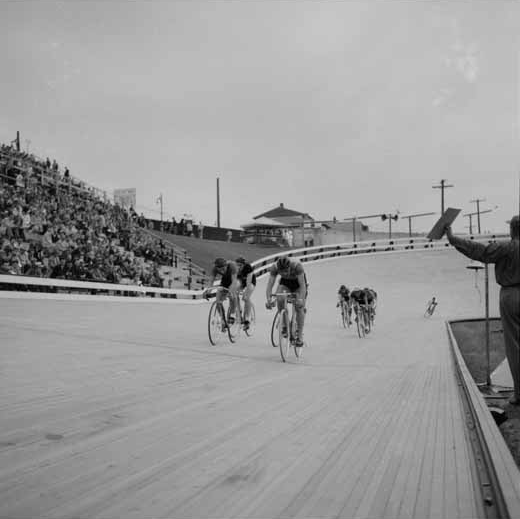
Scratch race in progress. Attribution:Province newspaper

The origins of the Empire Bowl date back to June 1951, when $135,000 was set aside for health purposes and a new park to appease China Creek residents who complained at the stench left by the decaying garbage on what was effectively a rubbish dump.

China Creek Park was chosen as the site for a new velodrome for the 1954 British Empire and Commonwealth Games and at a cost of $63,713 the Jarvis Construction Company Ltd built a 250 meter track consisting of 100,000 pieces of wood, with capacity for 2,000 spectators.

It was constructed on time (although significantly over budget) to host the British Empire and Commonwealth Games cycling programme.

After a period of success including holding the National Championships, the oval was earmarked for demolition in 1966 due to the requirement for repairs and finance issues experienced by the city council. However it remained open and volunteer groups repaired the track in 1973 at the cost of $150,000 after securing funding. The site was sold in 1980 to the Vancouver Community College, which resulted in the closure and subsequent demolition of the oval after the final meeting on 3 September 1980.
