= Herbert Francis =

American cyclist

Personal information
- Born: May 26, 1940 Miami, Florida, United States
- Died: September 20, 1988 (aged 48)

Cycling career
- Sport: Cycling

Herbert Francis (May 26, 1940 – September 20, 1988) was an American cyclist. He competed in the sprint event at the 1960 Summer Olympics.
