= Tony Hoar =

British cyclist (1932–2019)

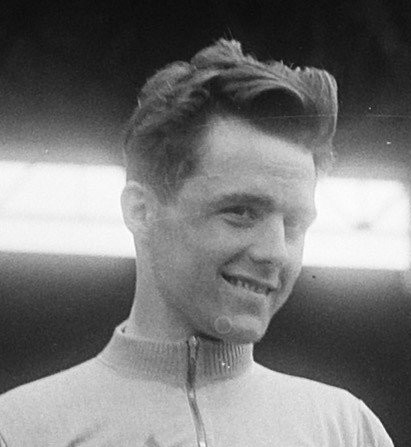
- Hoar in 1955

Personal information
- Born: 15 February 1932 Emsworth, Hampshire, England
- Died: 5 October 2019 (aged 87)

Cycling career
- Sport: Cycling
- Discipline: Road
- Role: Rider

Amateur team
- Emsworth CC

Professional teams
- 1955: Hercules Cycles
- 1956: Cilo - Saint-Raphaël

Tony Hoar (10 February 1932 – 5 October 2019) was a British racing cyclist.

== Biography ==
Hoar represented the English team at the 1954 British Empire and Commonwealth Games held in Vancouver, Canada, where he participated in the road race.

He gained selection for the Tour de France, where he finished in last place in the 1955 Tour de France.
