= Francisco Tortellá =

Spanish cyclist

Personal information
- Born: 2 September 1937 (age 89) Sineu, Spain

Cycling career
- Sport: Cycling

Francisco Tortellá (born 2 September 1937) is a Spanish former cyclist. He competed in the sprint and team pursuit events at the 1960 Summer Olympics.
