= Cenobio Ruiz =

Mexican cyclist (1934–1999)

Personal information
- Born: 23 March 1934 Tlahualilo, Mexico
- Died: 20 April 1999 (aged 65)

Cycling career
- Sport: Cycling

Cenobio Ruiz (23 March 1934 – 20 April 1999) was a Mexican cyclist. He competed in the sprint event at the 1960 Summer Olympics.
