= Luis Muciño =

Mexican cyclist

Personal information
- Born: 24 April 1936 (age 90) Mexico City, Mexico

Cycling career
- Sport: Cycling

Luis Muciño (born 24 April 1936) is a former Mexican cyclist. He competed in the sprint and tandem events at the 1960 Summer Olympics.
