= Peter Hirzel =

Swiss cyclist

Personal information
- Born: 15 July 1939 Zürich, Switzerland
- Died: 4 October 2017 (aged 78)

Cycling career
- Sport: Cycling

Peter Hirzel (15 July 1939 – 4 October 2017) was a Swiss cyclist. He competed in the tandem event at the 1960 Summer Olympics.
