= Dušan Škvarenina =

Slovak cyclist

Personal information
- Born: 16 October 1939 Korompa, Hungary
- Died: 16 September 1997 (aged 57) Bratislava, Slovakia

Cycling career
- Sport: Cycling

Dušan Škvarenina (16 October 1939 – 16 September 1997) was a Slovak cyclist. He competed in the tandem event at the 1960 Summer Olympics.
