= Jack Hartman (cyclist) =

American cyclist (born 1937)

Personal information
- Born: April 23, 1937 (age 89) Olympia, Washington, United States

Cycling career
- Sport: Cycling

Jack Hartman (born April 23, 1937) is a former American cyclist. He competed in the tandem event at the 1960 Summer Olympics. He finished second at the 1959 United States Cycling National Championships and third in 1957. He was Junior United States cycling champion in 1953.

He later founded the Los Gatos Bicycle Racing Club (LGBRC) with Bob Tetzlaff in 1961.
