= Günter Kaslowski =

German cyclist

Personal information
- Born: 5 July 1934 Berlin, Germany
- Died: 26 June 2001 (aged 66) Berlin, Germany

Cycling career
- Sport: Cycling

Günter Kaslowski (5 July 1934 – 26 June 2001) was a German cyclist. He competed in the sprint event at the 1960 Summer Olympics.
