= Kurt Rechsteiner =

Swiss cyclist

Personal information
- Born: 8 January 1931 Speicher, Switzerland
- Died: 2017 (aged 85–86)

Cycling career
- Sport: Cycling

Kurt Rechsteiner (8 January 1931 – 2017) was a Swiss cyclist. He competed in the sprint event at the 1960 Summer Olympics.
