= Gilbert De Rieck =

Belgian cyclist

Personal information
- Born: 28 September 1936 (age 90) Merelbeke, Belgium
- Height: 5 ft 7 in (170 cm)
- Weight: 68 kg (150 lb)

Cycling career
- Sport: Cycling

Gilbert De Rieck (born 28 September 1936) is a former Belgian cyclist. He competed in the sprint event at the 1960 Summer Olympics.
