= Roland Surrugue =

French cyclist

Personal information
- Born: 6 August 1938 Saint-Germain-en-Laye, France
- Died: 28 June 1997 (aged 58) Sengeløse, Denmark

Cycling career
- Sport: Cycling

Roland Surrugue (6 August 1938 – 28 June 1997) was a French cyclist. He competed in the tandem event at the 1960 Summer Olympics.
