= Fritz Neuser =

German cyclist (born 1932)

Personal information
- Born: 14 April 1932 (age 94) Nürnberg, Germany

Cycling career
- Sport: Cycling
- Disciplines: Track, road

Friedrich "Fritz" Neuser (born 14 April 1932) is a former German cyclist. He competed in the tandem sprint at the 1956 Summer Olympics, and finished last after a crash during a repechage round.

Domestically Neuser won national titles in the tandem sprint in 1952, 1954, and 1955, in the individual pursuit in 1954, and in the team time trial in 1951. He finished second in the tandem sprint in 1953, 1956, and 1957, on the road in 1954 and in the team time trial in 1956. After retiring from cycling he competed in car races and became a successful car dealer, specializing in renovating classic Italian sports cars.
