= David Sharpe =

David Sharpe may refer to:

- David Sharpe (actor) (1910–1980), American actor and stunt performer
- David Sharpe (American football) (born 1995), American football player
- David Sharpe (football club chairman) (born 1991), British football club chairman
- David Sharpe (politician) (born 1946), American politician in the Vermont House of Representatives
- David Sharpe (runner) (born 1967), former British middle-distance runner
- David Sharpe (swimmer) (born 1990), Canadian swimmer
- David Sharpe (artist) (born 1944), American artist

== See also ==
- David Sharp (disambiguation)
