= André Gruchet =

French cyclist (1933–2015)

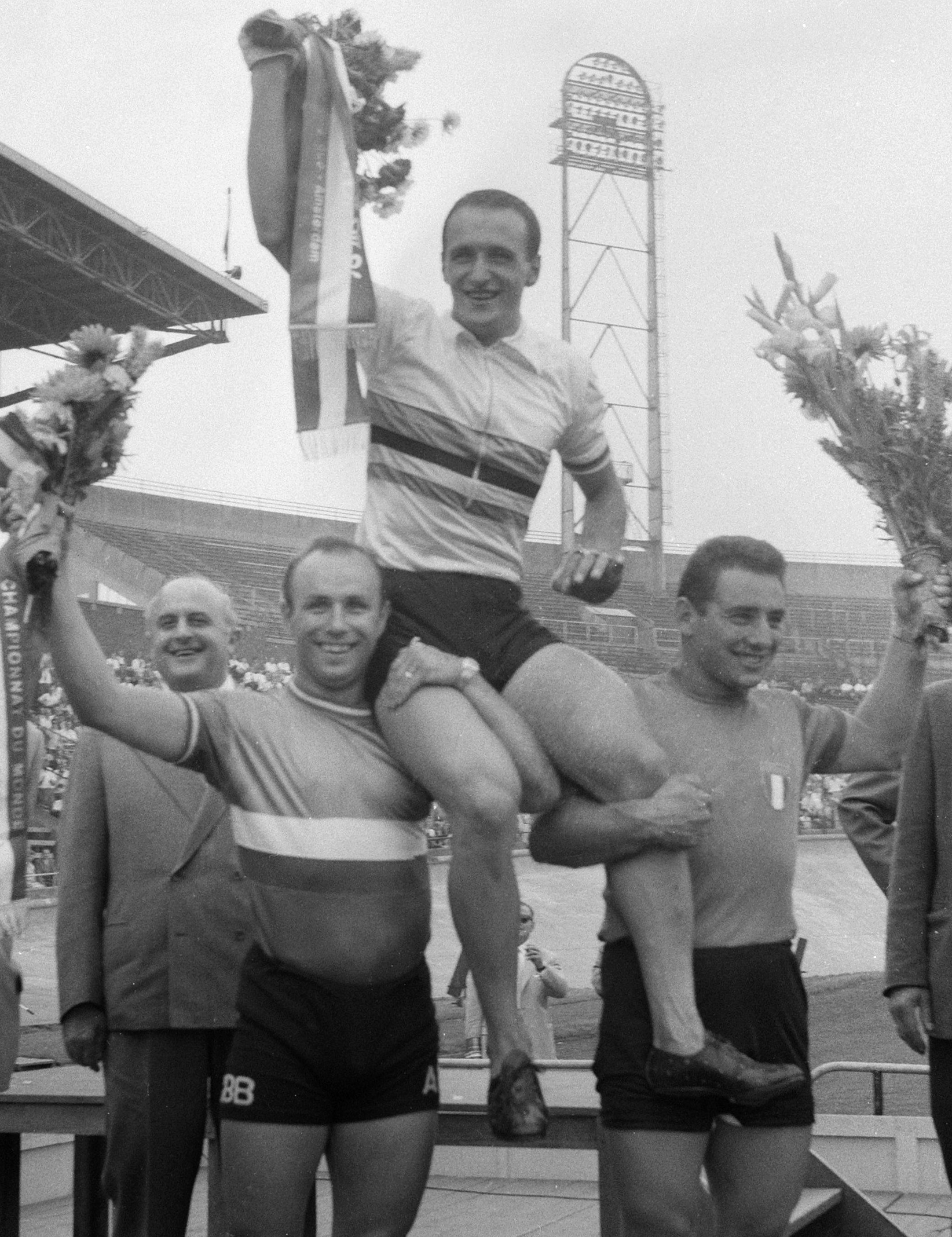
- André Gruchet, Valentino Gasparella and Sante Gaiardoni at the 1959 World Championships

Personal information
- Born: 17 April 1933 Epinay-sur-Seine, France
- Died: 3 May 2015 (aged 82)
- Height: 165 cm (5 ft 5 in)
- Weight: 69 kg (152 lb)

Cycling career
- Sport: Cycling
- Discipline: Track
Medal record
Representing France
World championships
Bronze medal – third place	1959 Amsterdam	Sprint

André Gruchet (French: [ɑ̃dʁe ɡʁyʃɛ]; 17 April 1933 – 3 May 2015) was a French track cyclist who won a bronze medal in the sprint at the 1959 World Championships. He also competed in the tandem event at the 1956 Summer Olympics and the sprint event at the 1960 Summer Olympics.
