= August Rieke =

German cyclist

Personal information
- Born: 26 May 1935 (age 91) Hiddenhausen, Germany

Cycling career
- Sport: Cycling

August Rieke (born 26 May 1935) is a German former cyclist. He competed in the sprint event at the 1960 Summer Olympics.
