= Donald Ferguson (cyclist) =

American cyclist

Personal information
- Born: April 28, 1921 Evanston, Illinois, United States
- Died: August 15, 1985 (aged 64)

Cycling career
- Sport: Cycling

Donald Ferguson (April 28, 1921 – August 15, 1985) was an American cyclist. He competed in the tandem event at the 1956 Summer Olympics.
