= Keith Harrison (cyclist) =

British cyclist (born 1933)

Personal information
- Born: 28 March 1933 (age 93) Birmingham, England

Cycling career
- Sport: Cycling

Amateur team
- Wyndham RCC
Medal record
Cycling
Representing England
British Empire & Commonwealth Games
Silver medal – second place	1954 Vancouver	10 mile scratch
Bronze medal – third place	1954 Vancouver	1km time trial

Keith John Harrison (born 28 March 1933) is a former British cyclist who competed at the 1956 Summer Olympics.

== Biography ==
At the 1956 Olympic Games in Melbourne, Harrison competed in the sprint event.

He represented the English team at the 1954 British Empire and Commonwealth Games held in Vancouver, Canada, where he won the silver medal in the 10 miles scratch race and a bronze medal in the time trial.

He also represented the England team in three more events at the 1958 British Empire and Commonwealth Games in Cardiff, Wales. In 1955 he won the International Champion of Champions sprint at Herne Hill velodrome.
