= Mees Gerritsen =

Dutch cyclist

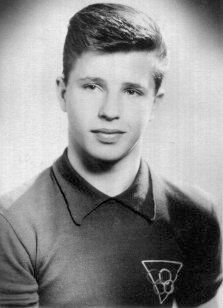
- Mees Gerritsen in 1960

Personal information
- Born: 15 September 1939 (age 86) Amsterdam, the Netherlands

Sport
- Sport: Cycling

Melis "Mees" Gerritsen (born 15 September 1939) is a retired Dutch track cyclist who finished in fourth place in the 2 km tandem event at the 1960 Summer Olympics.

== See also ==
- List of Dutch Olympic cyclists
