= Don Skene =

Welsh racing cyclist

Personal information
- Born: 1936 (age 89–90) Cardiff, Wales

Cycling career
- Sport: Cycling
- Disciplines: Track & Road
- Role: Rider

Amateur teams
- 1951: Tigers Cycling Club
- 1954: Cardiff Byways RCC

Major wins
- British Champion
Medal record
Cycling
Representing (Wales)
British Empire & Commonwealth Games
Bronze medal – third place	1954 Vancouver	10 miles scratch
Bronze medal – third place	1958 Cardiff	10 miles scratch

Donald J. C. Skene (born 1936), is a Welsh former racing cyclist who won consecutive bronze medals at the Commonwealth Games.

== Biography ==
Skene represented the Welsh team at the British Empire and Commonwealth Games on several occasions, the first time in 1954 in the 10 km scratch race, the kilo and the road race (100 km), winning a bronze medal in the 10 miles scratch event.

He represented the Welsh team again at the 1958 British Empire and Commonwealth Games in the 10 km scratch race, the kilo and the sprint and won another brionze medal in the 10 miles scratch race. Four years later he went to the Commonwealth Games for the final time in 1962, competing once again in the 10 km scratch race, the kilo and the sprint.

He rode many international races representing the R.A.F. and British national teams, in South Africa, Guiana in South America and on the continent.

Skene began racing at the age of 15, joining the Tigers Cycling Club, and at 16 in 1952, he opened a small bicycle shop on Rumney Hill, Newport Road, Cardiff. He ran the business for 53 years before passing on control of the business to his daughter Liane and son Jon in 2005. The shop also sponsors the Team Skene cycling team. Don has since retired and now lives in Florida, in the United States.

== Palmarès ==
1954	3rd Scratch race, British Empire and Commonwealth Games
1958	3rd Scratch race, British Empire and Commonwealth Games
