= Philip Waring =

Welsh cyclist

Personal information
- Nationality: British (Welsh)
- Born: c. 1929 Pontypool, Wales

Sport
- Sport: Cycling
- Event(s): Track and Road
- Club: Pontypool RC

Philip R. Waring (born c.1929) is a former racing cyclist from Wales, who represented Wales at the British Empire Games (now Commonwealth Games).

== Biography ==
Waring, born in Pontypool, Wales, was a member of the Pontypool Racing Club and was an all-round cyclist, racing primarily on the roads but also on the tracks.

At the 1954 British Empire and Commonwealth Games in Vancouver, Canada, he represented the Welsh team and participated in the road race, scratch, time trial and pursuit events.

Waring was one of three Welsh cyclists attending the games and was eliminated in the time trial heats but was prominent throughout the road race.
