= Boncho Novakov =

Bulgarian cyclist

Personal information
- Born: 7 May 1935 (age 91) Razgrad, Bulgaria

Cycling career
- Sport: Cycling

Boncho Novakov (Bulgarian: Бончо Новаков, born 7 May 1935) is a former Bulgarian cyclist. He competed in the 1000m time trial at the 1960 Summer Olympics.
