= Bernard Pusey =

British cyclist (born 1930)

Personal information
- Nationality: British (English)
- Born: 11 February 1930 (age 96) Tadworth, Surrey, England

Sport
- Sport: Cycling
- Events: Pursuit, Road
- Club: Redhill CC
Medal record
Cycling
Representing England
British Empire & Commonwealth Games
Bronze medal – third place	1954 Vancouver	road race

Bernard G. Pusey (born 11 February 1930) is an English former competitive cyclist.

== Biography ==
Pusey represented the English team at the 1954 British Empire and Commonwealth Games held in Vancouver, Canada, where he won the bronze medal in the road race.

He was a member of Redhill Cycling Club.
