= Juraj Miklušica =

Slovak cyclist

Personal information
- Born: 14 April 1938 Bratislava, Czechoslovakia
- Died: 26 August 2018 (aged 80) Bratislava, Slovakia

Cycling career
- Sport: Cycling

Juraj Miklušica (14 April 1938 – 26 August 2018) was a Slovak cyclist. He competed in the tandem event at the 1960 Summer Olympics.
