= Rinus Paul =

Dutch cyclist

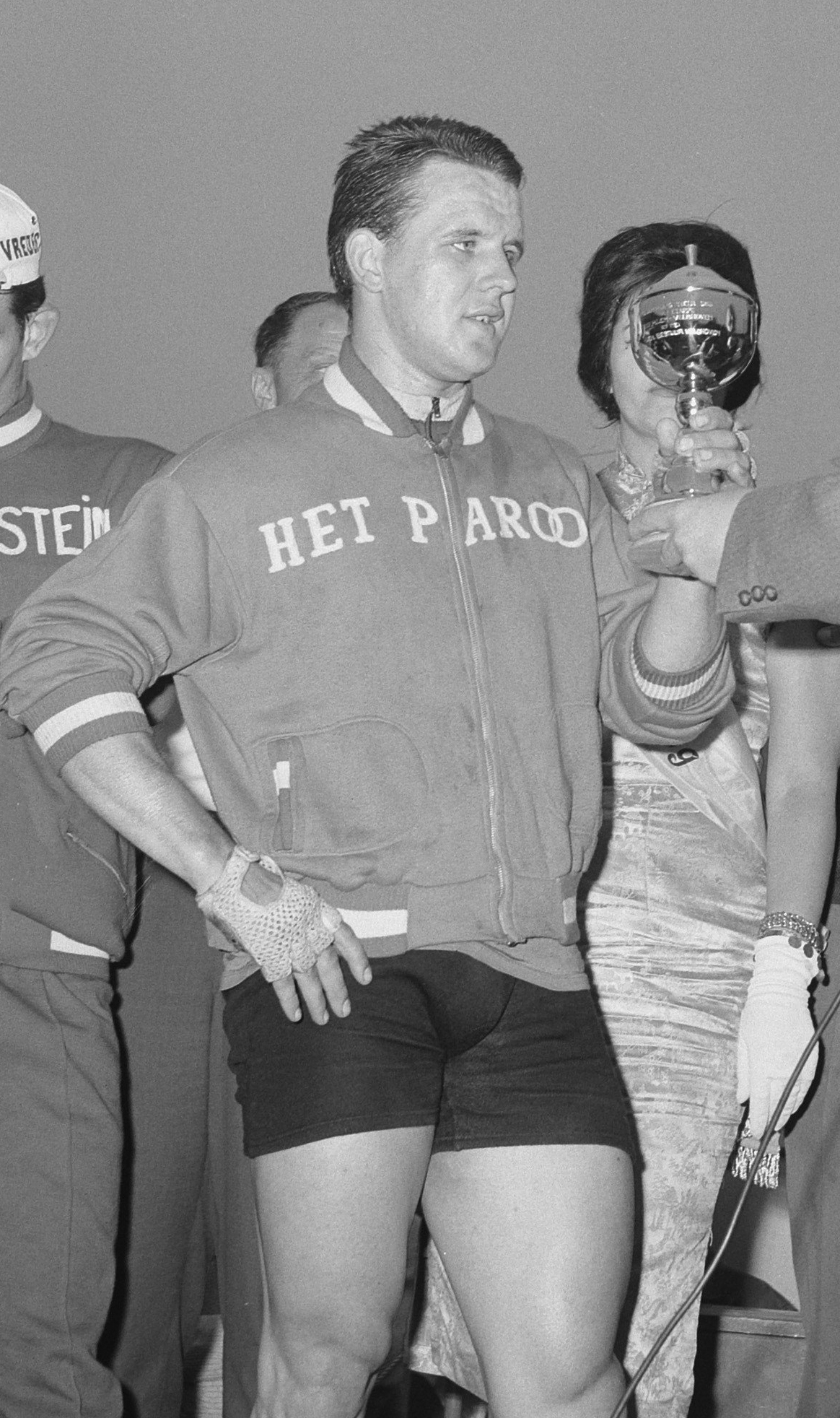
- Rinus Paul after winning the 4th stage of the 1963 Olympia's Tour

Personal information
- Born: 17 August 1941 (age 85) The Hague, the Netherlands
- Height: 1.71 m (5 ft 7 in)
- Weight: 79 kg (174 lb)

Sport
- Sport: Cycling

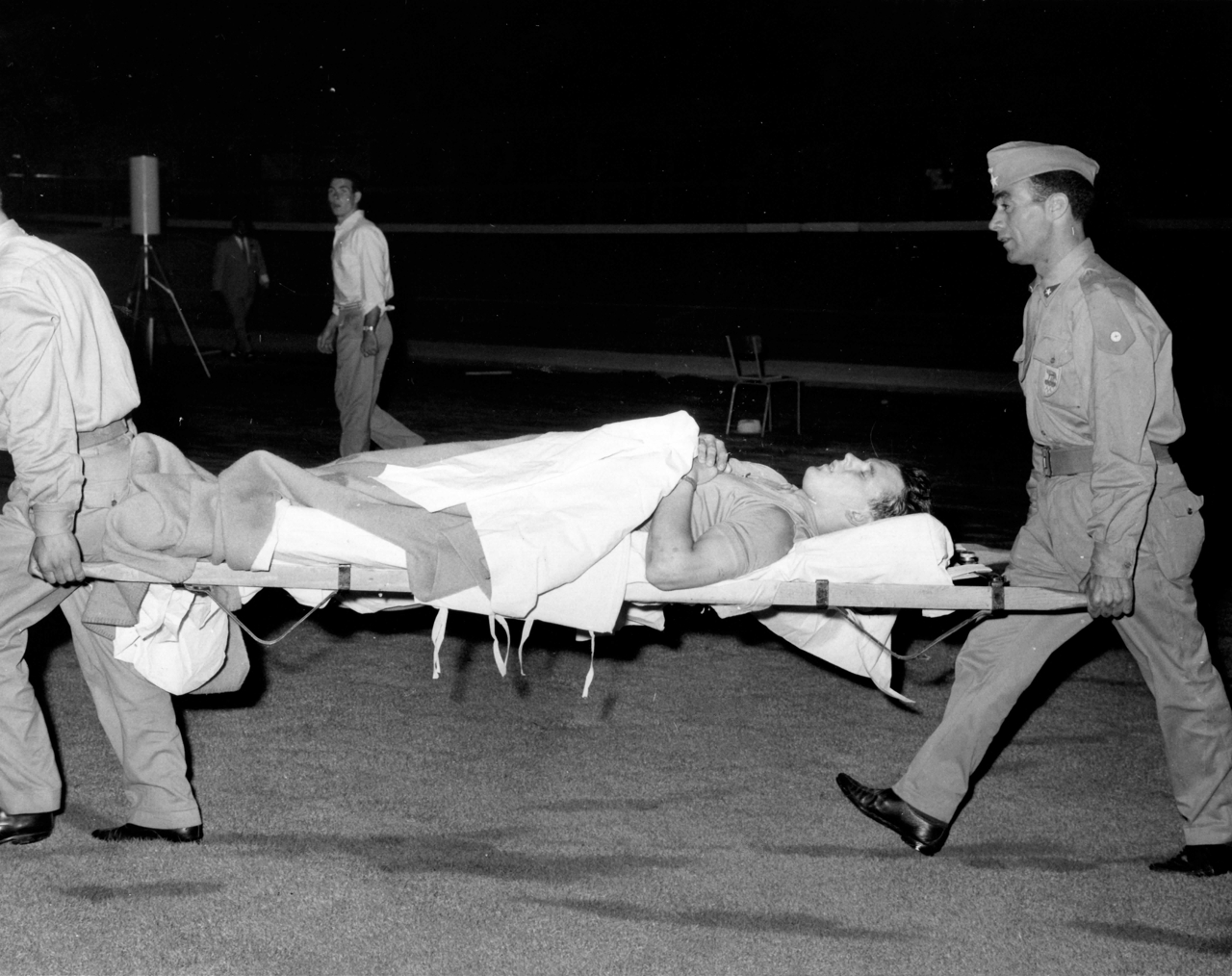
Paul injured at the 1960 Olympics

Marinus Cornelis "Rinus" Paul (born 17 August 1941) is a retired Dutch road and track cyclist. On track, he placed fourth in the 2 km tandem event at the 1960 Summer Olympics. On the road, he won the Ronde van Zuid-Holland in 1960 and Ronde van Noord-Holland in 1963, as well as one stage of the Olympia's Tour in 1963.

== See also ==
- List of Dutch Olympic cyclists
