= 1955 UCI Track Cycling World Championships =

- Venue: Milan, Italy
- Date: 31 Augustus - 5 September 1955
- Velodrome: Velodromo Vigorelli
- Events: 5

The 1955 UCI Track Cycling World Championships were the World Championship for track cycling. They took place in Milan, Italy from 31 August to 5 September 1955. Five events for men were contested, three for professionals and two for amateurs.

== Medal summary ==
Event	Gold	Silver	Bronze
Men's Professional Events
Men's sprint	Antonio Maspes; Italy	Oscar Plattner; Switzerland	Arie van Vliet; Netherlands
Men's individual pursuit	Guido Messina; Italy	René Strehler; Switzerland	Wim van Est; Netherlands
Men's motor-paced	Guillermo Timoner; Spain	Walter Bucher; Switzerland	Giuseppe Martino; Italy
Men's Amateur Events
Men's sprint	Giuseppe Ogna; Italy	Jorge Bátiz; Argentina	John Tressider; Australia
Men's individual pursuit	Norman Sheil; Great Britain	Peter Brotherton; Great Britain	Leandro Faggin; Italy

== Medal table ==
Rank	Nation	Gold	Silver	Bronze	Total
1	Italy (ITA)	3	0	2	5
2	Great Britain (GBR)	1	1	0	2
3	Spain (ESP)	1	0	0	1
4	Switzerland (SUI)	0	3	0	3
5	Argentina (ARG)	0	1	0	1
6	Netherlands (NED)	0	0	2	2
7	Australia (AUS)	0	0	1	1
Totals (7 entries)		5	5	5	15

== See also ==
- 1955 UCI Road World Championships
