= Peter Vogel (cyclist) =

Swiss cyclist (1939–2021)

Personal information
- Born: 5 August 1939 Glarus, Switzerland
- Died: 26 April 2021 (aged 81) Bülach, Switzerland

Cycling career
- Sport: Cycling

Peter Vogel (5 August 1939 – 26 April 2021) was a Swiss cyclist. He competed in the tandem event at the 1960 Summer Olympics.

Vogel died on 26 April 2021, at the age of 81.
