= Martin McKay =

Irish cyclist

Personal information
- Born: 5 June 1937 Belfast, Northern Ireland
- Died: 14 June 2007 (aged 70) Allentown, Pennsylvania, United States
- Height: 180 cm (5 ft 11 in)
- Weight: 75 kg (165 lb)

Cycling career
- Sport: Cycling

Amateur team
- Maryland Wheelers, Belfast

Martin McKay (5 June 1937 – 14 June 2007) was a cyclist from Northern Ireland who competed at the 1960 Summer Olympics.

== Biography ==
At the 1960 Olympic Games in Rome, McKay participated in the sprint event.

McKay represented the 1958 Northern Irish Team at the 1958 British Empire and Commonwealth Games in Cardiff, Wales, participating in one cycling program event; the road race.
