= János Söre =

Hungarian cyclist (1935–2023)

Personal information
- Born: 14 May 1935 Budapest, Hungary
- Died: 11 June 2023 (aged 88)

Cycling career
- Sport: Cycling

János Söre (14 May 1935 – 11 June 2023) was a Hungarian cyclist. He competed in the 1000m time trial at the 1960 Summer Olympics.

Söre died on 11 June 2023, at the age of 88.
