= Antoine Pellegrina =

French cyclist

Personal information
- Born: 21 September 1933 (age 93) Sutrio, Italy

Cycling career
- Sport: Cycling

Antoine Pellegrina (born 21 September 1933) is a French former cyclist. He competed in the sprint event at the 1960 Summer Olympics.
