= Leo Sterckx =

Belgian cyclist (1936–2023)

Personal information
- Born: 16 July 1936 Antwerp, Belgium
- Died: 4 March 2023 (aged 86)

Cycling career
- Sport: Cycling
Medal record
Representing BEL
Men's cycling
Olympic Games
Silver medal – second place	1960 Rome	Individual sprint

Leo Sterckx (16 July 1936 – 4 March 2023) was a Belgian cyclist. He competed for Belgium at the 1960 Summer Olympics held in Rome, Italy in the individual sprint event where he finished in second place. In 1960 he won the International Champion of Champions sprint at Herne Hill velodrome.

Sterckx died on 4 March 2023, at the age of 86.
