= Michael Horgan (cyclist) =

Irish cyclist (1934–2023)

Personal information
- Born: 12 July 1934 Plymouth, England
- Died: 20 August 2023 (aged 89) South Carolina, U.S.

Cycling career
- Sport: Cycling

Michael A. Horgan (12 July 1934 – 20 August 2023) was an Irish cyclist. He competed in the 1000m time trial and sprint events at the 1960 Summer Olympics. Horgan died in South Carolina, United States on 20 August 2023, at the age of 89.
