= James Davies (cyclist, born 1934) =

Canadian cyclist (1934–2020)

Personal information
- Born: 1934 Vancouver, British Columbia, Canada
- Died: June 2020 (aged 85–86)

Cycling career
- Sport: Cycling

James William Davies (1934 – June 2020) was a Canadian cyclist. He competed in three events at the 1956 Summer Olympics.
