= Rostislav Vargashkin =

Russian cyclist

Personal information
- Born: 2 June 1933 (age 93) Ulan Bator, Mongolian People’s Republic
- Height: 1.73 m (5 ft 8 in)
- Weight: 69 kg (152 lb)

Sport
- Sport: Cycling
- Club: Burevestnik, Moscow; Army Club, Moscow Oblast
Medal record
Representing the Soviet Union
Olympic Games
Bronze medal – third place	1960 Rome	Time trial

Rostislav Yevgenyevich Vargashkin (Russian: Ростислав Евгеньевич Варгашкин; born 2 June 1933) is a retired Russian cyclist who competed at the 1956 and 1960 Summer Olympics. In 1956 he finished last in the 2000 m tandem sprint, due to a crash during a repechage round, whereas in 1960 he won a bronze medal in the 1000 m track time trial. He set five world records: in the 200 m time trial from a flying start (1955 – 11.40) and in the 1000 m time trial, from a standing start (1953 – 1:10.40, 1954 – 1:10.20, 1955 – 1:09.50) and from a flying start (1955 – 1:06.0).

Nationally, he won 13 titles between 1953 and 1963 in the sprint, tandem sprint, team pursuit and time trial.

After retirement he became the head coach of the Russian Cycling Federation. He prepared the Soviet team for the 1964, 1968, 1972 and 1976 Olympics, and was a member of the European and world cycling federations (1993) and the president of the Soviet cycling federation (1989–1996). Vargashkin holds three bicycle-related patents (1981, 1990, 1998) and is the author of one book on time trial cycling (1961). He was twice awarded the Order of the Badge of Honour.
