= Patrick Murphy (cyclist) =

Canadian cyclist (born 1933)

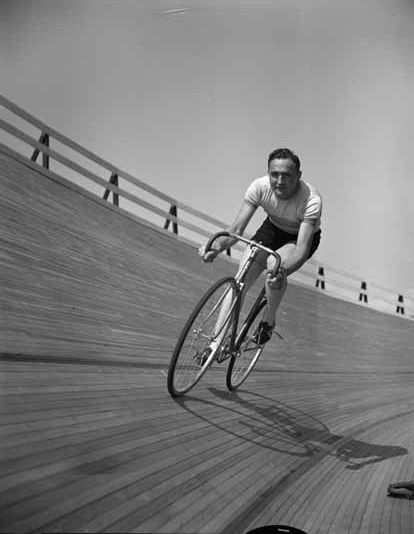
- Murphy at the 1954 British Empire and Commonwealth Games. Attribution:Province newspaper

Personal information
- Born: 7 November 1933 (age 92) Norwich, Ontario, Canada

Cycling career
- Sport: Cycling

James Patrick Murphy (born 7 November 1933) is a former Canadian cyclist. He competed in the individual and team road race events at the 1956 Summer Olympics.
