= Diego Calero =

Colombian cyclist

Personal information
- Born: 30 August 1940 (age 86) Cali, Colombia

Cycling career
- Sport: Cycling

Diego Calero (born 30 August 1940) is a former Colombian cyclist. He competed in the 1000m time trial at the 1960 Summer Olympics.
