= Jürgen Simon =

German cyclist

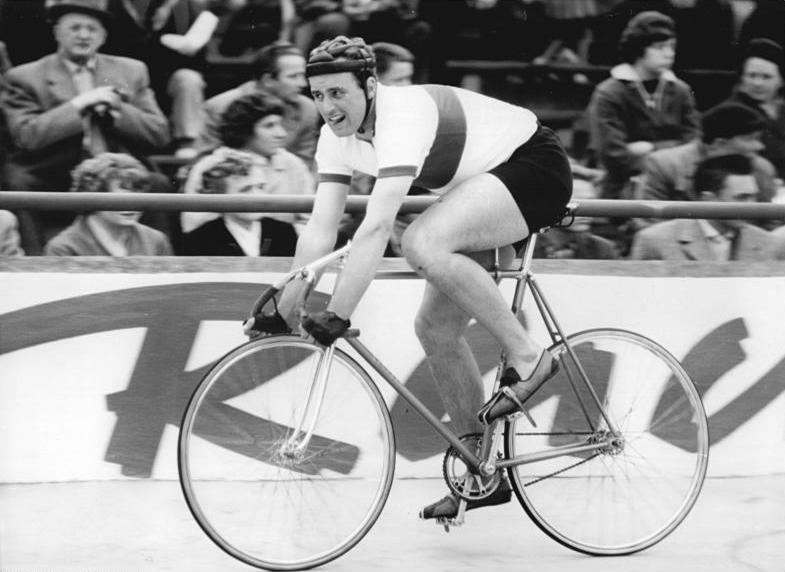

Personal information
- Born: 10 January 1938 Gera, Thuringia, Germany
- Died: 26 October 2003 (aged 65) Quirla, Thuringia, Germany

Cycling career
- Sport: Cycling
- Discipline: Track
- Role: Rider
Medal record
Representing Germany
Men's track cycling
Olympic Games
Silver medal – second place	1960 Rome	Tandem Sprint

Jürgen Simon (10 January 1938 – 26 October 2003) was a German cyclist. He won the silver medal in the Men's Tandem Sprint, 2000 metres at the 1960 Summer Olympics
