= Govaerts =

Govaerts/Govaert is a Flemish or Dutch surname. Notable people with the surname include:

- Abraham Govaerts (1589–1626), Flemish painter
- Benny Govaerts, Belgian Paralympian athlete
- Hendrick Govaerts (1669-1720), Flemish painter
- Jacqueline Govaert (born 1982), Dutch cyclist, songwriter, pianist
- Jean Govaerts (born 1938), Belgian cyclist
- Johan Baptist Govaerts (c. 1701–after 1745), Flemish painter
- Karel Govaert (1900–1972), Belgian racing cyclist
- Luc Govaerts (born 1959), Belgian cyclist
- Rafaël Govaerts (born 1968), Belgian botanist whose standard author abbreviation is Govaerts
- Renée Govaert (born 1962), Belgian rower
