= José Luis Tellez =

Mexican cyclist

Personal information
- Born: 27 April 1938 (age 88) Mexico City, Mexico

Cycling career
- Sport: Cycling

José Luis Tellez (born 27 April 1938) is a former Mexican cyclist. He competed at the 1960 Summer Olympics and the 1964 Summer Olympics.
