= Aad de Graaf =

Dutch cyclist (1939–1995)

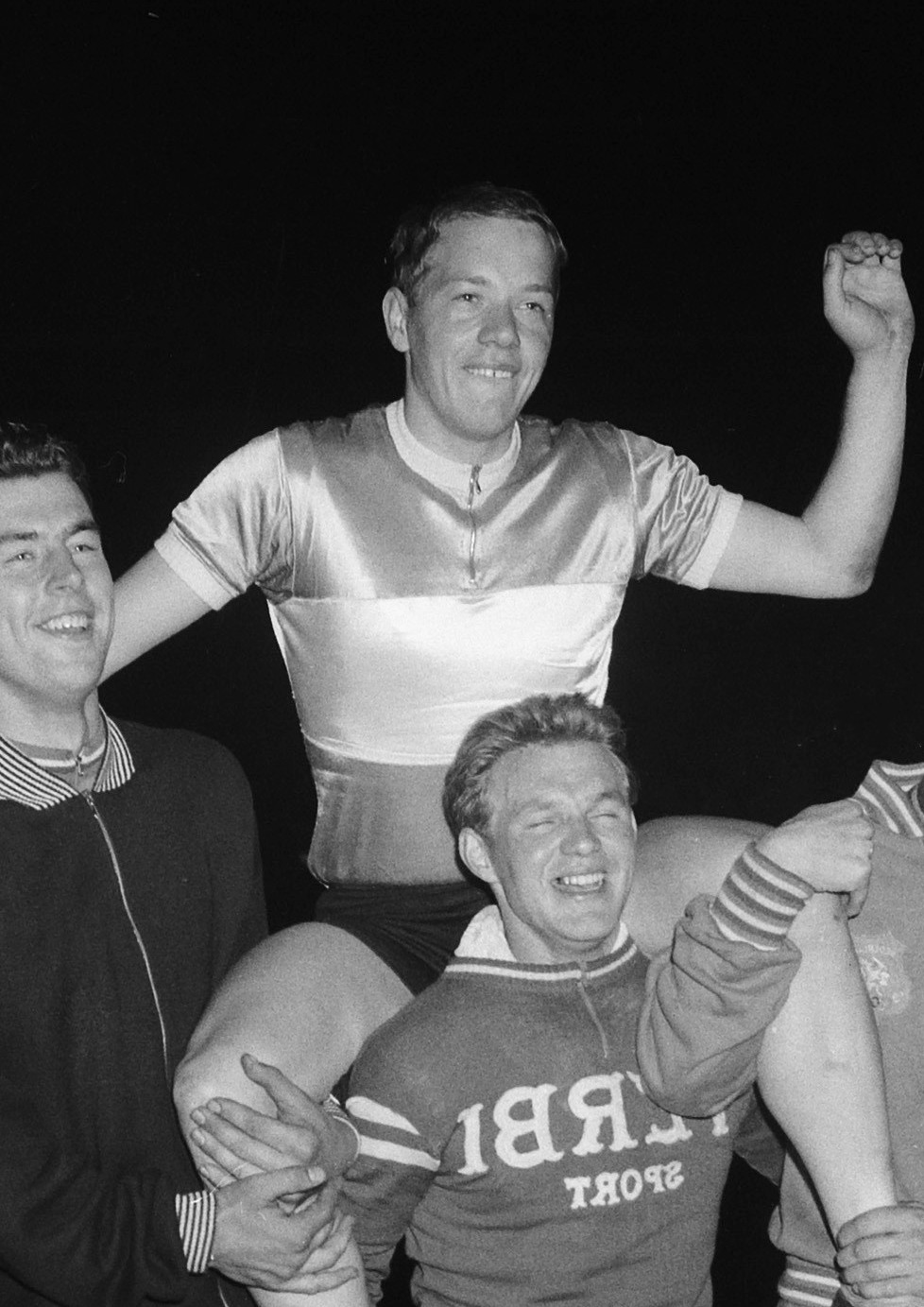
- Aad de Graaf in 1961

Personal information
- Born: 22 October 1939 Rotterdam, Netherlands
- Died: 21 July 1995 (aged 55) Rotterdam, Netherlands
- Height: 1.76 m (5 ft 9 in)
- Weight: 76 kg (168 lb)

Sport
- Sport: Cycling

Arie "Aad" de Graaf (22 October 1939 – 21 July 1995) was a Dutch track cyclist who was active between 1959 and 1966. He won national sprint titles in 1960–1962 and finished second in 1959 and 1963–1965. He competed in the sprint at the 1960 and 1964 Summer Olympics, but failed to reach the finals; in 1964 he finished in fourth place in the 2 km tandem event. In 1964 he won the International Champion of Champions sprint at Herne Hill velodrome.

== See also ==
- List of Dutch Olympic cyclists
