= Giuseppe Ogna =

Italian cyclist (1933–2010)

Personal information
- Born: 5 November 1933 Sant'Eufemia della Fonte, Italy
- Died: 7 May 2010 (aged 76) Milan, Italy

Cycling career
- Sport: Cycling
Medal record
Representing Italy
Olympic Games
Bronze medal – third place	1956 Melbourne	Tandem
World Championships
Gold medal – first place	1955 Milan	Sprint

Giuseppe Ogna (5 November 1933 – 7 May 2010) was an Italian cyclist who won a bronze medal at the 1956 Summer Olympics. In his career, he also won a gold medal at the Track Cycling World Championships.

== Biography ==
He won his Olympic medal in tandem with Cesare Pinarello. In 1959, he appeared on the American television show What's My Line?. He died in 2010 aged 76.
