= David Sharp (cyclist) =

American cyclist

Personal information
- Born: July 16, 1941 (age 85) Indianapolis, Indiana, United States

Cycling career
- Sport: Cycling

David Sharp (born July 16, 1941) is a former American cyclist. He competed in the tandem event at the 1960 Summer Olympics.
