= John Baird (cyclist) =

New Zealand cyclist

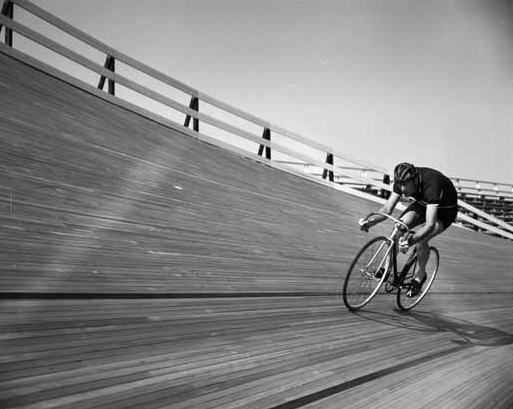
- At the 1954 British Empire and Commonwealth Games; Attribution:Province newspaper

Personal information
- Nationality: New Zealander

Sport
- Sport: Cycling
Medal record
Men's cycling
Representing New Zealand
Commonwealth Games
Silver medal – second place	1954 Vancouver	Road Race

John K. Baird is a former racing cyclist from New Zealand.

He won the silver medal in the men's road race at the 1954 British Empire Games in Vancouver.
