= Amelunxen =

Amelunxen is a surname. Notable people with the surname include:

- Rudolf Amelunxen (1888–1969), German politician of the Zentrum and the 1st Minister President of North Rhine-Westphalia
- Hubertus von Amelunxen (born 1958), German philosopher, art historian, editor, curator, photography critic
