= Boris Vasilyev (cyclist) =

Personal information
- Born: 15 January 1937 Moscow, Russian SFSR, Soviet Union
- Died: 18 June 2000 (aged 63)
- Height: 1.71 m (5 ft 7 in)
- Weight: 68 kg (150 lb)

Sport
- Sport: Cycling
- Club: Burevestnik, Moscow
Medal record
Representing the Soviet Union
Olympic Games
Bronze medal – third place	1960 Rome	Tandem sprint

Boris Alekseyevich Vasilyev (Russian: Борис Алексеевич Васильев; 15 January 1937 – 18 June 2000) was a Russian cyclist. He competed at the 1960 Summer Olympics in the sprint and tandem sprint events and won a bronze medal in the tandem sprint. In 1977, aged 40, he was part of the Soviet team at the Peace Race and finished in second place in the second stage. After retirement he worked as a cycling coach. In particular, he prepared the Soviet track team for the 1980 and 1988 Summer Olympics.
