= Tetsuo Osawa =

Japanese cyclist

Personal information
- Born: 14 June 1936 (age 90) Iwanai, Hokkaido, Japan

Cycling career
- Sport: Cycling

Tetsuo Osawa (大沢 鉄男, Ōsawa Tetsuo; born 14 June 1936) is a former Japanese cyclist. He competed at the 1956 Summer Olympics and the 1960 Summer Olympics.
