= Jean Govaerts =

Belgian cyclist

Personal information
- Born: 1 September 1938 (age 88) Schoten, Belgium

Cycling career
- Sport: Cycling

Jean Govaerts (born 1 September 1938) is a Belgian former cyclist. He competed in the 1000m time trial at the 1960 Summer Olympics.
