= Geoff Smith (cyclist) =

Australian cyclist

Personal information
- Born: 23 September 1942 Australia
- Died: 8 October 2018 (aged 76)

Cycling career
- Sport: Cycling

Geoff Smith (23 September 1942 – 8 October 2018) was an Australian cyclist. He competed in the tandem event at the 1960 Summer Olympics.
