= Josef Helbling =

Swiss cyclist (1935–2024)

Personal information
- Born: 15 July 1935 Jona, St. Gallen, Switzerland
- Died: 11 September 2024 (aged 89)

Cycling career
- Sport: Cycling

Josef Helbling (15 July 1935 – 11 September 2024) was a Swiss cyclist. He competed in the 1000m time trial at the 1960 Summer Olympics.

Helbling died on 11 September 2024, at the age of 89.
