= Syd Byrnes =

South African cyclist

Personal information
- Born: 15 November 1940 (age 85) Cape Town, South Africa

Cycling career
- Sport: Cycling

Syd Byrnes (born 15 November 1940) is a South African former cyclist. He competed in the tandem and team pursuit events at the 1960 Summer Olympics.
