= Norman Sheil =

English cyclist (1932–2018)

Personal information
- Born: 22 October 1932 Liverpool, England
- Died: 25 October 2018 (aged 86) Niagara-On-The-Lake, Ontario, Canada

Cycling career
- Sport: Cycling
- Disciplines: Road and track
- Role: Rider
- Rider type: Endurance

Amateur team
- Melling Wheelers
Medal record
Representing England
UCI World Championships
Gold medal – first place	1955 Milan	Individual pursuit
Gold medal – first place	1958 Paris	Individual pursuit
British Empire and Commonwealth Games
Gold medal – first place	1954 Vancouver	Individual pursuit
Gold medal – first place	1958 Cardiff	Individual pursuit

Norman Leslie Sheil (22 October 1932 – 25 October 2018) was a racing cyclist who won world pursuit championships for Britain in 1955 and 1958 and rode the Tour de France in 1960. He became national coach of the British Cycling Federation and later of the Canadian Cycling Association. He returned to racing in 1998, one month after the birth of his grandson, and won the world points championship for over-65s, in Manchester England.

== Origins ==
Born in Liverpool on 22 October 1932, Norman Sheil started club riding with the Phoenix (Aintree) club in Liverpool in 1948. He said: "I shall never forget those 40 miles, especially the look on my mother's face when she saw me after the run ended. She thought I was deadly ill or something. And I didn't feel so good, as a matter of fact."

He rode his first race at the end of 1948, using a bicycle he had built himself from a frame given to him by an uncle, Bill Cronshaw, a racer in the 1920s. As his love of bike racing continued to get stronger. Fellow L'Pool racers were telling Norman. "If you want to get real good at bike racing then you have to meet Eddie Soens." Eddie met Norman by the front door of the Soens bike shop. "What can I do for you lad ?" Eddie asked. "I've heard. That to become a great bike rider I need to associate myself with you". From there Norman rode a 25-mile [40 km] time-trial in 1h 9m 4s. By 1949 he had improved to 1h 3m 30s, in an event held by the Molyneux club on Merseyside. He moved clubs, from the Phoenix to Walton Paragon, rode a little in 1950 and was then called for national service in February 1951. He spent two years as a naval signalman but without cycling. After his return from service Norman joined the Melling Wheelers.

== Amateur career ==
Sheil was the first British rider to ride a 25-mile time-trial in 55 minutes, using a 48x15 fixed wheel (i.e. 86 inch gear) in 1957. He held national records at 5, 10, 25 miles and 1 hour (26miles 1398yds).

Sheil won the 1954 Empire Games pursuit championship in 5m 3.5sec, beating his England teammate Pete Brotherton by six seconds. His title and then a national record time of 5m 10s later that year in London made selection for the following year's world championship in Milan inevitable. Sheil met the defending champion, Leandro Faggin of Italy, in the semi-final. Sheil won that match and Brotherton won his so that the two Britons met in the final. Sheil won in a British record of 4m 57s.

He represented the England team in the pursuit event at the 1958 British Empire and Commonwealth Games in Cardiff, Wales, winning the gold medal.

== Tour de France ==
Sheil raced on the road in France after winning the pursuit championship for the second time, winning six times. He was one of several British riders such as Stan Brittain, Harry Reynolds and John Kennedy. Two others—Tom Simpson and Brian Robinson—were more established there. The growing number of British riders in France, and the end of a civil war between the National Cyclists Union and the British League of Racing Cyclists, led the Tour de France to invite a team of eight from Britain in 1960. The Tour was still disputed by national rather than trade teams.

Only Robinson and Simpson finished, 26th and 29th. Sheil dropped out after crashing on the 11th stage, when he was in 14th place.

== Coaching ==
Sheil retired from racing soon after the Tour, his last international race taking place in San Sebastian, Spain, in 1963. In 1965 he became national coach in Britain, helping establish the British Cycle Coaching Scheme and the English (now British) Schools Cycling Association. He held the job until 1972. He was Canadian national coach from 1978 to 1982, then a track coach in the US in 1989. He died at his home in Niagara-On-The-Lake, Ontario on 25 October 2018, following complications of both leukaemia and vascular dementia, leaving behind his wife Rachel, his son, Martin and his family, including his grandchildren, Benjamin, Harry and Jessica.

== Golden Book of Cycling ==
He has an entry in The Golden Book of Cycling.
