= Ian Chapman (cyclist) =

Australian cyclist (born 1939)

Personal information
- Full name: Ian Roy Chapman
- Born: 21 December 1939 (age 86) Bendigo, Australia

Cycling career
- Sport: Cycling
Medal record
Track cycling
Representing Australia
British Empire and Commonwealth Games
Silver medal – second place	1962 Perth	Men's Time Trial

Ian Roy Chapman (born 21 December 1939) is an Australian former cyclist. He competed in the 1000m time trial at the 1960 Summer Olympics.
