= Dave Sharp (bass guitarist) =

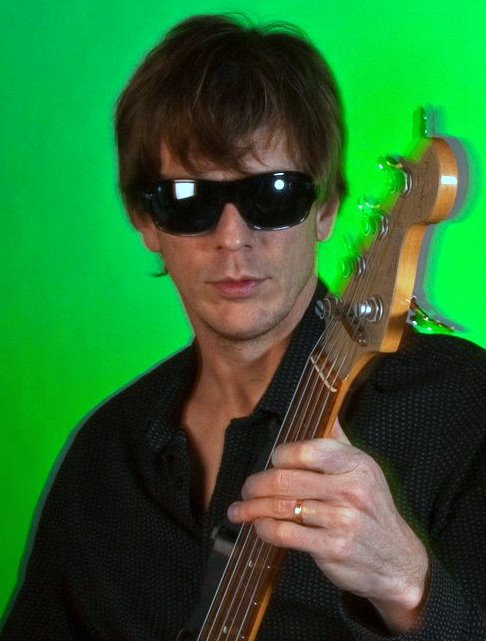
- Dave Sharp

Background information
- Also known as: D3
- Born: David Sharp
- Genres: Jazz, world music, Klezmer
- Occupations: Musician, songwriter
- Instruments: Bass guitar, double bass
- Labels: Vortex Jazz Recordings, Musart, Blue Pie Records
- Website: davesharp.com

Dave Sharp is a musician, best known as the touring bass guitarist for the rock band Melvins during their 1993 tour. He currently plays in several bands including Dave Sharp Worlds Quartet (World Jazz), Dave Sharp Worlds Trio, Klezmephonic (Traditional Klezmer) as well as collaborating with Bollywood musicians (Parthiv Gohil, Jointa Gandhi).

Native Detroiter Sharp became devoted to Jazz at the University of Michigan and later studied with bassist Herbie Lewis in San Francisco, and bassist, composer and bandleader Marion Hayden in Michigan.

In 2011, Sharp played upright bass with Iggy Pop & The Stooges, in a tribute concert to Ron Asheton.

Sharp currently lives in Ann Arbor, Michigan where he composes, records, teaches and performs.

== Discography ==
- 2017 – "DELTA" Featuring Henrik Karapetyan, Mike List, Igor and Dave Sharp
- 2013 – WORLDS Featuring Chris Kaercher, Elden Kelly, Cheik Lo, Parthiv Gohil, Gayelynne McKinney, Gary Schunk, Andre Frappier, Evan Perri, Chris Codish, Igor Houwat, Chuck Mauk, Jay Antani, Pathe Jasse, Eenor, Carolyn Koebel.
- 2010 – 7
- 2011 – JUNGLE (self-titled) (with Muruga Booker and Steven Springer)
- 1991 - Touch the Monkey (With Mol Triffid)
