= Cyril Peacock =

British cyclist (1929–1992)

Personal information
- Born: 19 September 1929 Fulham, London, England
- Died: 31 December 1992 (aged 63)

Cycling career
- Sport: Cycling
- Discipline: Track
- Role: Rider
- Rider type: Sprinter

Amateur team
- Tooting BC
Medal record
Cycling
Representing England
British Empire & Commonwealth Games
| Gold medal – first place | 1954 Vancouver | 1000m Match Sprint |

Cyril Francis Peacock (19 July 1929 – 31 December 1992) was a British amateur racing cyclist who was world champion in 1954. He was also national sprint champion in 1952, 1953 and 1954 and was the Commonwealth Games champion in 1954.

== Biography ==
=== Adolescence ===
Cyril Peacock took up cycle-racing when he was 15 and working as a scientific surgical instrument maker. in south London. He met a friend, Charlie Whitbourn, who suggested he join the Kingston Road Club. He was a member for two years before he rode his first race.

His first track, or velodrome, race was at Slough, west of London, on 22 June 1947. He came third. That September he won his first race, the National Cyclists' Union junior medal competition at Paddington, central London.

He joined the army for compulsory national service at the end of the year and spent two years as a physical training instructor but did not ride a bike. Until then he had raced on the track on a road bike stripped of brakes and gears. He bought his first true track machine from money saved while with the Army.

=== Early career ===
Peacock rejoined Kingston Road Club and rode the 1951 national sprint championship, where he was beaten in the quarterfinal by Lloyd Binch of Nottingham. The news magazine The Bicycle wrote: "The last meeting of 1951, the NCU Meeting of Champions, provided a first-class sensation. In the Robbialac Bowl sprint, he was in a disputed finish with Jan Hijselendoorn of Holland, who almost fell on Peacock as they reached the line. Peacock lost the decision - but he gained a lot of admiration."

In 1952, by then a member of the Tooting Bicycle Club in south London and on 5 July won the British sprint championship, at Herne Hill velodrome. That brought selection for Britain in the Olympic Games in Helsinki; he came fourth of 27 behind Enzo Sacchi of Italy, Lionel Cox of Australia and Werner Putzenheim of Germany. In 1953 he won the £1,000 International Champion of Champions sprint, again at Herne Hill velodrome, on Good Friday 1953; he was the first Englishman to win it He also beat the French champion, André Beyney, in France.

Peacock won the national championship again in 1953 and 1954, the Robbialac Bowl in 1952, 1953 and 1954, and the Champion of Champions sprint again in 1953.

In 1954 he won the world championship in Cologne, Germany, beating John Tressider of Australia and Roger Gaignard of France. Another Briton, Reg Harris, won the professional championship. They were the last British winners before Chris Hoy in 2008. Peacock and Harris featured on Player's cigarette cards in 1957.

He represented England and won a gold medal in the Track 1000m Match Sprint at the 1954 British Empire and Commonwealth Games in Vancouver, Canada.

=== Professional ===
Peacock became a professional for Raleigh in January 1955 . In March he was awarded the Bidlake Memorial Plaque for service to cycling .
