= Václav Machek (cyclist) =

Czech cyclist

Personal information
- Born: 27 December 1925 Starý Mateřov, Czechoslovakia
- Died: 1 November 2017 (aged 91)

Cycling career
- Sport: Cycling
Medal record
Men's cycling
Representing Czechoslovakia
Olympic Games
Silver medal – second place	1956 Melbourne	Tandem

Václav Machek (27 December 1925 – 1 November 2017) was a Czech cyclist who competed for Czechoslovakia. He took part in the 1956 Summer Olympics, winning a silver medal in the tandem event.
