= Mario Vanegas =

Colombian cyclist

Personal information
- Born: 22 July 1939 (age 87) Amagá, Colombia

Cycling career
- Sport: Cycling

Mario Vanegas (born 22 July 1939) is a former Colombian cyclist. He competed at the 1960, 1964 and 1968 Summer Olympics.
