= Peter Brotherton =

British cyclist

Personal information
- Born: 4 February 1931 (age 95) Boston, Lincolnshire, England

Cycling career
- Sport: Cycling
- Rider type: Track cyclist

Amateur team
- East Midlands Clarion
Medal record
Cycling
Representing England
British Empire & Commonwealth Games
Silver medal – second place	1954 Vancouver	4,000m pursuit

Peter Brotherton (born 4 February 1931) in Boston, Lincolnshire, is a former British racing cyclist. He participated at the Olympic Games and competed in UK cycling time trials, road races and track cycling events.

== Biography ==
Brotherton represented the English team at the 1954 British Empire and Commonwealth Games held in Vancouver, Canada, where he won the silver medal in the Individual pursuit race.

He also represented Great Britain at the World Championships and

After competing at the 1956 Olympic Games held in Melbourne, Australia, along with his wife, they both decided to emigrate, and settled in Melbourne. He continued to compete, in track cycling carnival events, and in 1957, he won the Bendigo Golden Mile wheelrace, beating Russell Mockridge into second place. The following season (1958) he teamed up with Sid Patterson to win the Sydney 6 Day track cycling event. A change of partner (Don Burgess) and the Melbourne Milk 6 Day ended in a 3rd place finish. After retiring from cycle racing, Brotherton began building road and track cycle frames, using the brand name "Petrus".

== Cycling results ==
Date	Event	Location	Details	Result	Winner
May 1953	Manchester Grand Prix	Fallowfield	1000m Sprint	3rd	Cyril Peacock (GBR)
June 1953	Brighton Grand Prix	Brighton, Sussex	1000m Sprint	1st	Peter Brotherton (GBR)
July 1953	British Championships	Unknown venue	4000m Individual Pursuit	2nd	Ken Mitchell (GBR)
July 1953	British Championships	Unknown venue	2000m Tandem Sprint	1st	Peter Brotherton (GBR)
June 1956	Muratti Gold Cup	Fallowfield	10.00 miles Scratch Race	3rd	Clive Middleton (GBR)
March 1957	Bendigo Golden Mile Wheelrace	Bendigo	1.00 mile	1st	Peter Brotherton (GBR)
Oct 2-8th 1958	Sydney 6-Day with Sid Patterson	Sydney, NSW	6 Days	1st	Peter Brotherton (GBR)
November 1959	Melbourne 6-Day with Don Burgess	Essendon	6 Days	3rd	Reynolds-Patterson (AUS)
