= Clyde Rimple =

Trinidadian and British cyclist (1937–2022)

Personal information
- Full name: Raymond Clyde Rimple
- Born: 16 June 1937 Marabella, Trinidad and Tobago
- Died: 2 April 2022 (aged 84) Newbury, Berkshire, England

Cycling career
- Sport: Cycling

Raymond Clyde Rimple (16 June 1937 – 2 April 2022) was a Trinidadian and British cyclist and politician. He competed at the 1958 British Empire and Commonwealth Games, staying in the United Kingdom after the competition. Rimple joined the Royal Air Force and was selected for the British West Indies at the 1960 Summer Olympics. After his cycling career, he lived in both Trinidad and England. He served as a Bracknell town councillor from 1974 to 1978.

== Biography ==
Raymond Clyde Rimple was born on 16 June 1937 in Marabella, Trinidad and Tobago, to a family of four brothers and three sisters. Rimple worked as an instrument fitter at an oilfield and owned a bicycle shop in Trinidad and Tobago. He was persuaded by his friends to take up cycling as a sport.

Rimple was selected to compete for Trinidad and Tobago at the 1958 British Empire and Commonwealth Games held in Cardiff, Wales, competing in every cycling event besides the individual pursuit. Instead of leaving the country after the Games, Rimple decided to stay in London and was employed as a sheet metal worker for 18 months. He also continued to cycle, winning multiple club championships. In 1959, he enrolled at college and joined the Royal Air Force (RAF), being stationed in Locking. His camp's sports officer knew about Rimple's success in cycling and contacted the Trinidad and Tobago Cycling Federation, to where he was selected to compete for the British West Indies at the 1960 Summer Olympics. Earlier that year, he won the five-mile scratch race in the RAF track championships over Karl Barton. At the 1960 Summer Games, he competed in both road and track cycling but did not medal in either event. He was featured on the cover of the magazine Sporting Cyclist in 1961.

After his cycling career, he moved back to Trinidad and Tobago to work in the oil industry, but moved back to England later in his life. From 1974 to 1976, he served as a town councillor for Bracknell and resided in Great Hollands with his wife and four children. The following year, he received a one-year conditional discharge and was fined 60 pounds after pouring bleach and urinating on his wife's clothes.

Rimple died on 2 April 2022 in Newbury, Berkshire, England, at the age of 84.
