= Les Haupt =

South African cyclist

Personal information
- Born: 29 March 1939 (age 87) Cape Town, South Africa

Cycling career
- Sport: Cycling

Les Haupt (born 29 March 1939) is a South African former cyclist. He competed in the 1000m time trial and tandem events at the 1960 Summer Olympics.
