= Ladislav Fouček =

Czechoslovak cyclist

Personal information
- Born: 10 December 1930 Prague, Czechoslovakia
- Died: 4 July 1974 (aged 43) Munich, West Germany

Cycling career
- Sport: Cycling
Medal record
Men's cycling
Representing Czechoslovakia
Olympic Games
Silver medal – second place	1956 Melbourne	Time trial
Silver medal – second place	1956 Melbourne	Tandem

Ladislav Fouček (10 December 1930 – 4 July 1974) was a Czechoslovak cyclist. He won silver medals in Men's 1,000 metres Time Trial and Men's Tandem Sprint, 2000 metres at the 1956 Summer Olympics.
