= Cesare Pinarello =

Italian cyclist (1932–2012)

Personal information
- Born: 5 October 1932 Treviso, Italy
- Died: 2 August 2012 (aged 79) Treviso, Italy

Cycling career
- Sport: Cycling
Medal record
Men's cycling
Representing Italy
Olympic Games
Bronze medal – third place	1952 Helsinki	Tandem
Bronze medal – third place	1956 Melbourne	Tandem
Track Cycling World Championships
Silver medal – second place	1953 Zürich	Sprint
Bronze medal – third place	1955 Milah	Sprint

Cesare Pinarello (5 October 1932 – 2 August 2012) was an Italian cyclist who won two bronze medals at the Summer Olympics (1952 and 1956).

== Biography ==
He died in Treviso on 2 August 2012 aged 79.
