= Vladimir Leonov (cyclist) =

Soviet cyclist

Personal information
- Born: 25 April 1937 (age 89) Tula, Russian SFSR, Soviet Union
- Height: 1.70 m (5 ft 7 in)
- Weight: 67 kg (148 lb)

Sport
- Sport: Cycling
- Club: Trud, Tula
Medal record
Representing the Soviet Union
Olympic Games
| Bronze medal – third place | 1960 Rome | Tandem sprint |

Vladimir Petrovich Leonov (Russian: Владимир Петрович Леонов; born 25 April 1937) is a retired cyclist from Russia. He competed in the 2000 m tandem sprint at the 1956 and 1960 Summer Olympics and finished in ninth and third places, respectively. During his career he won three national titles: in the sprint (1958, 1959) and tandem sprint (1961).
