= Rowing at the 1960 Summer Olympics =

Rowing at the Games of the XVII Olympiad
- Venue: Lake Albano
- Dates: 30 August – 3 September 1960
- Competitors: 410 from 33 nations

Rowing at the 1960 Summer Olympics featured 7 events, for men only. The competitions were held from 30 August to 3 September on the Lago di Albano.

== Medal summary ==
=== Men's events ===
Games	Gold	Silver	Bronze
single sculls	Vyacheslav Ivanov; Soviet Union	Achim Hill; United Team of Germany	Teodor Kocerka; Poland
double sculls	Václav Kozák and Pavel Schmidt; Czechoslovakia	Aleksandr Berkutov and Yuriy Tyukalov; Soviet Union	Ernst Hürlimann and Rolf Larcher; Switzerland
coxless pairs	Valentin Boreyko and Oleg Golovanov; Soviet Union	Josef Kloimstein and Alfred Sageder; Austria	Veli Lehtelä and Toimi Pitkänen; Finland
coxed pairs	United Team of Germany; Bernhard Knubel; Heinz Renneberg; Klaus Zerta	Soviet Union; Antanas Bagdonavičius; Zigmas Jukna; Igor Rudakov	United States; Richard Draeger; Conn Findlay; Kent Mitchell
coxless fours	United States; Arthur Ayrault; Ted Nash; John Sayre; Rusty Wailes	Italy; Tullio Baraglia; Renato Bosatta; Giancarlo Crosta; Giuseppe Galante	Soviet Union; Igor Akhremchik; Yuriy Bachurov; Valentin Morkovkin; Anatoly Tarabrin
coxed fours	United Team of Germany; Gerd Cintl; Horst Effertz; Klaus Riekemann; Jürgen Litz; Michael Obst	France; Robert Dumontois; Claude Martin; Jacques Morel; Guy Nosbaum; Jean Klein	Italy; Fulvio Balatti; Romano Sgheiz; Franco Trincavelli; Giovanni Zucchi; Ivo Stefanoni
eights	United Team of Germany; Manfred Rulffs; Walter Schröder; Frank Schepke; Kraft Schepke; Karl-Heinrich von Groddeck; Karl-Heinz Hopp; Klaus Bittner; Hans Lenk; Willi Padge	Canada; Donald Arnold; Walter D'Hondt; Nelson Kuhn; John Lecky; David Anderson; Archibald MacKinnon; Bill McKerlich; Glen Mervyn; Sohen Biln	Czechoslovakia; Bohumil Janoušek; Jan Jindra; Jiří Lundák; Stanislav Lusk; Václav Pavkovič; Luděk Pojezný; Jan Švéda; Josef Věntus; Miroslav Koníček

== Participating nations ==
A total of 410 rowers from 33 nations competed at the Rome Games:

- Argentina (9)
- Australia (25)
- Austria (10)
- Belgium (5)
- Brazil (5)
- Canada (15)
- Czechoslovakia (22)
- Denmark (16)
- Finland (12)
- France (16)
- United Team of Germany (26)
- Great Britain (26)
- Greece (6)
- Hungary (9)
- Italy (26)
- Japan (14)
- Mexico (2)
- Netherlands (13)
- New Zealand (1)
- Norway (2)
- Peru (2)
- Poland (5)
- Portugal (5)
- Romania (8)
- South Africa (5)
- Soviet Union (25)
- Spain (18)
- Sweden (12)
- Switzerland (18)
- United Arab Republic (9)
- United States (26)
- Uruguay (5)
- Yugoslavia (12)

== Medal table ==
Rank	Nation	Gold	Silver	Bronze	Total
1	United Team of Germany	3	1	0	4
2	Soviet Union	2	2	1	5
3	Czechoslovakia	1	0	1	2
3	United States	1	0	1	2
5	Italy	0	1	1	2
6	Austria	0	1	0	1
6	Canada	0	1	0	1
6	France	0	1	0	1
9	Finland	0	0	1	1
9	Poland	0	0	1	1
9	Switzerland	0	0	1	1
Totals (11 entries)		7	7	7	21

== Notes ==
- Conflicting sources: Some sources list Lorne Loomer as a silver medalist in eights at the 1960 Summer Olympics in Rome, as a member of the Canadian team. However, according to other sources Loomer competed in the coxless pair, but was replaced by substitute David Anderson in the eight.
