= Canada at the 1960 Summer Olympics =

- IOC code: CAN
- NOC: Canadian Olympic Committee

in Rome
- Competitors: 85 in 14 sports
- Flag bearer: Carl Schwende
- Medals Ranked 32nd: Gold 0 Silver 1 Bronze 0 Total 1

Summer Olympics appearances (overview)
- 1900; 1904; 1908; 1912; 1920; 1924; 1928; 1932; 1936; 1948; 1952; 1956; 1960; 1964; 1968; 1972; 1976; 1980; 1984; 1988; 1992; 1996; 2000; 2004; 2008; 2012; 2016; 2020; 2024

Other related appearances
- 1906 Intercalated Games

Canada competed at the 1960 Summer Olympics in Rome, Italy. 85 competitors, 74 men and 11 women, took part in 77 events in 14 sports.

== Medallists ==
=== Silver ===
- Donald Arnold, Walter D'Hondt, Nelson Kuhn, John Lecky, Kenneth Loomer, Bill McKerlich, Archibald MacKinnon, Glenn Mervyn, and Sohen Biln – Rowing, men's eight with coxswain

== Athletics ==
Key

- Note–Ranks given for track events are within the athlete's heat only
- Q = Qualified for the next round

Men
Track & road events

Athlete	Event	Heat		Quarterfinal		Semifinal		Final	
Athlete	Event	Result	Rank	Result	Rank	Result	Rank	Result	Rank
Lynn Eves	100 m	10.8	4	Did not advance					
Harry Jerome	100 m	10.5	1 Q	10.4	1 Q	DNF		Did not advance	
George Short	100 m	10.9	4	Did not advance					
Harry Jerome	200 m	DNS		Did not advance					
Lynn Eves	200 m	21.9	4	Did not advance					
Terry Tobacco	400 m	47.5	4	—N/a				Did not advance	
Ergas Leps	800 m	1:50.93	2 Q	1:52.13	6	Did not advance			
Joe Mullins	800 m	1:51.46	4	Did not advance					
Sig Ohlemann	800 m	2:07.40	4	Did not advance					
Joe Mullins	1500 m	—N/a				3:53.45	10	Did not advance	
Doug Kyle	5000 m	14:25.36	7	—N/a				Did not advance	
Doug Kyle	10,000 m	—N/a						30:27.20	24
George Shepherd	400 m hurdles	53.0	4	—N/a		Did not advance			
Lynn Eves; George Short; Terry Tobacco; Harry Jerome; Sig Ohlemann	4 × 100 m relay	42.27	2	—N/a		41.27	4	Did not advance	
Ergas Leps; Joe Mullins; Sig Ohlemann; Terry Tobacco	4 × 400 m relay	3:10.65	2	—N/a		3:08.37	5	Did not advance	
Gordon Dickson	Marathon	—N/a						2:38:46.0	55
Alex Oakley	20 km walk	—N/a						1:38:46.0	9
Alex Oakley	50 km walk	—N/a						4:33:08.6	6

Combined events – Decathlon

Athlete	Event	100 m	LJ	SP	HJ	400 m	110H	DT	PV	JT	1500 m	Final	Rank
George Stulac	Result	12.0	5.92	13.32	1.70	53.0	18.4	37.35	3.60	50.40	4:59.6	5198	22
George Stulac	Points	597	493	648	656	642	250	555	556	536	265	5198	22

Women
Track & road events

Athlete	Event	Heat		Quarterfinal		Semifinal		Final	
Athlete	Event	Result	Rank	Result	Rank	Result	Rank	Result	Rank
Eleanor Haslam	100 m	12.21	3 Q	12.46	5	Did not advance			
Nancy Lewington	100 m	12.67	4 Q	13.23	7	Did not advance			
Valerie Jerome	100 m	12.58	4 Q	12.50	5	Did not advance			
Eleanor Haslam	200 m	24.63	3	—N/a		Did not advance			
Eleanor Haslam	800 m	2:10.17	4	—N/a				Did not advance	
Sally McCallum	80 m hurdles	11.90	4	—N/a		Did not advance			
Nancy Lewington; Sally McCallum; Valerie Jerome; Eleanor Haslam	4 × 100 m relay	48.05	5	—N/a				Did not advance	

Field events

Athlete	Event	Qualification		Final	
Athlete	Event	Result	Rank	Result	Rank
Sally McCallum	Long jump	5.22	27	Did not advance	

== Cycling ==
Two cyclists represented Canada in 1960.

Individual road race

- Luigi Bartesaghi
- Alessandro Messina

== Diving ==
Men

Athlete	Event	Preliminary		Semi-final				Final			
Athlete	Event	Points	Rank	Points	Rank	Total	Rank	Points	Rank	Total	Rank
Ernie Meissner	3 m springboard	53.62	8 Q	40.61	6	94.23	7 Q	49.84	5	144.07	5
Ernie Meissner	10 m platform	45.71	22	Did not advance							

Women

Athlete	Event	Preliminary		Semi-final				Final			
Athlete	Event	Points	Rank	Points	Rank	Total	Rank	Points	Rank	Total	Rank
Irene MacDonald	3 m springboard	50.42	9 Q	40.81	2	91.23	3 Q	43.46	6	134.69	6
Irene MacDonald	10 m platform	51.31	9 Q	—N/a				29.18	8	80.49	9

== Fencing ==
One fencer represented Canada in 1960.

Men's foil

- Carl Schwende

== Rowing ==
Canada had 15 male rowers participate in three out of seven rowing events in 1960.

Men's coxless pair

- Lorne Loomer
- Keith Donald

Men's coxless four

- Robert Adams
- Clayton Brown
- Chris Leach
- Franklin Zielski

Men's eight

- Donald Arnold
- Walter D'Hondt
- Nelson Kuhn
- John Lecky
- David Anderson
- Archibald MacKinnon
- Bill McKerlich
- Glen Mervyn
- Sohen Biln

== Shooting ==
Seven shooters represented Canada in 1960.

25 m pistol

- Garfield McMahon
- Godfrey Brunner

50 m pistol

- Garfield McMahon
- Godfrey Brunner

300 m rifle, three positions

- Edson Warner
- Evald Gering

50 m rifle, three positions

- Evald Gering
- Gil Boa

50 m rifle, prone

- Gil Boa
- Edson Warner

Trap

- Gilbert Henderson
- William Jones

== Swimming ==
Men

Athlete	Event	Heat		Semifinal		Final	
Athlete	Event	Time	Rank	Time	Rank	Time	Rank
Cam Grout	100 m freestyle	57.6	=16 Q	58.0	=18	Did not advance	
Dick Pound	100 m freestyle	56.7	9 Q	56.5	=7 Q	56.3	6
Bob Wheaton	100 m backstroke	1:05.7	17	Did not advance			
Steve Rabinovitch	200 m breaststroke	2:47.2	25	Did not advance			
Cam Grout	200 m butterfly	2:27.7	21	Did not advance			
Bob Wheaton; Steve Rabinovitch; Cam Grout; Dick Pound	4 × 100 m medley	4:15.3	3 Q	—N/a		4:16.8	4

Women

Athlete	Event	Heat		Semifinal		Final	
Athlete	Event	Time	Rank	Time	Rank	Time	Rank
Margaret Iwasaki	100 m freestyle	1:07.6	24	Did not advance			
Mary Beth Stewart	100 m freestyle	1:06.0	14 Q	1:04.2	=7 Q	1:05.5	8
Sara Barber	100 m backstroke	1:13.4	13	—N/a		Did not advance	
Judith McHale	200 m breaststroke	3:07.7	24	—N/a		Did not advance	
Margaret Iwasaki	100 m butterfly	1:14.2	=11	—N/a		Did not advance	
Judith McHale	100 m butterfly	DNS		—N/a		Did not advance	
Sara Barber; Judith McHale; Margaret Iwasaki; Mary Beth Stewart	4 × 100 m medley	4:59.5	9	—N/a		Did not advance	
