= Rowing at the 1960 Summer Olympics – Men's eight =

Men's eight at the Games of the XVII Olympiad
- Rowing pictogram
- Venue: Lake Albano
- Dates: 31 August – 3 September 1960
- Competitors: 126 from 14 nations

Medalists
1st place, gold medalist(s)		United Team of Germany: Manfred Rulffs; Walter Schröder; Frank Schepke; Kraft Schepke; Karl-Heinrich von Groddeck; Karl-Heinz Hopp; Klaus Bittner; Hans Lenk; Willi Padge
2nd place, silver medalist(s)		Canada: Donald Arnold; Walter D'Hondt; Nelson Kuhn; John Lecky; David Anderson; Archibald MacKinnon; Bill McKerlich; Glen Mervyn; Sohen Biln
3rd place, bronze medalist(s)		Czechoslovakia: Bohumil Janoušek; Jan Jindra; Jiří Lundák; Stanislav Lusk; Václav Pavkovič; Luděk Pojezný; Jan Švéda; Josef Věntus; Miroslav Koníček

The men's eight competition at the 1960 Summer Olympics took place at took place at Lake Albano, Italy. It was held from 31 August to 3 September. There were 14 boats (126 competitors) from 14 nations, with each nation limited to a single boat in the event. The event was won by the United Team of Germany in that combined team's debut; it was the first medal for any German team since the 1936 Games in Berlin and first-ever gold medal in the event for a German team. Canada repeated as silver medalists. Czechoslovakia won its first men's eight medal with a bronze. The United States, which had won the last eight times the event was held (from 1920 to 1956) and all ten times the nation had appeared before, lost for the first time—finishing fifth, off the podium entirely, despite being among the contenders once again.

== Background ==
This was the 13th appearance of the event. Rowing had been on the programme in 1896 but was cancelled due to bad weather. The men's eight has been held every time that rowing has been contested, beginning in 1900.

The United States was the dominant nation in the event, with the nation winning the previous eight Olympic men's eight competitions (as well as the other two competitions which the United States had entered). Potential challengers included the United Team of Germany (West Germany had won the 1959 European Rowing Championships), Italy (1957 and 1958 European Rowing Championships winners), and Canada (1958 British Empire and Commonwealth champions and 1959 Pan American Games runners-up). The American team was represented by a crew from the United States Navy. The German side was a combined team from the Ratzeburg and Ditmarsia Kiel clubs; they were competing with a new oar design.

The United Arab Republic made its debut in the event; East and West Germany competed together as the United Team of Germany for the first time. Canada, Great Britain, and the United States each made their 11th appearance, tied for most among nations to that point.

== Competition format ==
The "eight" event featured nine-person boats, with eight rowers and a coxswain. It was a sweep rowing event, with the rowers each having one oar (and thus each rowing on one side). This rowing competition consisted of two main rounds (semifinals and final), as well as a repechage round that allowed teams that did not win their heats to advance to the final. The course used the 2000 metres distance that became the Olympic standard in 1912 (with the exception of 1948).

- Semifinals: Three heats. With 15 boats entered, there were five boats per heat (except in the first heat, where one team did not appear). The winner of each heat advanced directly to the final; all other boats went to the repechage.
- Repechage: Three heats. With 11 boats racing in but not winning their initial heats, there were three or four boats per repechage heat. The top boat in each repechage heat advanced to the final, with the remaining boats eliminated.
- Final: The final consisted of the six boats that had won either the semifinal heats or the repechage heats.

== Schedule ==
All times are Central European Time (UTC+1)

Date	Time	Round
Wednesday, 31 August 1960	16:00	Semifinals
Friday, 2 September 1960		Repechage
Saturday, 3 September 1960	18:00	Final

== Results ==
=== Semifinals ===
==== Semifinal 1 ====
Poland was scheduled to participate in this heat but did not appear.

Rank	Rowers	Coxswain	Nation	Time	Notes
1	Bohumil Janoušek; Jan Jindra; Jiří Lundák; Stanislav Lusk; Václav Pavkovič; Luděk Pojezný; Jan Švéda; Josef Věntus	Miroslav Koníček	Czechoslovakia	6:13.08	Q
2	Alexander Cunningham; Berry Durston; Milton Francis; Maxwell Gamble; Geoffrey Hale; John Ledder; Roger Ninham; John Rosser	Terrence Scook	Australia	6:16.94	R
3	Abdel Sattar Abdel Hadj; Mohamed Abdel Sami; Abdel Fattah Abou-Shanab; Abdallah Gazi; Taha Hassouba; Saleh Ibrahim; Ibrahim Abdulhalim; Abdel Mohsen Saad	Abbas Khamis	United Arab Republic	6:22.06	R
4	Rune Andersson; Bengt-Åke Bengtsson; Åke Berntsson; Lars-Eric Gustafsson; Ulf Gustafsson; Kjell Hansson; Per Hedenberg; Ralph Hurtig	Sture Baatz	Sweden	6:29.49	R

==== Semifinal 2 ====
Rank	Rowers	Coxswain	Nation	Time	Notes
1	Klaus Bittner; Karl-Heinrich von Groddeck; Karl-Heinz Hopp; Hans Lenk; Manfred Rulffs; Frank Schepke; Kraft Schepke; Walter Schröder	Willi Padge	United Team of Germany	6:03.34	Q
2	Jean-Louis Bellet; Émile Clerc; Jean Ledoux; Gaston Mercier; Bernard Meynadier; Joseph Moroni; Christian Puibaraud; Michel Viaud	Alain Bouffard	France	6:07.71	R
3	Richard Bate; John Chester; Graham Cooper; Michael Davis; Ian Elliott; Richard Fishlock; Alexander Lindsay; Donald Shaw	Peter Reynolds	Great Britain	6:10.33	R
4	Kenro Chiba; Tetsuzo Hirose; Hironori Itsuki; Hiroshi Saito; Tadashi Saito; Tetsuo Sato; Shigemi Tamura; Yosuke Tazaki	Hiroyuki Misawa	Japan	6:11.86	R
5	Rico Bianchi; Émile Ess; Hugo Goeggel; Hans Graber; Werner Kölliker; Walter Osterwalder; Gottfried Schär; Hansruedi Scheller	Werner Ehrensperger	Switzerland	6:17.00	R

==== Semifinal 3 ====
Rank	Rowers	Coxswain	Nation	Time	Notes
1	David Anderson; Donald Arnold; Walter D'Hondt; Nelson Kuhn; John Lecky; Archibald MacKinnon; Bill McKerlich; Glen Mervyn	Sohen Biln	Canada	6:03.18	Q
2	Joe Baldwin; Peter Bos; Mark Moore; Lyman S. Perry; Skip Sweetser; Gayle Thompson; Robert Wilson; Howard Winfree	William Long	United States	6:07.69	R
3	Paolo Amorini; Vasco Cantarello; Gian Carlo Casalini; Luigi Prato; Vincenzo Prina; Nazzareno Simonato; Luigi Spozio; Armido Torri	Giuseppe Pira	Italy	6:09.05	R
4	Mikhail Balenkov; Viktor Barinov; Viktor Bogachev; Voldemar Dundur; Nikolay Gomolko; Boris Gorokhov; Leonid Ivanov; Vladimir Malik	Yuriy Lorentsson	Soviet Union	6:09.65	R
5	Ignacio Alcorta; José Almandoz; José Aristegui; Santiago Beitia; José Ibarburu; Manuel Ibarburu; José Leiceaga; Trimido Vaqueriza	Faustino Amiano	Spain	6:31.43	R

=== Repechage ===
==== Repechage heat 1 ====
Rank	Rowers	Coxswain	Nation	Time	Notes
1	Paolo Amorini; Vasco Cantarello; Gian Carlo Casalini; Luigi Prato; Vincenzo Prina; Nazzareno Simonato; Luigi Spozio; Armido Torri	Giuseppe Pira	Italy	6:23.83	Q
2	Kenro Chiba; Tetsuzo Hirose; Hironori Itsuki; Hiroshi Saito; Tadashi Saito; Tetsuo Sato; Shigemi Tamura; Yosuke Tazaki	Hiroyuki Misawa	Japan	6:24.41	
3	Rico Bianchi; Émile Ess; Hugo Goeggel; Hans Graber; Werner Kölliker; Walter Osterwalder; Gottfried Schär; Hansruedi Scheller	Werner Ehrensperger	Switzerland	6:30.26	
4	Alexander Cunningham; Berry Durston; Milton Francis; Maxwell Gamble; Geoffrey Hale; John Ledder; Roger Ninham; John Rosser	Terrence Scook	Australia	6:31.15	

==== Repechage heat 2 ====
Rank	Rowers	Coxswain	Nation	Time	Notes
1	Jean-Louis Bellet; Émile Clerc; Jean Ledoux; Gaston Mercier; Bernard Meynadier; Joseph Moroni; Christian Puibaraud; Michel Viaud	Alain Bouffard	France	6:21.34	Q
2	Mikhail Balenkov; Viktor Barinov; Viktor Bogachev; Voldemar Dundur; Nikolay Gomolko; Boris Gorokhov; Leonid Ivanov; Vladimir Malik	Yuriy Lorentsson	Soviet Union	6:21.88	
3	Abdel Sattar Abdel Hadj; Mohamed Abdel Sami; Abdel Fattah Abou-Shanab; Abdallah Gazi; Taha Hassouba; Saleh Ibrahim; Ibrahim Abdulhalim; Abdel Mohsen Saad	Abbas Khamis	United Arab Republic	6:41.26	
4	Ignacio Alcorta; José Almandoz; José Aristegui; Santiago Beitia; José Ibarburu; Manuel Ibarburu; José Leiceaga; Trimido Vaqueriza	Faustino Amiano	Spain	6:52.46	

==== Repechage heat 3 ====
Rank	Rowers	Coxswain	Nation	Time	Notes
1	Joe Baldwin; Peter Bos; Mark Moore; Lyman S. Perry; Skip Sweetser; Gayle Thompson; Robert Wilson; Howard Winfree	William Long	United States	6:31.77	Q
2	Richard Bate; John Chester; Graham Cooper; Michael Davis; Ian Elliott; Richard Fishlock; Alexander Lindsay; Donald Shaw	Peter Reynolds	Great Britain	6:33.22	
3	Rune Andersson; Bengt-Åke Bengtsson; Åke Berntsson; Lars-Eric Gustafsson; Ulf Gustafsson; Kjell Hansson; Per Hedenberg; Ralph Hurtig	Owe Lostad	Sweden	6:49.56	

=== Final ===
Rank	Rowers	Coxswain	Nation	Time
1st place, gold medalist(s)	Klaus Bittner; Karl-Heinrich von Groddeck; Karl-Heinz Hopp; Hans Lenk; Manfred Rulffs; Frank Schepke; Kraft Schepke; Walter Schröder	Willi Padge	United Team of Germany	5:57.18
2nd place, silver medalist(s)	David Anderson; Donald Arnold; Walter D'Hondt; Nelson Kuhn; John Lecky; Archibald MacKinnon; Bill McKerlich; Glen Mervyn	Sohen Biln	Canada	6:01.52
3rd place, bronze medalist(s)	Bohumil Janoušek; Jan Jindra; Jiří Lundák; Stanislav Lusk; Václav Pavkovič; Luděk Pojezný; Jan Švéda; Josef Věntus	Miroslav Koníček	Czechoslovakia	6:04.84
4	Jean-Louis Bellet; Émile Clerc; Jean Ledoux; Gaston Mercier; Bernard Meynadier; Joseph Moroni; Christian Puibaraud; Michel Viaud	Alain Bouffard	France	6:06.57
5	Joe Baldwin; Peter Bos; Mark Moore; Lyman S. Perry; Skip Sweetser; Gayle Thompson; Robert Wilson; Howard Winfree	William Long	United States	6:08.06
6	Paolo Amorini; Vasco Cantarello; Gian Carlo Casalini; Luigi Prato; Vincenzo Prina; Nazzareno Simonato; Luigi Spozio; Armido Torri	Giuseppe Pira	Italy	6:12.73
