= Japan at the 1960 Summer Olympics =

- IOC code: JPN (GIA used at these Games)
- NOC: Japanese Olympic Committee

in Rome
- Competitors: 162 (142 men and 20 women) in 17 sports
- Flag bearer: Takashi Ono
- Medals Ranked 8th: Gold 4 Silver 7 Bronze 7 Total 18

Summer Olympics appearances (overview)
- 1912; 1920; 1924; 1928; 1932; 1936; 1948; 1952; 1956; 1960; 1964; 1968; 1972; 1976; 1980; 1984; 1988; 1992; 1996; 2000; 2004; 2008; 2012; 2016; 2020; 2024

Japan competed at the 1960 Summer Olympics in Rome, Italy. 162 competitors, 142 men and 20 women, took part in 96 events in 17 sports. As the country hosted the next Olympics in Tokyo, the Japanese flag was raised at the closing ceremony.

== Medalists ==
Medal	Name	Sport	Event	Date
Gold	Takashi Ono; Nobuyuki Aihara; Yukio Endo; Takashi Mitsukuri; Masao Takemoto; Shuji Tsurumi	Gymnastics	Men's team all-around	September 7
Gold	Takashi Ono	Gymnastics	Men's horizontal bar	September 10
Gold	Takashi Ono	Gymnastics	Men's vault	September 10
Gold	Nobuyuki Aihara	Gymnastics	Men's floor	September 10
Silver	Yoshihiko Osaki	Swimming	Men's 200 m breaststroke	August 30
Silver	Tsuyoshi Yamanaka	Swimming	Men's 400 m freestyle	August 31
Silver	Makoto Fukui; Hiroshi Ishii; Tsuyoshi Yamanaka; Tatsuo Fujimoto	Swimming	Men's 4 × 200 m freestyle relay	September 1
Silver	Masayuki Matsubara	Wrestling	Men's freestyle flyweight	September 6
Silver	Yoshinobu Miyake	Weightlifting	Men's 56 kg	September 7
Silver	Takashi Ono	Gymnastics	Men's individual all-around	September 7
Silver	Masao Takemoto	Gymnastics	Men's horizontal bar	September 10
Bronze	Kazuo Tomita; Koichi Hirakida; Yoshihiko Osaki; Keigo Shimuzu	Swimming	Men's 4 × 100 m medley relay	September 1
Bronze	Satoko Tanaka	Swimming	Women's 100 m backstroke	September 3
Bronze	Kiyoshi Tanabe	Boxing	Men's flyweight	September 5
Bronze	Yoshihisa Yoshikawa	Shooting	Men's pistol	September 6
Bronze	Takashi Ono	Gymnastics	Men's parallel bars	September 10
Bronze	Takashi Ono	Gymnastics	Men's rings	September 10
Bronze	Shuji Tsurumi	Gymnastics	Men's pommel horse	September 10

Medals by sport
Sport	1st place, gold medalist(s)	2nd place, silver medalist(s)	3rd place, bronze medalist(s)	Total
Gymnastics	4	2	3	9
Swimming	0	3	2	5
Weightlifting	0	1	0	1
Wrestling	0	1	0	1
Boxing	0	0	1	1
Shooting	0	0	1	1
Total	4	7	7	18

== Cycling ==
Five male cyclists represented Japan in 1960.

Individual road race

- Masashi Omiya

1000m time trial

- Tetsuo Osawa

Team pursuit

- Tetsuo Osawa
- Kanji Kubomura
- Nobuhira Takanuki
- Katsuya Saito

== Diving ==
Men

Athlete	Event	Preliminary		Semi-final				Final			
Athlete	Event	Points	Rank	Points	Rank	Total	Rank	Points	Rank	Total	Rank
Shunsuke Kaneto	3 m springboard	47.51	23	Did not advance							
Toshio Yamano	3 m springboard	52.84	12 Q	41.24	5	94.08	8 Q	46.38	7	140.46	7
Shunsuke Kaneto	10 m platform	52.65	7 Q	38.34	11	90.99	10	Did not advance			
Ryo Mabuchi	10 m platform	51.12	14 Q	38.01	12	89.13	13	Did not advance			

Women

Athlete	Event	Preliminary		Semi-final				Final			
Athlete	Event	Points	Rank	Points	Rank	Total	Rank	Points	Rank	Total	Rank
Kanoko Mabuchi	3 m springboard	51.95	5 Q	28.42	16	80.37	16	Did not advance			
Kumiko Watanabe	3 m springboard	44.32	16 Q	36.25	11	80.57	14	Did not advance			
Kanoko Mabuchi	10 m platform	49.76	11 Q	—N/a				28.14	11	77.90	11
Kumiko Watanabe	10 m platform	51.04	10 Q	—N/a				28.56	10	79.60	10

== Fencing ==
Five fencers, all men, represented Japan in 1960.

Men's foil

- Mitsuyuki Funamizu
- Heizaburo Okawa
- Kazuhiko Tabuchi

Men's team foil

- Heizaburo Okawa, Mitsuyuki Funamizu, Tsugeo Ozawa, Kazuhiko Tabuchi

Men's épée

- Kazuhiko Tabuchi
- Sonosuke Fujimaki
- Tsugeo Ozawa

Men's team épée

- Heizaburo Okawa, Tsugeo Ozawa, Sonosuke Fujimaki, Kazuhiko Tabuchi

Men's sabre

- Tsugeo Ozawa
- Mitsuyuki Funamizu
- Sonosuke Fujimaki

Men's team sabre

- Sonosuke Fujimaki, Mitsuyuki Funamizu, Tsugeo Ozawa, Kazuhiko Tabuchi

== Modern pentathlon ==
Two male pentathletes represented Japan in 1960.

Individual

- Kazuhiro Tanaka
- Shigeaki Uchino

== Rowing ==
Japan had 14 male rowers participate in two out of seven rowing events in 1960.

Men's coxed four

- Koji Fukuda
- Hatsuhiko Mizuki
- Shunji Murai
- Naotake Okubo
- Osamu Saito (cox)

Men's eight

- Kenro Chiba
- Tetsuzo Hirose
- Hironori Itsuki
- Hiroshi Saito
- Tadashi Saito
- Tetsuo Sato
- Shigemi Tamura
- Yosuke Tazaki
- Hiroyuki Misawa (cox)

== Shooting ==
Eight shooters represented Japan in 1960. Yoshihisa Yoshikawa won a bronze medal in the 50 metre pistol event.

Men

Athlete	Event	Qualifying		Final	
Athlete	Event	Score	Rank	Score	Rank
Yukio Inokuma	Men's 50 metre rifle prone	384	12 Q	586	6
Takao Ishii	Men's 50 metre rifle three positions	538	24 Q	1110	30
Takao Ishii	Men's 50 metre rifle prone	385	13 Q	582	20
Kenichi Kumagai	Trap	85	33 Q	178	21
Tadao Matsui	50 m pistol	—N/a		540	12
Osamu Ochiai	25 m rapid fire pistol	—N/a		565	35
Fumio Ryosenan	25 m rapid fire pistol	—N/a		569	30
Mitsuo Yamane	Trap	?	AC	Did not advance	
Yoshihisa Yoshikawa	50 m pistol	—N/a		552	Bronze medal

== Swimming ==
Men

Athlete	Event	Heat		Semifinal		Final	
Athlete	Event	Time	Rank	Time	Rank	Time	Rank
Katsuki Ishihara	100 m freestyle	57.5	15 Q	57.8	=15	Did not advance	
Keigo Shimizu	100 m freestyle	57.3	13 Q	57.1	11	Did not advance	
Makoto Fukui	400 m freestyle	4:26.7	7 Q	—N/a		4:29.6	8
Tsuyoshi Yamanaka	400 m freestyle	4:21.0	2 Q	—N/a		4:21.4	2nd place, silver medalist(s)
Masami Nakabo	1500 m freestyle	18:30.4	14	—N/a		Did not advance	
Tsuyoshi Yamanaka	1500 m freestyle	17:46.5	2 Q	—N/a		17:34.7	4
Kazuo Tomita	100 m backstroke	1:04.7	=10 Q	1:05.2	=12	Did not advance	
Kazuo Watanabe	100 m backstroke	1:08.4	30	Did not advance			
Isao Masuda	200 m breaststroke	2:41.2	=8 Q	2:42.3	14	Did not advance	
Yoshihiko Osaki	200 m breaststroke	2:39.1	3 Q	2:38.2	2 Q	2:38.0	2nd place, silver medalist(s)
Kenzo Izutsu	200 m butterfly	2:20.3	8 Q	2:21.5	5 Q	2:19.4	8
Haruo Yoshimuta	200 m butterfly	2:19.4	7 Q	2:21.7	7 Q	2:18.3	5
Makoto Fukui; Hiroshi Ishii; Tsuyoshi Yamanaka; Tatsuo Fujimoto	4 × 200 m freestyle	8:17.1	1 Q	—N/a		8:13.2	2nd place, silver medalist(s)
Kazuo Tomita; Koichi Hirakida; Yoshihiko Osaki; Keigo Shimizu; Kazuo Watanabe; Katsuki Ishihara	4 × 100 m medley	4:16.0	=4 Q	—N/a		4:12.2	3rd place, bronze medalist(s)

Women

Athlete	Event	Heat		Semifinal		Final	
Athlete	Event	Time	Rank	Time	Rank	Time	Rank
Hitomi Jinno	100 m freestyle	1:09.8	31	Did not advance			
Yoshiko Sato	100 m freestyle	1:06.4	=17	Did not advance			
Kimiko Ezaka	400 m freestyle	5:26.8	=21	—N/a		Did not advance	
Eiko Wada	400 m freestyle	5:26.8	=21	—N/a		Did not advance	
Satoko Tanaka	100 m backstroke	1:11.5	3 Q	—N/a		1:11.4	3rd place, bronze medalist(s)
Yoshiko Takamatsu	200 m breaststroke	2:57.6	12	—N/a		Did not advance	
Shizue Miyabe	100 m butterfly	1:15.8	15	—N/a		Did not advance	
Yoshiko Sato; Eiko Wada; Kimiko Ezaka; Hitomi Jinno	4 × 100 m freestyle	4:35.9	10	—N/a		Did not advance	
Satoko Tanaka; Yoshiko Takamatsu; Shizue Miyabe; Yoshiko Sato	4 × 100 m medley	4:54.5 NR	7 Q	—N/a		4:56.4	7
