= Spain at the 1960 Summer Olympics =

- IOC code: ESP (SPA used at these Games)
- NOC: Spanish Olympic Committee

in Rome
- Competitors: 144 (133 men and 11 women) in 16 sports
- Flag bearer: Jaime Belenguer
- Medals Ranked 41st: Gold 0 Silver 0 Bronze 1 Total 1

Summer Olympics appearances (overview)
- 1900; 1904–1912; 1920; 1924; 1928; 1932; 1936; 1948; 1952; 1956; 1960; 1964; 1968; 1972; 1976; 1980; 1984; 1988; 1992; 1996; 2000; 2004; 2008; 2012; 2016; 2020; 2024

Spain competed at the 1960 Summer Olympics in Rome, Italy. The nation returned to the Summer Olympic Games after participating in the Dutch-led boycott of the 1956 Summer Olympics. 144 competitors, 133 men and 11 women, took part in 83 events in 16 sports.

== Medalists ==
=== Bronze ===
- Pedro Amat, Francisco Caballer, Juan Calzado, José Colomer, Carlos del Coso, José Dinarés, Eduardo Dualde, Joaquin Dualde, Rafael Egusquiza, Ignacio Macaya, Pedro Murúa, Pedro Roig, Luis Usoz, and Narciso Ventalló — Field Hockey, Men's Team Competition

== Basketball ==
Men's Team Competition

- Preliminary Round (Group D)

- Defeated Uruguay (77-72)
- Lost to Philippines (82-84)
- Defeated Poland (75-63)

- First Classification Round (9-16th place)

- Lost to Mexico (66-80)
- Lost to France (40-78)
- Defeated Japan (66-64)

- Second Classification Round (13-16th place)

- Lost to Puerto Rico (65-75)
- Defeated Bulgaria (2-0 walk-over) → 14th place

- Team Roster

- Agustín Bertomeu
- Alfonso Martínez
- Emiliano Rodríguez
- Francisco Buscató
- Jesús Codina
- Joaquín Enseñat
- Jorge Guillén
- Josep Lluís Cortés
- José Nora
- Juan Martos
- Miguel Ángel González
- Santiago Navarro

== Cycling ==
Nine male cyclists represented Spain in 1960.

Individual road race

- José Antonio Momeñe
- Ignacio Astigarraga
- Juan Sánchez
- Ventura Díaz

Team time trial

- Ignacio Astigarraga
- Juan Sánchez
- José Antonio Momeñe
- Ramón Sáez Marzo

Sprint

- José María Errandonea
- Francisco Tortellá

Team pursuit

- José María Errandonea
- Francisco Tortellá
- Miguel Martorell
- Miguel Mora Gornals

== Fencing ==
11 fencers, 8 men and 3 women, represented Spain in 1960.

Men's foil

- Joaquín Moya
- Enrique González
- Jesús Díez

Men's épée

- Manuel Martínez
- Jesús Díez
- Pedro Cabrera

Men's team épée

- Pedro Cabrera, Manuel Martínez, Jesús Díez, Joaquín Moya

Men's sabre

- Ramón Martínez
- Pablo Ordejón
- César de Diego

Men's team sabre

- Jesús Díez, César de Diego, Pablo Ordejón, Ramón Martínez

Women's foil

- María Shaw
- Carmen Valls
- Pilar Tosat

== Modern pentathlon ==
Two male pentathletes represented Spain in 1960.

Individual

- Joaquín Villalba
- Fernando Irayzoz

== Rowing ==
Spain had 18 male rowers participate in four out of seven rowing events in 1960.

Men's single sculls

- Julio López

Men's coxed pair

- Enrique Castelló
- José Sahuquillo
- Joaquín del Real (cox)

Men's coxed four

- Franco Cobas
- Emilio García
- José Méndez
- Alberto Valtierra
- Armando González

Men's eight

- Ignacio Alcorta
- José Almandoz
- José Aristegui
- Santiago Beitia
- José Ibarburu
- Manuel Ibarburu
- José Leiceaga
- Trimido Vaqueriza
- Faustino Amiano

== Shooting ==
Eight shooters represented Spain in 1960.

Men

| Athlete | Event | Qualifying | | Final | |
| Athlete | Event | Points | Rank | Points | Rank |
|---|---|---|---|---|---|
| José Manuel Andoin | 50 m rifle, three positions | 519 | 31 | did not advance | |
| José Luis Calvo | 50 m rifle, prone | 378 | 29 | did not advance | |
| Minervino González | 50 m pistol | —N/a | | 528 | 31 |
| Minervino González | 25 m rapid fire pistol | —N/a | | 561 | 38 |
| Rafael de Juan | Trap | AC | NQ | did not advance | |
| Ángel León | 50 m pistol | —N/a | | 537 | 18 |
| José Llorens | 50 m rifle, three positions | 378 | 29 | did not advance | |
| José Llorens | 50 m rifle, prone | 516 | 31 | did not advance | |
| Juan Malo | Trap | 90 | 14 Q | 166 | 32 |
| Luis Palomo | 25 m rapid fire pistol | —N/a | | 576 | 18 |

== Swimming ==
Men

| Athlete | Event | Heat | | Semifinal | | Final | |
| Athlete | Event | Time | Rank | Time | Rank | Time | Rank |
|---|---|---|---|---|---|---|---|
| Leopoldo Rodés | 100 m freestyle | 1:00.7 | 40 | Did not advance | | | |
| José Cossio | 400 m freestyle | 4:50.1 | 31 | —N/a | | Did not advance | |
| Miguel Torres | 1500 m freestyle | 19:21.8 | 23 | —N/a | | Did not advance | |
| Julio Cabrera | 100 m backstroke | 1:06.5 | 26 | Did not advance | | | |
| Guillermo Alsina | 200 m breaststroke | 2:51.4 | 28 | Did not advance | | | |
| Emilio Díaz | 200 m breaststroke | 2:52.9 | 31 | Did not advance | | | |
| Heriberto de la Fe | 200 m butterfly | 2:37.0 | 30 | Did not advance | | | |
| José Vicente León | 200 m butterfly | 2:31.4 | 25 | Did not advance | | | |

Women

| Athlete | Event | Heat | | Semifinal | | Final | |
| Athlete | Event | Time | Rank | Time | Rank | Time | Rank |
|---|---|---|---|---|---|---|---|
| Rita Pulido | 100 m freestyle | 1:10.0 | 32 | Did not advance | | | |
| Isabel Castañe | 200 m breaststroke | 3:10.4 | 28 | —N/a | | Did not advance | |
