= Switzerland at the 1960 Summer Olympics =

- IOC code: SUI (SVI used at these Games)
- NOC: Swiss Olympic Association

in Rome, Italy 25 August 1960 – 11 September 1960
- Competitors: 149 (147 men and 2 women) in 16 sports
- Flag bearer: August Hollenstein
- Medals Ranked 24th: Gold 0 Silver 3 Bronze 3 Total 6

Summer Olympics appearances (overview)
- 1896; 1900; 1904; 1908; 1912; 1920; 1924; 1928; 1932; 1936; 1948; 1952; 1956; 1960; 1964; 1968; 1972; 1976; 1980; 1984; 1988; 1992; 1996; 2000; 2004; 2008; 2012; 2016; 2020; 2024

Other related appearances
- 1906 Intercalated Games

Switzerland competed at the 1960 Summer Olympics in Rome, Italy. The nation returned to the Summer Olympic Games after participating in the Dutch-led boycott of the 1956 Summer Olympics. 149 competitors, 147 men and 2 women, took part in 90 events in 16 sports.

== Medalists ==
=== Silver ===
- Gustav Fischer – Equestrian, Dressage Individual Competition
- Anton Bühler, Rudolf Günthardt and Hans Schwarzenbach – Equestrian, Three-Day Event Team Competition
- Hans Rudolf Spillmann – Shooting, Men's Free Rifle, Three Positions

=== Bronze ===
- Anton Bühler – Equestrian, Three-Day Event Individual Competition
- Ernst Hürlimann and Rolf Larcher – Rowing, Men's Double Sculls
- Henri Copponex, Pierre Girard and Manfred Metzger – Sailing, 5.5 Metre

== Cycling ==
14 male cyclists represented Switzerland in 1960.

Individual road race

- Erwin Jaisli
- Emil Beeler
- Max Wechsler
- Hubert Bächli

Team time trial

- Erwin Jaisli
- Roland Zöffel
- René Rutschmann
- Hubert Bächli

Sprint

- Kurt Rechsteiner

1000m time trial

- Josef Helbling

Tandem

- Peter Vogel
- Peter Hirzel

Team pursuit

- Walter Signer
- Werner Weckert
- Hans Heinemann
- Egon Scheiwiller

== Diving ==
Men

| Athlete | Event | Preliminary | | Semi-final | | | | Final | | | |
| Athlete | Event | Points | Rank | Points | Rank | Total | Rank | Points | Rank | Total | Rank |
|---|---|---|---|---|---|---|---|---|---|---|---|
| Hans Klug | 3 m springboard | 38.65 | 31 | Did not advance | | | | | | | |

== Fencing ==
Seven fencers, all men, represented Switzerland in 1960.

Men's foil

- Jean Cerrottini
- Michel Steininger
- Claudio Polledri

Men's épée

- Jules Amez-Droz
- Claudio Polledri
- Michel Steininger

Men's team épée

- Hans Bässler, Jules Amez-Droz, Paul Meister, Charles Ribordy, Claudio Polledri, Michel Steininger

== Modern pentathlon ==
Three male pentathletes represented Switzerland in 1960.

Individual

- Erhard Minder
- Werner Vetterli
- Rolf Weber

Team

- Erhard Minder
- Werner Vetterli
- Rolf Weber

== Rowing ==
Men's single sculls

- Hugo Waser

Men's double sculls

- Ernst Hürlimann
- Rolf Larcher

Men's coxless pair

- Walter Knabenhans
- Heinrich Scherer

Men's coxless four

- Paul Kölliker
- Göpf Kottmann
- Kurt Schmid
- Rolf Streuli

Men's eight

- Rico Bianchi
- Émile Ess
- Hugo Goeggel
- Hans Graber
- Werner Kölliker
- Walter Osterwalder
- Gottfried Schär
- Hansruedi Scheller
- Werner Ehrensperger

== Shooting ==
Ten shooters represented Switzerland in 1960.

25 m pistol

- Hansruedi Schneider
- Hans Albrecht

50 m pistol

- Albert Späni
- Frédéric Michel

300 m rifle, three positions

- Hans Rudolf Spillmann
- August Hollenstein

50 m rifle, three positions

- Kurt Müller
- Hans Schönenberger

50 m rifle, prone

- Hans Rudolf Spillmann
- Hans Schönenberger

Trap

- Pierre-André Flückiger
- Louis von Sonnenberg

== Swimming ==
Men

| Athlete | Event | Heat | | Semifinal | | Final | |
| Athlete | Event | Time | Rank | Time | Rank | Time | Rank |
|---|---|---|---|---|---|---|---|
| Peter Bärtschi | 100 m freestyle | 1:02.9 | 45 | Did not advance | | | |
| Hans-Ulrich Dürst | 400 m freestyle | 4:52.5 | 33 | —N/a | | Did not advance | |
| Karl Fridlin | 400 m freestyle | 5:02.3 | 37 | —N/a | | Did not advance | |
| Hans-Ulrich Dürst | 1500 m freestyle | 19:21.9 | 24 | —N/a | | Did not advance | |
| Rainer Goltzsche | 1500 m freestyle | 20:45.1 | 30 | —N/a | | Did not advance | |
| Rolf Burggraf | 100 m backstroke | 1:11.0 | 32 | Did not advance | | | |
| Werner Risi | 200 m breaststroke | 2:56.6 | 37 | Did not advance | | | |
| Nicolas Wildhaber | 200 m breaststroke | 2:58.7 | 38 | Did not advance | | | |
| Peter Bärtschi; Rainer Goltzsche; Karl Fridlin; Hans-Ulrich Dürst | 4 × 200 m freestyle | 9:18.1 | 15 | —N/a | | Did not advance | |

Women

| Athlete | Event | Heat | | Final | |
| Athlete | Event | Time | Rank | Time | Rank |
|---|---|---|---|---|---|
| Doris Gontersweiler-Vetterli | 100 m backstroke | 1:19.6 | 25 | Did not advance | |
| Maya Hungerbühler | 200 m breaststroke | 3:10.1 | 27 | Did not advance | |
