= United Arab Republic at the 1960 Summer Olympics =

- Flag of the United Arab Republic
- IOC code: RAU

in Rome
- Competitors: 74 in 12 sports
- Medals Ranked 30th: Gold 0 Silver 1 Bronze 1 Total 2

Summer Olympics appearances (overview)
- 1960; 1964

Other related appearances
- Egypt (1912–pres.); Syria (1948–pres.)

Egypt and Syria, as the United Arab Republic, competed at the 1960 Summer Olympics in Rome, Italy. Syria was a constituent of the United Arab Republic in 1960, but almost all 74 competitors for the Olympic team were from Egypt. 74 competitors, all men, took part in 34 events in 12 sports.

Avadis Nazarkoukian from Damascus (Damas) was a member of the United Arab Republic (RAU) team at the 1960 Olympics in Rome (Italy), but he did not compete. There were 80 athletes, 9 of whom did not compete.

== United Arab Republic Medalists ==
Medal	Name	Sport	Event
Silver	Osman Sayed	Wrestling	Men's Greco-Roman flyweight (−52 kg)
Bronze	Abdel Moneim El-Guindi	Boxing	Men's flyweight (−51 kg)

== Diving ==
Men

Athlete	Event	Preliminary		Semi-final				Final			
Athlete	Event	Points	Rank	Points	Rank	Total	Rank	Points	Rank	Total	Rank
Ahmed Moharran	3 m springboard	42.98	28	Did not advance							
Ali Muheeb	3 m springboard	35.79	32	Did not advance							
Ahmed Moharran	10 m platform	45.10	24	Did not advance							
Moustafa Hassan	10 m platform	43.82	25	Did not advance							

== Fencing ==
Six fencers represented the United Arab Republic in 1960.

Men's foil

- Ahmed El-Hamy El-Husseini
- Moustafa Soheim
- Mohamed Gamil El-Kalyoubi

Men's team foil

- Farid El-Ashmawi, Moustafa Soheim, Mohamed Gamil El-Kalyoubi, Ahmed El-Hamy El-Husseini, Sameh Abdel Rahman, Ahmed Zein El-Abidin

== Rowing ==
United Arab Republic had nine male rowers participate in one out of seven rowing events in 1960.

Men's eight

- Abdallah Gazi
- Abdel Sattar Abdel Hadj
- Mohamed Abdel Sami
- Abdel Fattah Abou-Shanab
- Taha Hassouba
- Saleh Ibrahim
- Ibrahim Abdulhalim
- Abdel Mohsen Saad
- Abbas Khamis

== Shooting ==
Three shooters represented the United Arab Republic in 1960.

25 m pistol

- Ali El-Kashef

Trap

- Hussam El-Badrawi
- Hassan Moaffi
