= Joe Mullins =

Joe Mullins may refer to:

- Joe Mullins (athlete) (born 1937), Canadian athlete
- Joe Mullins (musician), American banjo player
- Joe Mullins (military), British soldier and evangelical minister
