= John Ledder =

Australian rower

Personal information
- Full name: John Russell Ledder
- Nationality: Australian
- Born: 12 March 1937 (age 89) Sri Lanka

Sport
- Sport: Rowing
- Club: Swan River Rowing Club

Achievements and titles
- National finals: King's Cup 1959,60

John Ledder (born 12 March 1937) is an Australian former representative rower. He was a 1960 national champion and competed in the men's eight event at the 1960 Summer Olympics.

== Club and state rowing ==
Born in Sri Lanka Ledder arrived with his family aged 10 in 1947. He was educated at Hale School in Perth where he took up rowing. His senior club rowing was from the Swan River Rowing Club.

Ledder first made state representative selection for Western Australia in the 1959 senior eight which contested and placed third at the King's Cup at the Australian annual Interstate Regatta. He was then one of only two 1959 WA King's Cup oarsmen (the other was Milton Francis) whom coach Ken Grant agreed to retain into the 1960 crew as he sought to build a heavy and more powerful eight. This enabled Ledder to be part of the 1960 King's Cup win and the Olympic representation.

== International representative rowing ==
The entire West Australian champion King's Cup eight of 1960 were selected without alteration as the Australian eight to compete at the 1960 Rome Olympics. The crew was graded as the second of the seven Australian Olympic boats picked for Rome and was therefore fully funded by the Australian Olympic Committee. Ledder rowed in the three seat of the eight. They were eliminated in the repechage on Lake Albano at the 1960 Olympics.
