= Max Cunningham (rower) =

Australian rower (1936–2025)

Personal information
- Full name: Alexander Maxwell Cunningham
- Nationality: Australian
- Born: 9 June 1936 Western Australia, Australia
- Died: 14 December 2025 (aged 89) Perth

Sport
- Sport: Rowing
- Club: Swan River Rowing Club

Achievements and titles
- National finals: King's Cup 1958, 1960

Alexander Maxwell Cunningham (9 June 1936 – 14 December 2025) was an Australian representative rower. He was a 1960 national champion and competed in the men's eight event at the 1960 Summer Olympics.

== Club and state rowing ==
Cunningham was educated at Aquinas College, Perth and he rowed in that school's first VIII in his two final years of school. His senior club rowing was from the Swan River Rowing Club.

Cunningham made his first state representative selection for Western Australia in the 1958 senior eight which contested and placed second at the King's Cup at the Australian annual Interstate Regatta. The race was highly eventful for Cunningham when during the second mile he suffered a partial blackout and then with 300yds to go he collapsed and fell back in his seat preventing the bow three behind him to run their seats. The stern four rowed on and managed to bring the boat in in second place to Victoria.

Cunningham did not make the 1959 WA eight but he benefitted from the policy adopted by coach Ken Grant to retain only two members of the 1959 WA King's Cup crew into the 1960 boat as he sought to build a heavy and more powerful eight. This enabled Cunningham to come back into the four seat for the 1960 King's Cup win and to make Olympic representation.

== International representative rowing ==
The entire West Australian champion King's Cup eight of 1960 were selected without alteration as the Australian eight to compete at the 1960 Rome Olympics. The crew was graded as the second of the seven Australian Olympic boats picked for Rome and was therefore fully funded by the Australian Olympic Committee. Cunningham rowed in the four seat of the eight. They were eliminated in the repechage on Lake Albano at the 1960 Olympics.
