= Berry Durston =

Australian rower

Personal information
- Nationality: Australian
- Born: 1 August 1940 Western Australia, Australia
- Died: 19 January 2007 (aged 66) Perth, Western Australia, Australia

Sport
- Sport: Rowing
- Club: Uni of WA Boat Club

Achievements and titles
- National finals: King's Cup 1960-65, 1971

Berry Haworth Durston AM (1 August 1940 – 19 January 2007) was an Australian representative rower and an accomplished rowing administrator and racing official. He competed in the men's eight event at the 1960 Summer Olympics.

== Club and state rowing ==
Durston's senior club rowing was from West Australian Rowing Club and later the University of Western Australia Boat Club.

Durston made his first state representative selection for Western Australia in the 1960 senior eight which contested and won the King's Cup at the Australian annual Interstate Regatta. He benefitted from the policy adopted by coach Ken Grant to retain only two members of the 1959 WA King's Cup crew into the 1960 boat as he sought to build a heavy and more powerful eight. This enabled Durston to take the two seat for the 1960 King's Cup win and to make Olympic representation.

Post-Olympics Durston made five further King's Cup appearances for Western Australia resulting in four podium finishes. He was consistently selected from 1960 to 65 and then raced his final King's Cup event in 1971.

== International representative rowing ==
The entire West Australian champion King's Cup eight of 1960 were selected without alteration as the Australian eight to compete at the 1960 Rome Olympics. The crew was graded as the second of the seven Australian Olympic boats picked for Rome and was therefore fully funded by the Australian Olympic Committee. Durston rowed in the six seat of the eight. They were eliminated in the repechage on Lake Albano at the 1960 Olympics.

== Rowing administrator ==
Durston was the team manager of the West Australian team for the Interstate Regatta in 1973. From 1974 to 1979 and then again from 1990 to 2002 he was a West Australian representative on the council of Rowing Australia. He served as Treasurer and President of the West Australian Rowing Association during the 1970s and 80s and was made a life member of that organisation in 1977. He served as President of Rowing Australia from 1979–83 and became a life member in 1993.

== Racing official ==
Durston achieved his Australian umpire's license in 1977 and then consistently umpired at Australian Rowing Championships and Interstate Regattas over the next 25 years. He earnt his FISA license in 1986, was on the jury of the 1990 and 1994 World Rowing Championships and was a technical official at the 2000 Sydney Olympics regatta.
