= John Rosser =

John Rosser may refer to:

- John Rosser (cricketer), Australian cricketer
- John Rosser (rower), Australian rower
- J. Barkley Rosser, American logician
- J. Barkley Rosser Jr., his son, mathematical economist and professor of economics
