= Terrence Scook =

Australian rower

Personal information
- Nationality: Australian
- Born: 8 February 1935 (age 91) Western Australia, Australia

Sport
- Sport: Rowing

Terrence Scook (born 8 February 1935) is an Australian former representative rowing coxswain. He competed in the men's eight event at the 1960 Summer Olympics. A Western Australian, Scook coxed state crews competing at the elite national level over a 43 year competitive career from 1951 to 1994.

== Club and state rowing ==
Scook's joined the West Australian Rowing Club as a fourteen year old in 1949 and in that debut year steered Don Fraser and Bryn Haaguard to a state championship in the coxed pair. Most of his career was from the WARC although in 1970s he raced in ANA Rowing Club colours.

In the 1990s Scook took up the rudder ropes at the Curtin University Rowing Club where coach Tony Lovrich was running a successful high performance sweep men's squad under the auspices of the Western Australian Institute of Sport.

Scook first made state representative selection for Western Australia in the 1951 senior eight which contested and placed third in the King's Cup at the Australian annual Interstate Regatta. In his long career Scook raced 19 times in WA eights for the King's Cup, 3 times in women's fours for the ULVA trophy and once in the lightweight women's four for the Victoria Cup.

== International representative rowing ==
The entire West Australian champion King's Cup eight of 1960 were selected without alteration as the Australian eight to compete at the 1960 Rome Olympics. The crew was graded as the second of the seven Australian Olympic boats picked for Rome and was therefore fully funded by the Australian Olympic Committee. They were eliminated in the repechage on Lake Albano at the 1960 Olympics.

== Palmares ==
=== Olympic Games ===
- 1960 – eliminated in repechage

=== The King's Cup ===
- 1951– 3rd
- 1954– 4th
- 1955– 1st
- 1956– 4th
- 1958– 2nd
- 1959– 3rd
- 1960– 1st
- 1961– 3rd
- 1962– 2nd
- 1963– 3rd
- 1964– 3rd
- 1965– 3rd
- 1971– eliminated in repechage
- 1989– 3rd in challenge event
- 1990– 2nd
- 1991– 3rd
- 1992– 2nd
- 1993– 2nd
- 1994– 4th

=== The ULVA Trophy ===
- 1974– 3rd cox & coach
- 1977– 2nd coach
- 1978– 2nd cox & coach

=== The Victoria Cup ===
- 1974– 4th
