= Maxwell Gamble =

Australian rower (1939–2026)

Personal information
- Full name: Maxwell Stanley Gamble
- Nationality: Australian
- Born: 8 January 1939 Perth, Western Australia, Australia
- Died: 11 May 2026 (aged 87) Kalgoorlie, Western Australia, Australia

Sport
- Sport: Rowing
- Club: Perth Rowing Club

Achievements and titles
- National finals: King's Cup 1960

Maxwell Stanley Gamble (8 January 1939 – 11 May 2026) was an Australian rower. He competed in the men's eight event at the 1960 Summer Olympics.

== Club and state rowing ==
Gamble's senior club rowing was from the Edith Cowan University and later the Perth Rowing Club.

He made his sole state representative selection for Western Australia in the 1960 senior eight which contested and won the King's Cup at the Australian annual Interstate Regatta. He benefitted from the policy adopted by coach Ken Grant to retain only two members of the 1959 WA King's Cup crew into the 1960 boat as he sought to build a heavy and more powerful eight. This enabled Gamble to take the five seat for the 1960 King's Cup win and to make Olympic representation.

== International representative rowing ==
The entire West Australian champion King's Cup eight of 1960 were selected without alteration as the Australian eight to compete at the 1960 Rome Olympics. The crew was graded as the second of the seven Australian Olympic boats picked for Rome and was therefore fully funded by the Australian Olympic Committee. Gamble rowed in the five seat of the eight. They were eliminated in the repechage on Lake Albano at the 1960 Olympics.

== Death ==
Gamble died in Kalgoorlie on 11 May 2026, at the age of 87.
