= Fridlin =

Fridlin is a surname. Notable people with the surname include:

- Karl Fridlin (born 1935), Swiss swimmer
- Semyon Fridlin (1909–1992), Moldovan/Soviet architect
