= Beitia =

Beitia is a surname. Notable people with the surname include:

- Beitia (footballer) (1936-2006), Gonzalo Díaz Beitia, Spanish footballer
- Isaac Beitia (born 1995), Panamanian swimmer
- Joseba Beitia (born 1990), Spanish footballer
- Ruth Beitia (born 1979), Spanish high jumper
- Santiago Beitia (born 1938), Spanish rower
- Xavier Beitia (born 1982), American football placekicker
