= Kenrō =

- Gender: Male

Origin
- Origin: Japanese
- Meaning: Different meanings depending on the kanji used

Kenrō, Kenro or Kenrou (written: 建郎 or 研郎) is a masculine Japanese given name. Notable people with the name include:

- Kenro Chiba (千葉 建郎; born 1937), Japanese rower
- Kenro Izu (井津 建郎; born 1949), Japanese photographer
- Kenro Shimoyama (下山 研郎; born 1982), Japanese freestyle skier
