= Tetsuo Satō =

Tetsuo Satō may refer to:

- Tetsuo Sato (rower) (佐藤 哲夫, born 1938), Japanese rower
- Tetsuo Satō (volleyball) (佐藤 哲夫, 1949-2025), Japanese volleyball player
