= Goltzsche =

Goltzsche is a German language surname. Notable people with the name include:

- Dieter Goltzsche (1934), German painter and graphic designer
- Rainer Goltzsche (1936), Swiss former freestyle swimmer
