= Bächli =

Bächli is a Swiss German surname meaning little stream. Notable people with the surname include:

- Hubert Bächli (born 1938), Swiss cyclist
- Silvia Bächli (born 1956), Swiss visual artist
- Ulrich Bächli (born 1950), Swiss bobsledder
