= Vaqueriza =

Vaqueriza is a surname. Notable people with this surname include:

- Felipe Vaqueriza (born 1975), Spanish footballer
- José Antonio Santamaría Vaqueriza (1946–1993), Spanish footballer
- Trimido Vaqueriza (born 1929), Spanish rower
