= John Rosser (rower) =

Australian rower

Personal information
- Nationality: Australian
- Born: 7 November 1938 (age 87) Western Australia, Australia

Sport
- Sport: Rowing
- Club: West Australian Rowing Club

Achievements and titles
- National finals: President's Cup 1956-57; King's Cup 1960,61,64

John Rosser (born 7 November 1938) is an Australian former representative rower. He was a national champion in 1960 and 1961 and competed in the men's eight event at the 1960 Summer Olympics.

== Rowing family ==
John's father Gra rowed in Western Australian men's senior eights contesting the King's Cup at the annual Interstate Regattas in 1925, 1927 and 1929. John's son Ben Rosser also rowed for Western Australia, in youth eights in 1985-86 and in King's Cup eights in 1987 and 1989.

== Club and state rowing ==
John Rosser was educated at Hale School in Perth where he took up rowing. His senior club rowing was from the West Australian Rowing Club.

Rosser first made state representative selection for Western Australia in 1956 when he was one of two WA scullers selected (as was the practice of the time) to contest the President's Cup for single scullers at the annual Interstate Regatta. He again raced for WA for the President's Cup in 1957 and placed third. Although Rosser won silver medals at WA state championships in sculling and sweep boats in 1958 he did not row for the state in 1958-59.

Rosser benefitted from the policy adopted by coach Ken Grant to retain only two members of the 1959 WA King's Cup crew into the 1960 boat as he sought to build a heavy and more powerful eight. This enabled Rosser to take the stroke seat for the 1960 King's Cup win and to make Olympic representation. After the Olympics Rosser rowed on and he stroked the WA King's Cup eights in 1961 (for a win) and in 1964 (for a third place).

== International representative rowing ==
The entire West Australian champion King's Cup eight of 1960 were selected without alteration as the Australian eight to compete at the 1960 Rome Olympics. The crew was graded as the second of the seven Australian Olympic boats picked for Rome and was therefore fully funded by the Australian Olympic Committee. Rosser stroked the eight. They were eliminated in the repechage on Lake Albano at the 1960 Olympics.
