= Geoffrey Hale =

Australian rower (born 1938)

Personal information
- Nationality: Australian
- Born: 25 March 1938 (age 88) Western Australia, Australia

Sport
- Sport: Rowing
- Club: ANA Rowing Club

Achievements and titles
- National finals: King's Cup 1960

Geoffrey Hale (born 25 March 1938) is an Australian former representative rower. He was a 1960 national champion and competed in the men's eight event at the 1960 Summer Olympics.

== Club and state rowing ==
Hale was educated at Guildford Grammar School in Perth from 1951-53. His senior club rowing was from the ANA Rowing Club.

Hale made his sole state representative selection for Western Australia in the 1960 senior eight, which contested and won the King's Cup at the Australian annual Interstate Regatta. He benefitted from the policy adopted by coach Ken Grant to retain only two members of the 1959 WA King's Cup crew into the 1960 boat as he sought to build a heavy and more powerful eight. This enabled Hale to take the two seat for the 1960 King's Cup win and to make Olympic representation.

== International representative rowing ==
The entire West Australian champion King's Cup eight of 1960 were selected without alteration as the Australian eight to compete at the 1960 Rome Olympics. The crew was graded as the second of the seven Australian Olympic boats picked for Rome and was therefore fully funded by the Australian Olympic Committee. Hale rowed in the two seat of the eight. They were eliminated in the repechage on Lake Albano at the 1960 Olympics.
