= Viktor Barinov =

Soviet rower

Personal information
- Born: 12 July 1938 Leningrad, Soviet Union
- Died: 30 April 2016 (aged 77)
- Height: 183 cm (6 ft 0 in)
- Weight: 83 kg (183 lb)

Sport
- Sport: Rowing

Viktor Barinov (Russian: Виктор Баринов; 12 July 1938 – 30 April 2016) was a Soviet rower. He competed at the 1960 Summer Olympics in Rome with the men's eight where they were eliminated in the heats.
