= William Long (rowing) =

American rower

Personal information
- Born: October 3, 1935 Little Rock, Arkansas, United States
- Died: March 19, 2010 (aged 74)
- Height: 175 cm (5 ft 9 in)
- Weight: 61 kg (134 lb)

Sport
- Sport: Rowing

William Long (October 3, 1935 – March 19, 2010) was an American coxswain. He competed in the men's eight event at the 1960 Summer Olympics.
