= Peter Bos (rower) =

American rower

Peter Bos OLY
Personal information
- Nationality: American
- Born: May 30, 1938 (age 88) North Tonawanda, New York, United States

Sport
- Sport: Rowing

Peter G. Bos (born May 30, 1938) is an American rower. He competed in the men's eight event at the 1960 Summer Olympics. He graduated from United States Naval Academy and Harvard Business School.

After graduating, Bos worked for an international consulting company and later developed renewable energy power plants. He eventually retired with his wife in Naples.
