= Gayle Thompson =

American rower (1938–2025)

Personal information
- Full name: Gayle Robert Thompson
- Born: December 12, 1938 Ogden, Utah, U.S.
- Died: August 13, 2025 (aged 86) Nokomis, Florida, U.S.

Sport
- Sport: Rowing

Gayle Robert Thompson (December 12, 1938 – August 13, 2025) was an American rower. He competed in the men's eight event at the 1960 Summer Olympics.

Thompson died on August 13, 2025 in Nokomis, Florida, at the age of 86.
