= Mikhail Balenkov =

Soviet rower

Personal information
- Born: 6 March 1940; Leningrad, Soviet Union
- Died: 1995
- Height: 182 cm (6 ft 0 in)
- Weight: 78 kg (172 lb)

Sport
- Sport: Rowing

Mikhail Pavlovich Balenkov (Russian name: Михаил Баленков; 6 March 1940 – 1995) was a Soviet rower. He competed at the 1960 Summer Olympics in Rome with the men's eight where they were eliminated in the heats.
