= Donald Shaw (rower) =

British rower

Personal information
- Nationality: British
- Born: 3 February 1939; Timperley, England
- Died: 12 November 2021 (aged 82)

Sport
- Sport: Rowing

Donald William Shaw (3 February 1939 – 12 November 2021) was a British rower. He competed in the men's eight event at the 1960 Summer Olympics.

Shaw attended Ludgrove School as a child. He graduated from Keble College, Oxford.
