= Richard Fishlock =

British rower

Personal information
- Nationality: British
- Born: 17 August 1936 (age 89) Kampala, Uganda

Sport
- Sport: Rowing

Richard Fishlock (born 17 August 1936) is a British rower. He competed in the men's eight event at the 1960 Summer Olympics. Competed in the Oxford v Cambridge University Boat Race 1960 (won) Henley Royal Regatta Grand Challenge Finalist 1960 and 1961, Henley Royal Regatta 1958 Visitors Cup Finalist
