= Bernard Meynadier =

French rower (born 1938)

Personal information
- Born: 19 April 1938 (age 88) Saint-Germain-en-Laye, France
- Height: 186 cm (6 ft 1 in)
- Weight: 83 kg (183 lb)

Sport
- Sport: Rowing
Medal record
Men's rowing
Representing France
World Rowing Championships
Bronze medal – third place	1962 Lucerne	Eight
European Rowing Championships
Bronze medal – third place	1961 Prague	Eight

Bernard Meynadier (born 19 April 1938) is a French rower. He competed at the 1960 Summer Olympics in Rome with the men's eight where they came fourth.
