= Swissair Flight 306 =

1963 aviation accident

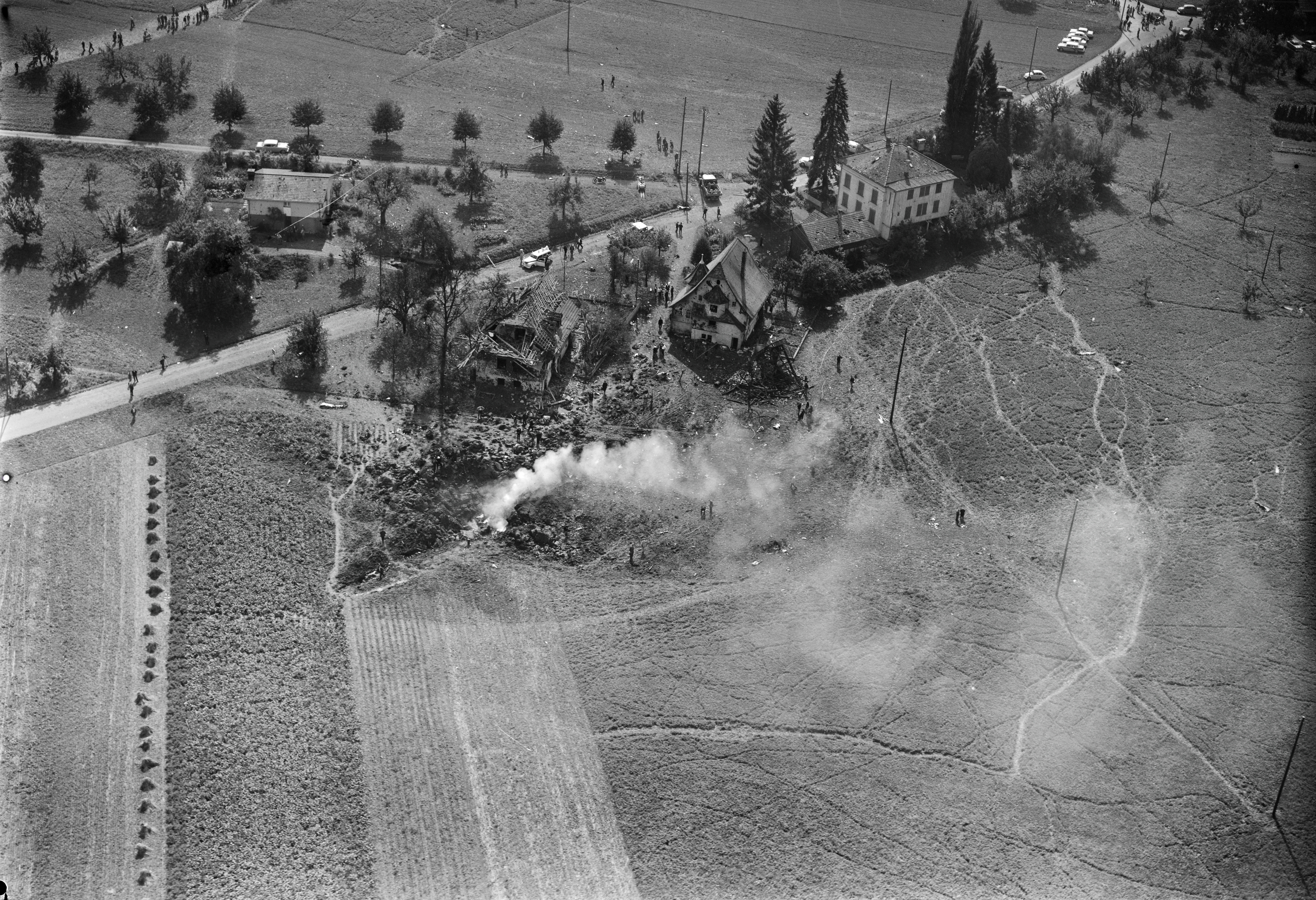
- Crash site of SR 306 near Dürrenäsch

Accident
- Date: 4 September 1963
- Summary: In-flight fire leading to hydraulic failure and loss of control
- Site: Near Dürrenäsch, Switzerland; 47°19′29″N 8°09′33″E

Aircraft
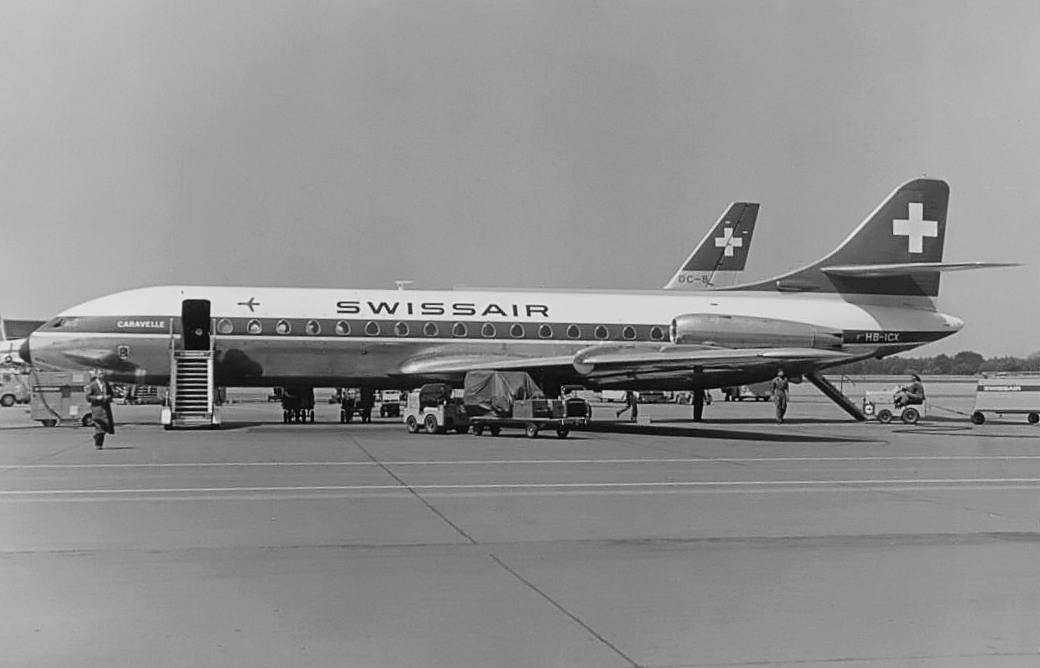
- HB-ICX, sister aircraft to the crashed aircraft HB-ICV.
- Aircraft type: Sud Aviation SE-210 Caravelle III
- Aircraft name: Schaffhausen
- Operator: Swissair
- Registration: HB-ICV
- Flight origin: Zurich Airport
- Stopover: Geneva International Airport
- Destination: Fiumicino Airport
- Passengers: 74
- Crew: 6
- Fatalities: 80
- Survivors: 0

Swissair Flight 306, a Sud Aviation Caravelle named Schaffhausen, was a scheduled international flight from Zurich to Rome, via Geneva. It crashed near Dürrenäsch, Aargau, on 4 September 1963, shortly after take-off, killing all 80 people on board.

== Timeline ==
Zurich Airport was in dense fog when the plane was due to take off at 06:00 UTC. At 06:04 the flight was allowed to taxi to runway 34 behind an escorting vehicle. At 06:05 the crew reported that they would taxi halfway down runway 34 to inspect the fog and then return to the takeoff point. This was done using high engine power in order to disperse the fog. Around 06:12 the aircraft returned to runway 34 and was allowed to take off, which it did at 06:13, and started to climb to flight level 150 (about 15,000 feet (4,600 m)), its cruising height.

Four minutes later people on the ground noticed a white trail of smoke coming from the left side of the aircraft. Shortly after, a long flame erupted from the left wing. Around 06:20 the aircraft reached a height of about 2,700 metres (8,900 ft). It then began to descend, entering a gentle left turn before losing height more quickly. It then went into a final, steep dive.

At 06:21 a Mayday message was issued. At 06:22 the aircraft crashed into the ground on the outskirts of Dürrenäsch, approximately 35 kilometres (22 mi; 19 nmi) from Zurich Airport.

== Probable cause ==
The aircraft's brakes overheated due to the application of full engine power during taxiing. This caused the magnesium wheels to burst, one of them on the runway prior to departure. Upon retraction of the landing gear, the hydraulic lines in the gear bay were damaged. This was caused either by the wheels that had exploded, or the bursting of the other wheel rims during the climb. Subsequently, spilled hydraulic fluid ignited when it came in contact with the overheated landing gear rims. The fire damaged the gear bay, followed by the wing. The data from the airplane's flight recorder combined with a lack of radio calls from the crew suggested that they likely began experiencing difficulties at 06:18. Irregularities in the data beginning roughly two minutes later indicated that the fire was causing electrical problems, while wreckage analysis suggested that parts of the airplane were detaching "with increasing frequency" around this time. The left engine had shut down prior to the crash; whether this was from crew action or a failure caused by the fire is unknown. The cause for the final loss of control was not conclusively determined. The rigidity of the left wing and rear fuselage, the integrity of the hydraulic flight control system, and the elevator control unit were all noted as possible areas the fire may have affected in the final portion of the flight to an extent which would have caused a rapid loss of control.

== Result ==
As a result of this accident, all Caravelles were modified to use non-flammable hydraulic fluids.

== Casualties and aftermath ==
There were 74 Swiss nationals on board as well as two Americans (one dual citizenship with Iran), one Briton, one Egyptian (Olympic rower Ibrahim Abdulhalim), one Israeli, and one passenger was either from Belgium or Austria.

This crash severely affected the small village of Humlikon in the Canton of Zurich: 43 of its 217 citizens (20% of the population) had boarded the plane to visit a farm test site near Geneva. Among those who perished were the entire local council, all members of the local school board, and the village's post office clerk. A number of children who were orphaned were looked after at home by relatives, and six of these children had to move, all but one of whom went to live with relatives nearby.

Further problems arose with the upkeep of the local farms, but people from the nearby villages helped. Apprentices came from local firms, students, firemen, soldiers, boy scouts, railroad workers and policemen, as well as volunteer school children, and even from abroad to help. Approximately 600 tons of potatoes were harvested manually, corn was threshed and the new crop seeds were sown in time. Just over a month after the crash, a new council was elected by the 52 remaining eligible voters.

== See also ==
- Nigeria Airways Flight 2120 – a 1991 crash caused by a similar landing gear fire
- Air France Flight 4590 – a 2000 crash caused by an in-flight fire triggered by tire burst on take-off
- Swissair Flight 111 – another in-flight fire incident suffered by Swissair
- Mexicana Flight 940 – A 1986 crash involving landing gear fire
- Propair Flight 420 – A 1998 crash involving landing gear fire
