= Karl-Heinz Hopp =

German rower (1936–2007)

Personal information
- Born: 20 November 1936 Allenstein, Germany
- Died: 11 February 2007 (aged 70) Lübeck, Germany
- Height: 191 cm (6 ft 3 in)
- Weight: 90 kg (198 lb)

Sport
- Sport: Rowing; Pentathlon
- Club: ATV Ditmarsia Kiel
Medal record
Men's rowing
Representing Germany
Olympic Games
Gold medal – first place	1960 Rome	Eight
Representing West Germany
European Rowing Championships
Gold medal – first place	1958 Poznań	Eight
Gold medal – first place	1959 Mâcon	Eight
Gold medal – first place	1961 Prague	Coxless four

Karl-Heinz Hopp (20 November 1936 – 11 February 2007) was a German rower who competed for the United Team of Germany in the 1960 Summer Olympics.

Hopp was born in Allenstein, which is today called Olsztyn situated in Poland.

At the 1958 European Rowing Championships in Poznań, he won a gold medal with the coxless four. At the 1959 European Rowing Championships in Mâcon, he won a gold medal with the eight. At the 1960 Summer Olympics, he was a crew member of the German eight that won gold. At the 1961 European Rowing Championships in Prague, he won a gold medal with the coxed four.

After rowing, Hopp swapped to pentathlon and most enjoyed the equestrian part. He became a vet and had a large horse stable with his wife. He died in Lübeck on 11 February 2007.
