= Viktor Bogachev =

Soviet rower

Personal information
- Born: 30 September 1938 (age 86); Leningrad, Soviet Union
- Height: 182 cm (6 ft 0 in)
- Weight: 81 kg (179 lb)

Sport
- Sport: Rowing

Viktor Fomich Bogachev (Russian name: Виктор Богачев; born 30 September 1938) is a Soviet rower. He competed at the 1960 Summer Olympics in Rome with the men's eight where they were eliminated in the heats.
