= Vincenzo Prina =

Italian rower

Personal information
- Nationality: Italian
- Born: 13 December 1936 (age 89) Varese, Italy

Sport
- Sport: Rowing

Vincenzo Prina (born 13 December 1936) is an Italian former rower. He competed in the men's eight event at the 1960 Summer Olympics.
