= Michael Davis (rower) =

British rower

Personal information
- Nationality: British
- Born: 24 June 1940 Arundel, England
- Died: 15 September 2001 (aged 61) Reading

Sport
- Sport: Rowing

Michael Davis (24 June 1940 – 15 September 2001) was a British rower. He competed in the men's eight event at the 1960 Summer Olympics.
