= Paolo Amorini =

Italian rower

Personal information
- Nationality: Italian
- Born: 5 July 1937 (age 87); Livorno, Italy

Sport
- Sport: Rowing

Paolo Amorini (born 5 July 1937) is an Italian rower. He competed in the men's eight event at the 1960 Summer Olympics.
