= Mark Moore (rower) =

American rower

Personal information
- Nationality: American
- Born: February 15, 1939 (age 87) Whittier, California, United States

Sport
- Sport: Rowing

Mark Moore (born February 15, 1939) is an American rower. He competed in the men's eight event at the 1960 Summer Olympics.
