= Michel Viaud =

French rower (1940–2001)

Personal information
- Born: 15 February 1940 Nantes, France
- Died: 16 May 2001 (aged 61)
- Height: 186 cm (6 ft 1 in)
- Weight: 80 kg (176 lb)

Sport
- Sport: Rowing
Medal record
Men's rowing
Representing France
World Rowing Championships
Bronze medal – third place	1962 Lucerne	Eight
European Rowing Championships
Bronze medal – third place	1961 Prague	Eight

Michel Viaud (15 February 1940 – 16 May 2001) was a French rower. He competed at the 1960 Summer Olympics in Rome with the men's eight where they came fourth.
