= Per Hedenberg =

Swedish rower (1936–2023)

Personal information
- Nationality: Swedish
- Born: 17 May 1936; Mölndal, Sweden
- Died: 22 November 2023 (aged 87); Mölndal, Sweden

Sport
- Sport: Rowing

Per Hedenberg (17 May 1936 – 22 November 2023) was a Swedish rower. He competed in the men's eight event at the 1960 Summer Olympics. Hedenberg died in Mölndal on 22 November 2023, at the age of 87.
