= John Chester (rower) =

British rower (1935–2022)

Personal information
- Nationality: British
- Born: 25 October 1935 Singapore, Straits Settlements
- Died: 7 April 2022 (aged 86)
- Education: Monkton Combe School

Sport
- Sport: Rowing

John Chester (25 October 1935 – 7 April 2022) was a British rower. He competed in the men's eight event at the 1960 Summer Olympics.

Chester died on 7 April 2022, at the age of 86.
