= Peter Reynolds (rowing) =

British coxswain

Personal information
- Nationality: British
- Born: 26 August 1937 (age 87); Sheffield, England
- Height: 173 cm (5 ft 8 in)
- Weight: 52 kg (115 lb)

Sport
- Sport: Rowing

Peter Reynolds (born 26 August 1937) is a British coxswain. He competed in the men's eight event at the 1960 Summer Olympics.
