= Leonid Ivanov (rower) =

Soviet rower

Personal information
- Born: 27 August 1938; Leningrad, Soviet Union
- Died: 13 July 2019 (aged 80)
- Height: 173 cm (5 ft 8 in)
- Weight: 70 kg (154 lb)

Sport
- Sport: Rowing

Leonid Ivanovich Ivanov (Russian name: Леонид Иванов; 27 August 1938 – 13 July 2019) was a Soviet rower. He competed at the 1960 Summer Olympics in Rome with the men's eight where they were eliminated in the heats.
