= Alain Bouffard =

French rower

Personal information
- Born: 24 September 1939 (age 87) Nantes, France
- Height: 165 cm (5 ft 5 in)
- Weight: 52 kg (115 lb)

Sport
- Sport: Rowing
Medal record
Men's rowing
Representing France
World Rowing Championships
Bronze medal – third place	1962 Lucerne	Eight
European Rowing Championships
Bronze medal – third place	1961 Prague	Eight

Alain Bouffard (born 24 September 1939) is a French coxswain. He competed at the 1960 Summer Olympics in Rome with the men's eight where they came fourth.
