= Graham Cooper (rower) =

British rower (1941–2024)

Personal information
- Nationality: British
- Born: 14 March 1941; Willaston, England
- Died: 8 May 2024 (aged 83)

Sport
- Sport: Rowing

Graham Vaughan Cooper (14 March 1941 – 8 May 2024) was a British rower. He competed in the men's eight event at the 1960 Summer Olympics. Cooper died at home on 8 May 2024, at the age of 83.
