= Voldemar Dundur =

Soviet rower (1938–2023)

Personal information
- Born: 8 April 1938; Leningrad, Russian SFSR, USSR
- Died: 14 April 2023 (aged 85)
- Height: 182 cm (6 ft 0 in)
- Weight: 82 kg (181 lb)

Sport
- Sport: Rowing

Voldemar Petrovich Dundur (Russian name: Вольдемар Дундур; 8 April 1938 – 14 April 2023) was a Soviet rower. He competed at the 1960 Summer Olympics in Rome with the men's eight where they were eliminated in the heats.

Dundur died on 14 April 2023, at the age of 85.
