= Luigi Spozio =

Italian rower

Personal information
- Nationality: Italian
- Born: 17 April 1936; Lodi, Italy
- Died: 22 October 1999 (aged 63)

Sport
- Sport: Rowing

Luigi Spozio (17 April 1936 – 22 October 1999) was an Italian rower. He competed in the men's eight event at the 1960 Summer Olympics.
