= Vladimir Malik =

Soviet rower

Personal information
- Born: 31 March 1938 (age 86); Leningrad, Soviet Union
- Height: 178 cm (5 ft 10 in)
- Weight: 76 kg (168 lb)

Sport
- Sport: Rowing

Vladimir Malik (Russian name: Владимир Малик; born 31 March 1938) is a Soviet rower. He competed at the 1960 Summer Olympics in Rome with the men's eight where they were eliminated in the heats.
