= Joseph Moroni =

French rower (1938–2020)

Personal information
- Born: 10 January 1938 Neuilly-Plaisance, France
- Died: 2 July 2020 (aged 82) Brem-sur-Mer, France
- Height: 187 cm (6 ft 2 in)
- Weight: 85 kg (187 lb)

Sport
- Sport: Rowing
Medal record
Men's rowing
Representing France
World Rowing Championships
| Bronze medal – third place | 1962 Lucerne | Eight |
European Rowing Championships
| Bronze medal – third place | 1961 Prague | Eight |

Joseph Moroni (10 January 1938 – 2 July 2020 in Brem-sur-Mer) was a French rower. He competed at the 1960 Summer Olympics in Rome with the men's eight where they came fourth.
