= Luigi Prato =

Italian rower

Personal information
- Nationality: Italian
- Born: 20 September 1937; Santa Margherita Ligure, Italy
- Died: 4 July 2002 (aged 64)

Sport
- Sport: Rowing

Luigi Prato (20 September 1937 – 4 July 2002) was an Italian rower. He competed in the men's eight event at the 1960 Summer Olympics.
