= Armido Torri =

Italian rower (1938–2022)

Personal information
- Nationality: Italian
- Born: 5 November 1938; Oliveto Lario, Lecco, Italy
- Died: 23 January 2022 (aged 83); Opera, Milano, Italy

Sport
- Sport: Rowing

Armido Torri (5 November 1938 – 23 January 2022) was an Italian rower. He competed in the men's eight event at the 1960 Summer Olympics. He died in Opera on 23 January 2022, at the age of 83.
