= Howard Winfree =

American rower (born 1938)

Personal information
- Born: June 26, 1938 (age 88) Chester, Pennsylvania, United States

Sport
- Sport: Rowing

Howard Winfree (born June 26, 1938) is an American rower. He competed in the men's eight event at the 1960 Summer Olympics.
