= Ian Elliott =

British rower

Personal information
- Nationality: British
- Born: 11 January 1938 (age 88) Birmingham, England

Sport
- Sport: Rowing

Ian Lea Elliott (born 11 January 1938) is a British rower. He competed in the men's eight event at the 1960 Summer Olympics.
