= Frank Schepke =

German rower (1935–2017)

Personal information
- Born: 5 April 1935 Königsberg, Germany
- Died: 4 April 2017 (aged 81) Kiel, Schleswig-Holstein, Germany
- Height: 198 cm (6 ft 6 in)
- Weight: 95 kg (209 lb)
- Relatives: Kraft Schepke (brother)

Sport
- Sport: Rowing
- Club: ATV Ditmarsia Kiel
Medal record
Men's rowing
Olympic Games
Representing Germany
Gold medal – first place	1960 Rome	Eight
European Rowing Championships
Representing West Germany
Gold medal – first place	1959 Mâcon	Eight
Gold medal – first place	1961 Prague	Coxed four

Frank Schepke (5 April 1935 – 4 April 2017) was a German rower who competed for the United Team of Germany in the 1960 Summer Olympics.

He was born in Königsberg, Germany, in 1935. Kraft Schepke (1934–2023) was his brother.

At the 1959 European Rowing Championships in Mâcon, he won a gold medal with the eight. At the 1960 Summer Olympics, he was a crew member of the German eight that won gold. At the 1961 European Rowing Championships in Prague, he won a gold medal with the coxed four. He was twice—in 1959 and in 1960—awarded the Silbernes Lorbeerblatt (Silver Laurel Leaf), the highest West German sports award.

Both he and his brother retired after the 1961 rowing season from competitive rowing. In the same year, he finished his PhD at the University of Kiel in agricultural sciences. He worked as a consultant for farmers, and later in life founded an industrial cleaning company. Aged 55, he fulfilled his lifelong dream of owning his own farm, and he produced biologically grown produce.

He stood in the 1965 West German federal election in the Stormarn – Herzogtum Lauenburg electorate for the National Democratic Party of Germany, a far-right and ultranationalist party founded the previous year. He left the party in 1969. At the 2009 and 2013 German federal elections, he stood as an independent in the Plön – Neumünster electorate. Schepke was the initiator in 2004 behind a regional currency KannWas for Schleswig-Holstein.

Schepke died on 4 April 2017 in Kiel.
