= Kraft Schepke =

German rower (1934–2023)

Kraft Schepke OLY
Personal information
- Born: 3 March 1934 Königsberg, Germany
- Died: 12 November 2023 (aged 89) Laboe, Schleswig-Holstein, Germany
- Height: 190 cm (6 ft 3 in)
- Weight: 89 kg (196 lb)
- Relatives: Frank Schepke (brother)

Sport
- Sport: Rowing
- Club: ATV Ditmarsia Kiel
Medal record
Men's rowing
Olympic Games
Representing Germany
Gold medal – first place	1960 Rome	Eight
European Rowing Championships
Representing West Germany
Gold medal – first place	1958 Poznań	Coxless four
Gold medal – first place	1959 Mâcon	Eight
Gold medal – first place	1961 Prague	Coxed four

Kraft Schepke (3 March 1934 – 12 November 2023) was a German rower who competed for the United Team of Germany in the 1960 Summer Olympics.

== Biography ==
Schepke was born in Königsberg, Germany, in 1934. Frank Schepke (1935–2017) was his brother and they both competed for West Germany.

At the 1958 European Rowing Championships in Poznań, he won a gold medal with the coxless four. At the 1959 European Rowing Championships in Mâcon, he won a gold medal with the eight. At the 1960 Summer Olympics, he was a crew member of the German eight that won gold. At the 1961 European Rowing Championships in Prague, he won a gold medal with the coxed four.

Both he and his brother retired after the 1961 rowing season from competitive rowing. Kraft Schepke then worked for the State Sports Federation of Lower Saxony.

Schepke died in Laboe, Schleswig-Holstein on 12 November 2023, at the age of 89.
