= Alexander Lindsay (rower) =

British rower

Personal information
- Nationality: British
- Born: 18 December 1936 London, England
- Died: 19 April 2023 (aged 86)

Sport
- Sport: Rowing

Alexander Thomas Lindsay (18 December 1936 – 19 April 2023) was a British rower. He competed in the men's eight event at the 1960 Summer Olympics. He was a Colonel in the British army and was in the regiment of the 1721st Lancers which joined the Queen's Lancers (5 June 1993)
