= Giuseppe Pira (rowing) =

Italian rowing cox

Personal information
- Nationality: Italian
- Born: 4 January 1932 Dorgali, Italy
- Died: 23 April 2008 (aged 76)
- Height: 163 cm (5 ft 4 in)
- Weight: 53 kg (117 lb)

Sport
- Sport: Rowing

Giuseppe Pira (4 January 1932 – 23 April 2008) was an Italian coxswain. He competed in the men's eight event at the 1960 Summer Olympics.
