= Robert Wilson (American rower) =

American rower

Personal information
- Nationality: American
- Born: October 9, 1939 (age 86) Ridley Park, Pennsylvania, United States

Sport
- Sport: Rowing

Robert Wilson (born October 9, 1939) is an American rower. He competed in the men's eight event at the 1960 Summer Olympics.
