= Jean-Louis Bellet =

French rower

Personal information
- Born: 5 June 1932 Paris, France
- Died: 25 February 2023 (aged 90) Le Mesnil-en-Thelle, France
- Height: 180 cm (5 ft 11 in)
- Weight: 80 kg (176 lb)

Sport
- Sport: Rowing
Medal record
Men's rowing
Representing France
World Rowing Championships
Bronze medal – third place	1962 Lucerne	Eight
European Rowing Championships
Bronze medal – third place	1961 Prague	Eight

Jean-Louis Bellet (5 June 1932 – 25 February 2023) was a French rower. He competed at the 1960 Summer Olympics in Rome with the men's eight where they came fourth.
