= Nazzareno Simonato =

Italian rower (1936–2023)

Personal information
- Nationality: Italian
- Born: 24 April 1936 Vigonza, Italy
- Died: 26 October 2023 (aged 87) Padova, Italy

Sport
- Sport: Rowing

Nazzareno Simonato (24 April 1936 – 26 October 2023) was an Italian rower. He competed in the men's eight event at the 1960 Summer Olympics. Simonato died in Padova on 26 October 2023, at the age of 87.
