= Christian Puibaraud =

French rower (1938–2023)

Personal information
- Born: 21 February 1938 Courbevoie, France
- Died: 17 August 2023 (aged 85) Dax, Landes, France
- Height: 178 cm (5 ft 10 in)
- Weight: 72 kg (159 lb)

Sport
- Sport: Rowing
Medal record
Men's rowing
Representing France
World Rowing Championships
Bronze medal – third place	1962 Lucerne	Eight
European Rowing Championships
Bronze medal – third place	1961 Prague	Eight

Christian Puibaraud (21 February 1938 – 17 August 2023) was a French rower. He competed at the 1960 Summer Olympics in Rome with the men's eight where they came fourth.
