= Joe Baldwin =

American rower

Personal information
- Born: November 16, 1938 (age 87) Long Beach, California, United States

Sport
- Sport: Rowing

Joe Baldwin (born November 16, 1938) is an American rower. He competed in the men's eight event at the 1960 Summer Olympics.
