= Jean Ledoux =

French rower (1935–2019)

Personal information
- Nationality: French
- Born: 25 April 1935; Beauchamp, France
- Died: 30 January 2019 (aged 83)

Sport
- Sport: Rowing

Jean Ledoux (25 April 1935 – 30 January 2019) was a French rower. He competed in the men's eight event at the 1960 Summer Olympics.
