= Boris Gorokhov =

Soviet rower

Personal information
- Born: 2 November 1939 (age 85); Leningrad, Soviet Union
- Height: 181 cm (5 ft 11 in)
- Weight: 78 kg (172 lb)

Sport
- Sport: Rowing

Boris Gorokhov (Russian name: Борис Горохов; born 2 November 1939) is a Soviet rower. He competed at the 1960 Summer Olympics in Rome with the men's eight where they were eliminated in the heats.
