= Joe Mullins (military) =

British soldier and evangelical minister

Joe Mullins MC (July 16, 1920 – December 2, 2023) was a British soldier and evangelical minister.

== Early life and education ==
Joe Mullins was born at Chevington Grove near Bury St Edmunds, Suffolk, in 1920. He was the only son among three children. His father was a chartered accountant in Sudan. Mullins attended Marlborough College, where he became an evangelical Christian at 17 after attending a Scripture Union camp.

== Career ==
Following his education at Marlborough, Mullins worked on his uncle's farm in Kenya. When World War II began, he returned to Britain and enlisted in the 5th Battalion, Scots Guards. Later, Mullins then joined the Royal Military College, Sandhurst, and was commissioned into The Queen's Royal Regiment, serving in India.

Mullins served in the Japanese invasion of Burma in 1942 with Slim's 14th Army, participating in the Battle of Kohima in 1944. He was awarded the Military Cross during his service. After the war, he studied theology at Trinity College, Oxford, and received pastoral training at Ridley Hall, Cambridge.

Mullins was ordained and served a curacy in London before returning to India in 1952 with the Children's Special Service Mission.

From 1962 to 1974, Mullins was priest-in-charge of St John's in Bangalore. He later moved to Australia, where he served as senior minister at St Peter's in Weston, Canberra, and St Nicholas' in Goulburn, New South Wales. He retired in 1984 but continued his ministry, including roles in Jakarta and Paris, and missionary work in Kazakhstan.
