= Abdel Sattar Abdel Hadj =

Egyptian rower (born 1936)

Personal information
- Nationality: Egyptian
- Born: 1936 (age 88–89)

Sport
- Sport: Rowing

Abdel Sattar Abdel Hadj (born 1936) is an Egyptian rower. He competed in the 1960 Summer Olympics in the men's eight event.
