= Judith McHale (swimmer) =

Canadian swimmer

Personal information
- National team: Canada
- Born: Judith McHale; October 8, 1942 London, Ontario, Canada
- Died: August 23, 1995 (aged 52)
- Height: 5 ft 8.5 in (174 cm)
- Weight: 139 lb (63 kg)

Sport
- Sport: Swimming
- Strokes: Butterfly; Backstroke

Judith McHale (October 8, 1942 – August 23, 1995) was a Canadian competitive swimmer who competed at the 1960 Summer Olympics in Rome. She participated in breaststroke and relay events and was part of Canada’s women’s 4×100 metre medley relay team. The team finished eighth in the final.

== Competitive career ==
McHale competed internationally for Canada during the late 1950s and early 1960s in breaststroke and medley events. At the 1960 Summer Olympics, she placed 24th in the women’s 200 metre breaststroke and swam in the 4×100 metre medley relay, with the Canadian team finishing eighth overall.

== Personal life ==
In 1965, McHale married Richard Dale Birk. The couple had three children. She died from complications related to breast cancer on August 23, 1995.

== See also ==
- Swimming at the 1960 Summer Olympics
