= Åke Berntsson =

Swedish rower

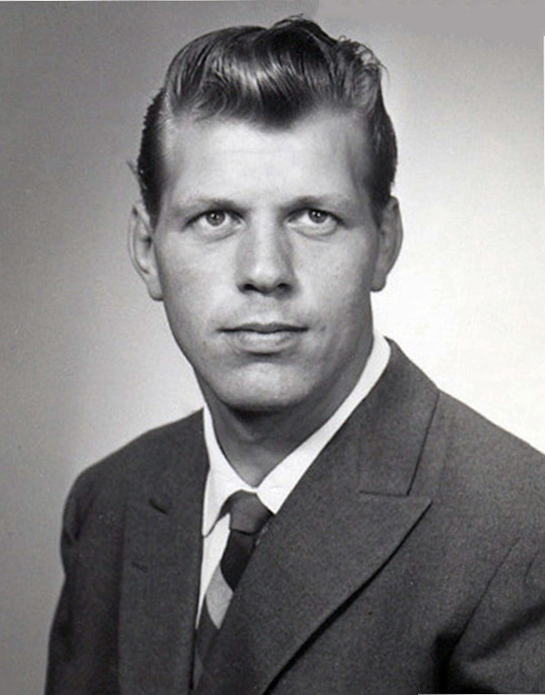

Personal information
- Full name: Åke Bertil Sixten Berntsson
- Born: 11 June 1934 Ljung, Sweden
- Died: 7 June 2016 (aged 81)

Sport
- Sport: Rowing
- Club: Uddevalla Roddklubb

Åke Bertil Sixten Berntsson (also Berndtsson, 11 June 1934 – 7 June 2016) was a Swedish rower. He competed in the eights at the 1960 Summer Olympics, but failed to reach the final.
