= Abdallah Gazi =

Egyptian rower

Personal information
- Nationality: Egyptian
- Born: 1936 (age 88–89)

Sport
- Sport: Rowing

Abdallah Gazi (born 1936) is an Egyptian rower. He competed in the men's eight event at the 1960 Summer Olympics.
