= Yosuke Tazaki =

Japanese rower (born 1939)

Personal information
- Nationality: Japanese
- Born: 16 February 1939 (age 86); Ibaraki, Japan

Sport
- Sport: Rowing

Yosuke Tazaki (born 16 February 1939) is a Japanese rower. He competed in the men's eight event at the 1960 Summer Olympics.
