= Tetsuzo Hirose =

Japanese rower (born 1939)

Personal information
- Nationality: Japanese
- Born: 28 December 1939 (age 85); Fukushima, Japan

Sport
- Sport: Rowing

Tetsuzo Hirose (born 28 December 1939) is a Japanese rower. He competed in the men's eight event at the 1960 Summer Olympics.
