= Hironori Itsuki =

Japanese rower (born 1940)

Personal information
- Nationality: Japanese
- Born: 30 October 1940 (age 84); Tokoya, Japan

Sport
- Sport: Rowing

Hironori Itsuki (born October 30, 1940) is a Japanese rower. He competed in the men's eight event at the 1960 Summer Olympics.
