= Swan River Rowing Club =

Rowing club in Perth, Western Australia

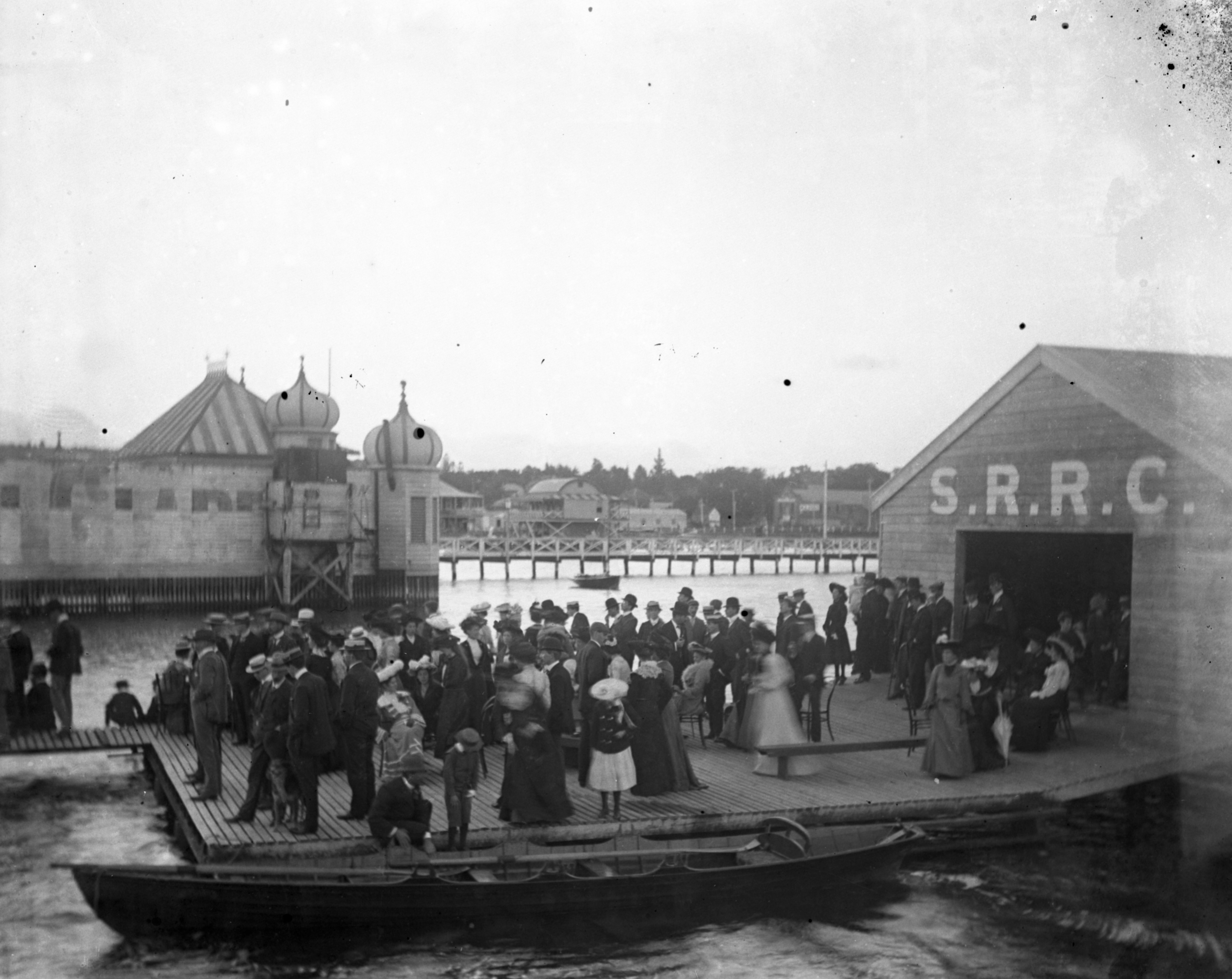
The club's Barrack Street shed in about 1910, with Perth City Baths in the background.

The Swan River Rowing Club is a rowing club that was founded in 1887 in Perth, Western Australia. It has had rowing sheds at different locations on the Swan River.

The Canning River was a location of regattas and social events for the club. In early years regattas were held to increase interest and membership. Social activities were an important part of the annual events.

Rivalry and differences with the West Australian Rowing Club were evident in early years of operation.

In 1943 the American Red Cross took over the clubhouse (at the bottom of Barrack Street) and converted it for use as an entertainment venue for Allied troops. New flooring was installed, and a reading room, library, and lounge created. The cost for the renovations was £2,000, equivalent to A$160,300 in 2022, and the club was officially opened by Governor Mitchell; it was called the American Red Cross Service Club.
