= Hans-Ulrich Dürst =

Swiss swimmer (born 1939)

Personal information
- Born: 22 January 1939 (age 87) Abidjan, Ivory Coast

Sport
- Sport: Swimming

Hans-Ulrich Dürst (born 22 January 1939) is a Swiss former freestyle swimmer. He competed in three events at the 1960 Summer Olympics.
