= José Almandoz =

Spanish rower

Personal information
- Nationality: Spanish
- Born: 16 January 1938; San Sebastián, Spain
- Died: 4 March 2013 (aged 75); San Sebastián, Spain

Sport
- Sport: Rowing

José Almandoz (16 January 1938 – 4 March 2013) was a Spanish rower. He competed in the men's eight event at the 1960 Summer Olympics.
