= John Rosser (cricketer) =

Australian cricketer

Personal information
- Born: 22 April 1862; Fremantle, Australia
- Died: 25 December 1925 (aged 63); Toowoomba, Australia

Domestic team information
- Years: Team
- 1882-1883: Victoria
- Source: Cricinfo, 23 July 2015

John Rosser (22 April 1862 – 25 December 1925) was an Australian cricketer. He played four first-class cricket matches for Victoria between 1882 and 1883.

== See also ==
- List of Victoria first-class cricketers
