= José Leiceaga =

Spanish rower (born 1934)

Personal information
- Nationality: Spanish
- Born: 25 October 1934 (age 90); San Sebastián, Spain

Sport
- Sport: Rowing

José Leiceaga Echazarreta (born 25 October 1934) is a Spanish rower. He competed in the men's eight event at the 1960 Summer Olympics.
