= Ralph Hurtig =

Swedish rower

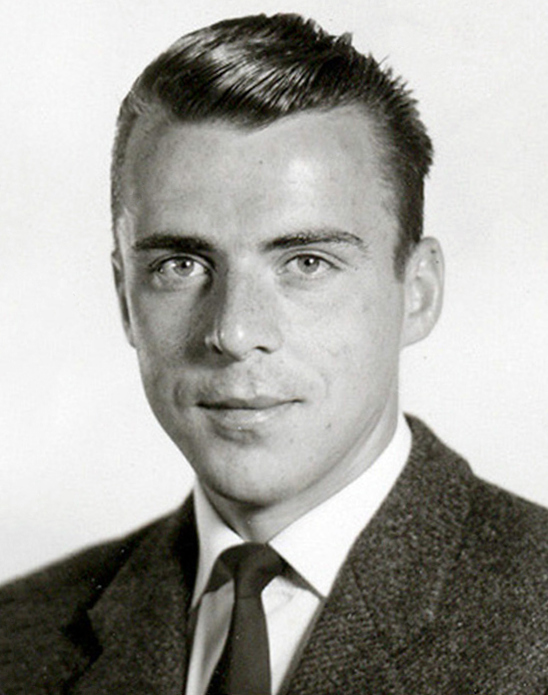

Personal information
- Born: 6 May 1932 Gothenburg, Sweden
- Died: 23 November 2017 (aged 85)

Sport
- Sport: Rowing
- Club: Göteborgs RK

Ralph Uno Hurtig (6 May 1932 – 23 November 2017) was a Swedish rower. He competed in the eights at the 1960 Summer Olympics, but failed to reach the final. His son Pär also became an Olympic rower.
