= Bengt-Åke Bengtsson =

Swedish rower (born 1938)

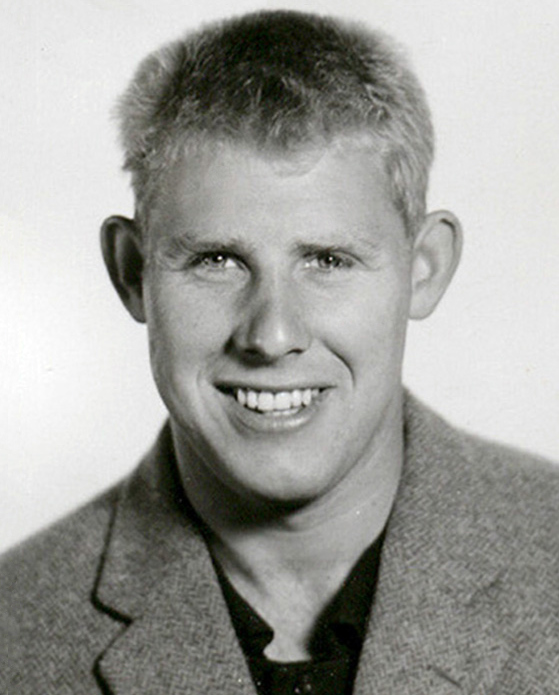

Personal information
- Born: 1 February 1938 (age 88) Gothenburg, Sweden

Sport
- Sport: Rowing
- Club: Göteborgs RK

Bengt-Åke Bengtsson (born 1 February 1938) is a retired Swedish rower. He competed in the eights at the 1960 Summer Olympics, but failed to reach the final.
