= Walter Osterwalder =

Swiss rower

Personal information
- Nationality: Swiss
- Born: 20 August 1934; Rapperswil, Switzerland
- Died: 9 February 2016 (aged 81)

Sport
- Sport: Rowing

Walter Osterwalder (20 August 1934 – 9 February 2016) was a Swiss rower. He competed in the men's eight event at the 1960 Summer Olympics.
