= Václav Pavkovič =

Czech rower (1936–2019)

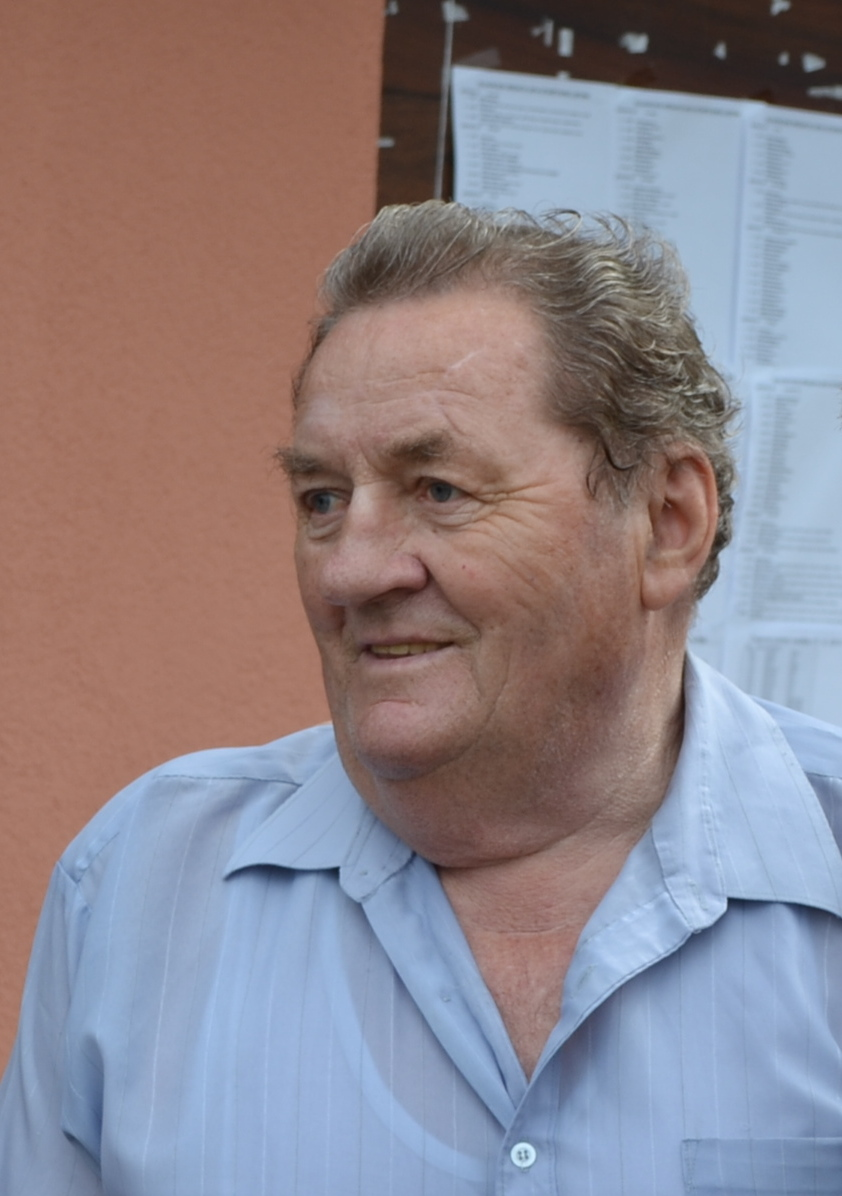
- Václav Pavkovič

Personal information
- Born: 24 April 1936 Břeclav, Czechoslovakia
- Died: 17 November 2019 (aged 83) Břeclav, Czech Republic

Sport
- Sport: Rowing
Medal record
Men's rowing
Representing Czechoslovakia
Bronze medal – third place	1960 Rome	Eight

Václav Pavkovič (24 April 1936 in Břeclav – 17 November 2019) was a Czech rower who competed for Czechoslovakia in the 1960 Summer Olympics when he was a crew member of the Czechoslovak boat which won the bronze medal in the eights event.
