= Hiroyuki Misawa =

Japanese rower (born 1938)

Personal information
- Nationality: Japanese
- Born: 27 March 1938 (age 87); Tokyo, Japan

Sport
- Sport: Rowing

Hiroyuki Misawa (born 27 March 1938) is a Japanese rower. He competed in the men's eight event at the 1960 Summer Olympics.
