= Taha Hassouba =

Egyptian rower (born 1925)

Personal information
- Nationality: Egyptian
- Born: 1925 Ad-Daqahliyah, Kingdom of Egypt

Sport
- Sport: Rowing

Taha Hassouba (born 1925) was an Egyptian rower. He competed in the men's eight event at the 1960 Summer Olympics.
