= Hiroshi Saito (rower) =

Japanese rower (born 1937)

Personal information
- Nationality: Japanese
- Born: 30 November 1937 (age 87); Tokyo, Japan

Sport
- Sport: Rowing

Hiroshi Saito (斎藤 宏, Saitō Hiroshi, born 30 November 1937) is a Japanese rower. He competed in the men's eight event at the 1960 Summer Olympics.
