= Walter Schröder =

German rower (1932–2022)

Personal information
- Born: 29 December 1932 Utecht, Mecklenburg-Schwerin, Germany
- Died: 18 October 2022 (aged 89) Glinde, Schleswig-Holstein, Germany

Sport
- Sport: Rowing
Medal record
Men's rowing
Representing Germany
Olympic Games
Gold medal – first place	1960 Rome	Eight
Representing West Germany
European Rowing Championships
Gold medal – first place	1959 Mâcon	Eight

Walter Schröder (29 December 1932 – 18 October 2022) was a German rower who competed for the United Team of Germany in the 1960 Summer Olympics. In 1960, he was a crew member of the West German boat which won the gold medal in the eights event. In 1959 they had won already the European Championships. After his career as rower he finished his physical education studies, researched and published extensively mainly on rowing and motor learning. He was hired by the University of Hamburg, where he moved up from rowing instructor to Associate Professor for movement studies. Into his section of the department he brought other former athletes, e.g. Arnd Krüger.
