= Hans Lenk =

German rower (1935–2024)

Personal information
- Born: 23 March 1935 Berlin, Germany
- Died: 30 July 2024 (aged 89) Karlsruhe, Baden-Württemberg, Germany

Sport
- Sport: Rowing
Medal record
Men's rowing
Representing Germany
Olympic Games
Gold medal – first place	1960 Rome	Eight
Representing West Germany
European Rowing Championships
Gold medal – first place	1958 Poznań	Coxless four
Gold medal – first place	1959 Mâcon	Eight

Hans Lenk (23 March 1935 – 30 July 2024) was a German rower who competed for the United Team of Germany in the 1960 Summer Olympics, and an Emeritus Professor of Philosophy. He was born in Berlin.

In 1960, he was a crew member of the West German boat that won the gold medal in the eights event.

== Life and career ==
Full Professor 1969–2003 (Karlsruhe Institute of Technology, KIT = University of Karlsruhe, Germany), then Emeritus. President 2005–2008 (then Honorary President) of the International Institute of Philosophy (I.I.P.), Paris, (i.e., the world academy of philosophers). President of the German Philosophical Society 1991–1993, Vice President 1998–2003 of the International Federation of Philosophical Societies (Fédération Internationale des Sociétés de Philosophie, FISP).

Visiting and honorary professorships in Argentina; Austria; Brazil, Chile, Hungary, India, Japan, Norway, Russia, Switzerland, Venezuela and the United States, incl. distinguished ones at University of Illinois 1973, University of Massachusetts 1976, TCU, Texas, 1987.

Studies in mathematics, philosophy, sport science (physical edu.) at the University of Freiburg, 1955–7, and until 1961 at the University of Kiel.(there also sociology and psychology), advanced studies in cybernetics, Technische Universität Berlin. – Dr. phil. = PhD at Kiel Univ. 1961. His Dissertation on the modern Olympic Games has been the first comprehensive social philosophical study of the modern Olympics in the social sciences. Habilitations (advanced doctorates) at the Technische Universität Berlin 1966 (in philosophy) and 1969 (for sociology), Assoc. Prof. 1969. – Full Professor at Karlsruhe Univ. 1969–2003. Dean of the School of Humanities and Social Sciences 1973–5. Dean 1993–2006 of the European Faculty (now European Academy) of Land Use and Development.

Lenk started out with the philosophy of science and the foundation of logics (notably his habilitation thesis on the Critique of Logical Constants, 1968) and later on, since 1978, included epistemology and pragmatic methodology of the social and natural sciences, technology+ economics, neuroscience and the philosophy of language in several books on Interpretative Constructs (1993) and Schema Games (1995). Since 1978 he developed his basic epistemological methodology of what he calls “methodological (scheme-)interpretationism” focused on a pragmatic and constructive realism a bit similar to Putnam's internal realism and much earlier and more general than the according recent perspectivism in US philosophy of science. Since then he extended and differentiated Wittgenstein’s later conception of “language games” toward “schema games” connecting and activating these with neuroscientific findings and analyses (for neurophilosophy cf. his book Consciousness as Scheme-Interpretation 2004).

In applied philosophy he published rather many studies and books on performance and achievement (not only in sport), social responsibility (see, e.g., Mitcham's Encyclopedia on Science, Technology and Ethics (2005, 2015 2nd ed.)), and social philosophy of technology. Lately, he turned to several books on Concrete Humanity 1988 and sustainability 2009 and Philosophical Anthropology 2010, 2013. Lenk's autobiographical memorial recollections on Ratzeburger Goldwasser (Ratzeburg’s Golden Waters) 2013 and Golden Day at Lago Albano 2015 present a lively overview of his athletic and academic career stages (except the three US visiting professorships).

Lenk's academic specializations comprise amongst others: epistemology, methodology and philosophy of science, incl. social sciences and technology, systems theory, neurosciences, anthropology, theoretical sociology, action theory, philosophy and psychology of creativity, achievement motivation and group dynamics, neuro- and moral philosophy as well as applied ethics, sport science and philosophy of sport.

Lenk died in Karlsruhe, Baden-Württemberg on 30 July 2024, at the age of 89.

== (Honorary) memberships in societies/committees ==
=== Professional societies/committees ===
- Founding president of the bilateral Philosophical Societies with Argentina, Chile, Hungary (−2005), Romania, and the German-Russian Society of the Philosophy of Science and Technology
- Founding member 1972 and President (1980–1) of the International Association of Sport Philosophy.
- Associate Fellow, American Academy of Physical Education (now known as the National Academy of Kinesiology), USA, 1983.
- Member of the Steering Committee member of FISP 1994–2008
- 2003 Member of the Russian Academy of Science, Moscow
- Member of the International Academy for the Philosophy of the Sciences 1995
- Internat. Academy for Philosophy 2010
- and the International Institute of Philosophy/Paris (I.I.P.) 1994
- German UNESCO Commission 1983–91
- Honorary membership: 2008 (as Hon. Pres.) of the International Institute of Philosophy
- Honorary membership: German Philos. Society
- Honorary membership: Philosophy Section of the Romanian Academy
- Honorary membership: World Academy of Letters

=== Sports societies/committees ===
- Honorary membership: International Olympic Academy
- Honorary membership: German Rowing Federation
- German Olympic Committee 1965–93
- honorary memberships in various rowing clubs.

== Sport achievements ==
4 German, 9 University and 2 European Championships in rowing (4-, 8+) 1958–60, Olympic Goldmedalist in the eight oar crew (8+) 1960 (Rome Olympics). Co-founder and coach of 3 German Championships (4+, 8+), 1 European silver medal (4+) and one World Championship (8+, 1966).

== Awards and honors (selection) ==
- Silver Laurel Leaf of the Federal President of Germany 1959, 1960
- Scientific Diem Plaque 1962
- Sievert-Prize (Olympians International) 1972/3
- Noel Baker Research Prize (UNESCO) 1978
- Outstanding Academic Book Award (USA) 1979
- Elected an Associate Fellow of the prestigious American Academy of Physical Education (now known as the National Academy of Kinesiology), USA, 1983.
- Commander's Cross (Großes Verdienstkreuz) from the President of the Federal Republic of Germany 2005
- Ethics Prize from the German Olympic Sports Federation 2010
- International Plato Award 2010
- Hall of Fame of the German Sport 2012
- Distinguished Scholar Award of the International Assoc. for the Philosophy of Sport 1995
- 8 honorary doctor degrees: Cologne 1986 (Sports U.), Córdoba/Arg. 1992 (Nat. U., twice = from 2 depts.), Moscow 1995 (GUGN) and IUÖP 2001, Budapest 1993 (TU), Pecs 1994 (dist., Rostov/Don 2002)
- 5 honorary or distinguished professorships abroad (US, Russia, Hungary, Chile).

== Publications ==
=== Overview ===
Lenk is the author of about 2500 articles and almost 150 books, incl. in Engl., a.o., Global TechnoScience and Responsibility 2007, Grasping Reality 2003, Save Olympic Spirit 2012, Social Philosophy of Athletics 1979, Team Dynamics 1977, Comparative and Intercultural Philosophy (ed.) 2009, Kant Today (ed.) 2006, Land Development Strategies (co-ed.) 2009, Ethics Facing Globalization (co-ed.) 2006, Advances and Problems in the Philosophy of Technology (co-ed.) 1997 (US)+2001, Epistemological Issues in Classical Chinese Philosophy (co-ed.) 1993, (Translations of books/articles into 20 languages.)

=== Selected publications (in German) ===
- Kritik der logischen Konstanten. De Gruyter, Berlin/New York City, 1968, ISBN 3-11-002565-5
- Werte – Ziele – Wirklichkeit der modernen Olympischen Spiele (2nd Ed.). Hofmann, Schorndorf, 1972, ISBN 3-7780-4172-X
- Leistungssport – Ideologie oder Mythos? Kohlhammer Verlag, Stuttgart 1972, 1974 (2nd Ed.), ISBN 978-3-17-233041-0
- Pragmatische Philosophie. Hoffmann & Campe, Hamburg 1975, ISBN 978-3-455-09181-6
- Zur Sozialphilosophie der Technik. Suhrkamp, Frankfurt/M 1982 ISBN 978-3-518-28014-0
- Eigenleistung. Fromm, Osnabrück-Zürich, 1983, ISBN 978-3-7201-5164-1
- Die achte Kunst – Leistungssport – Breitensport. Fromm –Interfrom, Osnabrück-Zurich, 1985, ISBN 978-3-7201-5176-4
- Zwischen Wissenschaft und Ethik. Suhrkamp, Frankfurt a. M., 1992, ISBN 3-518-28580-7
- Interpretationskonstrukte. Zur Kritik der interpretatorischen Vernunft. Suhrkamp, Frankfurt a. M., 1993, ISBN 3-518-58152-X
- Philosophie und Interpretation. Suhrkamp, Frankfurt a. M., 1993, ISBN 3-518-28660-9
- Interpretation und Realität. Suhrkamp, Frankfurt a. M., 1995, ISBN 3-518-28779-6
- Schemaspiele. Suhrkamp, Frankfurt a. M., 1995, ISBN 3-518-58193-7
- Einführung in die angewandte Ethik – Verantwortlichkeit und Gewissen. Kohlhammer, Stuttgart, 1997, ISBN 978-3-17-014803-1
- Einführung in die Erkenntnistheorie. UTB (Fink), München, 1998, ISBN 3-8252-2005-2
- Konkrete Humanität. Suhrkamp, Frankfurt a. M., 1998, ISBN 3-518-28850-4
- Praxisnahes Philosophieren. Kohlhammer, Stuttgart, 1999, ISBN 3-17-015791-4
- Erfassung der Wirklichkeit, Königshausen & Neumann, Würzburg, 2000, ISBN 3-8260-1743-9
- Kreative Aufstiege. Zur Philosophie und Psychologie der Kreativität. Suhrkamp, Frankfurt a. M., 2000, ISBN 3-518-29056-8
- Albert Schweitzer: Ethik als konkrete Humanität. LIT, Münster, 2000, ISBN 3-8258-4826-4
- Das Denken und sein Gehalt. Oldenbourg, München, 2001, ISBN 3-486-56472-2
- Denken und Handlungsbindung, Karl Alber, Freiburg, 2001, ISBN 3-495-47989-9
- Kleine Philosophie des Gehirns. Wiss. Buchges. Primus, Darmstadt, 2001, ISBN 3-534-15057-0
- Erfolg oder Fairness? (2nd Ed.). LIT, Münster, 2010, ISBN 3-8258-6105-8
- Natur – Umwelt – Ethik (with M. Maring). LIT, Münster, 2003, ISBN 3-8258-6486-3
- Bewusstsein als Schemainterpretation. Mentis, Paderborn, 2004, ISBN 3-89785-372-8
- Verantwortung und Gewissen des Forschers. Studienverlag, Innsbruck, 2006, ISBN 3-7065-4211-0
- Bewusstsein, Kreativität und Leistung. Wiss. Buchgesellschaft, Darmstadt, 2007, ISBN 978-3-534-20461-8
- Das flexible Vielfachwesen. Einführung in die moderne philosophische Anthropologie zwischen Bio-, Techno- und Kulturwissenschaften. Velbrück Wiss., Weilerswist, 2010, ISBN 978-3-938808-59-7
- Ratzeburger Goldwasser – vom Lago Albano bis Lambarene. Projektverlag, Bochum/Freiburg, 2013, ISBN 978-3-89733-290-4
- Transkulturelle Logik – Universalität in der Vielfalt (with G. Paul). Projektverlag, Bochum/Freiburg, 2014, ISBN 978-3-89733-346-8
- Goldtag am Lago Albano. Projektverlag, Bochum/Freiburg, 2015, ISBN 978-3-89733-357-4

=== Originally English works (selection) ===
- Team Dynamics, Stipes, Champaign IL, 1977, ISBN 978-0-8756-3141-7
- Social Philosophy of Athletics: A Pluralistic and Practice-Oriented Philosophical Analysis of Top Level Amateur Sport. Stipes, Champaign IL, 1979, ISBN 978-0875631653
- Grasping Reality. World Scientific, Singapore, 2003, ISBN 978-981-238-024-1
- Global TechnoScience and Responsibility. LIT, Berlin, 2007, ISBN 978-3-8258-0392-6
- S.O.S. Save Olympic Spirit. Agon Sportverlag, Kassel, 2012, ISBN 978-3-89784-396-7
