= Willi Padge =

German rower (1943–2023)

Personal information
- Born: 4 October 1943 Mölln, Germany
- Died: 17 September 2023 (aged 79)

Sport
- Sport: Rowing
Medal record
Men's rowing
Representing Germany
Olympic Games
Gold medal – first place	1960 Rome	Eight
Representing West Germany
European Rowing Championships
Gold medal – first place	1959 Mâcon	Eight

Willi Padge (4 October 1943 – 17 September 2023) was a German rower who competed for the United Team of Germany in the 1960 Summer Olympics.

Padge was born in Mölln on 4 October 1943.

In 1960, he was the coxswain of the West German boat which won the gold medal in the eights event.

Willi Padge died on 17 September 2023, at the age of 79.
