= Hansruedi Scheller =

Swiss rower (1931–2007)

Personal information
- Born: 4 April 1931 Kilchberg, Switzerland
- Died: 15 October 2007 (aged 76)
- Height: 184 cm (6 ft 0 in)
- Weight: 78 kg (172 lb)

Sport
- Sport: Rowing
Medal record
Men's rowing
Representing Switzerland
European Rowing Championships
Gold medal – first place	1959 Mâcon	Coxless four

Hansruedi Scheller (4 April 1931 – 15 October 2007) was a Swiss rower. He competed at the 1960 Summer Olympics in Rome with the men's eight where they were eliminated in the round one repêchage. He also participated in orienteering and won seven national titles (four as an individual and three with teams).
