= Lyman S. Perry =

American rower (born 1938)

Lyman Spencer Abson Perry (born August 22, 1938) is an American award-winning residential architect, a member of the 1960 Olympic Rowing Team, rowing coach both at the United States Naval Academy 1964–65 and University of Pennsylvania 1967–68. He was president of the University Barge Club in Philadelphia and founded the Head of the Schuylkill Regatta.

== Early life ==
Lyman S. A. Perry, son of Lyman S. Perry (Navy First Team All American in 1918 and former athletic director), and was born in Long Beach California in 1938. He graduated from The Hill School in 1956 and the United States Naval Academy in 1960, and received a master's degree in architecture from the University of Pennsylvania in 1968. He served in the US Naval submarine service from 1960 to 1965 and selected by Admiral Rickover for the Nuclear Power Program in 1963. He was a design critic in both the graduate and the undergraduate studios at the University of Pennsylvania 1973–85. He founded Lyman Perry Architects, Ltd in 1973.

== Olympics ==
Perry was the stroke oar in the eight oared crew which participated in the 1960 Olympic Games in Rome, and was stroke of the US Naval Academy Varsity and Plebe crew teams 1956-60 In 1964 he stroked the College Boat Club of the University of Pennsylvania at the Olympic Rowing trials

== Awards/career ==
While at the University of Pennsylvania he was inducted into Tau Sigma Delta Honorary Society also received the Arthur Spayd Brooke Gold Medal Memorial Prize for excellence design for the three year graduate program and also the Warren Powers Laird Memorial Prize for Highest Honors in Architecture his first year. Over his 40-year mainly residential architectural practice, his work was widely published and he designed homes for many heads of more than 20 US corporations. Many of his projects were on the island of Nantucket and includes the Great Harbor Yacht Club and the Nantucket Golf Club. He was inducted into the New England Home Hall of Fame in 2012.
