= Shigemi Tamura =

Japanese rower (born 1938)

Personal information
- Nationality: Japanese
- Born: 20 July 1938 (age 86); Okayama, Japan

Sport
- Sport: Rowing

Shigemi Tamura (born 20 July 1938) is a Japanese rower. He competed in the men's eight event at the 1960 Summer Olympics.
