= Manfred Rulffs =

German rower

Personal information
- Born: 6 March 1935 Kiel, Germany
- Died: 15 January 2007 (aged 71) Ratzeburg, Germany

Sport
- Sport: Rowing
Medal record
Men's rowing
Representing Germany
Olympic Games
Gold medal – first place	1960 Rome	Eight
Representing West Germany
European Rowing Championships
Gold medal – first place	1958 Poznań	Coxless four
Gold medal – first place	1959 Mâcon	Eight

Manfred Rulffs (6 March 1935 – 15 January 2007) was a German rower who competed for the United Team of Germany in the 1960 Summer Olympics.

He was born in Kiel and died in Ratzeburg.

In 1960, he was a crew member of the West German boat that won the gold medal in the eights event.
