= José Ibarburu =

Spanish rower (1929–2018)

Personal information
- Nationality: Spanish
- Born: 21 February 1929; San Sebastián, Spain
- Died: 22 September 2018 (aged 89)

Sport
- Sport: Rowing

José Ibarburu (21 February 1929 – 22 September 2018) was a Spanish rower. He competed in the men's eight event at the 1960 Summer Olympics.
