= Ignacio Alcorta =

Spanish rower

Personal information
- Nationality: Spanish
- Born: 19 September 1937 San Sebastián, Spain
- Died: 28 February 2022 (aged 84)

Sport
- Sport: Rowing

Ignacio Alcorta (19 September 1937 – 28 February 2022) was a Spanish rower. He competed in the men's eight event at the 1960 Summer Olympics.
