= Ignacio Astigarraga =

Spanish cyclist (born 1936)

Personal information
- Born: 12 September 1936 (age 90) Durango, Spain

Cycling career
- Sport: Cycling

Ignacio Astigarraga (born 12 September 1936) is a Spanish former cyclist. He competed in the individual road race and team time trial events at the 1960 Summer Olympics.
