= Ibrahim Abdulhalim =

Egyptian rower

Personal information
- Full name: Ibrahim Mahmoud Abdulhalim
- Nationality: Egyptian
- Born: 1931 Bilbeis, Egypt
- Died: 4 September 1963 (aged 31–32) Dürrenäsch, Switzerland

Sport
- Sport: Rowing

Ibrahim Mahmoud Abdulhalim (1931 – 4 September 1963) was an Egyptian rower and police officer. He competed in the men's eight event at the 1960 Summer Olympics. He was killed in the crash of Swissair Flight 306.

He had graduated from the University of Cairo prior to his death.
