= Kimiko Ezaka =

Japanese swimmer (born 1943)

Personal information
- Born: 6 November 1943 (age 82) Aichi, Japan

Sport
- Sport: Swimming
- Strokes: freestyle, medley
Medal record
Representing Japan
Asian Games
Gold medal – first place	1962 Jakarta	4×100m freestyle relay

Kimiko Ezaka (江坂 君子, Ezaka Kimiko; born 6 November 1943) is a Japanese former swimmer. She competed at the 1960 Summer Olympics in the 400 metres freestyle and the 4×100 metres freestyle relay, and the 1964 Summer Olympics in the 400 metres individual medley, but did not reach the finals in any of her events.
