= Hans Graber =

Swiss rower

Personal information
- Nationality: Swiss
- Born: 18 June 1930; Zürich, Switzerland
- Died: 17 April 2008 (aged 77)

Sport
- Sport: Rowing

Hans Graber (18 June 1930 – 17 April 2008) was a Swiss rower. He competed in the men's eight event at the 1960 Summer Olympics.
