= Faustino Amiano =

Spanish rower (1944–2020)

Personal information
- Nationality: Spanish
- Born: 15 February 1944; San Sebastián, Spain
- Died: 1 December 2020 (aged 76)

Sport
- Sport: Rowing

Faustino Amiano (15 February 1944 – 1 December 2020) was a Spanish rower. He competed in the men's eight event at the 1960 Summer Olympics.
