= Osamu Ochiai =

Japanese sports shooter

Personal information
- Born: 8 September 1931 (age 94) Fukui, Japan

Sport
- Sport: Sports shooting

Osamu Ochiai (落合 治, Ochiai Osamu; born 8 September 1931) is a Japanese former sports shooter. He competed at the 1960 Summer Olympics and the 1964 Summer Olympics.
