= Manuel Ibarburu =

Spanish rower

Personal information
- Nationality: Spanish
- Born: 20 February 1937; San Sebastián, Spain
- Died: 22 September 2021 (aged 84)

Sport
- Sport: Rowing

Manuel Ibarburu (20 February 1937 – 22 September 2021) was a Spanish rower. He competed in the men's eight event at the 1960 Summer Olympics.
