= Gottfried Schär =

Swiss rower

Personal information
- Nationality: Swiss
- Born: 3 June 1936; Lucerne, Switzerland
- Died: 26 May 2021 (aged 84)

Sport
- Sport: Rowing

Gottfried Schär (3 June 1936 – 26 May 2021) was a Swiss rower. He competed in the men's eight event at the 1960 Summer Olympics.
