= José Aristegui =

Spanish rower (1928–2018)

José María Aristegui Isasa
Personal information
- Nationality: Spanish
- Born: 22 December 1928; San Sebastián, Spain
- Died: 29 January 2018 (aged 89); San Sebastián, Spain

Sport
- Sport: Rowing

José María Aristegui (22 December 1928 – 29 January 2018) was a Spanish rower. He competed in the men's eight event at the 1960 Summer Olympics.
