= Werner Kölliker =

Swiss rower

Personal information
- Nationality: Swiss
- Born: 23 January 1935 Wolfwil, Switzerland
- Died: 2005 (aged 70)

Sport
- Sport: Rowing

Werner Kölliker (23 January 1935 – 2005) was a Swiss rower. He competed in the men's eight event at the 1960 Summer Olympics.
