= Abdel Mohsen Saad =

Egyptian rower

Personal information
- Nationality: Egyptian
- Born: 31 December 1936 (age 88); Kafr As-Sayh, Egypt

Sport
- Sport: Rowing

Abdel Mohsen Saad (born 31 December 1936) is an Egyptian rower. He competed at the 1960 Summer Olympics and the 1964 Summer Olympics.
