= Karl Fridlin =

Swiss swimmer

Personal information
- Born: 19 May 1935 (age 91) Zug, Switzerland

Sport
- Sport: Swimming

Karl Fridlin (born 19 May 1935) is a Swiss former freestyle swimmer who competed in two events at the 1960 Summer Olympics. From 1969 until his retirement, he managed the family company J. C. Fridlin Gewürze Ltd., a Swiss producer of premium spices.
