= Lorne Loomer =

Canadian rower (1937–2017)

Personal information
- Nationality: Canadian
- Born: March 11, 1937
- Died: January 1, 2017 (aged 79)

Sport
- Sport: Rowing
Medal record
Men's rowing
Representing Canada
Olympic Games
Gold medal – first place	1956 Melbourne	Coxless four
Commonwealth Games
Gold medal – first place	1958 Cardiff	Eight

Lorne Kenneth Loomer (March 11, 1937 – January 1, 2017) was a Canadian competition rower and Olympic champion.

He received a gold medal in coxless fours at the 1956 Summer Olympics in Melbourne, together with Archibald MacKinnon, Walter D'Hondt and Donald Arnold. At the 1958 British Empire and Commonwealth Games, Loomer received a gold medal in eights.

== Awards ==
Loomer was inducted into the Canadian Olympic Hall of Fame in 1958. He was inducted into British Columbia Sports Hall of Fame in 1966, and into University of British Columbia Sports Hall of Fame in 1993, together with the other members of the Olympic gold team. The Greater Victoria Sports Hall of Fame inducted Loomer in 1994.

== Notes ==
=== Conflicting sources ===
Some sources list Loomer as a silver medallist in eights at the 1960 Summer Olympics in Rome, as a member of the Canadian team. However, according to other sources Loomer competed in coxless pairs, but was replaced by substitute David Anderson in the coxed eights.
