= Hubert Bächli =

Swiss cyclist

Personal information
- Born: 18 October 1938 (age 87) Ehrendingen, Switzerland

Cycling career
- Sport: Cycling

Hubert Bächli (born 18 October 1938) is a Swiss former cyclist. He competed in the individual road race and team time trial events at the 1960 Summer Olympics.
