= Nelson Kuhn =

Canadian rower

Olympic medal record

Men's rowing
Silver medal – second place	1960 Rome	Eight

Nelson Kuhn (born July 7, 1937) is a Canadian rower, born in Whitemouth, who competed in the 1960 Summer Olympics

During the 1960 Rome summer olympics 1960 he was a crew member of the Canadian boat which won the silver medal in the eights event.
