= Rainer Goltzsche =

Swiss swimmer

Personal information
- Born: 4 September 1936 (age 90) Zürich, Switzerland
- Died: 12. März 2023; Christchurch (Neuseelandl

Sport
- Sport: Swimming

Rainer Goltzsche (born 4 September 1936) is a Swiss former freestyle swimmer. He competed in two events at the 1960 Summer Olympics.
