= Glen Mervyn =

Canadian rower

Olympic medal record

Men's rowing
Silver medal – second place	1960 Rome	Eight

Glen Alexander Mervyn (February 17, 1937 – March 18, 2000) was a Canadian rower, Olympic medalist and Olympic coach. He won Canada's only medal at the 1960 Summer Olympics and coached the Canadian National Rowing Team at the 1964 Summer Olympics.

He was born in Vancouver. Mervyn was a member of the UBC/VRC eights team that won the gold medal at the 1958 British Empire Games in Wales. He was also with the eights team that competed at the Pan American Games in 1959. At the 1960 Rome Olympics, he was the stroke (Captain) of the Canadian boat that won the silver medal in the eights event. This was the only medal the Canadians won that year. Glen coached the Canadian National team at the 1964 Tokyo Olympics, where two of his rowers won a gold medal in the pairs event.

He graduated from University of British Columbia and Harvard University.
