= Mohamed Abdel Sami =

Egyptian rower

Personal information
- Nationality: Egyptian
- Born: 1936 (age 88–89)

Sport
- Sport: Rowing

Mohamed Abdel Sami (born 1936) is an Egyptian rower. He competed in the 1960 Summer Olympics.
