= Trimido Vaqueriza =

Spanish rower

Personal information
- Nationality: Spanish
- Born: 6 August 1929 (age 95); San Sebastián, Spain

Sport
- Sport: Rowing

Trimido Vaqueriza (born 6 August 1929) is a Spanish rower. He competed in the men's eight event at the 1960 Summer Olympics.
