= Tetsuo Sato (rower) =

Japanese rower (born 1938)

Personal information
- Nationality: Japanese
- Born: 23 September 1938 (age 86); Miyagi, Japan

Sport
- Sport: Rowing

Tetsuo Sato (佐藤 哲夫, Satō Tetsuo, born 23 September 1938) is a Japanese rower. He competed in the men's eight event at the 1960 Summer Olympics.
