= Bill McKerlich =

Canadian rower

Personal information
- Born: William Alister M. McKerlich; December 2, 1935 (age 90) Vancouver, British Columbia

Sport
- Sport: Rowing
Medal record
Men's rowing
Representing Canada
Olympic Games
Silver medal – second place	1956 Melbourne	Eight
Silver medal – second place	1960 Rome	Eight

William Alister M. McKerlich (born December 2, 1935) is a Canadian rower who competed in the 1956 Summer Olympics, the 1958 Commonwealth Games and in the 1960 Summer Olympics.

He was born in Vancouver, British Columbia. He is the father of Ian McKerlich, who competed as a member of the Canadian Pair with cox at the 1988 Summer Olympics in Seoul Korea.

In 1956 he was a crew member of the Canadian crew which won the silver medal in the eight oar event in Australia. In 1958 he was a member of the Gold Medal Canadian eight oar crew at the British Commonwealth Games in Wales. Two years later he won his second silver Olympic medal as captain of the Canadian crew in the eight oar competition in Rome.

Service: After his active rowing career Bill volunteered for many years in the sport of rowing as a coach, regatta organizer, co-founder of the Delta-Deas Rowing Club, and as a Canadian and International (FISA) rowing regatta referee.

Recipient: Rowing Canada Aviron Award of Merit: "for long and meritorious service to the sport of rowing"

Member: University of British Columbia Sports Hall of Fame, British Columbia Sports Hall of Fame, and the Canadian Olympic Sports Hall of Fame

Professional Career: Teacher, School Principal, director of Instruction, District School Superintendent. - Worked at two British Columbia Universities and after retiring, at Harvard University as a Visiting Practitioner.

Author: McKerlich, Bill, Twelve Steps to Reform Canadian Public Education, Trafford, 2002(ISBN 1-55369-766-9)
