= Sohen Biln =

Canadian rower (1939–2012)

Olympic medal record

Men's rowing
Silver medal – second place	1960 Rome	Eight

Sohen Biln (June 17, 1939 – March 27, 2012) was a Canadian rower who competed in the 1958 Commonwealth Games and 1960 Summer Olympics.

He was born in Westlock, Alberta.

In 1960 he was the coxswain of the Canadian boat which won the silver medal in the eights event. At the Commonwealth Games in 1958 he got a silver medal in the coxed fours.
