= Santiago Beitia =

Spanish rower

Personal information
- Nationality: Spanish
- Born: 28 December 1938 (age 86); San Sebastián, Spain

Sport
- Sport: Rowing

Santiago Beitia (born 28 December 1938) is a Spanish rower. He competed in the men's eight event at the 1960 Summer Olympics.
