= Kenro Chiba =

Japanese rower (born 1937)

Personal information
- Nationality: Japanese
- Born: 15 September 1937 (age 87); Iwate, Japan

Sport
- Sport: Rowing

Kenro Chiba (千葉 建郎, Chiba Kenrō, born 15 September 1937) is a Japanese rower. He competed in the men's eight event at the 1960 Summer Olympics.
