= Joe Mullins (athlete) =

Canadian athlete

Personal information
- Nationality: Canadian
- Born: 18 October 1937 (age 87)

Sport
- Sport: Sprinting
- Event(s): 800m, 1500m

Joe Mullins (born 18 October 1937) is a Canadian athlete. He competed at the 800 metres and the 1500 metres at the 1960 Summer Olympics.
