= Abdel Fattah Abou-Shanab =

Egyptian rower

Personal information
- Nationality: Egyptian
- Born: 15 October 1935 (age 89)

Sport
- Sport: Rowing

Abdel Fattah Abou-Shanab (born 15 October 1935) is an Egyptian rower. He competed in the 1960 and 1964 Summer Olympics.
