= Abbas Khamis =

Egyptian rower (1933–2019)

Personal information
- Nationality: Egyptian
- Born: 20 March 1933; Cairo, Egypt
- Died: December 2019 (aged 86)

Sport
- Sport: Rowing

Abbas Khamis (20 March 1933 – December 2019) was an Egyptian rower. He competed at the 1960 Summer Olympics and the 1964 Summer Olympics. Khamis died in December 2019, at the age of 86.
