= John Lecky (rower) =

Canadian rower (1940–2003)

Medal record

Men's rowing

Representing Canada

Olympic Games
| Silver medal – second place | 1960 Rome | Eight |

John MacMillan Stirling Lecky (29 August 1940 – 25 February 2003) was a Canadian sport rower. He was born in Vancouver, British Columbia. He competed at the 1960 Summer Olympics in Rome, where he won a silver medal in the men's eight with the Canadian team. He was in the winning Cambridge crews in the University Boat Race in 1962 and 1964.

Lecky was a member of the Executive Committee and Board of Directors for Calgary Olympic Organizing Committee of the 1988 Winter Olympics.
