= Walter D'Hondt =

Canadian rower (1936–2021)

Medal record

Men's rowing

Representing Canada

Olympic Games
Gold medal – first place	1956 Melbourne	Coxless four
Silver medal – second place	1960 Rome	Eight

Commonwealth Games
Gold medal – first place	1958 Cardiff	Eight
Silver medal – second place	1958 Cardiff	Coxed four

Walter Ignace d'Hondt (September 11, 1936 – December 13, 2021) was a Canadian rower and Olympic champion.

== Personal life ==
He was the brother of Miss Canada 1959, Danica d'Hondt, who is a Canadian-American-British actress, restaurateur, and author. He was the father of women's basketball player Gillian D'Hondt and the uncle of film actress, America Olivo.

D'Hondt died on December 13, 2021, at the age of 85, in Bellevue, Washington, due to complications following a fall.

== Career ==
He received a gold medal in coxless fours at the 1956 Summer Olympics in Melbourne, together with Archibald MacKinnon, Lorne Loomer and Donald Arnold.

At the 1958 British Empire and Commonwealth Games, D'Hondt received a gold medal in eights, and a silver medal in coxed fours. He received a silver medal in eights at the 1960 Summer Olympics in Rome, as a member of the Canadian team.

== Awards ==
D'Hondt was inducted into the Canadian Olympic Hall of Fame in 1958. He was inducted into British Columbia Sports Hall of Fame in 1966, and into University of British Columbia Sports Hall of Fame in 1993, together with the other members of the Olympic gold team.
