= Archibald MacKinnon =

Canadian rower (1937–2026)

Personal information
- Nickname: Archie
- Born: Archibald Alan MacKinnon; January 13, 1937 Cranbrook, British Columbia, Canada
- Died: August 28, 2026 (aged 89) Calgary, Alberta, Canada

Sport
- Country: Canada
- Sport: Rowing
Medal record
Men's rowing
Representing Canada
Olympic Games
Gold medal – first place	1956 Melbourne	Coxless four
Silver medal – second place	1960 Rome	Eight
Commonwealth Games
Gold medal – first place	1958 Cardiff	Eights

Archibald Alan MacKinnon (January 13, 1937 – August 28, 2026) was a Canadian competition rower and Olympic champion in 1956.

== Biography ==
Born in Cranbrook, British Columbia on January 13, 1937, MacKinnon rowed at the University of British Columbia starting in 1955, qualifying for the 1956 Summer Olympics in Melbourne, Australia.

He won a gold medal in coxless fours at the 1956 Games, together with Lorne Loomer, Walter D'Hondt and Donald Arnold.

At the 1958 British Empire and Commonwealth Games, MacKinnon won a gold medal in eights. He also won a silver medal in eights at the 1960 Summer Olympics in Rome, Italy, as a member of the Canadian team.

MacKinnon died in Calgary, Alberta on August 28, 2026, at the age of 89.

== Awards ==
MacKinnon was inducted into the Canada's Sports Hall of Fame in 1957. In 1966, he was inducted to the BC Sports Hall of Fame. He was also twice inducted into the University of British Columbia's Sports Hall of Fame, first in 1993 for the crew that won gold in Melbourne, and a second time in 2012 for the crew that won silver in Rome.
