= Saleh Ibrahim =

Egyptian rower

Personal information
- Nationality: Egyptian
- Born: 3 February 1936 (age 89); Dumyat, Egypt

Sport
- Sport: Rowing

Saleh Ibrahim (born 3 February 1936) is an Egyptian rower. He competed at the 1960 Summer Olympics and the 1964 Summer Olympics.
