= Donald Arnold =

Canadian rower (1935–2021)

Medal record

Men's rowing

Representing Canada

Olympic Games
Gold medal – first place	1956 Melbourne	Coxless four
Silver medal – second place	1960 Rome	Eight

Commonwealth Games
Gold medal – first place	1958 Cardiff	Eight
Silver medal – second place	1958 Cardiff	Coxed four

Donald John Arnold (July 14, 1935 – June 27, 2021) was a Canadian competition rower and Olympic champion. He was born in Kelowna, British Columbia.

He received a gold medal in coxless fours at the 1956 Summer Olympics in Melbourne, together with Archibald MacKinnon, Lorne Loomer and Walter D'Hondt.

At the 1958 British Empire and Commonwealth Games Arnold received a gold medal in eights, and a silver medal in coxed fours. He received a silver medal in eights at the 1960 Summer Olympics in Rome, as a member of the Canadian team. He died in North Vancouver, British Columbia at the age of 85 from heart failure in 2021.

== Awards ==
Arnold was inducted into the Canadian Olympic Hall of Fame in 1958. He was inducted into British Columbia Sports Hall of Fame in 1966, and into University of British Columbia Sports Hall of Fame in 1993, together with the other members of the Olympic gold team.
