= West Australian Rowing Club =

Rowing club in Perth, Western Australia

- Full name: West Australian Rowing Club (Incorporated)
- Sport: Rowing
- Founded: 1868
- Based in: Perth, Western Australia
- Colours: Cardinal and yellow
- President: Tavis Harling
- Head coach: Jack O'Dea
- Website: www.warowingclub.org

The West Australian Rowing Club is a rowing club based in Perth, Western Australia. The club has operated out of a boatshed next to Barrack Square since 1906.

== History ==
While the current club was incorporated in 1894, the club believes it has roots dating back to 1868. It was the first rowing club in Western Australia and is the last one remaining on the Perth city foreshore.

The club opened a boatshed next to Barrack Square in March 1906. The boatshed received a permanent listing on the Western Australian Register of Heritage Places in 2001.
