= Austria at the 1960 Summer Olympics =

- IOC code: AUT
- NOC: Austrian Olympic Committee

in Rome
- Competitors: 103 (82 men and 21 women) in 15 sports
- Flag bearer: Herbert Wiedermann
- Medals Ranked 18th: Gold 1 Silver 1 Bronze 0 Total 2

Summer Olympics appearances (overview)
- 1896; 1900; ~~1904~~; 1908; 1912; 1920; 1924; 1928; 1932; 1936; 1948; 1952; 1956; 1960; 1964; 1968; 1972; 1976; 1980; 1984; 1988; 1992; 1996; 2000; 2004; 2008; 2012; 2016; 2020; 2024; 2028

Other related appearances
- 1906 Intercalated Games

Austria competed at the 1960 Summer Olympics in Rome, Italy. 103 competitors, 82 men and 21 women, took part in 81 events in 15 sports.

== Medalists ==
| Medal | Name | Sport | Event |
|---|---|---|---|
| Gold | Hubert Hammerer | Shooting | Men's 300m Rifle Three Positions |
| Silver | Alfred Sageder; Josef Kloimstein | Rowing | Men's coxless pair |

== Boxing ==
Men's Bantamweight

- Peter Weiss (Note: also competed at the 1964 Summer Olympics) =9th

Men's Lightweight

- Josef Grumser =17th

Men's Light welterweight

- Rupert König =17th

Men's Welterweight

- Franz Koschina =17th

Men's Middleweight

- Egon Rusch =17th

== Cycling ==
Eight male cyclists represented Austria in 1960.

Individual road race

- Arnold Ruiner
- Kurt Postl
- Fritz Inthaler
- Kurt Schweiger

Team time trial

- Peter Deimböck
- Fritz Inthaler
- Kurt Postl
- Kurt Schweiger

1000m time trial

- Günther Kriz

Team pursuit

- Günther Kriz
- Peter Deimböck
- Kurt Garschal
- Kurt Schein

== Diving ==
Men

| Athlete | Event | Preliminary | | Semi-final | | | | Final | | | |
| Athlete | Event | Points | Rank | Points | Rank | Total | Rank | Points | Rank | Total | Rank |
|---|---|---|---|---|---|---|---|---|---|---|---|
| Peter Huber | 3 m springboard | 50.46 | 19 | Did not advance | | | | | | | |
| Kurt Mrkwicka | 3 m springboard | 53.12 | 11 Q | 37.61 | 16 | 90.73 | 15 | Did not advance | | | |
| Kurt Mrkwicka | 10 m platform | 55.13 | 3 Q | 36.24 | 14 | 91.37 | 9 | Did not advance | | | |

== Fencing ==
Nine fencers, five men and four women, represented Austria in 1960.

Men's sabre

- Helmuth Resch
- Günther Ulrich
- Josef Wanetschek

Men's team sabre

- Helmuth Resch, Paul Kerb, Hans Hocke, Günther Ulrich, Josef Wanetschek

Women's foil

- Traudl Ebert
- Maria Grötzer
- Helga Gnauer

Women's team foil

- Helga Gnauer, Traudl Ebert, Waltraut Peck-Repa, Maria Grötzer

== Modern pentathlon ==
Three male pentathlete represented Austria in 1960.

Individual

- Peter Lichtner-Hoyer
- Udo Birnbaum
- Frank Battig

Team

- Peter Lichtner-Hoyer
- Udo Birnbaum
- Frank Battig

== Rowing ==
Austria had 10 male rowers participate in four out of seven rowing events in 1960.

Men's single sculls

- Horst Fink

Men's double sculls

- Gottfried Dittrich
- Adolf Löblich

Men's coxless pair

- Alfred Sageder
- Josef Kloimstein

Men's coxed four

- Dieter Ebner
- Helmuth Kuttelwascher
- Horst Kuttelwascher
- Dieter Losert
- Wolfdietrich Traugott (cox)

== Sailing ==
Open

| Athlete | Event | Race | | | | | | | Net points | Final rank |
| Athlete | Event | 1 | 2 | 3 | 4 | 5 | 6 | 7 | Net points | Final rank |
|---|---|---|---|---|---|---|---|---|---|---|
| Carl Auteried; Harald Fereberger | Flying Dutchman | 13 | 24 | 8 | 17 | 11 | ~~DNF~~ | 8 | 2981 | 17 |
| Harald Musil; Franz Eisl | Star | 14 | 10 | 15 | 9 | 20 | ~~DNF~~ | 19 | 2240 | 15 |
| Gotfrid Köchert; Erich Moritz; Gerhard Huska | 5.5 Metre | 8 | 11 | 16 | 14 | 19 | ~~DNF~~ | 11 | 1664 | 17 |

== Shooting ==
Five shooters represented Austria in 1960. Hubert Hammerer won gold in the 300 m rifle, three positions event.

Men

| Athlete | Event | Qualification | | Final | |
| Athlete | Event | Score | Rank | Score | Rank |
|---|---|---|---|---|---|
| Josef Fröwis | 50 m rifle, three positions | 551 | 12 Q | 1134 | 9 |
| Josef Fröwis | 50 m rifle, prone | 378 | 31 | Did not advance | |
| Hubert Hammerer | 300 m rifle, three positions | 567 | 2 Q | 1129 | Gold medal |
| Hubert Hammerer | 50 m rifle, three positions | 562 | 3 Q | 1132 | 11 |
| Wilhelm Sachsenmaier | 300 m rifle, three positions | 561 | 6 Q | 1098 | 16 |
| Wilhelm Sachsenmaier | 50 m rifle, prone | 382 | 19 Q | 572 | 42 |
| Franz Sarnitz | Trap | 86 | 31 Q | 172 | 28 |
| Laszlo Szapáry | Trap | 89 | 17 Q | 182 | 10 |

== Swimming ==
Men

| Athlete | Event | Heat | | Semifinal | | Final | |
| Athlete | Event | Time | Rank | Time | Rank | Time | Rank |
|---|---|---|---|---|---|---|---|
| Gert Kölli | 100 m freestyle | 58.3 | =25 | Did not advance | | | |
| Helmut Ilk | 400 m freestyle | 4:58.1 | 35 | —N/a | | Did not advance | |
| Friedrich Suda | 100 m backstroke | 1:06.0 | =23 | Did not advance | | | |
| Gerald Brauner | 200 m breaststroke | DSQ | | Did not advance | | | |

Women

| Athlete | Event | Heat | | Semifinal | | Final | |
| Athlete | Event | Time | Rank | Time | Rank | Time | Rank |
|---|---|---|---|---|---|---|---|
| Nora Novotny | 100 m freestyle | 1:07.4 | 21 | Did not advance | | | |
| Sigrid Müller | 400 m freestyle | 5:25.1 | 19 | —N/a | | Did not advance | |
| Lore Trittner | 100 m backstroke | 1:20.8 | 28 | —N/a | | Did not advance | |
| Christl Filippovits | 200 m breaststroke | 3:02.6 | 20 | —N/a | | Did not advance | |
| Christl Wöber | 200 m breaststroke | 3:09.3 | 25 | —N/a | | Did not advance | |
| Hannelore Janele | 100 m butterfly | 1:18.4 | =20 | —N/a | | Did not advance | |
