= Cycling at the 1960 Summer Olympics – Men's team time trial =

Men's cycling team time trial at the Games of the XVII Olympiad
- Venue: Pacific Ocean Lane, Rome; 100.00 km (62.1 mi)
- Date: 26 August 1960
- Competitors: 126 from 32 nations
- Winning time: 2:14:33.53

Medalists
1st place, gold medalist(s)		Antonio Bailetti, Ottavio Cogliati, Giacomo Fornoni, Livio Trapè	Italy
2nd place, silver medalist(s)		Gustav-Adolf Schur, Egon Adler, Erich Hagen, Günter Lörke	Germany
3rd place, bronze medalist(s)		Viktor Kapitonov, Yevgeny Klevtsov, Yury Melikhov, Aleksei Petrov	Soviet Union

These are the official results of the Men's Team Time Trial at the 1960 Summer Olympics in Rome, Italy, held on 26 August 1960. There were 126 participants from 32 nations.

The event, which was held in extremely hot conditions, was marred by the death of Knud Enemark Jensen, who collapsed from sunstroke and suffered a fractured skull. It was later determined that before the race Jensen had taken Ronicol, a blood circulation stimulant.

== Final classification ==
Rank	Name	Nationality	Time
1st place, gold medalist(s)	Antonio Bailetti; Ottavio Cogliati; Giacomo Fornoni; Livio Trapè	Italy	2:14:33.53
2nd place, silver medalist(s)	Gustav-Adolf Schur; Egon Adler; Erich Hagen; Günter Lörke	United Team of Germany	2:16:56.31
3rd place, bronze medalist(s)	Viktor Kapitonov; Yevgeny Klevtsov; Yury Melikhov; Aleksei Petrov	Soviet Union	2:18:41.67
4	Jan Hugens; René Lotz; Ab Sluis; Lex van Kreuningen	Netherlands	2:19:15.71
5	Owe Adamson; Gunnar Göransson; Osvald Johansson; Gösta Pettersson	Sweden	2:19:36.37
6	Ion Cosma; Gabriel Moiceanu; Aurel Şelaru; Ludovic Zanoni	Romania	2:20:18.91
7	Henri Duez; François Hamon; Roland Lacombe; Jacques Simon	France	2:20:36.38
8	Ignacio Astigarraga; Juan Sánchez; José Antonio Momeñe; Ramón Sáez Marzo	Spain	2:21:34.59
9	Erwin Jaisli; Roland Zöffel; René Rutschmann; Hubert Bächli	Switzerland	2:22:09.63
10	Bogusław Fornalczyk; Wiesław Podobas; Jan Chtiej; Mieczysław Wilczewski	Poland	2:23:44.16
11	Bill Freund; Michael Hiltner; Wes Chowen; Bob Tetzlaff	United States	2:24:00.97
12	Ricardo Senn; Gabriel Niell; Federico Cortés; Pedro Simionato	Argentina	2:24:13.47
13	Peter Deimböck; Fritz Inthaler; Kurt Postl; Kurt Schweiger	Austria	2:24:33.92
14	Bill Bradley; William Holmes; Jim Hinds; Ken Laidlaw	Great Britain	2:24:59.02
15	Ivan Levačić; Veselin Petrović; Janez Žirovnik; Nevenko Valčić	Yugoslavia	2:25:35.15
16	Rubén Darío Gómez; Roberto Buitrago; Pablo Hurtado; Hernán Medina	Colombia	2:25:39.88
17	Boyan Kotsev; Dimitar Kotev; Ognyan Toshev; Stoyan Georgiev Demirev	Bulgaria	2:26:20.48
18	Benoni Beheyt; Willy Monty; Willy Vanden Berghen; Yvan Covent	Belgium	2:27:11.12
19	Mohamed Ben Mohamed; Mohamed Ghandora; Abdallah Lahoucine; Ahmed Omar	Morocco	2:27:41.35
20	Paul Nyman; Unto Hautalahti; Raimo Honkanen; Matti Herronen	Finland	2:27:47.68
21	Warren Scarfe; Garry Jones; Alan Grindal; Frank Brazier	Australia	2:29:43.54
22	Nico Pleimling; René Andring; Louis Grisius; Raymond Bley	Luxembourg	2:30:36.30
23	José Ferreira; Francisco Mujica; Arsenio Chirinos; Víctor Chirinos	Venezuela	2:30:52.30
24	Armando Martínez; Filiberto Mercado; Luis Zárate	Mexico	2:31:39.24
25	José Pacheco; Mário Silva; Francisco Valada; Ramiro Martins	Portugal	2:33:19.61
26	Sanusi; Rusli Hamsjin; Theo Polhaupessy; Hendrik Brocks	Indonesia	2:34:29.98
27	Bechir Mardassi; Mohamed Touati; Ali Ben Ali; Mohamed El-Kemissi	Tunisia	2:36:05.54
28	Guremu Demboba; Kouflu Alazar; Amousse Tessema; Negousse Mengistou	Ethiopia	2:38:34.08
29	John Bugeja; Paul Camilleri; Joseph Polidano	Malta	2:44:35.56
30	Pak Jong-hyeon; Lee Seung-hun; No Do-cheon; Jo Jae-hyeon	South Korea	2:53:09.51
AC	Knud Enemark Jensen; Vagn Bangsborg; Niels Baunsøe; Jørgen Jørgensen	Denmark	DNF
AC	Salvatore Palmucci; Sante Ciacci; Domenico Cecchetti; Vito Corbelli	San Marino	DNF
