= Boxing at the 1960 Summer Olympics =

Boxing at the Games of the XVII Olympiad

Italy dominated boxing at the 1960 Summer Olympics, winning three gold medals and seven medals overall. Two of the gold medalists would later become Hall of Fame world champions in professional boxing: American Cassius Clay (later known as Muhammad Ali) and Italian Nino Benvenuti.

== Medalists ==
Games	Gold	Silver	Bronze
Flyweight (−51 kg)	Gyula Török; Hungary	Sergey Sivko; Soviet Union	Abdel Moneim El-Guindi; Egypt
Flyweight (−51 kg)	Gyula Török; Hungary	Sergey Sivko; Soviet Union	Kiyoshi Tanabe; Japan
Bantamweight (−54 kg)	Oleg Grigoryev; Soviet Union	Primo Zamparini; Italy	Oliver Taylor; Australia
Bantamweight (−54 kg)	Oleg Grigoryev; Soviet Union	Primo Zamparini; Italy	Brunon Bendig; Poland
Featherweight (−57 kg)	Francesco Musso; Italy	Jerzy Adamski; Poland	Jorma Limmonen; Finland
Featherweight (−57 kg)	Francesco Musso; Italy	Jerzy Adamski; Poland	William Meyers; South Africa
Lightweight (−60 kg)	Kazimierz Paździor; Poland	Sandro Lopopolo; Italy	Richard McTaggart; Great Britain
Lightweight (−60 kg)	Kazimierz Paździor; Poland	Sandro Lopopolo; Italy	Abel Laudonio; Argentina
Light welterweight (−64 kg)	Bohumil Němeček; Czechoslovakia	Clement Quartey; Ghana	Marian Kasprzyk; Poland
Light welterweight (−64 kg)	Bohumil Němeček; Czechoslovakia	Clement Quartey; Ghana	Quincey Daniels; United States
Welterweight (−67 kg)	Nino Benvenuti; Italy	Yuri Radonyak; Soviet Union	Jimmy Lloyd; Great Britain
Welterweight (−67 kg)	Nino Benvenuti; Italy	Yuri Radonyak; Soviet Union	Leszek Drogosz; Poland
Light middleweight (−71 kg)	Wilbert McClure; United States	Carmelo Bossi; Italy	William Fisher; Great Britain
Light middleweight (−71 kg)	Wilbert McClure; United States	Carmelo Bossi; Italy	Boris Lagutin; Soviet Union
Middleweight (−75 kg)	Eddie Crook, Jr. United States	Tadeusz Walasek; Poland	Ion Monea; Romania
Middleweight (−75 kg)	Eddie Crook, Jr. United States	Tadeusz Walasek; Poland	Yevgeny Feofanov; Soviet Union
Light heavyweight (−81 kg)	Cassius Clay; United States	Zbigniew Pietrzykowski; Poland	Giulio Saraudi; Italy
Light heavyweight (−81 kg)	Cassius Clay; United States	Zbigniew Pietrzykowski; Poland	Anthony Madigan; Australia
Heavyweight (+81 kg)	Francesco de Piccoli; Italy	Daniel Bekker; South Africa	Günter Siegmund; Germany
Heavyweight (+81 kg)	Francesco de Piccoli; Italy	Daniel Bekker; South Africa	Josef Němec; Czechoslovakia

== Medal table ==
* Host nation (Italy)

Rank	Nation	Gold	Silver	Bronze	Total
1	Italy*	3	3	1	7
2	United States	3	0	1	4
3	Poland	1	3	3	7
4	Soviet Union	1	2	2	5
5	Czechoslovakia	1	0	1	2
6	Hungary	1	0	0	1
7	South Africa	0	1	1	2
8	Ghana	0	1	0	1
9	Great Britain	0	0	3	3
10	Australia	0	0	2	2
11	Argentina	0	0	1	1
11	Egypt	0	0	1	1
11	Finland	0	0	1	1
11	Japan	0	0	1	1
11	Romania	0	0	1	1
11	United Team of Germany	0	0	1	1
Totals (16 entries)		10	10	20	40

== Participating nations ==
- Argentina (10)
- Australia (10)
- Austria (5)
- Belgium (4)
- Brazil (5)
- Bulgaria (6)
- Burma (3)
- Canada (4)
- Ceylon (2)
- Chile (3)
- Cuba (1)
- Czechoslovakia (3)
- Denmark (5)
- Egypt (1)
- Finland (7)
- Formosa (2)
- France (8)
- United Team of Germany (10)
- Ghana (6)
- Great Britain (10)
- Greece (2)
- Guyana (1)
- Hungary (6)
- Indonesia (3)
- Iran (4)
- Iraq (2)
- Ireland (10)
- Italy (10)
- Japan (5)
- South Korea (6)
- Luxembourg (5)
- Mexico (3)
- Morocco (7)
- Netherlands (3)
- Nigeria (4)
- Norway (2)
- Pakistan (4)
- Philippines (1)
- Poland (10)
- Rhodesia (4)
- Romania (9)
- South Africa (8)
- Soviet Union (10)
- Spain (8)
- Sudan (3)
- Sweden (2)
- Switzerland (6)
- Thailand (3)
- Tunisia (5)
- Uganda (6)
- United Arab Republic (3)
- United States (10)
- Uruguay (3)
- Venezuela (3)
- Yugoslavia (4)
