= Bulgaria at the 1960 Summer Olympics =

- IOC code: BUL
- NOC: Bulgarian Olympic Committee

in Rome
- Competitors: 98 in 12 sports
- Flag bearer: Georgi Panov
- Medals Ranked 15th: Gold 1 Silver 3 Bronze 3 Total 7

Summer Olympics appearances (overview)
- 1896; 1900–1920; 1924; 1928; 1932; 1936; 1948; 1952; 1956; 1960; 1964; 1968; 1972; 1976; 1980; 1984; 1988; 1992; 1996; 2000; 2004; 2008; 2012; 2016; 2020; 2024; 2028

Bulgaria competed at the 1960 Summer Olympics in Rome, Italy. 98 competitors, 89 men and 9 women, took part in 66 events in 12 sports.

== Medalists ==
Medal	Name	Sport	Event	Date
Gold	Dimitar Dobrev	Wrestling	Men's Greco-Roman middleweight	31 August
Silver	Krali Bimbalov	Wrestling	Men's Greco-Roman Light heavyweight	31 August
Silver	Nezhdet Zalev	Wrestling	Men's freestyle bantamweight	6 September
Silver	Stancho Ivanov	Wrestling	Men's freestyle featherweight	6 September
Bronze	Velik Kapsazov	Gymnastics	Men's rings	10 September
Bronze	Dinko Petrov	Wrestling	Men's Greco-Roman bantamweight	30 August
Bronze	Enyu Valchev	Wrestling	Men's freestyle lightweight	5 September

== Athletics ==
Track & road events

Athlete	Event	Heat		Quarterfinal		Semifinal		Final	
Athlete	Event	Result	Rank	Result	Rank	Result	Rank	Result	Rank
Mikhail Bachvarov	Men's 100 m	11.0	5	Did not advance					
Mikhail Bachvarov	Men's 200 m	22.2	5	Did not advance					
Snezhana Kerkova	Women's 100 m	12.66	4 Q	12.80	7	Did not advance			
Snezhana Kerkova	Women's 200 m	DNS		Did not advance					
Snezhana Kerkova	Women's 80 m hurdles	11.73	3	—N/a		Did not advance			
Tsvetana Isaeva	Women's 800 m	DNS		—N/a				Did not advance	

Field events

Men's

Athlete	Event	Qualification		Final	
Athlete	Event	Distance	Position	Distance	Position
Dimitar Khlebarov	Men's pole vault	63.34	12 q	4.30	11
Khristo Khristov	Men's pole vault	4.40	1 Q	4.40	10
Dodyu Patarinski	Men's triple jump	15.37	19	Did not advance	
Lyuben Gurgushinov	Men's triple jump	DNS		Did not advance	
Todor Artarski	Men's shot put	DNS		Did not advance	
Todor Artarski	Men's discus throw	53.33	11 Q	52.12	20

Women's

Athlete	Event	Qualification		Final	
Athlete	Event	Distance	Position	Distance	Position
Lidiya Sharamovich	Women's shot put	14.09	13	Did not advance	
Tsvetanka Krasteva	Women's shot put	13.99	14	Did not advance	

== Basketball ==
=== Preliminary round ===
==== Group B ====
Team	Pld	W	L	PF	PA	PD	Pts
Czechoslovakia	3	2	1	201	192	+9	5
Yugoslavia	3	2	1	193	199	−6	5
France	3	1	2	187	190	−3	4
Bulgaria	3	1	2	209	209	0	4

August 26
16:00

Bulgaria	62–67	Yugoslavia
Scoring by half: 30–35, 32–32
Pts: Mirtchev (14)		Pts: Djuric (23)

Palazzetto dello sport, Rome
Referees: E. Alvarez Frausto (Mexico)
C. Sien (Singapore)

August 27
10:30

Czechoslovakia	69–75	Bulgaria
Scoring by half: 43–39, 26–36
Pts: Pieri (15)		Pts: Gabanyi (15)

Palazzetto dello sport, Rome
Referees: R. Weber (Switzerland)
S. Siniakov (Soviet Union)

August 29
20:00

France	73–72	Bulgaria
Scoring by half: 32–30, 41–42
Pts: Grange (21)		Pts: Mirtchev (22)

Palazzetto dello sport, Rome
Referees: D. Shirley (United States)
Bilek (Japan)

== Boxing ==
Men's

Athlete	Event	Round of 64	Round of 32	Round of 16	Quarterfinals	Semifinals	Final
Athlete	Event	Opposition Result	Opposition Result	Opposition Result	Opposition Result	Opposition Result	Rank
Stoyan Petkov	Bantamweight	Armstrong (USA); L 0-5	Did not advance				
Dimitar Stoilov	Lightweight	Bye	Gwang-ju (KOR); L 1-4	Did not advance			
Aleksandar Mitsev	Light welterweight	Bye	Daniels (USA); L 0-5	Did not advance			
Shishman Mitsev	Welterweight	Bye	Gonzalez (ARG); W 3-2	Sadok (TUN); W 3-2	Benvenuti (ITA); L 0-5	Did not advance	
Vasil Paparizov	Middleweight	—N/a	Bye	Monea (ROU); L 0-5	Did not advance		
Petar Spasov	Light heavyweight	—N/a	Ould (GBR); W 4-1	Aho (FIN); W 5-0	Pietrzykowski (POL); L 0-5	Did not advance	

== Canoeing ==
=== Sprint ===
Men

Athlete	Event	Heats		Repechages		Semifinals		Final	
Athlete	Event	Time	Rank	Time	Rank	Time	Rank	Time	Rank
Boris Lyubenov	C-1 1000 m	4:47.65	2 Q	—N/a		4:44.93	2 Q	4:42.52	8
Marin Gopov; Toma Sokolov	C-2 1000 m	4:39.68	6 Q	4:48.06	2 Q	—N/a		4:31.52	6
Lyubomir Oresharov	K-1 1000 m	DNS		did not advance					
Ivan Simeonov; Lyubomir Oresharov	K-2 1000 m	3:49.88	6 Q	3:53.27	4	did not advance			

== Cycling ==
Five male cyclists represented Bulgaria in 1960.

=== Road ===
Athlete	Event	Time	Rank
Stoyan Demirev	Men's road race	4:25:44	52
Dimitar Kotev	Men's road race	DNF	
Boyan Kotsev	Men's road race	DNF	
Ognyan Toshev	Men's road race	DNF	
Boyan Kotsev; Dimitar Kotev; Ognyan Toshev; Stoyan Demirev	Team time trial	2:26:20.48	17

=== Track ===
1000m time trial

Athlete	Event	Time	Rank
Boncho Novakov	Men's 1000m time trial	1:11.73	18

== Fencing ==
Two fencers, both men, represented Bulgaria in 1960.

Men's foil

- Boris Stavrev
- Asen Dyakovski

Men's sabre

- Boris Stavrev
- Asen Dyakovski

== Football ==
=== First round ===
==== Group A ====
Team	Pld	W	D	L	GF	GA	GD	Pts
Yugoslavia	3	2	1	0	13	4	+9	5
Bulgaria	3	2	1	0	8	3	+5	5
United Arab Republic	3	0	1	2	4	11	−7	1
Turkey	3	0	1	2	3	10	−7	1

August 26, 1960
12:00

Bulgaria	3–0	Turkey
Diev 13', 58'; Hristov 67'	Report

Grosseto, Stadio Olimpico Comunale
Attendance: 3.000
Referee: Cesare Jonni (ITA)

August 29, 1960
12:00

Bulgaria	2–0	United Arab Republic
Naidenov Yordanov 42'; Diev 88'	Report

L'Aquila, Stadio Tommaso Fattori
Attendance: 3.500
Referee: Leo Helge (DNK)

September 1, 1960
12:00

Yugoslavia	3–3	Bulgaria
Galić 50', 57', 69'	Report	Kovachev 59'; Debarski 81', 89'

Rome, Stadio Flaminio
Attendance: 15.000
Referee: Cesare Jonni (ITA)

== Gymnastics ==
The following athletes participated in gymnastics. The team tied for 10th in the men's artistic team all-around.

Athlete	Exercise results												Team total
Athlete	Floor (gymnastics)		Rings (gymnastics)		Pommel horse		Vault (gymnastics)		Parallel bars		Horizontal bar		Team total
Athlete	C	V	C	V	C	V	C	V	C	V	C	V	Team total
Todor Bachvarov (Note: sometimes transliterated as Batchvarov; also competed in the 1964 Summer Olympics)	8.60	9.15	9.25	9.10	8.80	9.30	~~7.85~~	9.05	9.05	9.35	9.00	9.20	546.60
Velik Kapsazov	8.85	9.40	9.65	9.70	9.05	8.90	8.60	9.35	9.30	9.30	9.25	9.45	546.60
Georgi Khristov	8.60	9.20	9.40	9.35	7.20	~~8.65~~	9.00	~~9.00~~	8.85	9.00	~~9.00~~	~~8.85~~	546.60
Lyuben Khristov	~~8.40~~	~~8.95~~	9.20	9.00	9.15	9.15	8.80	9.35	9.20	~~8.90~~	9.20	9.30	546.60
Nikola Prodanov	9.00	9.35	~~9.20~~	~~8.95~~	8.20	9.40	9.15	9.40	~~8.65~~	9.15	9.05	9.30	546.60
Stoyan Stoyanov	8.70	9.05	9.25	9.50	~~7.00~~	9.20	9.05	9.30	9.40	9.40	9.15	9.55	546.60
Total	43.75	46.15	46.75	46.65	42.40	45.95	44.60	46.45	45.80	46.20	45.65	46.80	546.60

== Shooting ==
Five shooters represented Bulgaria at the 1960 Summer Olympics.

Men

Athlete	Event	Qualification		Final	
Athlete	Event	Score	Rank	Score	Rank
Dencho Denev	50 m pistol	—N/a		532	24
Martsel Koen	50 m rifle prone	391	3 Q	585	8
Todor Kozlovski	50 m pistol	—N/a		532	25
Ivan Lazarov	50 m rifle three positions	549	15 Q	1120	20
Velichko Velichkov	50 m rifle three positions	555	11 Q	1128	14
Velichko Velichkov	50 m rifle prone	377	32	did not advance	

== Weightlifting ==
Men

Athlete	Event	Military press		Snatch		Clean & Jerk		Total	Rank
Athlete	Event	Result	Rank	Result	Rank	Result	Rank	Total	Rank
Kiril Georgiev	60 kg	95	11	100	7	130	8	325	9
Ivan Yordanov	67,5 kg	100	24	NVL	AC	DNS		100	DNF
Ivan Abadzhiev	75 kg	107.5	17	122.5	3	140	12	370	12
Mikhail Abadzhiev	75 kg	105	18	NVL	AC	DNS		105	DNF
Petar Tachev	82.5 kg	130	2	125	3	160	6	415	6
Vladimir Savov	90 kg	110	20	137.5	2	165	5	412.5	6
Ivan Veselinov	+90 kg	140	9	130	7	NVL	AC	270	DNF
