= Indonesia at the 1960 Summer Olympics =

- IOC code: INA (INS used at these Games)
- NOC: Indonesian Olympic Committee

in Rome
- Competitors: 22 in 8 sports
- Medals: Gold 0 Silver 0 Bronze 0 Total 0

Summer Olympics appearances (overview)
- 1952; 1956; 1960; 1964; 1968; 1972; 1976; 1980; 1984; 1988; 1992; 1996; 2000; 2004; 2008; 2012; 2016; 2020; 2024

Indonesia competed at the 1960 Summer Olympics in Rome, Italy. 22 competitors, 20 men and 2 women, took part in 17 events in 8 sports.

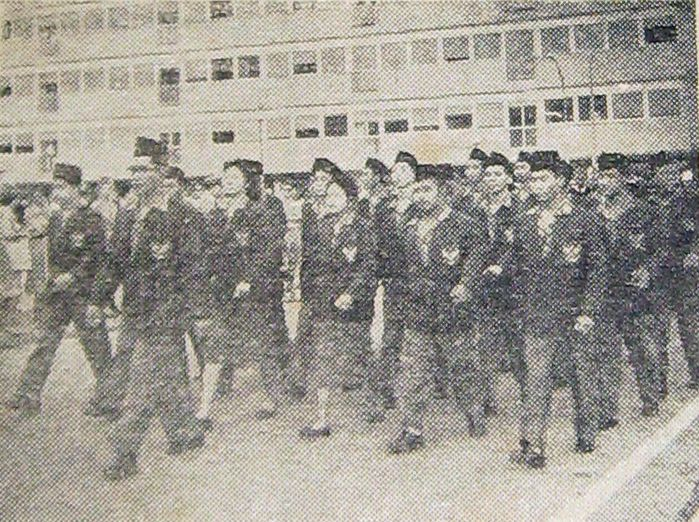
The Indonesian delegation

== Competitors ==
The following is the list of number of competitors participating in the Games:

Sport	Men	Women	Total
Athletics	1	0	1
Boxing	3	0	3
Cycling	4	0	4
Fencing	2	2	4
Sailing	5	0	5
Shooting	1	0	1
Swimming	2	0	2
Weightlifting	2	0	2
Total	20	2	22

== Athletics ==
Key

- Note–Ranks given for track events are within the athlete's heat only
- Q = Qualified for the next round
- q = Qualified for the next round as a fastest loser or, in field events, by position without achieving the qualifying target
- NR = National record
- N/A = Round not applicable for the event
- Bye = Athlete not required to compete in round

Men's Track
Athlete	Event	Heat		Quarterfinal		Semifinal		Final	
Athlete	Event	Result	Rank	Result	Rank	Result	Rank	Result	Rank
Johannes Gosal	Men's 100m	10.9	5	Did not advance					

== Boxing ==
Athlete	Event	Round of 64	Round of 32	Round of 16	Quarterfinals	Semifinals	Final	
Athlete	Event	Opposition Result	Opposition Result	Opposition Result	Opposition Result	Opposition Result	Opposition Result	Rank
Salek Mahju	Flyweight	—N/a	Lee (GBR); L 0–5	did not advance				
Oei Hok Tiang	Bantamweight	—N/a	Weiss (AUT); L 0–5	did not advance				
Johnny Bolang	Lightweight	Lapopolo (ITA); L 0–5	did not advance					

== Cycling ==
=== Road ===
Four male cyclists represented Indonesia in 1960.

Individual road race

- Hendrik Brocks - (did not advance)
- Rusli Hamsjin - (did not advance)
- Theo Polhaupessy - (did not advance)
- Sanusi - (did not advance)

Team time trial
*(Rank 26) - 2:34:29.98

- Sanusi
- Rusli Hamsjin
- Theo Polhaupessy
- Hendrik Brocks

== Fencing ==
Four fencers, two men and two women, represented Indonesia in 1960.

Men's épée

- Andreas Soeratman (Round 1, Rank 6)

Men's sabre

- Jushar Haschja (Round 1, Rank 4)

Women's foil

- Sioe Gouw Pau (Round 1, Rank 4)
- Zuus Undapp (Round 1, Rank 6)

== Sailing ==
Men

Athlete	Event	Race							Net points	Final rank
Athlete	Event	1	2	3	4	5	6	7	Net points	Final rank
Ashari Danudirdjo; Eri Sudewo; Josef Muskita	Dragon class	27	23	26	27	27	25	23	795	26th place
Lie Eng Soei; Leopold Kalesaran	Flying Dutchman class	26	~~DNF~~	27	25	23	~~DNF~~	26	1041	28th place

== Shooting ==
One shooter represented Indonesia in 1960.

50 m pistol

- Sanusi Tjokroadiredjo (57 place) 328 points

== Swimming ==
Men

Athlete	Event	Heat		Semifinal		Final	
Athlete	Event	Time	Rank	Time	Rank	Time	Rank
Achmad Dimyati	100 m freestyle	59.1	=31	Did not advance			
Zakaria Nasution	400 m freestyle	4:54.0	34	—N/a		Did not advance	
Zakaria Nasution	1500 m freestyle	19:18.6	22	—N/a		Did not advance	
Otman Siregar	200 m breaststroke	DNS		Did not advance			
Habib Nasution	200 m butterfly	DNS		Did not advance			

== Weightlifting ==
Athlete	Event	Military press		Snatch		Clean & Jerk		Total	Rank
Athlete	Event	Result	Rank	Result	Rank	Result	Rank	Total	Rank
Tan Tjoe Gwat	Bantamweight	85.0	=16	90.0	=10	115.0	=16	285.0	17
Asber Nasution	Featherweight	~~105.0~~	DNF	—	—	—	—	—	DNF

== See also ==
- 1960 Paralympic Games
- Indonesia at the Olympics
- Indonesia at the Paralympics
