= Boxing at the 1960 Summer Olympics – Bantamweight =

Olympic boxing tournament

Bantamweight boxing at the Games of the XVII Olympiad
- Venue: Palazzo dello Sport
- Dates: 25 August – 5 September 1960
- Competitors: 32 from 32 nations

Medalists
1st place, gold medalist(s)		Oleg Grigoryev	Soviet Union
2nd place, silver medalist(s)		Primo Zamparini	Italy
3rd place, bronze medalist(s)		Brunon Bendig	Poland
3rd place, bronze medalist(s)		Oliver Taylor	Australia

The men's bantamweight event was part of the boxing programme at the 1960 Summer Olympics. The weight class allowed boxers of up to 54 kilograms to compete. The competition was held from 25 August to 5 September 1960. 32 boxers from 32 nations competed.

== Competition format ==
The competition was a straight single-elimination tournament, with no bronze medal match (two bronze medals were awarded, one to each semifinal loser). There were 33 boxers entered, but the boxer from the Republic of China withdrew at the last minute, too late to change the bracket; therefore, one bout was conducted in the round of 64 and one boxer received a bye in the round of 32.

== Results ==
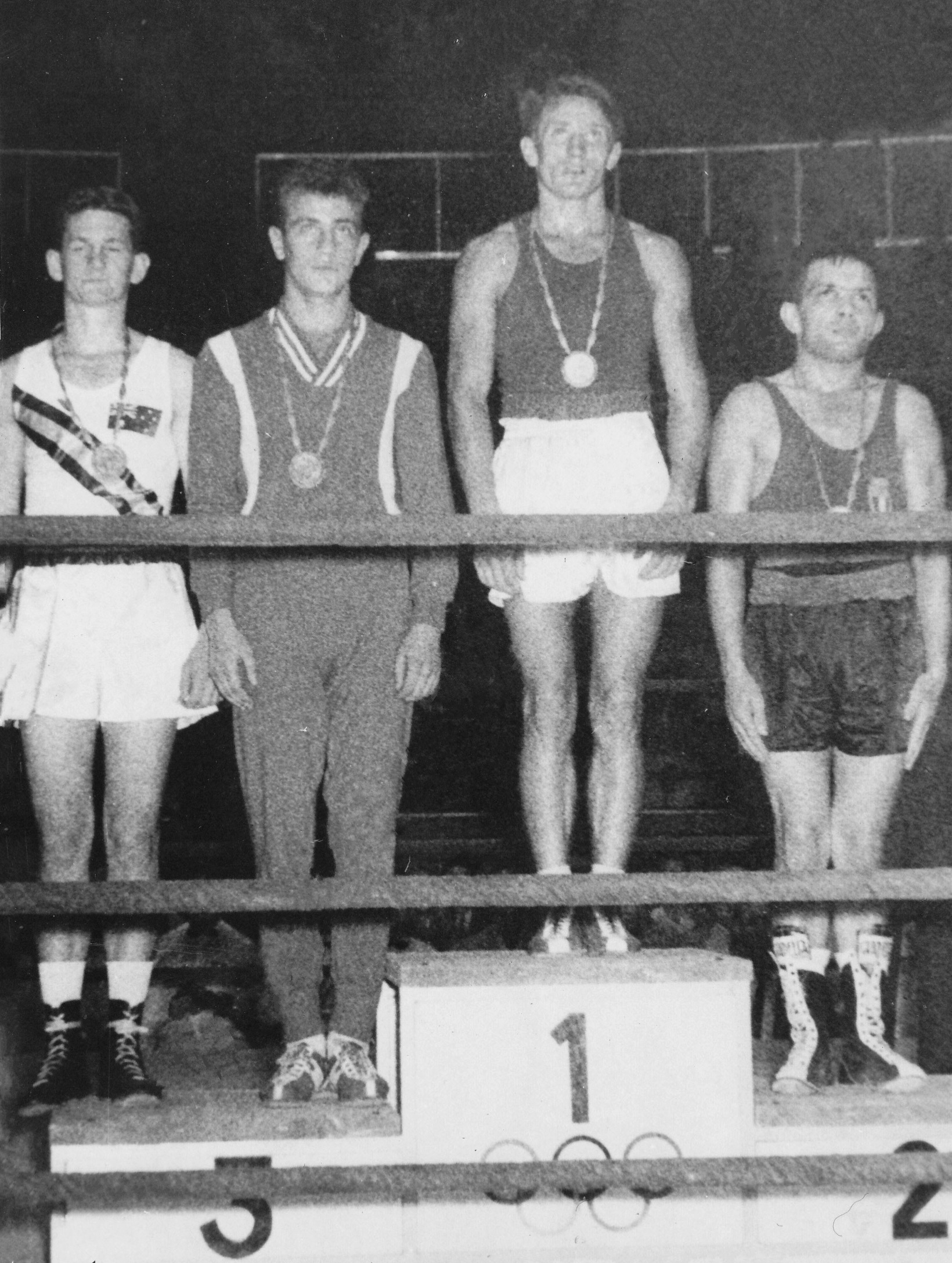
Left-right: Oliver Taylor, Brunon Bendig, Oleg Grigoryev, Primo Zamparini

Results of the bantamweight boxing competition.

=== Top half ===
Round of 32
Thein Myint (BIR)	5
Charles Reiff (LUX)	0
Sadegh Ali Akbarzadeh Khoi (IRI)	1
Muhammad Nasir (PAK)	4
Waldomiro Pinto (BRA)	0
Oleg Grigoryev (URS)	5
Frankie Taylor (GBR)	KO-1
Paavo Roininen (FIN)	L
John Sentongo (UGA)	0
Brunon Bendig (POL)	5
Jean Parra (FRA)	2
József Nagy (HUN)	3
Marcel Bellefeuille (CAN)	0
Horst Rascher (EUA)	5

Round of 16
Thein Myint (BIR)	5
Muhammad Nasir (PAK)	0
Oleg Grigoryev (URS)	3
Frankie Taylor (GBR)	2
Jan de Rooij (NED)	0
Brunon Bendig (POL)	5
József Nagy (HUN)	1
Horst Rascher (EUA)	4

Quarterfinals
Thein Myint (BIR)	L
Oleg Grigoryev (URS)	WO
Brunon Bendig (POL)	3
Horst Rascher (EUA)	2

Semifinals
Oleg Grigoryev (URS)	4
Brunon Bendig (POL)	1

=== Bottom half ===
Round of 64
Jerry Armstrong (USA)	5
Stoyan Petkov (BUL)	0

Round of 32
Nicolae Puiu (ROU)	4
Tamar Ben Hassan (TUN)	1
Oliver Taylor (AUS)	5
Ahmed Bouazza (MAR)	0
Oei Hok Tiang (INA)	0
Peter Weiss (AUT)	5
Joseph Oboh Kalu (NGR)	0
Alfonso Carbajo (ESP)	5
Panagiotis Kostarellos (GRE)	0
Primo Zamparini (ITA)	5
Katsuo Haga (JPN)	5
Carlos Cañete (ARG)	0
Emile Anner (SUI)	0
Patrick Kenny (IRL)	5
Gang Chun-won (KOR)	1
Jerry Armstrong (USA)	4

Round of 16
Nicolae Puiu (ROU)	2
Oliver Taylor (AUS)	3
Peter Weiss (AUT)	1
Alfonso Carbajo (ESP)	3
Primo Zamparini (ITA)	5
Katsuo Haga (JPN)	0
Patrick Kenny (IRL)	2
Jerry Armstrong (USA)	3

Quarter-finals
Oliver Taylor (AUS)	4
Alfonso Carbajo (ESP)	1
Primo Zamparini (ITA)	4
Jerry Armstrong (USA)	1

Semi-finals
Oliver Taylor (AUS)	0
Primo Zamparini (ITA)	5

=== Finals ===
Semifinals
Oleg Grigoryev (URS)	4
Brunon Bendig (POL)	1
Oliver Taylor (AUS)	0
Primo Zamparini (ITA)	5

Final
Oleg Grigoryev (URS)	3
Primo Zamparini (ITA)	2
