= Cycling at the 1960 Summer Olympics – Men's individual road race =

Men's cycling road race at the Games of the XVII Olympiad
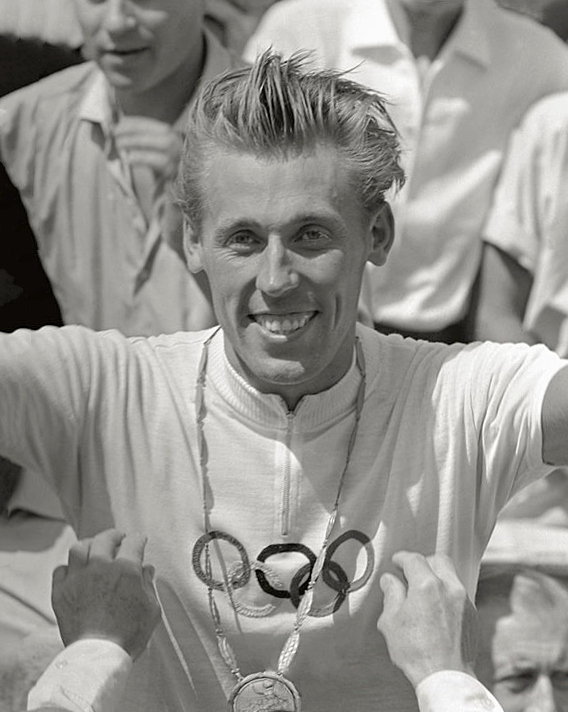
- Viktor Kapitonov
- Venue: Grottarossa Circuit, Rome; 175.38 km (109.0 mi)
- Date: 30 August 1960
- Competitors: 142 from 42 nations
- Winning time: 4:20:37

Medalists
1st place, gold medalist(s)		Viktor Kapitonov; Soviet Union
2nd place, silver medalist(s)		Livio Trapè; Italy
3rd place, bronze medalist(s)		Willy Vanden Berghen; Belgium

The men's individual road race at the 1960 Summer Olympics in Rome, Italy, was held on 30 August 1960. There were 142 participants from 42 nations. Each nation could enter up to four cyclists. Of the 142 starters 76 rode the distance to the end. The event was won by Viktor Kapitonov of the Soviet Union, the nation's first medal in the event. Livio Trapè of Italy took silver, putting that country on the podium for the second consecutive Games. Willy Vanden Berghen's bronze gave Belgium its fourth medal in four Games (one in 1948, two in 1952, none in 1956).

== Background ==
This was the sixth appearance of the event, previously held in 1896 and then at every Summer Olympics since 1936. It replaced the individual time trial event that had been held from 1912 to 1932 (and which would be reintroduced alongside the road race in 1996). The favorites were the German riders Gustav-Adolf Schur (1958 and 1959 world champion) and Bernhard Eckstein (1960 world champion).

For the first time since the reintroduction of the event in 1936, there was no corresponding team event (it had been replaced by a separate team time trial). The Danish riders entered in the individual event withdrew after the death of Knud Enemark Jensen in the team time trial.

The British West Indies, Indonesia, Iraq, Ireland, Israel, Malta, Morocco, Portugal, San Marino, Spain, Ceylon (Sri Lanka), and Tunisia each made their debut in the men's individual road race; East and West Germany competed as the United Team of Germany. Great Britain made its sixth appearance in the event, the only nation to have competed in each appearance to date.

== Competition format and course ==
The mass-start race was on a course that covered 12 laps of a 14.615 kilometres circuit known as the "Grottarossa Circuit," for a total of 175.38 kilometres. The course ran along the Via Flaminia, the Via Di Grottarossa, and the Via Cassia. Each lap included "a slightly steep climb, and a series of switchbacks, just after the 6 km. point, and then ascended gently for the next 2½ km."

== Schedule ==
All times are Central European Time (UTC+1)

The day was hot, despite the morning start, with temperatures at 38 degrees Celsius.

Date	Time	Round
Tuesday, 30 August 1960	9:00	Final

== Results ==
The first break was by van Kreuningen in lap 2. He led by himself until lap 5 when his teammate Hugens joined him. In lap 7, however, the pair was caught by a pack of seven cyclists. Additional cyclists moved up into the lead group in laps 7 and 8. The next significant breakaway from that bunch was by Trapè and Kapitonov in lap 10. Kapitonov broke into a sprint to finish lap 11, apparently confused as to how many laps had been completed. Trapè caught up to him, with a large (39 cyclists) chase pack bearing down on the pair in the actual final lap, lap 12. Kapitonov successfully repeated his sprint to beat Trapè, and the chase pack ultimately did not come within 20 seconds of the pair.

The Official Report lists only the finishers, requiring historians to put together a list of non-finishers from other sources. Further, the finish-line judge left to have lunch and the placement of the finishers is suspect based on photographs and personal reports from the cyclists.

Rank	Cyclist	Nation	Time
1st place, gold medalist(s)	Viktor Kapitonov	Soviet Union	4:20:37
2nd place, silver medalist(s)	Livio Trapè	Italy	4:20:37
3rd place, bronze medalist(s)	Willy Vanden Berghen	Belgium	4:20:57
4	Yury Melikhov	Soviet Union	4:20:57
5	Ion Cosma	Romania	4:20:57
6	Stanisław Gazda	Poland	4:20:57
7	Benoni Beheyt	Belgium	4:20:57
8	Janez Žirovnik	Yugoslavia	4:20:57
9	Jacques Gestraut	France	4:20:57
10	Antonio Bailetti	Italy	4:20:57
11	Bogusław Fornalczyk	Poland	4:20:57
12	Erwin Jaisli	Switzerland	4:20:57
13	Roland Lacombe	France	4:20:57
14	Roby Hentges	Luxembourg	4:20:57
15	François Hamon	France	4:20:57
16	José Antonio Momeñe	Spain	4:20:57
17	Paul Nyman	Finland	4:20:57
18	Jim Hinds	Great Britain	4:20:57
19	Giuseppe Tonucci	Italy	4:20:57
20	Egon Adler	United Team of Germany	4:20:57
21	Erich Hagen	United Team of Germany	4:20:57
22	Bernhard Eckstein	United Team of Germany	4:20:57
23	Gustav-Adolf Schur	United Team of Germany	4:20:57
24	Michael Hiltner	United States	4:20:57
25	René Andring	Luxembourg	4:20:57
26	Gunnar Göransson	Sweden	4:20:57
27	Rubén Darío Gómez	Colombia	4:20:57
28	Hernán Medina	Colombia	4:20:57
29	Arsenio Chirinos	Venezuela	4:20:57
30	Ivan Levačić	Yugoslavia	4:20:57
31	Nevenko Valčić	Yugoslavia	4:20:57
32	Emil Beeler	Switzerland	4:20:57
33	Yevgeny Klevtsov	Soviet Union	4:20:57
34	Gainan Saidkhuzhin	Soviet Union	4:20:57
35	Arnold Ruiner	Austria	4:20:57
36	Bill Bradley	Great Britain	4:20:57
37	William Holmes	Great Britain	4:20:57
38	Jan Hugens	Netherlands	4:20:57
39	Henry Ohayon	Israel	4:20:57
40	Salvatore Palmucci	San Marino	4:20:57
41	Paul Camilleri	Malta	4:20:57
42	Kurt Postl	Austria	4:21:58
43	Frank Brazier	Australia	4:21:58
44	Ricardo Senn	Argentina	4:21:58
45	Mohamed Ben Mohamed	Morocco	4:21:58
46	Mohamed Ghandora	Morocco	4:21:58
47	Osvald Johansson	Sweden	4:21:58
48	Ramón Hoyos	Colombia	4:21:58
49	Robert Lelangue	Belgium	4:22:02
50	Raymond Reaux	France	4:23:57
51	Roger Thull	Luxembourg	4:25:34
52	Stoyan Georgiev Demirev	Bulgaria	4:25:44
53	Ken Laidlaw	Great Britain	4:25:44
54	Jan Chtiej	Poland	4:25:44
55	Raimo Honkanen	Finland	4:25:44
56	Ignacio Astigarraga	Spain	4:25:44
57	Abdallah Lahoucine	Morocco	4:25:44
58	Jan Janssen	Netherlands	4:26:05
59	Unto Hautalahti	Finland	4:26:05
60	Matti Herronen	Finland	4:26:05
61	Luis Zárate	Mexico	4:26:05
62	Emilio Vidal	Venezuela	4:26:05
63	José Ferreira	Venezuela	4:28:24
64	Lars Zebroski	United States	4:28:40
65	Max Wechsler	Switzerland	4:28:40
66	Wes Chowen	United States	4:31:12
67	Alan Grindal	Australia	4:31:12
68	Jacinto Brito	Mexico	4:31:12
69	Alojz Bajc	Yugoslavia	4:31:12
70	Fritz Inthaler	Austria	4:31:23
71	Per Digerud	Norway	4:31:23
72	Hubert Bächli	Switzerland	4:31:37
73	Owe Adamson	Sweden	4:31:37
74	Mohamed Touati	Tunisia	4:35:56
75	Bob Tetzlaff	United States	4:35:56
76	Gheorghe Calcişcă	Romania	4:40:29
—	Garry Jones	Australia	DNF
—	Robert Whetters	Australia	DNF
—	Kurt Schweiger	Austria	DNF
—	Joseph Geurts	Belgium	DNF
—	Dimitar Kotev	Bulgaria	DNF
—	Boyan Kotsev	Bulgaria	DNF
—	Ognyan Toshev	Bulgaria	DNF
—	Luigi Bartesaghi	Canada	DNF
—	Alessandro Messina	Canada	DNF
—	Pablo Hurtado	Colombia	DNF
—	Juan Sánchez	Spain	DNF
—	Ventura Díaz	Spain	DNF
—	Kouflu Alazar	Ethiopia	DNF
—	Guremu Demboba	Ethiopia	DNF
—	Amousse Tessema	Ethiopia	DNF
—	Megra Admassou	Ethiopia	DNF
—	Ferenc Stámusz	Hungary	DNF
—	János Dévai	Hungary	DNF
—	Ferenc Horváth	Hungary	DNF
—	Győző Török	Hungary	DNF
—	Hendrik Brocks	Indonesia	DNF
—	Rusli Hamsjin	Indonesia	DNF
—	Theo Polhaupessy	Indonesia	DNF
—	Sanusi	Indonesia	DNF
—	Peter Crinnion	Ireland	DNF
—	Sonny Cullen	Ireland	DNF
—	Séamus Herron	Ireland	DNF
—	Mahmood Munim	Iraq	DNF
—	Hamid Oraibi	Iraq	DNF
—	Itzhak Ben David	Israel	DNF
—	Vendramino Bariviera	Italy	DNF
—	Masashi Omiya	Japan	DNF
—	Jo Jae-hyeon	South Korea	DNF
—	Lee Seung-hun	South Korea	DNF
—	Pak Jong-hyeon	South Korea	DNF
—	No Do-cheon	South Korea	DNF
—	Adolf Heeb	Liechtenstein	DNF
—	Louis Grisius	Luxembourg	DNF
—	Ahmed Omar	Morocco	DNF
—	Mauricio Mata	Mexico	DNF
—	Filiberto Mercado	Mexico	DNF
—	John Bugeja	Malta	DNF
—	Joseph Polidano	Malta	DNF
—	René Lotz	Netherlands	DNF
—	Lex van Kreuningen	Netherlands	DNF
—	Wiesław Podobas	Poland	DNF
—	Ramiro Martins	Portugal	DNF
—	José Pacheco	Portugal	DNF
—	Mário Silva	Portugal	DNF
—	Francisco Valada	Portugal	DNF
—	Gabriel Moiceanu	Romania	DNF
—	Aurel Şelaru	Romania	DNF
—	Domenico Cecchetti	San Marino	DNF
—	Sante Ciacci	San Marino	DNF
—	Vito Corbelli	San Marino	DNF
—	Maurice Coomarawel	Ceylon	DNF
—	Gösta Pettersson	Sweden	DNF
—	Ali Ben Ali	Tunisia	DNF
—	Mohamed El-Kemissi	Tunisia	DNF
—	Bechir Mardassi	Tunisia	DNF
—	Rubén Etchebarne	Uruguay	DNF
—	Rodolfo Rodino	Uruguay	DNF
—	Juan José Timón	Uruguay	DNF
—	Alberto Velázquez	Uruguay	DNF
—	Francisco Mujica	Venezuela	DNF
—	Clyde Rimple	British West Indies	DNF
