= Primo Zamparini =

Italian boxer (1939–2024)

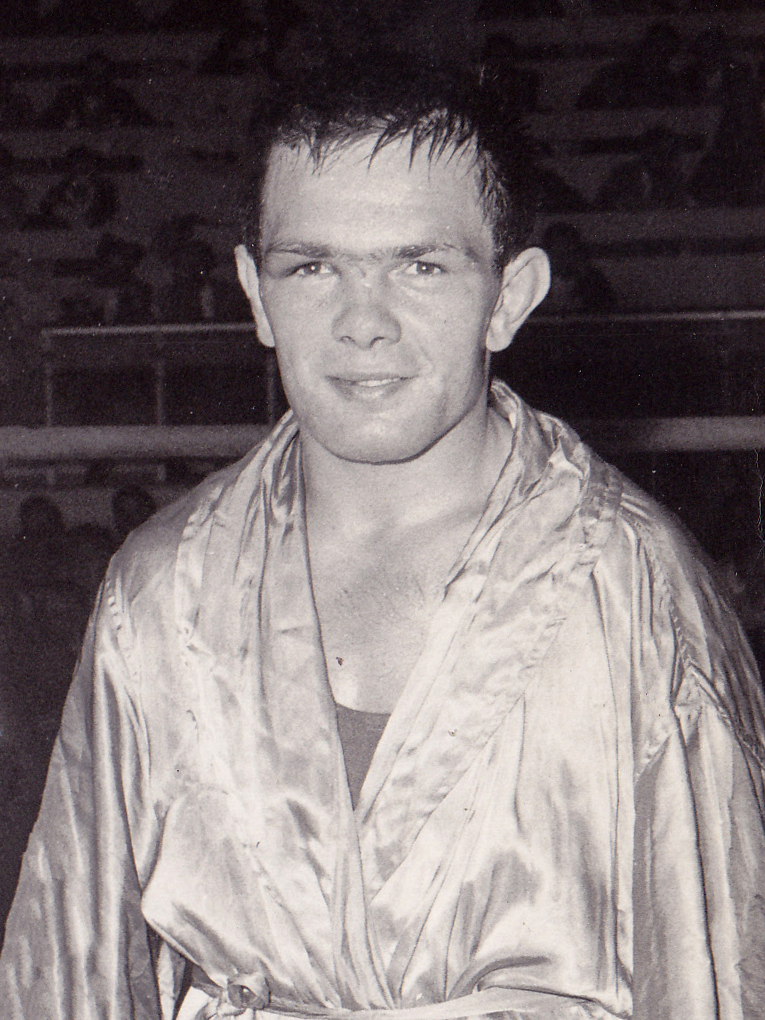
- Zamparini at the 1960 Olympics

Personal information
- Born: 9 February 1939 Fabriano, Italy
- Died: 21 August 2024 (aged 85) Fabriano, Italy
- Height: 1.58 m (5 ft 2 in)
- Weight: 54 kg (119 lb)

Sport
- Sport: Boxing
Medal record
Representing Italy
Olympic Games
Silver medal – second place	1960 Rome	Bantamweight
European Championships
Bronze medal – third place	1961 Belgrade	Bantamweight

Primo Zamparini (9 February 1939 – 21 August 2024) was an Italian bantamweight boxer who won a silver medal at the 1960 Olympics. After winning a bronze at the 1961 European Amateur Boxing Championships in Belgrade, he turned professional, and had a record of 16 wins (7 by knockout), 6 losses and 6 draws. He was nicknamed "macchina di pugni" (punching machine). He retired in 1966. After his retirement he founded the amateur club Pugilistica Fabrianese, where he also served as a coach.

Zamparini died in Fabriano on 21 August 2024 from the consequences of a fall, at the age of 85.

== Amateur career ==
=== Highlights ===
European Championships (54 kg), Luzern, Switzerland, May 1959:

- 1/16: Bye
- 1/8: Defeated Paavo Roininen (Finland) by decision
- 1/4: Lost to Oleg Grigoryev (Soviet Union) by unanimous decision, 0–5

(gold) World Military Championships (54 kg), Wiesbaden, West Germany, June 1960:

- Finals: (no data available)

(silver) XVII Summer Olympics (54 kg), Rome, Italy, August–September 1960:

- 1/32: Bye
- 1/16: Defeated Panagiotis Kostarellos (Greece) by unanimous decision, 5–0
- 1/8: Defeated Katsuo Haga (Japan) by unanimous decision, 5–0
- 1/4: Defeated Jerry Armstrong (United States) by majority decision, 4–1
- 1/2: Defeated Oliver Taylor (Australia) by unanimous decision, 5–0
- Finals: Lost to Oleg Grigoryev (Soviet Union) by split decision, 1–3–1

(bronze) European Championships (54 kg), Belgrade, Yugoslavia, June 1961:

- 1/8: Defeated Miodrag Mitrović (Yugoslavia) by decision
- 1/4: Defeated Gyula Török (Hungary) by decision
- 1/2: Lost to Sergey Sivko (Soviet Union) by decision

== Professional boxing record ==
28 fights	16 wins	6 losses
By knockout	7	2
By decision	9	4
Draws	6	
