= Jørgen Jørgensen (cyclist) =

Danish cyclist (1936–2016)

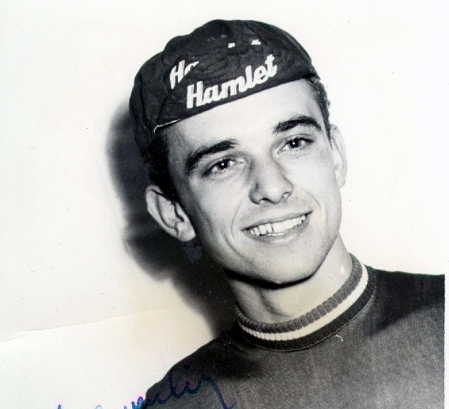
- Jørgen Jørgensen, c. 1960

Personal information
- Full name: Jørgen Breiholt Jørgensen
- Nickname: Bendy
- Born: 1 April 1936 Copenhagen, Denmark
- Died: January 2016 (aged 79)
- Height: 171 cm (5 ft 7 in)
- Weight: 60 kg (132 lb)

Cycling career
- Sport: Cycling

Professional team
- CC Gladsaxe

Jørgen Jørgensen (1 April 1936 – January 2016) was a Danish cyclist. He competed in the 100 km cycling team time trial at the 1960 Summer Olympics as a member of the four-man Danish team alongside Knud Enemark Jensen, Niels Baunsøe, and Vagn Bangsborg. The event was held on 26 August 1960 at the Viale Cristoforo Colombo in Rome, and the temperatures during the race reached 42 °C (108 °F). He dropped out of the race during the first lap due to heat stroke.

== Athletic career ==
The following are Jørgensen's results:

=== 1957 ===
Date	Country	Race	Position	Distance
10-09-1957	(Sweden) SWE	Sex-Dagars 1957 "Ronde van Zweden"	2	175 km

=== 1958 ===
Date	Country	Race	Position	Distance
10-08-1958	(Denmark) DEN	Nationalt mesterskab "National Championship"	12	173.6 km

=== 1959 ===
Date	Country	Race	Position	Distance
08-03-1959	(Denmark) DEN	Nationalt mesterskab "National Championship"	3	168 km
02-05-1959	(East Germany) DDR	Závod Míru 1959 "Peace Race" Stage 1 †	9	119 km

†: The athlete is not listed as having competed in any stages other than the 1st stage of the 1959 peace race, and is not listed amongst the finishers of the entire race.

=== 1960 ===
Date	Country	Race	Position	Distance
03-05-1960	(Czech Republic) CZE (Slovakia) SVK	Závod Míru 1960 "Peace Race" Stage 2 †	6	145 km
10-05-1960	(Poland) POL	Závod Míru 1960 "Peace Race" Stage 8 †	10	117 km
15-05-1960	(East Germany) DDR	Závod Míru 1960 "Peace Race" Stage 12 †	10	40 km
16-05-1960	(Czech Republic) CZE (Slovakia) SVK (Poland) POL (East Germany) DDR	Závod Míru 1960 "Peace Race" Overall Standings †	28	2295 km
26-08-1960	(Italy) ITA	Olympic Men's 1960 Team time trial	DNF	100 km
22-10-1959	(Denmark) DEN	Odense 1960 Fyen Rundt	3	225 km

†: The athlete is only listed in some stages of the 1960 peace race, but was given a final standing and therefore likely participated in the other stages.
