= Bill Freund =

Bill Freund may refer to:

- Bill Freund (cyclist) (born 1941), American Olympic cyclist
- Bill Freund (historian) (1944–2020), American historian in South Africa
