= Demirev =

Demirev (Bulgarian: Демирев) is a Bulgarian masculine surname, its feminine counterpart is Demireva. It may refer to

- Demir Demirev (born 1984), Bulgarian weightlifter
- Mirela Demireva (born 1989), Bulgarian high jumper
- Stoyan Georgiev Demirev (born 1932), Bulgarian cyclist
