= Rutschmann =

Rutschmann is a surname. Notable people with the surname include:

- Ernst Rutschmann (born 1948), Swiss football player
- René Rutschmann (born 1941), Swiss cyclist

== See also ==
- Rutschman
