= Patrick Kenny =

Patrick Kenny may refer to:

- Patrick W. Kenny (died 1931), Irish politician
- Paddy Kenny (hurler) (1929-2004) Irish sportsperson
- Patrick Kenny (boxer) (born 1934), Irish Olympic boxer
- Pat Kenny (born 1948), Irish broadcaster
- Paddy Kenny (born 1978), football goalkeeper for Leeds United

== See also ==
- Paddy Kenny (rugby union) (Padraig Kenny, born 1960), Irish Rugby Union player
