= Charles Reiff =

Luxembourgish boxer

Personal information
- Nationality: Luxembourgish
- Born: 27 December 1940; Dudelange, Luxembourg
- Died: 24 December 1964 (aged 23); Dudelange, Luxembourg

Sport
- Sport: Boxing

Charles Reiff (27 December 1940 – 24 December 1964) was a Luxembourgish boxer. He competed in the men's bantamweight event at the 1960 Summer Olympics. At the 1960 Summer Olympics, he lost to Thein Myint of Myanmar in the Round of 32.
