= Postl =

Postl is a surname. Notable people with the surname include:

- Carl Postl (1793–1864), Austrian-American writer and journalist, more commonly known by pen name, Charles Sealsfield
- Dylan Postl (born 1986), American wrestler more commonly known by ring name, Hornswoggle
- Kurt Postl (born 1937), Austrian cyclist
