= Kotev =

Kotev is a surname. Notable people with the surname include:

- Dimitar Kotev (1941–2001), Bulgarian Olympic cyclist
- Kiril Kotev (born 1982), Bulgarian football player
- Lachezar Kotev (born 1998), Bulgarian football player
