= Knud Enemark Jensen =

Danish cyclist (1936–1960)

Personal information
- Full name: Knud Enemark Jensen
- Nationality: Danish
- Born: 30 November 1936 Århus, Midtjylland, Denmark
- Died: 26 August 1960 (aged 23) Rome, Italy
- Height: 1.74 m (5 ft 9 in)
- Weight: 65 kg (143 lb)

Sport
- Sport: Cycling

Knud Enemark Jensen (30 November 1936 – 26 August 1960) was a Danish cyclist who died while participating in the 1960 Summer Olympics in Rome, Italy. During his career, he was involved in an early doping scandal.

== Biography ==
Enemark Jensen lying in the road after his fall.

Enemark Jensen was born in Aarhus. In 1960 he was the winner of the individual Nordic Championship, as well as a member of the Danish team that won the silver medal in the team time trial at that event.

The Olympic 100 km team time trial road race was held in 40 °C (104 °F) heat on Via Cristoforo Colombo in Rome. One of the four-man Danish team, Jørgen Jørgensen, dropped out of the race due to sunstroke after the first lap, necessitating that all three remaining Danish cyclists finish the race for the team not to be disqualified. Enemark Jensen told his teammates that he felt dizzy. Niels Baunsøe clutched his jersey, keeping him from falling, while Vagn Bangsborg held Enemark Jensen from the other side. Bangsborg sprayed Enemark Jensen with water, leading to an apparent improvement, but when Baunsøe let go, Enemark Jensen collapsed and fractured his skull on the pavement.

Enemark Jensen was brought by ambulance to a military tent near the finish line, with temperatures inside the tent reaching approximately 50 °C (122 °F), where he died that afternoon without regaining consciousness. Prince Axel of Denmark, an International Olympic Committee member, was on his way to Enemark Jensen's bedside when Enemark Jensen died.

Oluf Jørgensen, the Danish cycling team's trainer, told Danish government investigators that he had given Enemark Jensen and some other cyclists Roniacol (nicotinyl alcohol), a vasodilator. Enemark Jensen's autopsy was conducted at the Istituto di Medicina Legale. On 25 March 1961, the three Italian physicians who performed the autopsy submitted a final report stating that Enemark Jensen's death was caused by heatstroke, and that no drugs were found in his body. The complete autopsy report was never made public. Years later, Alvaro Marchiori, one of the doctors who conducted the autopsy, claimed that they had "found traces of several things", including amphetamine.

Enemark Jensen's death led the International Olympic Committee to form a medical committee in 1961 and institute drug testing at the 1968 Winter Olympics in Grenoble, France, and at the 1968 Summer Olympics in Mexico City, Mexico. Enemark Jensen was married to the niece of former Olympic cycling champion Henry Hansen. His family received one million lire (equivalent to €14,000 in 2020) from an Olympic insurance policy in compensation for his death.

== See also ==
- List of racing cyclists and pacemakers with a cycling-related death
- List of doping cases in cycling
- List of sportspeople sanctioned for doping offences
- Denmark at the 1960 Summer Olympics
- Olympic and Paralympic deaths
