= Oleg Grigoryev =

Russian boxer (born 1937)

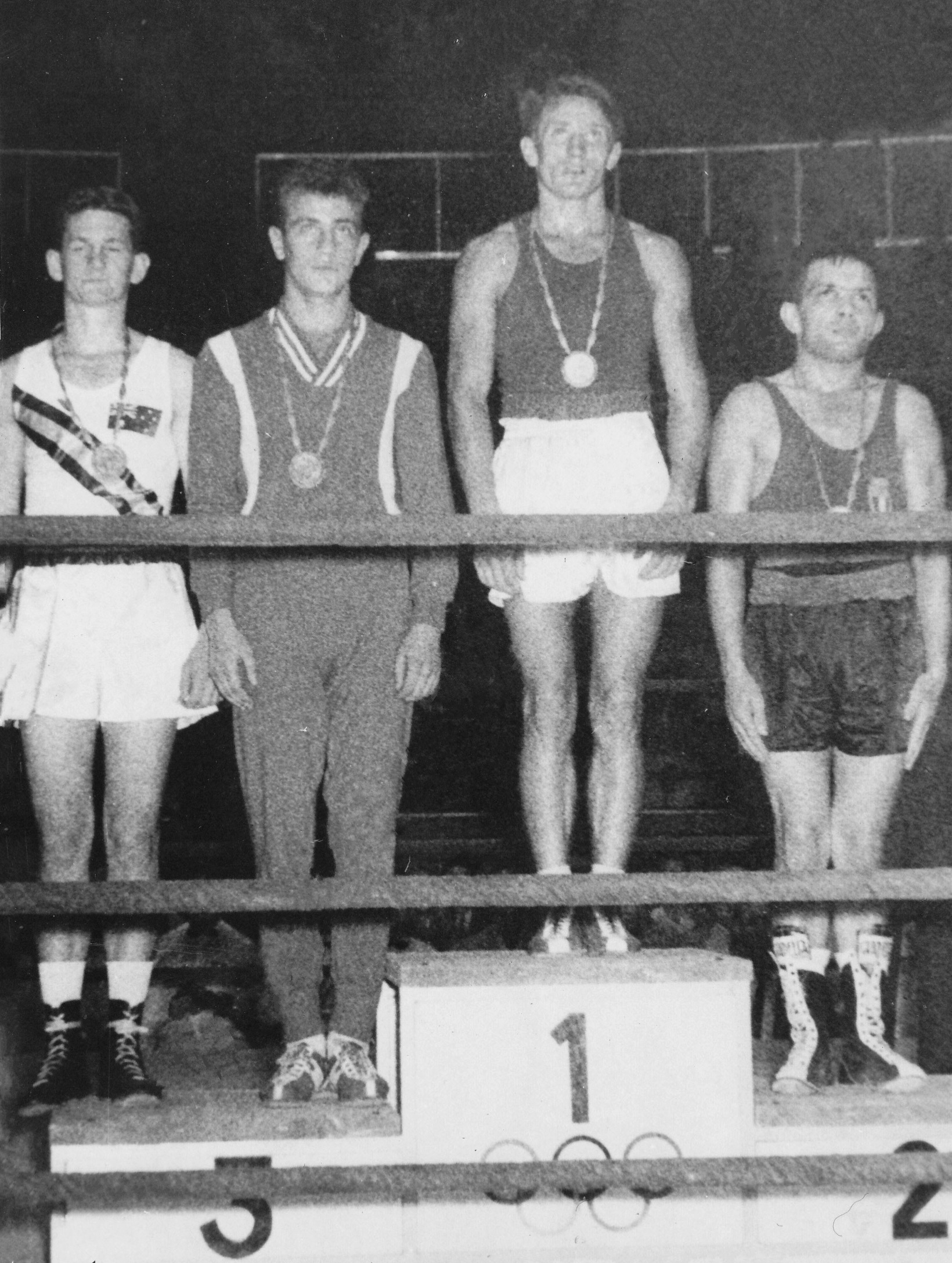
- Grigoryev (center) at the 1960 Olympics

Personal information
- Born: 25 December 1937 (age 88) Moscow, Russian SFSR, Soviet Union
- Height: 156 cm (5 ft 1 in)

Sport
- Sport: Boxing
- Club: Trudovye Rezervy; CSKA Moscow
Medal record
Representing the Soviet Union
Olympic Games
Gold medal – first place	1960 Rome	-54 kg
European Amateur Championships
Gold medal – first place	1957 Prague	-54 kg
Silver medal – second place	1959 Lucerne	-54 kg
Gold medal – first place	1963 Moscow	-54 kg
Gold medal – first place	1965 Berlin	-54 kg

Oleg Georgievich Grigoryev (Russian: Олег Георгиевич Григорьев; born 25 December 1937) is a retired Russian Olympic bantamweight boxer. He won the European title in 1957, 1963 and 1965 and an Olympics gold medal in 1960, all in the featherweight category.

== Career ==
Grigoryev took up boxing in 1951. He was the Soviet bantamweight champion in 1958, 1962–65 and 1967, placing second in 1957 and 1960. He also won the Military Spartakiads of the Friendly Armies of the Socialist Countries in 1961, 1962, and finished second in 1963. He was a favorite at the 1964 Olympics, but was eliminated in the third bout. He retired from competitions in 1968 with a record of 176 wins out of 196 bouts.

=== Highlights ===
USSR–FRG Duals (54 kg), Moscow, Soviet Union, February 1956:

- Defeated Manfred Hahner (West Germany) by decision

(gold) European Championships (54 kg), Prague, Czechoslovakia, May–June 1957:

- 1/16: Bye
- 1/8: Defeated Jorma Limmonen (Finland) by unanimous decision, 3–0
- 1/4: Defeated Heinz Huber (Austria) by walkover
- 1/2: Defeated Peter Goschka (West Germany) by unanimous decision, 3–0
- Finals: Defeated Gianfranco Piovesani (Italy) by unanimous decision, 3–0

(silver) European Championships (54 kg), Lucerne, Switzerland, May 1959:

- 1/16: Bye
- 1/8: Defeated Peter Weiss (Austria) by unanimous decision, 5–0
- 1/4: Defeated Primo Zamparini (Italy) by unanimous decision, 5–0
- 1/2: Defeated Miodrag Mitrović (Yugoslavia) by split decision, 3–2
- Finals: Lost to Horst Rascher (West Germany) by unanimous decision, 0–5

Scandinavia–USSR Duals (54 kg), Stockholm, Sweden, April 1960:

- Defeated V. Lindblad (Sweden)

(gold) XVII Summer Olympics (54 kg), Rome, Italy, August–September 1960:

- 1/32: Bye
- 1/16: Defeated Wald Claudiano (Brazil) by unanimous decision, 5–0
- 1/8: Defeated Francis Taylor (Great Britain) by split decision, 3–2

(Following a British protest of the decision which favored Grigoryev over Taylor, some 15 of the referees and judges were relieved of their duties.)

- 1/4: Defeated Myint Thein (Burma) by walkover
- 1/2: Defeated Brunon Bendig (Poland) by majority decision, 4–1
- Finals: Defeated Primo Zamparini (Italy) by split decision, 3–1–1

(gold) European Championships (54 kg), Moscow, Soviet Union, May–June 1963:

- 1/8: Bye
- 1/4: Defeated Ferenc Cserge (Hungary) by decision
- 1/2: Defeated Rainer Poser (East Germany) by decision
- Finals: Defeated Branislav Petrić (Yugoslavia) KO 3

XVIII Summer Olympics (54 kg), Tokyo, Japan, October 1964:

- 1/32: Bye
- 1/16: Defeated Gyula Török (Hungary) RSC 2
- 1/8: Defeated Franco Zurlo (Italy) by unanimous decision, 5–0
- 1/4: Lost to Juan Fabila Mendoza (Mexico) by split decision, 2–3

(gold) European Championships (54 kg), East Berlin, East Germany, May 1965:

- 1/16: Bye
- 1/8: Defeated Jimmy Henry (Ireland) by decision
- 1/4: Defeated Tibor Papp (Hungary) by decision
- 1/2: Defeated Nicolae Gîju (Romania) by decision
- Finals: Defeated Jan Gałązka (Poland) by decision
