= Stoyan Petkov =

Bulgarian boxer

Personal information
- Nationality: Bulgarian
- Born: 9 June 1935 (age 89); Montana, Bulgaria

Sport
- Sport: Boxing

Stoyan Petkov (born 9 June 1935) is a Bulgarian boxer. He competed in the men's bantamweight event at the 1960 Summer Olympics. At the 1960 Summer Olympics, he lost to Jerry Armstrong of the United States.
