= Gheorghe Calcișcă =

Romanian cyclist

Personal information
- Born: 10 January 1935 (age 91) Bucharest, Romania

Cycling career
- Sport: Cycling

Gheorghe Calcișcă (born 10 January 1935) is a former Romanian cyclist. He competed in the individual road race at the 1960 Summer Olympics.
