= János Dévai =

Hungarian cyclist

Personal information
- Born: 9 January 1940 Pécs, Hungary
- Died: 11 September 2006 (aged 66)

Cycling career
- Sport: Cycling

János Dévai (9 January 1940 – 11 September 2006) was a Hungarian cyclist. He competed in the individual road race at the 1960 Summer Olympics.
