= Gabriel Niell =

Argentine cyclist

Personal information
- Born: 29 July 1941 Buenos Aires, Argentina
- Died: 31 March 2013 (aged 71)

Cycling career
- Sport: Cycling

Gabriel Niell (29 July 1941 – 31 March 2013) was an Argentine cyclist. He competed in the team time trial at the 1960 Summer Olympics.
