= Jean Parra =

French boxer

Personal information
- Nationality: French
- Born: 18 August 1938; Lyon, France
- Died: 25 July 2002 (aged 63); Pierre-Bénite, France

Sport
- Sport: Boxing

Jean Parra (18 August 1938 – 25 July 2002) was a French boxer. He competed in the men's bantamweight event at the 1960 Summer Olympics. At the 1960 Summer Olympics, he lost to József Nagy of Hungary.
