= Alfonso Carbajo =

Spanish boxer

Personal information
- Nationality: Spanish
- Born: 17 February 1938 (age 87); Barcelona, Spain

Sport
- Sport: Boxing

Alfonso Carbajo (born 17 February 1938) is a Spanish boxer. He competed in the men's bantamweight event at the 1960 Summer Olympics.
