= Federico Cortés =

Argentine cyclist

Personal information
- Born: 24 November 1937 (age 88) San Salvador de Jujuy, Argentina

Cycling career
- Sport: Cycling

Federico Cortés (born 24 November 1937) is a former Argentine cyclist. He competed in the team time trial at the 1960 Summer Olympics.
