= Raymond Reaux =

French cyclist

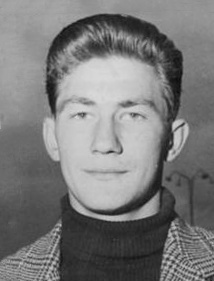
- Raymond Reaux in 1960

Personal information
- Born: 18 December 1940 Ostreville, France
- Died: 20 September 2021 (aged 80) Arras, France
- Height: 1.72 m (5 ft 8 in)
- Weight: 69 kg (152 lb)

Sport
- Sport: Cycling

Raymond Reaux (18 December 1940 – 20 September 2021) was a French cyclist. He competed at the 1960 Summer Olympics in the individual road race and finished in 50th place. He finished second in the Paris-Arras race in 1959 and in the Circuit Franco-Belge race in 1963.
