= Max Wechsler (cyclist) =

Swiss cyclist

Personal information
- Born: 6 October 1938 Luthern, Switzerland
- Died: 1 January 1978 (aged 39)

Cycling career
- Sport: Cycling

Max Wechsler (6 October 1938 – 1 January 1978) was a Swiss cyclist. He competed in the individual road race at the 1960 Summer Olympics.
