= Waldomiro Pinto =

Brazilian boxer (1934–2013)

Waldo Pinto
Personal information
- Born: 22 October 1934 Rio de Janeiro, Brazil
- Died: 27 February 2013 (aged 78)

Sport
- Sport: Boxing
Medal record
Men's amateur boxing
Representing Brazil
Pan American Games
Gold medal – first place	1959 Chicago	Bantamweight

Waldomiro "Waldo" Claudiano Pinto (22 October 1934 – 27 February 2013) was a Brazilian boxer. He competed in the men's bantamweight event at the 1960 Summer Olympics. At the 1960 Summer Olympics, he received a bye in the Round of 64, then lost by decision to Oleg Grigoryev of the Soviet Union in the Round of 32.
