= József Nagy (boxer, born 1934) =

Hungarian boxer

Personal information
- Nationality: Hungarian
- Born: 8 September 1934 (age 92) Budapest, Kingdom of Hungary

Sport
- Sport: Boxing

József Nagy (born 8 September 1934) is a Hungarian boxer. He competed in the men's bantamweight event at the 1960 Summer Olympics.

Born in Budapest, Nagy boxed for the club Újpesti TE. At the 1960 Olympics in Rome, he received a bye in the first round and beat Jean Parra of France on points in the second round. He was eliminated in the third round on 1 September 1960, losing on points to Horst Rascher of the United Team of Germany, and finished joint ninth.
