= Yvan Covent =

Belgian cyclist

Personal information
- Born: 12 October 1940 Nazareth, Belgium
- Died: 19 November 2011 (aged 71) Nazareth, Belgium

Cycling career
- Sport: Cycling

Yvan Covent (12 October 1940 – 19 November 2011) was a Belgian cyclist. He competed in the team time trial at the 1960 Summer Olympics.
