= Bernhard Eckstein =

German cyclist (1935–2017)

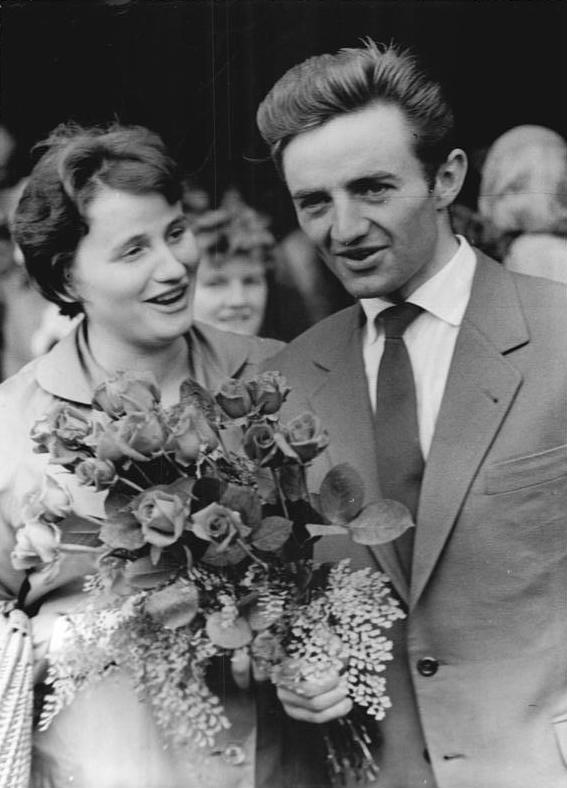
- Bernhard Eckstein with wife in 1961

Personal information
- Born: 21 August 1935 Zwochau, Germany
- Died: 10 November 2017 (aged 82)
- Height: 1.64 m (5 ft 5 in)
- Weight: 57 kg (126 lb)

Sport
- Sport: Cycling
- Club: SC DHfK, Leipzig
Medal record
World championships
Gold medal – first place	1960 Sachsenring	Amateur's Road race

Bernhard Eckstein (21 August 1935 – 10 November 2017) was a German cyclist. In 1960, he won the road race at the world championships and finished in 22nd place in the road race at the 1960 Summer Olympics. During his career he won six one-day races, four in 1958, one in 1960 (the Manx Trophy in the amateurs division), and one in 1966.
