= Franz Inthaler =

Austrian cyclist

Personal information
- Born: 26 September 1940 Vienna, Austria
- Died: 14 January 2004 (aged 63)
- Height: 1.79 m (5 ft 10 in)
- Weight: 72 kg (159 lb)

Sport
- Sport: Cycling

Franz Inthaler (26 September 1940 – 14 January 2004) was an Austrian cyclist who was active between 1959 and 1974. In 1960 he finished third at the Tour of Austria. He was the brother of Fritz Inthaler, who was also a cyclist.
