= Kang Choon-won =

South Korean boxer

Personal information
- Nationality: South Korean
- Born: 5 November 1940 (age 84); Seoul, South Korea

Sport
- Sport: Boxing

Kang Choon-won (born 5 November 1940) is a South Korean boxer. He competed in the men's bantamweight event at the 1960 Summer Olympics.
