= Maurice Coomarawel =

Sri Lankan cyclist

Personal information
- Born: 16 April 1940
- Died: 22 July 2008 (aged 68) Australia

Cycling career
- Sport: Cycling

Maurice Coomarawel (16 April 1940 – 22 July 2008) was a Sri Lankan cyclist. He competed in the individual road race at the 1960 Summer Olympics.
