= Peter Crinnion =

Irish cyclist

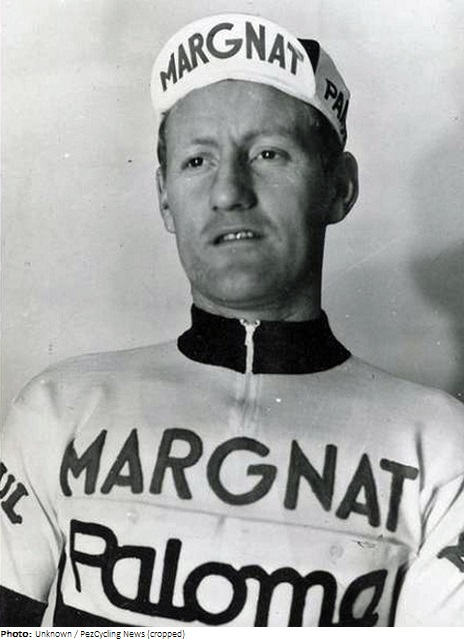

Personal information
- Born: 12 February 1939 (age 87) Bray, Ireland

Cycling career
- Sport: Cycling
- Discipline: Road Racing

Peter Crinnion (born 12 February 1939) is a former Irish cyclist. He competed in the individual road race at the 1960 Summer Olympics.
