= Emilio Vidal (cyclist) =

Venezuelan cyclist

Personal information
- Born: 2 April 1929 (age 97) Alobres, Venezuela

Cycling career
- Sport: Cycling

Emilio Vidal (born 2 April 1929) is a former Venezuelan cyclist. He competed in the individual road race at the 1960 Summer Olympics.
