= Marcel Bellefeuille (boxer) =

Canadian boxer (1940–1998)

Personal information
- Born: 21 November 1940; Montreal, Quebec, Canada
- Died: 21 October 1998 (aged 57); Montreal, Quebec, Canada

Sport
- Sport: Boxing

Marcel Bellefeuille (21 November 1940 – 21 October 1998) was a Canadian boxer. He competed in the men's bantamweight event at the 1960 Summer Olympics. At the 1960 Summer Olympics, he lost in the Round of 32 to Horst Rascher of the United Team of Germany.
