= Sonny Cullen =

Irish cyclist

Personal information
- Full name: Anthony Cullen
- Born: 10 July 1934 Dublin, Ireland
- Died: 8 August 1999 (aged 65) Dublin, Ireland

Cycling career
- Sport: Cycling

Anthony "Sonny" Cullen (10 July 1934 – 8 August 1999) was an Irish cyclist. He competed in the individual road race at the 1960 Summer Olympics.
