= Paavo Roininen =

Finnish boxer (1935–2022)

Personal information
- Nationality: Finnish
- Born: 24 July 1935; Utajärvi, Finland
- Died: 10 October 2022 (aged 87); Vaasa, Finland

Sport
- Sport: Boxing

Paavo Roininen (24 July 1935 – 10 October 2022) was a Finnish boxer. He competed in the men's bantamweight event at the 1960 Summer Olympics. At the 1960 Summer Olympics in Rome, he received a bye in the Round of 64. He then lost to Frankie Taylor of Great Britain by knockout in the Round of 32.
