= Joseph Oboh Kalu =

Nigerian boxer

Personal information
- Nationality: Nigerian
- Born: 9 January 1940 (age 85); Ekoli Adde, Nigeria

Sport
- Sport: Boxing

Joseph Oboh Kalu (born 9 January 1940) is a Nigerian boxer. He competed in the men's bantamweight event at the 1960 Summer Olympics.
