= Rutschman =

Rutschman is a surname. Notable people with the surname include:

- Ad Rutschman (born 1931), American football coach, former baseball coach, and college athletics administrator
- Adley Rutschman (born 1998), American baseball player

== See also ==
- Rutschmann
