= Stanisław Gazda =

Polish cyclist (1938–2020)

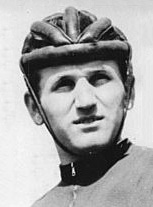
- Gazda in 1960

Personal information
- Born: 11 May 1938 Pszczyna, Poland
- Died: 28 October 2020 (aged 82) Rybnik, Poland
- Height: 1.66 m (5 ft 5 in)
- Weight: 69 kg (152 lb)

Cycling career
- Sport: Cycling
- Discipline: Road
- Role: Rider

Amateur teams
- Flota Gdynia
- Start Bielsko-Biała

Stanisław Gazda (11 May 1938 – 28 October 2020) was a Polish cyclist.

== Career ==
He competed at the 1960 Summer Olympics in Rome in the road race and finished in sixth place. He was on the podium of the Tour de Pologne in 1958, 1959, 1962, 1963 and 1972 and won the race in 1963. In 1962, he finished third in the Peace Race. He also won three stages in this race; one each in 1960, 1962 and 1964.

Gazda was a carpenter by profession but later worked as a councilor. He married Lydia, a teacher; they have a daughter Ewa and son Wojciech and lived in Pszczyna. Gazda was awarded the Cross of Merit. His brother Kazimierz was also a competitive cyclist.
