= Aurel Șelaru =

Romanian cyclist (1935–2020)

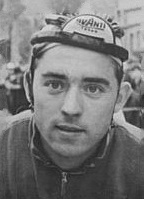
- Aurel Șelaru in 1960

Personal information
- Born: 15 March 1935 (age 91) Bucharest, Romania
- Died: 3 February 2020 Bucharest, Romania
- Height: 1.78 m (5 ft 10 in)
- Weight: 69 kg (152 lb)

Sport
- Sport: Cycling

Aurel Șelaru (born 15 March 1935, Bucharest - died 3 February 2020, Bucharest) was a Romanian racing cyclist, part of the "golden generation" of Romanian cycling from the 1950s to the 1960s. He competed for Dinamo Bucharest and for the national team of Romania, where he had colleagues, among others: Ion Cosma, Gabriel Moiceanu, Marcel Voinea, Ludovic Zanoni, Gheorghe Calcișcă, Walter Siegler, Constantin Dumitrescu and his good friend Dumitru Constantin.

He obtained 11 national titles in the velodrome and road events, being the holder of the title of Master of Sport.

He was winner in the individual standings of the Scânteii Race, the Stalin Region Cycling Race and multiple stage winner in the Tour of Romania.

He participated in the 1960 Olympics, from Rome (Italy), where he obtained the 6th place together with the national team of Romania (of which Ion Cosma, Gabriel Moiceanu and Ludovic Zanoni also participated) in the team 100 km race.

He placed on the podium, with the national team of Romania, in the Tours of Yugoslavia and Egypt. He participated with the national team of Romania in the World Championships and the Peace Race.

He won with the Dinamo team: Tour of Romania, Cycling Tour of the Stalin Region, Race of the Mountains, UCECOM Cup etc.

He remained in history as the only Romanian cyclist to win an edition of the Romanian-Bulgarian Friendship Race (Bucharest-Sofia stage race in 1957).

== Career results ==
What is this?

=== 1954 ===
- two 1st places in the distance events;
- 1st place in the Australian race;
- 1st place in the race with the addition of points (75 km);
- 2nd place in the elimination race;
- two 2nd places in the distance events (75 km);
- 3rd place in the race with the addition of points (75 km).

=== 1955 ===
- national champion of the velodrome in the distance event;
- national champion of the velodrome in the race with the addition of points;
- 3rd place at the national velodrome championships in the team track trial;
- 5th place at the national championships in the 1000m race, starting from the spot;
- 1st place, on teams, in the 16 February Cup (road race);
- 3rd place in the Constructorul cycling race (road race, 100 km).
- 9th place stage I in the Victory Race (road race, in stages);
- 4th place stage III in the Victory Race;
- 2nd place stage IV in the Victory Race;
- 7th place overall, individually, and 4th place overall, on teams, in the Victory Race.

=== 1956 ===
- 1st place stage I of the 7 November Cup;
- 1st place stage II of the 7 November Cup;
- 1st place overall, both individually and in teams, in the 7 November Cup;
- 3rd place overall, individually, in the Stalin City Cycling Race (race in stages);
- 1st place stage I in Harvest Cup;
- 5th place overall, individually, and 1st place overall, in teams, in the Harvest Cup;
- 1st place stage I in the Victory Race;
- 2nd place stage IV in the Race of the Mountains;
- 3rd place stage II in the Spark Race;
- 5th place in the Sportul Popular cyclocross race (Bucharest).

=== 1957 ===
He obtains the title of Master of Sport, overcoming the barrier of 44 km / h hourly average on the sixth stage of the Tour of Egypt (Suef-ElGizeh).

- national championship runner-up in the distance road race;
- 1st place stage I in the Romanian-Bulgarian Friendship Race, Bucharest-Sofia (stage with arrival in Brăila);
- 1st place overall, individually, in the Romanian-Bulgarian Friendship Race, Bucharest-Sofia;
- 2nd place stage II in the Stalin Region Cycling Circuit;
- 2nd place stage III in the Stalin Region Cycling Circuit;
- 1st place overall, both individually and in teams, in the Stalin Region Cycling Circuit. 2nd place, overall, in the climbers ranking;
- 3rd place in the 16 February Cup;
- 2nd place XI stage of the Tour of Egypt;
- 17th place overall, individually, and 4th place overall, in teams, on the Tour of Egypt;
- 2nd place stage II in the Victory Race;
- 2nd place stage IV in the Victory Race;
- 3rd place stage II in the Scânteii Race;
- 10th place, overall, individually, in the Race of the Mountains (race with international participation).

=== 1958 ===
He participates with the national team of Romania in the Peace Race (see photo)

- double national champion in the road events;
- 4th place stage IV of the Tour of Egypt;Aurel Șelaru – Muzeul ciclismului românesc
- 3rd place stage V of the Tour of Egypt;
- 4th place stage VIII of the Tour of Egypt;
- 3rd place stage XI of the Tour of Egypt;
- 3rd place stage XIII of the Tour of Egypt;
- 9th place overall, individually, and 3rd place overall, in teams, on the Tour of Egypt;
- 2nd place stage III in the Race of the Mountains;
- 2nd place overall, individually, and 1st place overall, in teams, in the Race of the Mountains;
- 1st place stage I in the Scânteii Race;
- 3rd place overall, individually, in the Scânteii Race;
- 32nd place, overall, individually, and 2nd place, overall, in teams, on the Tour of Yugoslavia;
- 1st place stage IV (Cluj-Sibiu) of the Tour of the Romanian People's Republic;
- 4th place overall, individually, and 1st place overall, in teams, on the RPR Tour; 2nd place overall in the climber rankings and 5th overall in the sprinter rankings;
- 3rd place in the RPR-RDG cycling race;
- 1st place stage IV of the Stalin Region Cycling Tour;
- 5th place overall, individually, and 1st place overall, in teams, on the Stalin Region Cycling Tour;
- 1st place stage IV of the Race of the Mountains;
- 3rd place overall, both individually and in teams, in the Race of the Mountains;
- 6th place stage VI of the Tour of Yugoslavia;
- 9th place overall, individually, and 3rd place overall, in teams, on the Tour of Yugoslavia.

=== 1959 ===
- double national champion in the road events;
- national champion on the track in the team track trial;
- sets a new national record at the national track championships in the team track trial (4m50.9s);
- Bucharest City Champion on the velodrome;
- 2nd place stage I of the RPR Tour;
- 4th place stage II of the RPR Tour;
- 7th place overall, individually, and 1st place overall, in teams, on the RPR Tour;
- 1st place in Bucharest-Câmpina road race;
- 1st place stage I of the UCFS District Council Cup I.V. Stalin.

=== 1960 ===
- double national champion in the road events, individually and in teams;
- 6th place in the team race (100 km) at the Rome Olympics (Italy);Aurel Selaru - Comitetul Olimpic si Sportiv Roman
- 3rd place overall, individually, in the FRC Cup;
- 4th place overall, individually, and 1st place overall, in teams, in the UCECOM Cup.

=== 1961 ===
- national champion in the road event;
- 1st place stage I of the Scânteii Race;
- 1st place overall, individually, in the Scânteii Race;
- 1st place in the Arad stage of the RPR Tour (see photo);
- 7th place overall, individually, on the RPR Tour.

=== 1962 ===
- national champion in the road event;
- 38th place in the individual race at the World Championships in Salo (Italy);
- 7th place, in teams, at the World Championships in Salò (Italy);
- 9th place stage III of the Peace Race;
- 6th place overall in teams, with the national team of Romania, in the Peace Race

=== 1963 ===
- national champion in the road event;
- national championship runner-up in the road event.

=== 1964 ===
- national champion in the road event.

=== Other notable results ===
- winner of the Dinamo Cup;
- winner of the Voința Cup;
- winner of the Spring Cup.
