= Víctor Chirinos =

Venezuelan cyclist

Personal information
- Full name: Víctor Chirinos Farines
- Born: 1 February 1941 (age 85) Caracas, Venezuela

Cycling career
- Sport: Cycling

Víctor Chirinos (born 1 February 1941) is a Venezuelan former cyclist. He competed in the team time trial at the 1960 Summer Olympics.
