= Emile Anner =

Swiss boxer (born 1940)

Personal information
- Nationality: Swiss
- Born: 18 January 1940 (age 85); Basel, Switzerland

Sport
- Sport: Boxing

Emile Anner (born 18 January 1940) is a Swiss boxer. He competed in the men's bantamweight event at the 1960 Summer Olympics.
