= Emil Beeler =

Swiss cyclist

Personal information
- Born: 7 November 1937 (age 88) Schänis, Switzerland

Cycling career
- Sport: Cycling

Emil Beeler (born 7 November 1937) is a former Swiss cyclist. He competed in the individual road race at the 1960 Summer Olympics.
