= Joseph Geurts =

Belgian cyclist

Personal information
- Born: 6 July 1939 Hasselt, Belgium
- Died: 7 December 2012 (aged 73)

Cycling career
- Sport: Cycling

Joseph Geurts (6 July 1939 – 7 December 2012) was a Belgian cyclist. He competed in the individual road race at the 1960 Summer Olympics.
