= Nico Pleimling =

Luxembourgish cyclist

Personal information
- Full name: Nicolas Pleimling
- Born: 15 December 1938 Luxembourg, Luxembourg
- Died: 17 July 2023 (aged 84) Luxembourg

Cycling career
- Sport: Cycling

Nicolas Pleimling (15 December 1938 – 17 July 2023) was a Luxembourgish cyclist. He competed in the team time trial at the 1960 Summer Olympics.
