= Roby Hentges =

Luxembourgish cyclist

Personal information
- Full name: Robert Hentges
- Born: 15 September 1940 (age 86) Differdange, Luxembourg

Cycling career
- Sport: Cycling

Robert "Roby" Hentges (born 15 September 1940) is a former Luxembourgish cyclist. He competed in the individual road race at the 1960 Summer Olympics.
