= Pedro Simionato =

Argentine cyclist

Personal information
- Born: 28 March 1938 (age 88) Buenos Aires, Argentina

Cycling career
- Sport: Cycling

Pedro Simionato (born 28 March 1938) is a former Argentine cyclist. He competed in the team time trial at the 1960 Summer Olympics.
