= Peter Deimböck =

Austrian cyclist

Personal information
- Born: 24 April 1942 (age 84) Vienna, Nazi Germany

Cycling career
- Sport: Cycling

Peter Deimböck (born 24 April 1942) is a former Austrian cyclist. He competed in the team time trial and team pursuit events at the 1960 Summer Olympics. He was born in Vienna, his profession is a baker.
