= Bill Freund (cyclist) =

American cyclist

Personal information
- Born: May 26, 1941 (age 85) Detroit, Michigan, United States

Cycling career
- Sport: Cycling

Bill Freund (born May 26, 1941) is a former American cyclist. He competed in the team time trial at the 1960 Summer Olympics.
