= Panagiotis Kostarellos =

Greek boxer (born 1933)

Personal information
- Nationality: Greek
- Born: 1933 (age 91–92); Domokos, Greece

Sport
- Sport: Boxing

Panagiotis Kostarellos (born 1933) is a Greek boxer. He competed in the men's bantamweight event at the 1960 Summer Olympics.
