= Mikhail Abadzhiev =

Bulgarian weightlifter

Personal information
- Nationality: Bulgarian
- Born: 5 November 1935 (age 89); Novi Pazar, Bulgaria
- Height: 1.72 m (5 ft 8 in)
- Weight: 75 kg (165 lb)

Sport
- Sport: Weightlifting

Mikhail Nikolov Abadzhiev (Bulgarian: Михаил Абаджиев) (born 5 November 1935) is a Bulgarian weightlifter. He competed in the 1960 Summer Olympics.
