= Friedrich Suda =

Austrian swimmer

Personal information
- Born: 11 June 1939 (age 87) Vienna, Nazi Germany

Sport
- Sport: Swimming

Friedrich Suda (born 11 June 1939) is an Austrian former backstroke swimmer. He competed at the 1960 Summer Olympics and the 1964 Summer Olympics.
