= Jan de Rooij =

Dutch boxer

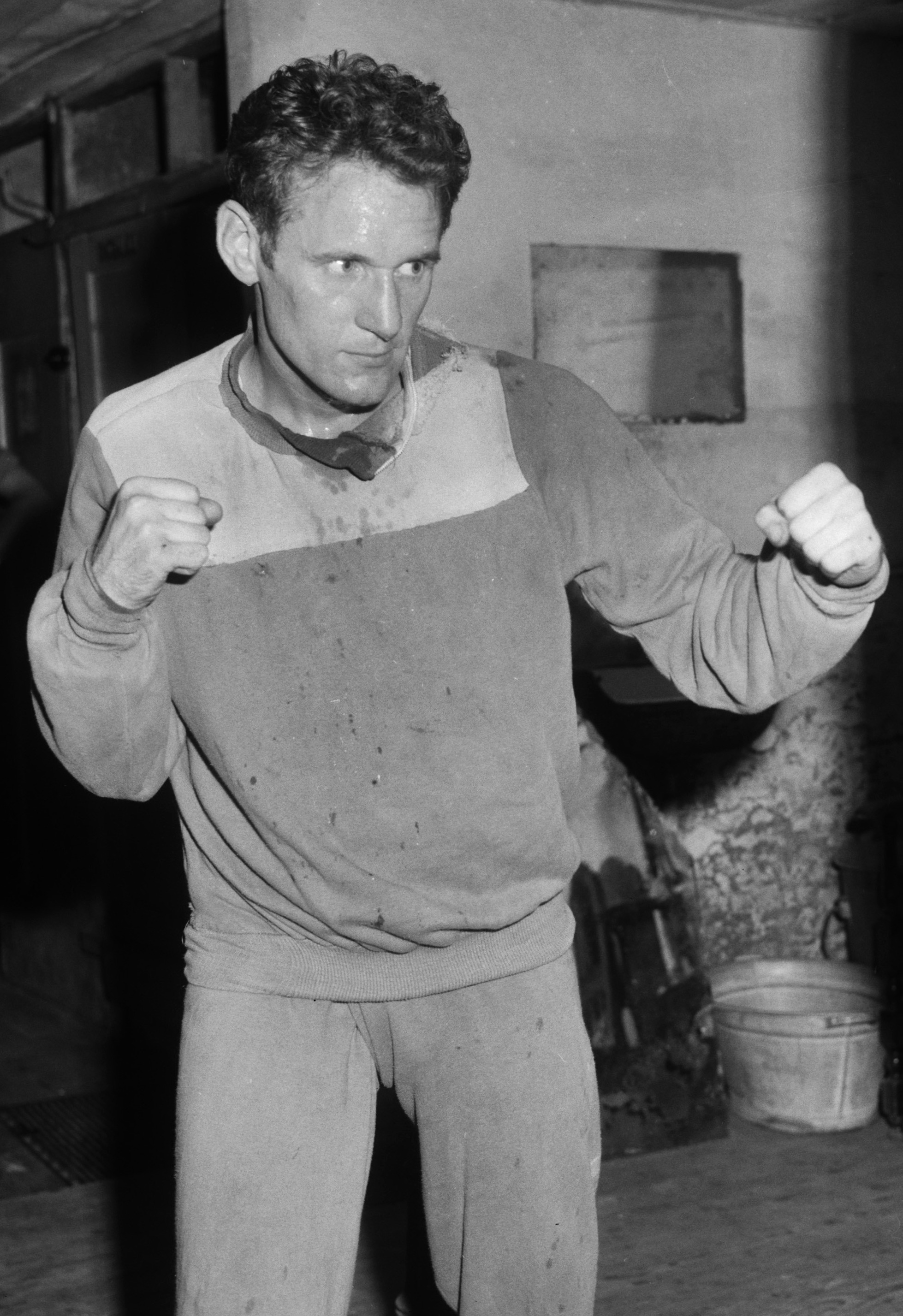
- Jan de Rooij in 1964

Personal information
- Nationality: Netherlands
- Born: 26 January 1932 Amsterdam, Netherlands
- Died: 18 May 2008 (aged 76) Amsterdam, Netherlands
- Weight: Bantamweight, featherweight

Boxing career
- Stance: Orthodox

Johannes "Jan" de Rooij (26 January 1932 – 18 May 2008) was a Dutch amateur boxer. He competed at the 1960 and 1964 Olympics and was eliminated in the third and first match, respectively. During his career he won 10 national titles and after retiring worked as a boxing coach in Amsterdam.
