= Günther Kriz =

Austrian cyclist

Personal information
- Born: 12 October 1940 (age 86) Vienna, Nazi Germany

Cycling career
- Sport: Cycling

Günther Kriz (born 12 October 1940) is a former Austrian cyclist. He competed in the 1000m time trial and team pursuit events at the 1960 Summer Olympics.
