= Erich Moritz =

Austrian sailor

Erich Moritz (10 August 1940 – 25 November 2005) was an Austrian yacht racer who competed in the 1960 Summer Olympics and in the 1972 Summer Olympics.
