= Brunon Bendig =

Polish boxer

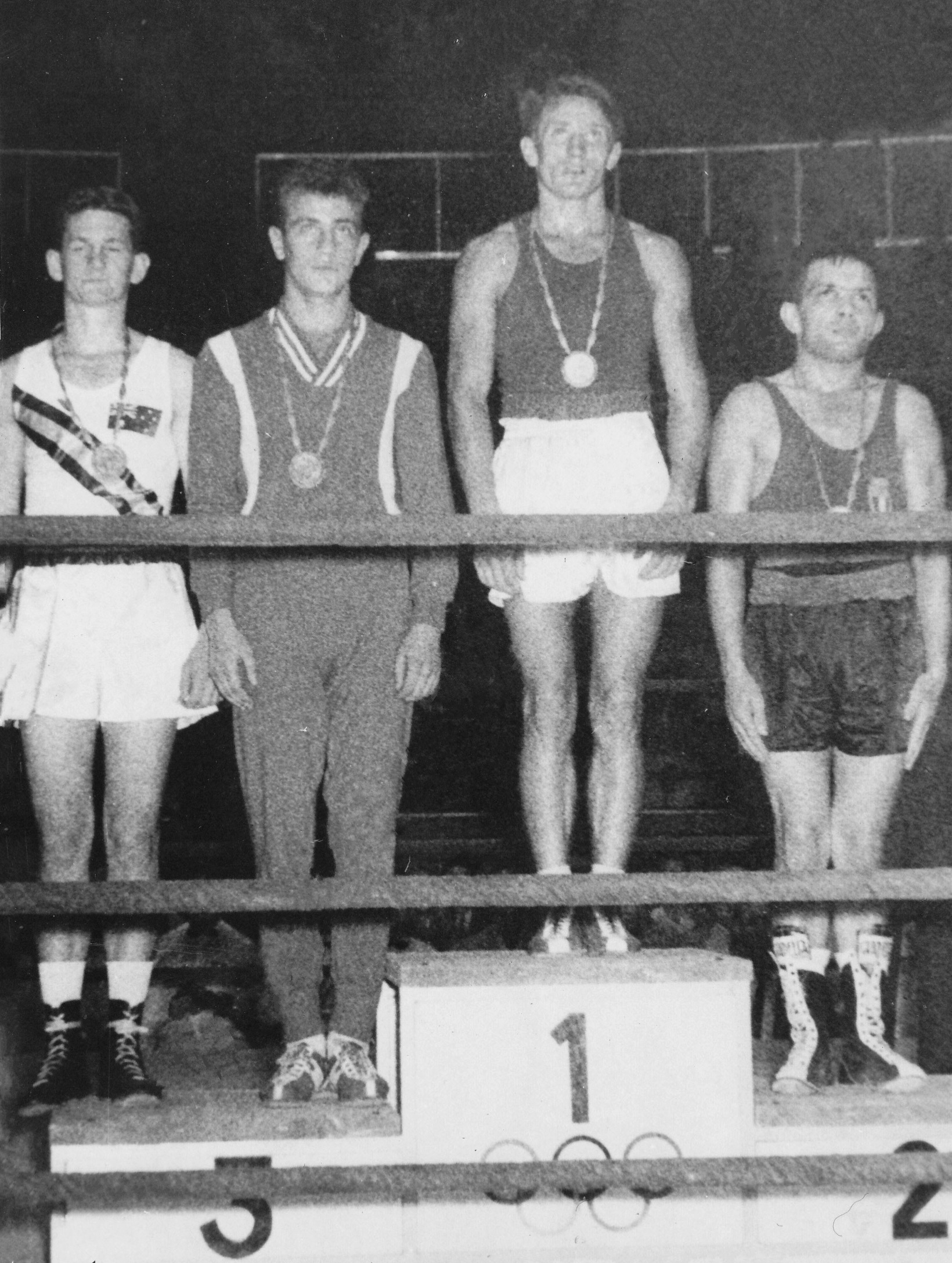
- Bendig (2nd left) at the 1960 Olympics

Personal information
- Born: 6 October 1938 Chełmno, Poland
- Died: 15 September 2006 (aged 67) Gdańsk, Poland
- Height: 169 cm (5 ft 7 in)

Sport
- Sport: Boxing
- Club: Gedania Gdańsk; Polonia Gdańsk
Medal record
Representing Poland
Olympic Games
Bronze medal – third place	1960 Rome	-54 kg
European Championships
Silver medal – second place	1965 East Berlin	-57 kg

Brunon Bendig (6 October 1938 – 15 September 2006) was a Polish amateur boxer who won a silver medal in the featherweight division at the 1965 European Championships. He competed in the 1960 and 1964 Olympics in bantamweight and won a bronze medal in 1960, losing in the semifinal to the eventual winner Oleg Grigoryev. In 1964 he was eliminated in the second bout.

== 1964 Olympic results ==
Below is the record of Brunon Bendig, a Polish bantamweight boxer who competed at the 1964 Tokyo Olympics:

- Round of 32: defeated Rainer Poser (Unified Team of Germany) by decision, 3–2
- Round of 16: lost to Karimu Young (Nigeria) by decision, 2–3
