= Georgi Khristov (gymnast) =

Bulgarian gymnast (born 1938)

- Георги Христов
- Born: 28 April 1938 (age 88) Ruse, Bulgaria

Gymnastics career
- Discipline: Men's artistic gymnastics
- Country represented: Bulgaria

Georgi Khristov (Bulgarian: Георги Христов; born 28 April 1938) is a Bulgarian gymnast. He competed in eight events at the 1960 Summer Olympics.
