= Katsuo Haga =

Japanese boxer

Personal information
- Nationality: Japanese
- Born: 4 December 1938 (age 86); Sendai, Miyagi, Japan

Sport
- Sport: Boxing

Katsuo Haga (芳賀 勝男, Haga Katsuo, born 4 December 1938) is a Japanese boxer. He competed in the men's bantamweight event at the 1960 Summer Olympics.
