= Lars Zebroski =

American cyclist

Personal information
- Born: January 12, 1941 Culver City, California, United States
- Died: January 10, 1998 (aged 56) Palo Alto, California, United States

Cycling career
- Sport: Cycling

Lars Zebroski (January 12, 1941 – January 10, 1998) was an American cyclist. He competed in the individual road race at the 1960 Summer Olympics.
