= Oei Hok Tiang =

Indonesian boxer

Personal information
- Nationality: Indonesian
- Born: 15 August 1932 (age 92)

Sport
- Sport: Boxing

Oei Hok Tiang (born 15 August 1932) is an Indonesian boxer. He competed in the men's bantamweight event at the 1960 Summer Olympics.
