= Kurt Schweiger =

Austrian cyclist

Personal information
- Born: 12 February 1934 (age 92) Pöttsching, Austria

Cycling career
- Sport: Cycling

Kurt Schweiger (born 12 February 1934) is an Austrian former cyclist. He competed in the individual road race and team time trial events at the 1960 Summer Olympics.
