= Lyuben Khristov =

Bulgarian gymnast (born 1935)

- Любен Михайлов Христов
- Full name: Lyuben Mihaylov Hristov
- Born: 15 July 1935 (age 91) Sofia, Bulgaria

Gymnastics career
- Discipline: Men's artistic gymnastics
- Country represented: Bulgaria

Lyuben Mihaylov Hristov (Bulgarian: Любен Михайлов Христов) (born 15 July 1935) is a Bulgarian gymnast. He competed at the 1960 Summer Olympics and the 1964 Summer Olympics.
