= Yevgeny Klevtsov =

Russian cyclist (1929–2003)

Personal information
- Born: 28 March 1929 Oboyan, Russian SFSR, Soviet Union
- Died: 24 March 2003 (aged 73) Oboyan, Russia
- Height: 1.77 m (5 ft 10 in)
- Weight: 76 kg (168 lb)

Sport
- Sport: Cycling
- Club: VS Moscow
Medal record
Representing the Soviet Union
Olympic Games
Bronze medal – third place	1960 Rome	Team time trial

Yevgeny Petrovich Klevtsov (Russian: Евгений Петрович Клевцов; 28 March 1929 – 24 March 2003) was a Russian cyclist. He competed in the individual and team road races at the 1952 Summer Olympics, but without much success. He was selected for the next Olympics, but reportedly refused to go because he would not stand the long trip by sea to Melbourne, Australia. At the next Olympics, he won a bronze medal in the 100 km team time trial. Both in 1952 and 1960 he was the team captain and during the races did his best to "pull" his team mates. In 1952 his efforts were discarded by a crash that involved two riders of his team.

Between 1956 and 1958, he was a leading Soviet rider at the Peace Race, finishing within the top three places in eight stages and winning two stages. He retired shortly after the 1960 Games and worked as bicycle technician at CSKA Moscow. In 2008, an annual road race competition has been established in his native Oboyan in his honor.
