= Gyula Török =

Hungarian boxer (1938–2014)

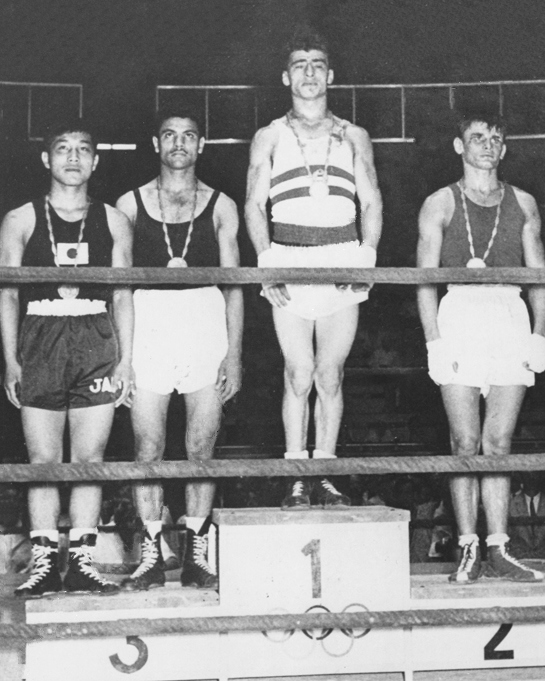
- Török (center) at the 1960 Olympics

Personal information
- Native name: Török Gyula
- Nickname: Béka
- Citizenship: (Hungary) Hungarian
- Born: 24 January 1938 Kispest, Hungary
- Died: 12 January 2014 (aged 75) Budapest, Hungary
- Height: 161 cm (5 ft 3 in)

Sport
- Sport: Boxing
- Club: Magyar Testgyakorlók Köre; Tatabányai Bányász Sport Club
- Partner: Gyuláné Török
Medal record
Representing Hungary
Olympic Games
Gold medal – first place	1960 Rome	-51 kg
European Championships
Silver medal – second place	1959 Lucerne	-51 kg

Gyula Török (24 January 1938 – 12 January 2014) was an Olympic champion Hungarian boxer. Competing in the flyweight division, he won the national title in 1957–58, a silver medal at the 1959 European Championships, and a gold medal at the 1960 Olympics. He subsequently moved to bantamweight and won three more national titles, in 1961, 1962 and 1964. He lost to Italy's Primo Zamparini in a quarter-final of the 1961 European Championships, and to Russia's Oleg Grigoryev in his first bout at the 1964 Olympics. Török retired from competitions in 1966 and for 40 years worked at the Kispest Granite Factory. He simultaneously coached boxers at Építők SC in 1976–78 and at Csepel SC in 1978–81. In the 1990 he also worked for the national boxing team and the Hungarian Boxing Federation. Török was Jewish.

== 1964 Olympic results ==
Below is the record of Gyula Török, a Hungarian bantamweight boxer who competed at the 1964 Tokyo Olympics:

- Round of 32: lost to Oleg Grigoryev (Soviet Union) referee stopped contest
