= Fritz Inthaler =

Austrian cyclist

Personal information
- Born: 19 March 1937 Vienna, Austria
- Died: 11 July 2025 (aged 88) Vienna, Austria

Cycling career
- Sport: Cycling

Fritz Inthaler (19 March 1937 – 11 July 2025) was a former Austrian cyclist. He competed in the individual road race and team time trial events at the 1960 Summer Olympics. His brother, Franz Inthaler, was also a cyclist.
