= Ludovic Zanoni =

Romanian cyclist (1935–2021)

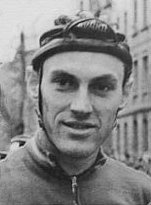
- Zanoni in 1960

Personal information
- Born: 26 June 1935 Arad, Kingdom of Romania
- Died: 27 October 2021 (aged 86) Tărtășești, Romania
- Height: 1.85 m (6 ft 1 in)
- Weight: 73 kg (161 lb)

Sport
- Sport: Cycling

Ludovic Zanoni (26 June 1935 – 27 October 2021) was a Romanian cyclist. He was born in Arad, his profession was as an electrician.

He competed at the 1960 Summer Olympics in the 100 km team time trial and finished in sixth place. He was second in the Tour of Romania in 1955 and 1958.
