= Arnold Ruiner =

Austrian cyclist

Personal information
- Born: 8 February 1937 Vienna, Austria
- Died: 28 October 2011 (aged 74) Willendorf, Austria

Cycling career
- Sport: Cycling

Arnold Ruiner (8 February 1937 – 28 October 2011) was an Austrian cyclist. He competed in the individual road race at the 1960 Summer Olympics. He was born in Vienna, his profession was a locksmith.
