= Patrick Kenny (boxer) =

Irish boxer (1932–2025)

Personal information
- Nationality: Irish
- Born: 17 August 1934 Cork, Ireland
- Died: 1 February 2025 (aged 90) Coventry, England

Sport
- Sport: Boxing

Patrick "Paddy" Kenny (17 August 1934 – 1 February 2025) was an Irish boxer. He competed in the men's bantamweight event at the 1960 Summer Olympics. Kenny died on 1 February 2025, at the age of 90.
