= Gerhard Huska =

Austrian sailor

Gerhard Huska (26 March 1939 – 7 March 1987) was an Austrian yacht racer who competed in the 1960 Summer Olympics. He was born in Vienna.
