= Sanusi (cyclist) =

Indonesian cyclist (1933–2018)

Personal information
- Born: 2 February 1933 Medan, Indonesia
- Died: 1 June 2018 (aged 85) Deli Serdang, Indonesia

Cycling career
- Sport: Cycling

Sanusi (2 February 1933 – 1 June 2018) was an Indonesian cyclist. He competed in the individual road race and team time trial events at the 1960 Summer Olympics.
