= Theo Polhaupessy =

Indonesian cyclist

Personal information
- Born: 5 June 1933 (age 93) Malang, Indonesia

Cycling career
- Sport: Cycling

Theo Polhaupessy (born 5 June 1933) is a former Indonesian cyclist. He competed in the individual road race and team time trial events at the 1960 Summer Olympics.
