= Victor Vincente of America =

American cyclist

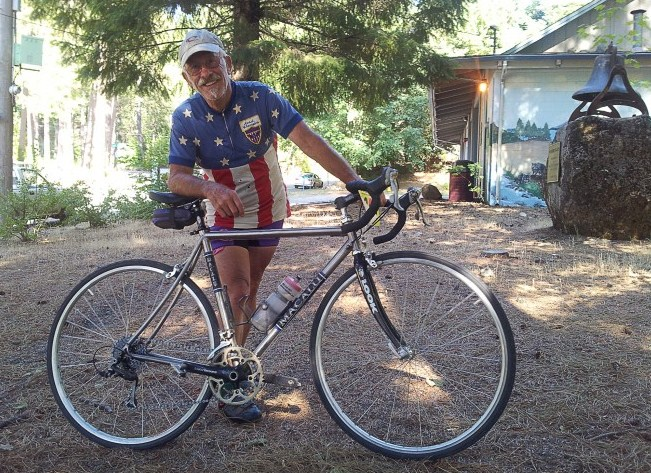
- Victor in his 1965 National Road Championship jersey

Personal information
- Born: Michael Beckwith Hiltner; March 7, 1941 (age 85) Los Angeles, California, U.S.

Cycling career
- Sport: Cycling
Medal record
Representing United States
Pan American Games
Silver medal – second place	1963	Team road race

Victor Vincente of America also known as VVA, born as Michael Beckwith Hiltner (born March 7, 1941), is an American author, poet, designer, and cyclist credited with being a creator of the mountain bike.

== Athlete ==
=== Road racing ===
Victor began riding and racing with the Santa Monica Cycling Club on a road bike at the age of 16 in Santa Monica, California. He entered his first competition on the Fourth of July, 1957, under his birth name of Michael Beckwith Hiltner. He was first Junior (under 17 years of age) to reach the finish line at the 50-mile southern California road racing championships at the end of that summer, with only one rider, Bob Teztlaff, a Senior, ahead of him. The momentum continued to build as he eventually made it to the 1959 Tour du St-Laurent in Canada where he won four of the ten stages and the general classification (GC). This set the stage for Victor’s international recognition.

From this auspicious beginning he went on to an eleven-year cycling career. Highlights include a national road cycling championships title, four California titles, a North America hillclimb championship title, berths on two USA Olympics teams, two Pan American Games teams, and victories in Italy. At the 1963 Pan American Games in São Paulo, Brazil, he met Neide Marchena, a Brazilian telephone operator. Although they did not speak each other's language, they became engaged the same year, and married shortly after that.

Victor was inducted into the Modern 1945-1975 Competitor category of the United States Bicycling Hall of Fame in 2001.

=== Double-transcontinental record and the VVA name ===
In 1974, Victor established the double-transcontinental record by cycling from Santa Monica, California to Atlantic City, New Jersey, and back to Santa Monica, covering the distance in 36 days, 8 hours. This achievement prompted him to change his name, and so he adopted the title Victor Vincente of America, two ways of saying "winning."

=== Mountain biking ===
During a recreational ride one day in 1978, descending a residential canyon road into the San Fernando Valley, in southern California, the pavement unexpectedly ended and Victor found himself riding down a dirt road. A sharp rock blew his front tire within a mile, and it was this upset that led to his independent development of bicycles suited for dirt roads and trails.

In 1980, Victor established the Reseda to the Sea event which still carries on today, the most recent edition being on March 9, 2019. He also promoted Puerco!, Mt. Wilson hillclimb and downhill, Sespe Hot Springs Two-Stage, and two supported tours: Pirú-Cuyamá Overland, and Haute Route. Victor was inducted into the Mountain Bike Hall of Fame in 1989.

== Designer ==
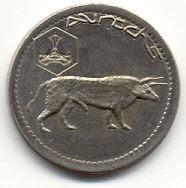
Coin designed and created by Victor Vincente of America

Victor has created a multi-faceted body of work, ranging from coins to electronic jewelry, mountain bikes, human-powered vehicles, garments, posters, and graphic art.

=== Mountain bikes ===
His bicycle building years were from 1979 to 1991. In conjunction with Victor’s love of cycling, he designed various models of mountain bikes, beginning with 'Topanga!' in 1979 which featured 20” wheels with 1 X 7 gearing, followed by Palisadian in 1981 (24” wheels), VVA-26 Semi-Custom Dirt Road Bicycle in 1982 (26” wheels), Colt 20/20 in 1982 (20” wheels, a hillclimb-specific bicycle), and 1991 in 1991 (26” wheels).

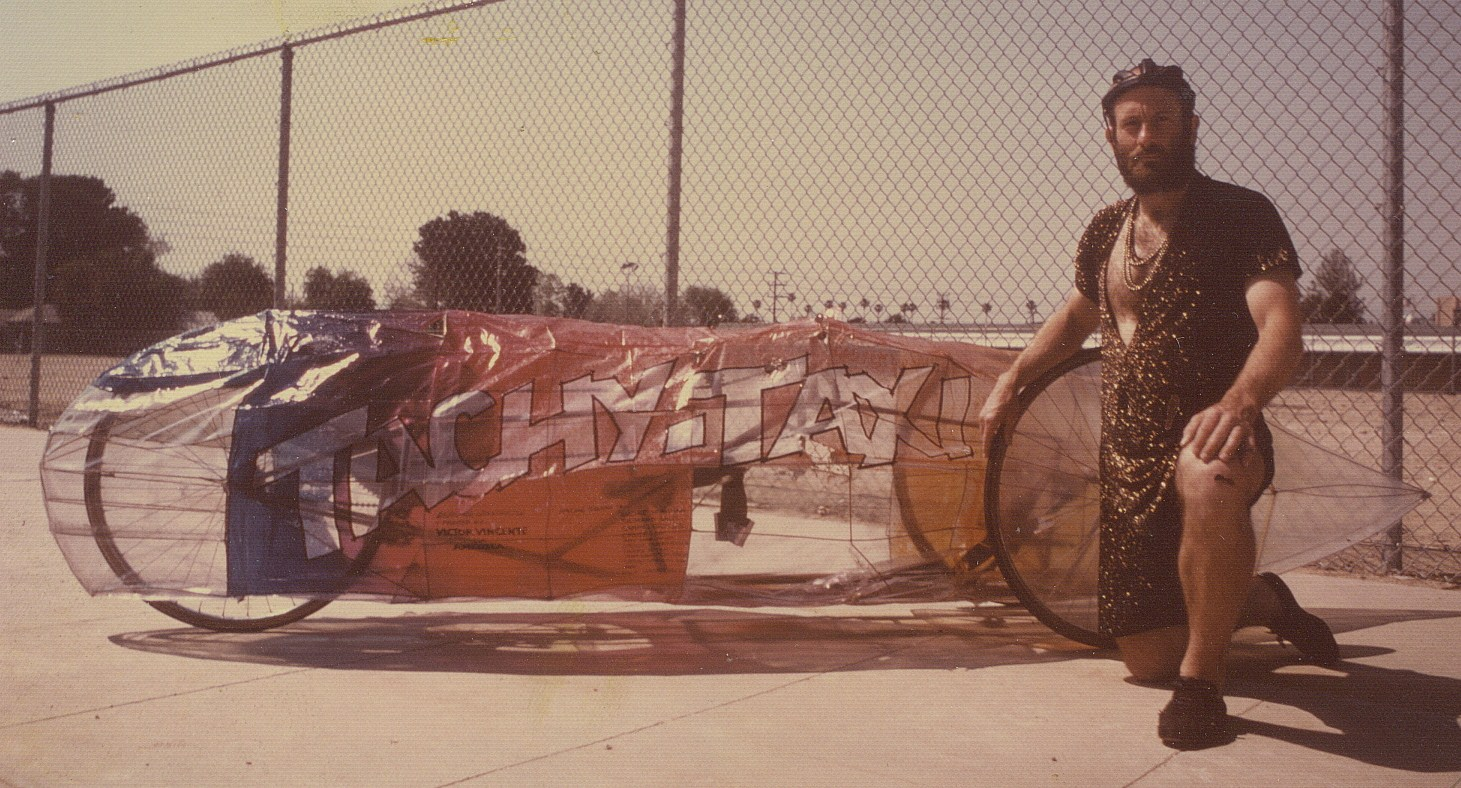
Victor Vincente of America with Tachy Taxi I

=== Human-powered vehicles ===
Lured by the possibility of becoming the world's fastest human, Victor designed two machines. The first of these, Tachy Taxi (from Greek: "speed," and "travel"), he entered in the First International Human-Powered Vehicle Championships in 1975, where his crash into spectators ended his bid for glory. Later, in 1979, Tachy Taxi Two, which he designed to run on rails in order to eliminate all steering problems, crashed into the cameraman who was standing over the rails at the finish line, using a telephoto lens.

== Author ==
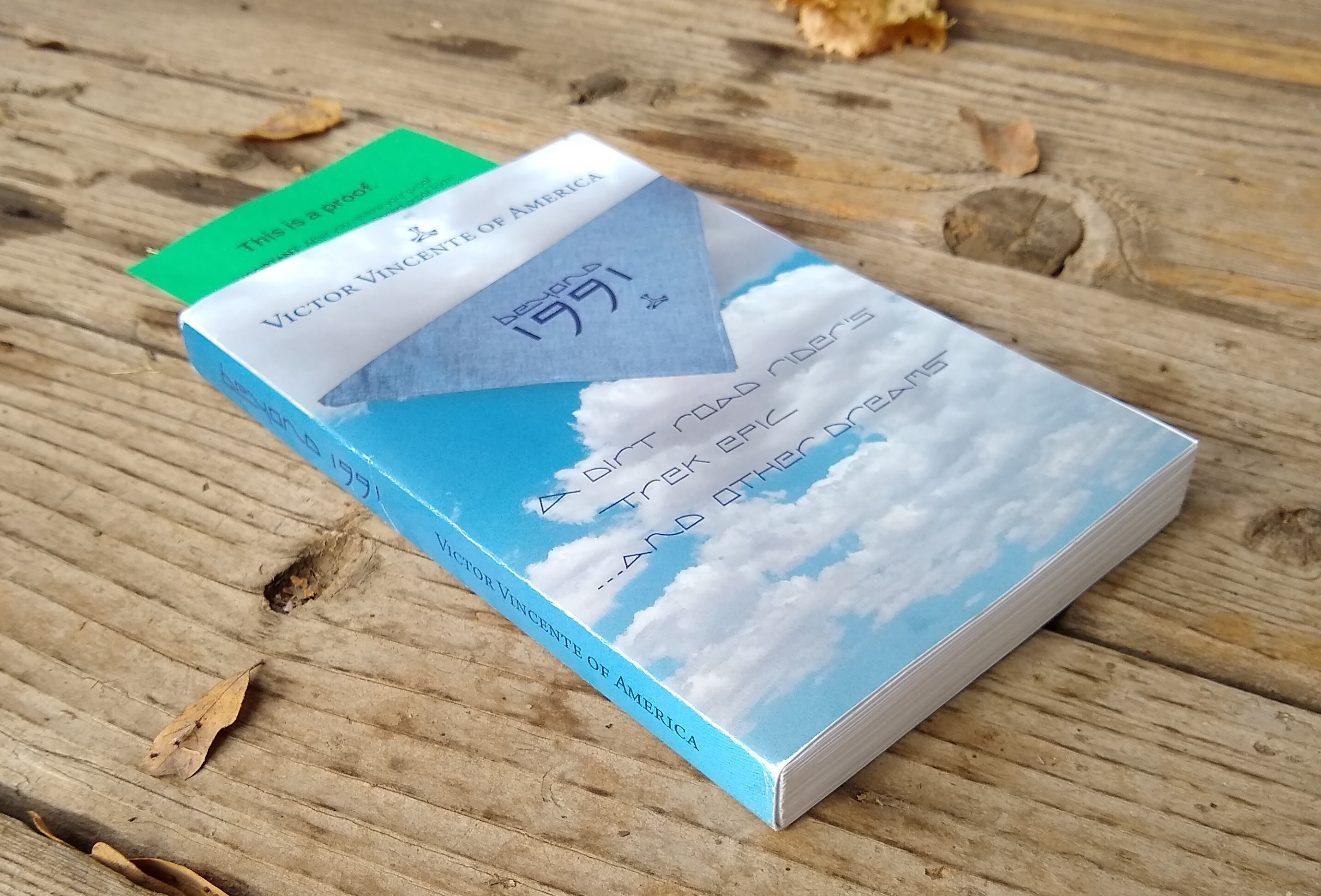
Beyond 1991: A Dirt Rider's Trek Epic... And Other Dreams

- The First Thing To Go (2018), a memoir
- Water Before Tea (2016), an autobiography
- Beyond 1991: A Dirt Road Rider's Trek Epic, and Other Dreams (1998)
- 1991: Selected Verses (and Art) of Victor Vincente Of America (1979)
- Coloring Book (1978)

== Major results ==
=== Road racing ===
1957
1st Southern California junior road championship

1958
1st Tijuana - Tecate, Mexico
2nd Southern California road championship
1st All-California road championship

1959
1st Tour du St-Laurent, Canada
Member Pan American team, Chicago
2nd Southern California road championship

1960
1st Bouquet Canyon B.A.R.
1st Tour of Somerville, New Jersey
1st Olympic trials 100-kilometer time trial, teamed with Lars Zebroski
11th Olympic Games, Rome, Italy, 100-kilometer team time trial

1961
1st Circuito di Monsummano, Italy
1st Quarrata, Italy
1st San Casciano, Italy
1st Calcinaia, Italy
World Championship competitor, Bern, Switzerland

1962
2nd Quebec - Montreal, Canada

1963
1st Santa Monica Cycling Club 10-mile time trial championship, Malibu
1st Santa Monica Cycling Club championship (clean sweep): road, sprint, and cyclocross
2nd Pan American Games, São Paulo, Brazil, road race team placing

1964
Member Olympic team, Tokyo, Japan
1st Southern California road championship
1st Santa Monica Cycling Club hillclimb championship, Piuma Canyon

1965
1st Southern California road championship
1st National Championship, Los Angeles, California
1st North America hillclimb championship, Mt. Evans, Colorado
World Championship competitor, San Sebastian, Spain

1966
3rd Münster city track championship, Germany
1st Circuito di Salsomaggiore, Italy
1st Oltrarno, Italy
World championship competitor at The Nürburgring, Nürburg, Germany

1967
2nd São Caetano, Brazil

=== Mountain biking ===
1980
1st Mt. Wilson hillclimb
1st Sespe Hot Springs Two-Stage

1984
1st Brian Skinner Widowmaker

1986
1st Mt. Baldy (Mt. San Antonio) hillclimb
