= Petar Tachev =

Bulgarian weightlifter

Personal information
- Nationality: Bulgarian
- Born: 23 July 1938 (age 86); Veliko Tarnovo, Bulgaria

Sport
- Sport: Weightlifting

Petar Tachev (Bulgarian: Петър Тачев, born 23 July 1938) is a Bulgarian weightlifter. He competed at the 1960 Summer Olympics and the 1964 Summer Olympics.
