= Vagn Bangsborg =

Danish cyclist

Personal information
- Born: 28 May 1936 (age 90) Slagelse, Denmark

Cycling career
- Sport: Cycling

Vagn Bangsborg (born 28 May 1936) is a Danish former cyclist. He competed in the team time trial at the 1960 Summer Olympics.
