= Oliver Taylor (boxer) =

Australian boxer

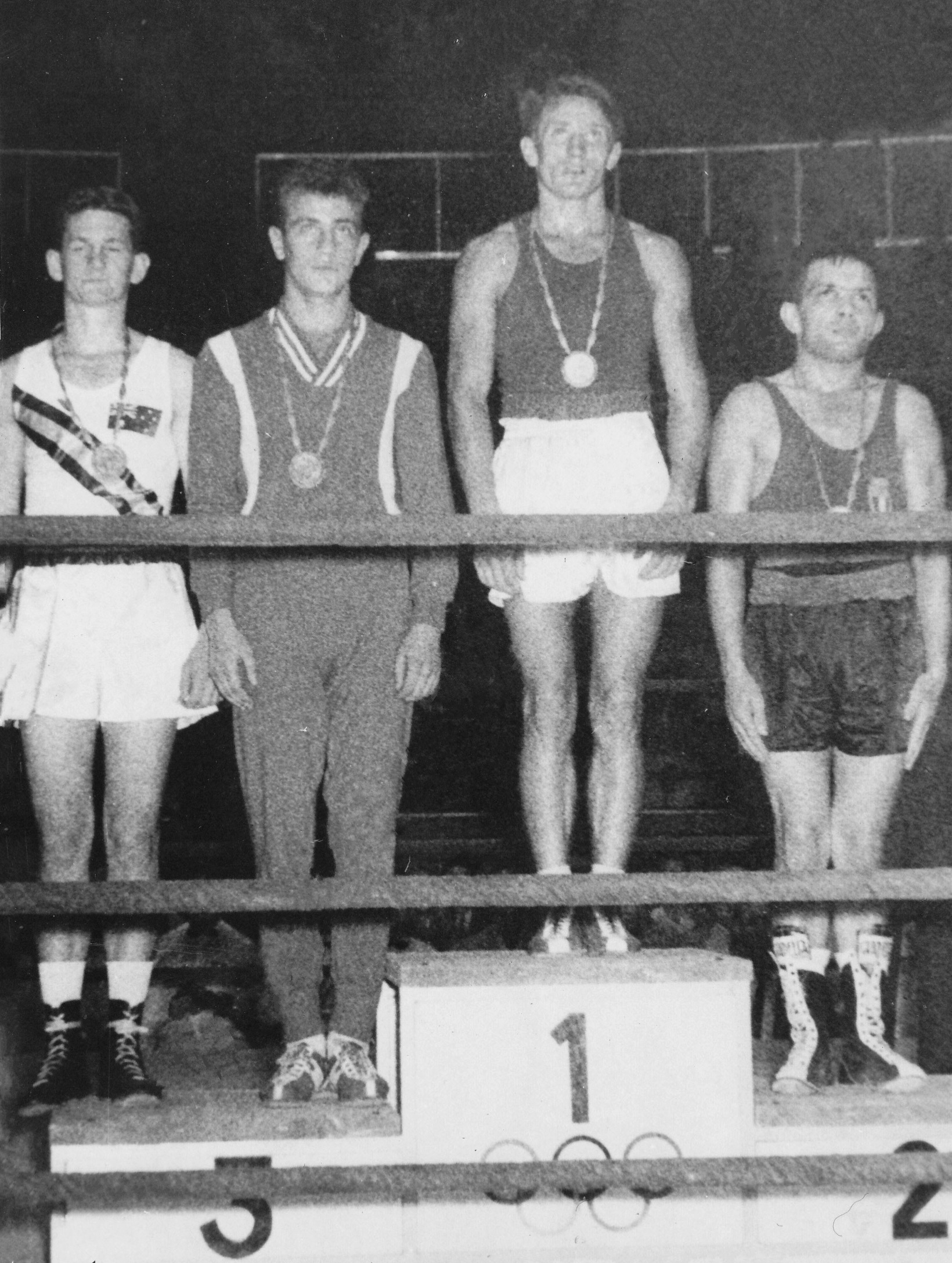
- Taylor (left) at the 1960 Olympics

Personal information
- Born: 19 February 1938 Townsville, Queensland, Australia
- Died: 30 December 2000 (aged 62)
- Height: 170 cm (5 ft 7 in)

Sport
- Sport: Boxing
Medal record
Men's boxing
Representing Australia
Summer Olympics
Bronze medal – third place	1960 Rome	-54 kg
British Empire Games
Silver medal – second place	1958 Cardiff	-54 kg

Oliver William Taylor (19 February 1938 – 30 December 2000) was an Australian bantamweight boxer. He won a silver medal at the 1958 British Empire and Commonwealth Games and a bronze at the 1960 Olympics, before turning professional. He is the older brother of Australian National Boxing Hall of Fame inductee Wally Taylor.
