= Kurt Postl =

Austrian cyclist

Personal information
- Born: 13 August 1937 (age 89) Vienna, Austria

Cycling career
- Sport: Cycling

Kurt Postl (born 13 August 1937) is a former Austrian cyclist. He competed in the individual road race and team time trial events at the 1960 Summer Olympics.
