= Dimitar Kotev =

Bulgarian cyclist (1941–2001)

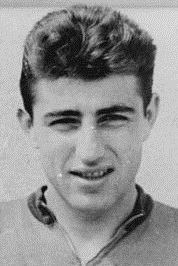
- Dimitar Kotev in 1961

Personal information
- Born: 3 March 1941 Sofia, Bulgaria
- Died: 8 November 2001 (aged 60)
- Height: 1.83 m (6 ft 0 in)
- Weight: 82 kg (181 lb)

Sport
- Sport: Cycling

Dimitar Kotev (Bulgarian: Димитър Котев) (3 March 1941 – 8 November 2001) was a Bulgarian cyclist. He competed at the 1960 Summer Olympics in the individual road race and in the 100 km team time trial and finished in 17th place in the latter event. He had second-third places at some stages of the Peace Race in 1956, 1962 and 1969.
