= Frankie Taylor =

British boxer

Personal information
- Nationality: British (English)
- Born: 2 September 1942 Lancaster, England
- Died: 17 July 2025 (aged 82) Heysham, England

Sport
- Sport: Boxing

Francis J. Taylor (born 2 September 1942) was a British boxer. He competed in the men's bantamweight event at the 1960 Summer Olympics. He fought as Frankie Taylor.

He won the 1960 Amateur Boxing Association British bantamweight title, when boxing out of the Lancaster Lads ABC.

He died Thursday 17th July 2025 in Heysham, England.
