= Stoyan Georgiev Demirev =

Bulgarian cyclist

Personal information
- Born: 1 June 1932 (age 94) Razgrad, Bulgaria

Cycling career
- Sport: Cycling

Stoyan Georgiev Demirev (Bulgarian: Стоян Георгиев Демирев; born 1 June 1932) is a former Bulgarian cyclist. He competed in the individual road race and team time trial events at the 1960 Summer Olympics.
