= René Rutschmann =

Swiss cyclist

Personal information
- Born: 7 January 1941 (age 85) Winterthur, Switzerland

Cycling career
- Sport: Cycling

René Rutschmann (born 7 January 1941) is a former Swiss cyclist. He competed at the 1960 Summer Olympics and the 1964 Summer Olympics.
