= Niels Baunsøe =

Danish cyclist

Personal information
- Full name: Niels Baunsøe
- Born: 29 June 1939 Frederiksberg, Denmark
- Died: 12 March 2012 (aged 72)

Cycling career
- Sport: Cycling

Niels Baunsøe (29 June 1939 – 12 March 2012) was a Danish cyclist. He competed in the team time trial at the 1960 Summer Olympics.
