= Thein Myint =

Burmese boxer

Personal information
- Born: January 14, 1937 (age 89) Yangon, Burma, British India
Medal record
Men's Boxing
Representing Burma
Asian Games
| Gold medal – first place | 1958 Tokyo | Bantamweight |

Thein Myint (Burmese: သိန်းမြင့်) born January 14, 1937, in Yangon) is a retired amateur boxer from Burma, who won the gold medal at the 1958 Asian Games in the men's bantamweight (– 54 kg) division. He represented his native country at three consecutive Summer Olympics, starting in 1956.

== 1960 Olympic results ==
Below is the record of Thein Myint, a Burmese bantamweight boxer who competed at the 1960 Rome Olympics:

- Round of 32: defeated Charles Reiff (Luxembourg) by decision, 5-0
- Round of 16: defeated Muhammad Nasir (Pakistan) by decision, 5-0
- Quarterfinal: lost to Oleg Grigoryev (Soviet Union) by walkover

== 1964 Olympic results ==
Below is the record of Thein Myint, a Burmese bantamweight boxer who competed at the 1964 Tokyo Olympics:

- Round of 32: lost to Isaac Aryee (Ghana) by knockout
