= Ion Cosma =

Romanian cyclist

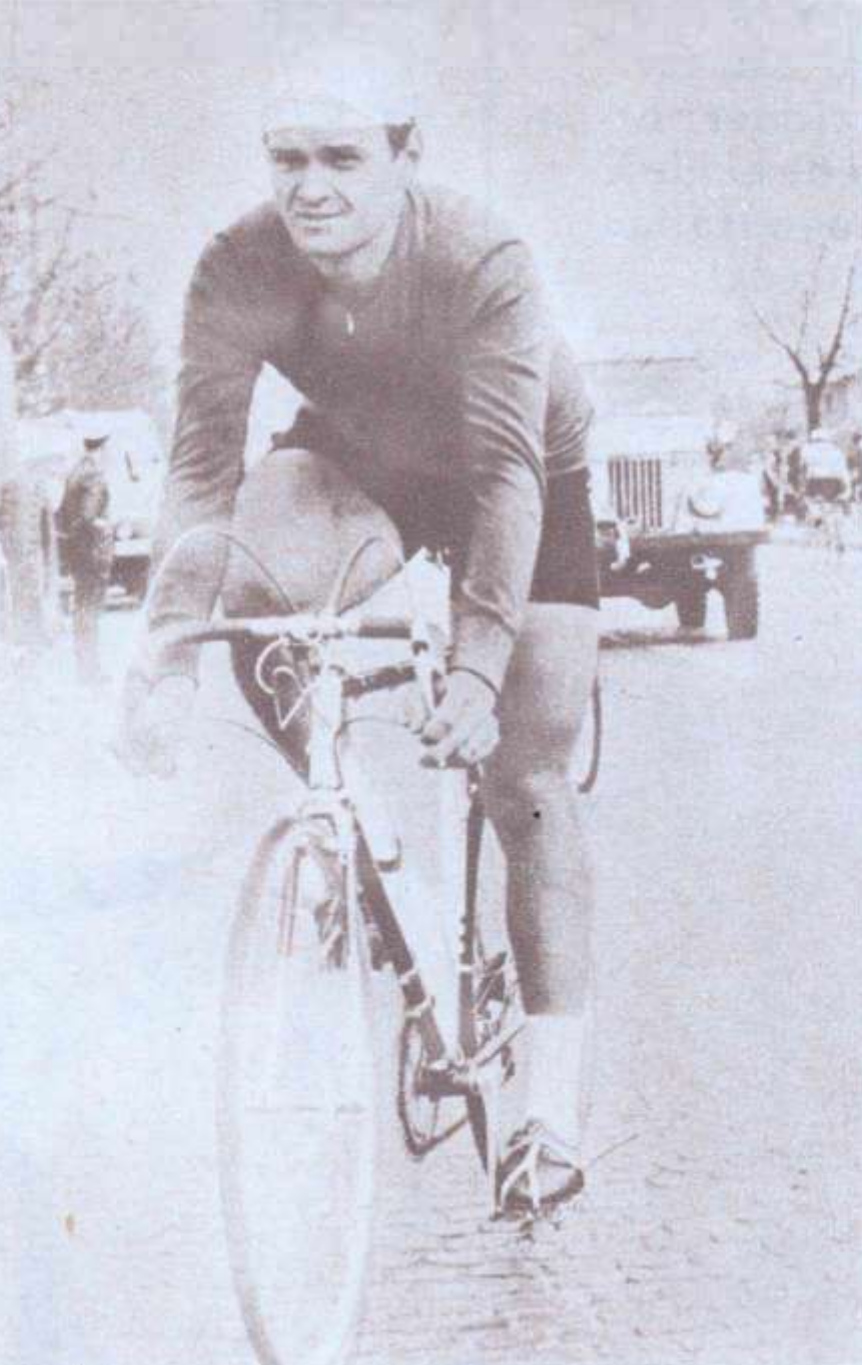
- Cosma in 1967

Personal information
- Born: 11 July 1937 Târgu Mureș, Romania
- Died: 1997
- Height: 1.80 m (5 ft 11 in)
- Weight: 82 kg (181 lb)

Sport
- Sport: Cycling

Ion Cosma (11 July 1937, Bucharest - 1997) was a Romanian cyclist. He competed at the 1960 and 1964 Summer Olympics in the 100 km team time trial and in the individual road race. In 1960 he finished in sixth and fifth place, whereas in 1964 he was ninth and 59th, respectively. He won the Tour of Romania in 1959 and 1961 and the multistage race Cupa UCECOM in 1963.

He started at Peace-Race four times: 1961 -7. he won one Stage; 1962 - DNF, 1963 - 26., 1967 - 40.
