= Peter Weiss (boxer) =

Austrian boxer (1938–2021)

Personal information
- Nationality: Austrian
- Born: 16 December 1938 Berlin, Germany
- Died: 27 March 2021 (aged 82) Vienna, Austria
- Height: 1.69 m (5 ft 7 in)
- Weight: Bantamweight; Featherweight

Boxing career

Peter Weiss (16 December 1938 – 27 March 2021) was a German-born Austrian amateur boxer. He competed at the 1960 Summer Olympics as a bantamweight and the 1964 Summer Olympics as a featherweight.

== Early life ==
Weiss was born on 16 December 1938, in Berlin, Germany. His father was Ernst Weiss (1912–1997), a professional boxer.

== Career ==
Weiss followed in his father's footsteps and started boxing in 1958. He represented Austria at the 1960 Summer Olympics in Rome and won his first round bout by outpointing the Indonesian Tiang Hok Oei. Weiss lost the second-bout to Alfonso Carbajo and thus, got eliminated. Four years later he competed once again in The Olympics at Tokyo, he lost his first-round bout against Tunisian Tamar Ben Hassan.

== Personal life ==
After his boxing career, Weiss became a coach at the University of Vienna and ran the Papageno Hotel in Vienna. He died of natural causes on 27 March 2021, at the age of 82.
