= Jerry Armstrong =

American boxer (1936–2023)

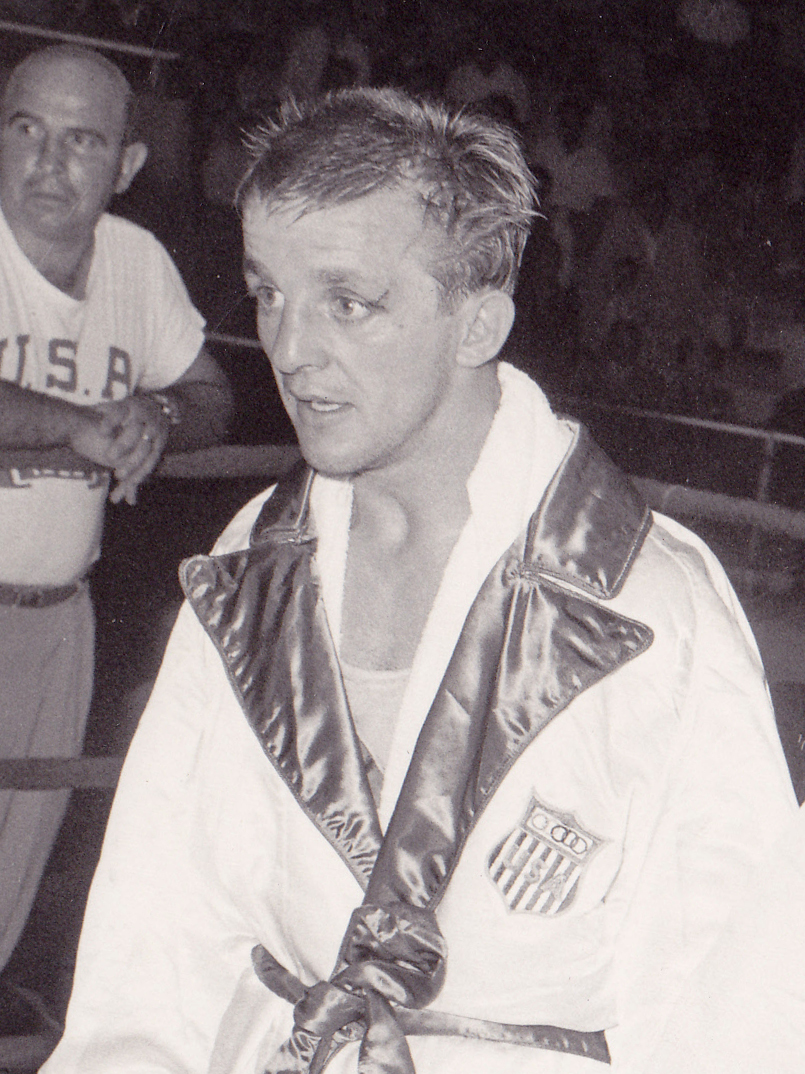
- Armstrong at the 1960 Olympics

Personal information
- Born: June 26, 1936 Petoskey, Michigan, U.S.
- Died: May 7, 2023 (aged 86) Garden City, Idaho, U.S.
- Height: 1.61 m (5 ft 3 in)
- Weight: 54 kg (119 lb)

Sport
- Sport: Boxing
- Club: Idaho State University

Jerry Lee Armstrong (June 26, 1936 – May 7, 2023) was an American amateur boxer. He competed in the bantamweight division at the 1960 Summer Olympics and finished in fifth place.

Armstrong served with the U.S. Army and then graduated from Idaho State College. He later worked for 29 years at the Idaho Department of Health and Welfare, retiring in 1998 as personnel director. In the meantime he also refereed about 100 professional boxing matches. In 1980 he was inducted to the Idaho State University Hall of Fame.

Armstrong died of Alzheimer's disease in Garden City, Idaho, on May 7, 2023, at the age of 86.
