= Deaths in October 2006 =

The following is a list of notable deaths in October 2006.

Entries for each day are listed alphabetically by surname. A typical entry lists information in the following sequence:

- Name, age, country of citizenship at birth, subsequent country of citizenship (if applicable), reason for notability, cause of death (if known), and reference.

== October 2006 ==
=== 1 ===
- Frank Beyer, 74, German film director (Jacob the Liar).
- Sir Laurence Brodie-Hall, 96, Australian mining executive.
- Alan Caillou, 91, British actor and writer.
- Pierre Gorman, 82, Australian librarian and academic.
- Jack Kirkbride, 83, British cartoonist.
- Anna Kunkel, 74, American baseball player (South Bend Blue Sox).
- Atanas Mihaylov, 57, Bulgarian footballer and Olympian (1968).
- Juan Morera, 59, Spanish Olympic handball player (1972).
- Renato Polselli, 84, Italian film director (The Vampire and the Ballerina, Black Magic Rites).
- Rafael Quintero, 66, Cuban-born American CIA agent.
- André Viger, 54, Canadian wheelchair marathoner and paralympian, cancer.
- Yoshihiro Yonezawa, 53, Japanese manga critic, lung cancer.

=== 2 ===
- Marta Fernandez Miranda de Batista, 82, Cuban First Lady (1952–1959), second wife of President Fulgencio Batista.
- Frances Bergen, 84, American actress, wife of ventriloquist Edgar Bergen and mother of actress Candice Bergen.
- Helen Chenoweth-Hage, 68, American Republican Representative for Idaho (1995–2001), car accident.
- Anselmo Citterio, 79, Italian Olympic cyclist (1948).
- Bhaktisvarupa Damodar Swami, 68, Indian scientist, spiritual teacher and poet, heart attack.
- Tamara Dobson, 59, American actress (Cleopatra Jones), complications from pneumonia and multiple sclerosis.
- Paul Halmos, 90, Hungarian-born American mathematician.
- Al Heist, 78, American baseball player (Chicago Cubs, Houston Colt .45s).
- Paul Richardson, 74, American organist (Philadelphia Phillies), prostate cancer.
- Koh Eng Tong, 89, Malaysian weightlifter and Olympian (1956).
- Clyde Vollmer, 85, American baseball player (Cincinnati Reds, Washington Senators, Boston Red Sox).

=== 3 ===
- Lucilla Andrews, 86, British romantic novelist.
- Sir John Cox, 77, British admiral.
- John Crank, 90, British mathematical physicist.
- Knud Ditlevsen, 81, Danish Olympic canoeist (1948).
- Darius Helton, 52, American football player (North Carolina Central Eagles, Kansas City Chiefs).
- Gwen Meredith, 98, Australian writer (Blue Hills).
- Peter Norman, 64, Australian athlete and Olympic silver medalist (1968), heart attack.
- Don Thompson, 73, British race walker and Olympian (1956, 1960, 1964), aneurysm.

=== 4 ===
- Gunnar Åkerlund, 82, Swedish canoeist and Olympian (1948, 1952).
- R. W. Apple Jr., 71, American political journalist and food writer (The New York Times), thoracic cancer.
- Tom Bell, 73, British actor (Wish You Were Here, Prime Suspect), after short illness.
- Victor Dyrgall, 88, American Olympic runner (1952).
- František Fajtl, 94, Czech World War II fighter pilot, after long illness.
- Norbert Franck, 88, Luxembourgish Olympic swimmer (1936).
- Walter Gibb, 87, British aviator and test pilot who twice held the world flight altitude record.
- Ralph Griswold, 72, American creator of Snobol and Icon programming languages, cancer.
- Vic Heyliger, 94, American ice hockey Hall of Fame player (Chicago Black Hawks), and coach.
- Stefan Masztak, 79, Polish Olympic sports shooter (1960).
- Oskar Pastior, 78, Romanian-born German writer.
- Riccardo Pazzaglia, 80, Italian actor, writer and film director.
- Katarina Tomasevski, 53, Croatian former United Nations Special Rapporteur on the Right to Education.

=== 5 ===
- Miroslav Brozović, 89, Yugoslav footballer and Olympian (1948).
- Cleveland Buckner, 68, American basketball player (Jackson State Tigers, New York Knicks).
- Valerie Campbell-Harding, 74, Canadian textile art designer, heart attack.
- Friedrich Karl Flick, 79, German-Austrian billionaire industrialist.
- George King, 78, American college basketball coach (West Virginia Mountaineers, Purdue Boilermakers).
- Speedy Long, 78, American politician, Representative for Louisiana (1964–1972).
- Jennifer Moss, 61, British actress (Coronation Street).
- Antonio Peña, 55, Mexican promoter of Lucha Libre AAA World Wide, heart attack.
- Jackie Rae, 85, Canadian singer, songwriter and entertainer.
- Dick Wagner, 78, American baseball executive, president of the Cincinnati Reds and Houston Astros.
- Gilbert F. White, 94, American geographer.

=== 6 ===
- Bertha Brouwer, 75, Dutch athlete and Olympian (1952).
- Charles Clark, 73, British publisher and lawyer.
- Ted Doyle, 92, American football player (Pittsburgh Pirates/Steelers, Steagles, Card-Pitt).
- Julen Goikoetxea, 21, Spanish cyclist.
- Claude Luter, 83, French jazz clarinetist and bandleader.
- Eduardo Mignogna, 66, Argentinian film director.
- Buck O'Neil, 94, American baseball player and manager in the Negro leagues, heart failure and bone marrow cancer.
- Timo Sarpaneva, 79, Finnish glassmaker.
- Louis Van Schil, 84, Belgian Olympic cyclist (1948).
- Heinz Sielmann, 89, German zoologist.
- Wilson Tucker, 91, American science fiction writer.

=== 7 ===
- Charlie Bradberry, 24, American NASCAR driver, car accident.
- Dan Campilan, 25, Filipino news reporter (24 Oras), traffic collision.
- Polly Craus, 83, American Olympic fencer (1952).
- Craig Dobbin, 71, Canadian founder of CHC Helicopter, after illness following lung transplant.
- Julen Goikoetxea, 21, Spanish bicycle racer, suicide by jumping.
- Anna Politkovskaya, 48, Russian journalist, shot.
- Peter H. Rossi, 84, American sociologist.
- Shishihō Yoshimasa, 51, Japanese sumo wrestler.

=== 8 ===
- Bob Cunningham, 79, Canadian football player.
- Ira B. Harkey Jr., 88, American newspaper editor, winner of the 1963 Pulitzer Prize for Editorial Writing.
- Pavol Hnilica, 85, Slovak Catholic bishop.
- Ivan Murrell, 63, Panamanian-born American baseball player (Houston Colt .45's/Astros, San Diego Padres, Atlanta Braves).
- Mark Porter, 32, New Zealand racing driver, race crash.
- Michel Roques, 60, French cyclist.

=== 9 ===
- Sedat Alp, 93, Turkish archaeologist specializing in Hittitology.
- Rune Andersson, 76, Swedish rower and Olympian (1952, 1956, 1960).
- Lorne Bonnell, 83, Canadian politician, member of the Senate of Canada (1971-1998).
- Coccinelle, 75, French transsexual singer, stroke.
- Reg Freeson, 80, British politician, Minister of State for Housing and Local Government (1974–1979).
- Marek Grechuta, 60, Polish singer, composer and lyricist. (Polish)
- Danièle Huillet, 70, French filmmaker, cancer.
- Paul Hunter, 27, British snooker player, neuroendocrine tumours.
- Mario Moya Palencia, 73, Mexican politician and diplomat (Interior Minister, 1969–1976), heart attack.
- Glenn Myernick, 51, American assistant soccer coach of the men's national team, heart attack.
- Ray Noorda, 82, American computer executive, CEO of Novell (1982–1994).
- Kanshi Ram, 72, Indian politician, heart attack.

=== 10 ===
- Sheikh Akijuddin, 76–77, Bangladeshi entrepreneur.
- Jerry Belson, 68, American television writer (The Tracey Ullman Show, The Dick Van Dyke Show) and screenwriter (Fun with Dick and Jane), prostate cancer.
- Francis Berry, 91, British poet and literary critic.
- P. C. Devassia, 100, Indian Sanskrit scholar and poet, won 1980 Sahitya Akademi Award (Kristubhagavatam).
- Sir Derek Pattinson, 76, British Secretary-General of the General Synod of the Church of England (1972–1990)
- Michael John Rogers, 74, British ornithologist.
- Ian Scott, 72, Canadian Attorney General of Ontario (1985–1990).
- Ravindra Varma, 81, Indian politician.
- Monique Viner, 80, British judge.

=== 11 ===
- Henry Caldera, 69, Sri Lankan singer, cancer.
- Sir Victor Goodhew, 86, British politician, Conservative MP for St Albans (1959–1983).
- Howard Kerzner, 42, South African businessman, helicopter crash.
- Cory Lidle, 34, American baseball player (New York Yankees), victim of the 2006 New York City plane crash.
- Benito Martínez, 126, Cuban claimant to the title of world's oldest person.
- Sir Robert Megarry, 96, British judge and Vice-Chancellor of the Supreme Court (1982–1985).
- Eddie Pellagrini, 88, American baseball player (Boston Red Sox, Pittsburgh Pirates) and coach (Boston College).
- Jimmy Peters Sr., 84, Canadian ice hockey player (Montreal Canadiens, Detroit Red Wings, Boston Bruins).
- Raad Mutar Saleh, Iraqi Mandaean leader, shot.
- Jacques Sternberg, 83, French science fiction and fantastique author, lung cancer.
- John Turvey, 61, Canadian youth activist and Order of Canada recipient, mitochondrial myopathy.

=== 12 ===
- Carlo Acutis, 15, English-born Italian Catholic computer programmer.
- Todd Bolender, 92, American dancer and choreographer, director of the Kansas City Ballet.
- Johnny Callison, 67, American baseball player (Philadelphia Phillies, Chicago White Sox, New York Yankees).
- Samuel B. Casey Jr., 79, American businessman, CEO of Pullman Company.
- Hermann Eilts, 84, German-born American diplomat and US ambassador to Saudi Arabia (1965–1970).
- Sherman Glenn Finesilver, 79, American district judge (United States District Court for the District of Colorado).
- Adolf Lauda, 88, Austrian Olympic equestrian (1956).
- Darrell Lester, 65, American football player (Minnesota Vikings, Denver Broncos).
- Angelika Machinek, 49, German glider pilot, five times national champion and holder of nine world records, air crash.
- Eugène Martin, 91, French racing driver.
- Gerard Murphy, 57, Irish mathematician.
- Gillo Pontecorvo, 86, Italian film director (The Battle of Algiers), heart failure.

=== 13 ===
- Mason Andrews, 87, American physician and politician who delivered America's first test tube baby, Mayor of Norfolk, Virginia (1992–1994).
- Deborah Blumer, 64, American member of the Massachusetts General Court, heart attack.
- Luigi Bosco, 84, Italian footballer.
- Doug Buhr, 57, Canadian ice hockey player (Kansas City Scouts).
- Petra Cabot, 99, American designer, created the Skotch Kooler, natural causes.
- Bob Lassiter, 61, American talk radio personality.
- Dino Monduzzi, 84, Italian cardinal, Prefect of the Pontifical Household (1986–1998).
- Joe Szura, 67, Canadian ice hockey player (California Golden Seals/Oakland Seals, Los Angeles Sharks, Houston Aeros).
- Hilda Terry, 92, American cartoonist, creator of comic strip Teena.
- Sir Anthony Tippet, 78, British admiral.
- Wang Guangmei, 85, Chinese wife of late Communist leader Liu Shaoqi.

=== 14 ===
- Bernard Allen, 69, American member of the North Carolina General Assembly.
- James Barr, 82, British Old Testament scholar.
- Chun Wei Cheung, 34, Dutch rowing cox, and Olympic medalist (2004), liver cancer.
- Gino Empry, 81, Canadian entertainment publicist and manager
- Freddy Fender, 69, American singer ("Before the Next Teardrop Falls"), lung cancer.
- Nancy Lynn, American aerobatic pilot, plane crash.
- Klaas Runia, 80, Dutch Reformed Church theologian.
- Martiens le Roux, 55, South African rugby union player (Cheetahs, national team), car accident.
- Gerry Studds, 69, American first openly gay congressman, represented Massachusetts (1973–1997), pulmonary embolism.

=== 15 ===
- Eddie Blay, 68, Ghanaian Olympic boxer (1960, 1964).
- Derek Bond, 86, British actor (Callan, Scott of the Antarctic, When Eight Bells Toll).
- William Bright, 78, American linguist and author, recorder of indigenous North American languages.
- Michael Forrester, 89, British army general.
- Joseph Manzo, 89, American football player (Boston College Eagles, Detroit Lions).
- Robert Pfarr, 86, American Olympic cyclist (1960).
- George Stevens, 74, American politician and Baptist minister.
- Michelle Urry, 66, Canadian cartoon editor for Playboy.
- Varduhi Vardanyan, 30, Armenian singer, traffic collision.
- Maurice F. Weisner, 88, American admiral.

=== 16 ===
- Niall Andrews, 69, Irish politician, Fianna Fáil TD for Dublin South (1977–1987), MEP for Leinster (1984–2004), lung cancer.
- Garry Bauman, 66, Canadian ice hockey player (Montreal Canadiens, Minnesota North Stars).
- Donna Cook, 78, American baseball player (Muskegon Lassies, Fort Wayne Daisies, Battle Creek Belles)
- Ted Cook, 84, American football player (Alabama Crimson Tide, Detroit Lions, Green Bay Packers).
- Tony Curry, 68, Bahamian baseball player (Philadelphia Phillies, Cleveland Indians).
- Ross Davidson, 57, British actor (EastEnders, Take the High Road, Monty Python's The Meaning of Life), brain tumor.
- Sid Davis, 90, American educational filmmaker, lung cancer.
- Martin Flannery, 88, British politician, Labour MP for Sheffield Hillsborough (1974–1992).
- Tommy Johnson, 71, American tuba player, complications from cancer and kidney failure.
- John Victor Murra, 90, Ukrainian-born American anthropologist and Inca scholar.
- Valentín Paniagua, 70, Peruvian president (2000–2001), complications from heart surgery.
- Lister Sinclair, 85, Canadian playwright and broadcaster, pulmonary embolism.
- Ernie Steele, 88, American football player (Philadelphia Eagles).
- Gheorghe Váczi, 84, Romanian footballer.
- Ondina Valla, 90, Italian athlete and Olympic champion (1936), natural causes.
- Anatoly Voronin, 55, Russian business chief of ITAR TASS news agency, stabbed.

=== 17 ===
- Daniel Emilfork, 82, French actor (The City of Lost Children).
- Miriam Engelberg, 48, American author, metastatic breast cancer.
- Christopher Glenn, 68, American news anchor (CBS), liver cancer.
- Megan Meier, 13, American cyberbullying victim, suicide by hanging.
- Ursula Moray Williams, 95, British children's author.
- Lieuwe Steiger, 82, Dutch goalkeeper for PSV Eindhoven (1942–1957, 1959) and The Netherlands (1953–1954).
- Marcia Tucker, 66, American curator, founder of the New Museum of Contemporary Art.

=== 18 ===
- Manfredo Alipala, 67, Filipino boxer and Olympian (1964).
- Don R. Christensen, 90, American animator and cartoonist.
- Jerry Davis, 82, American football player (Chicago Cardinals, Dallas Texans).
- Marc Hodler, 87, Swiss president of the International Ski Federation (1951–1998), International Olympic Committee whistleblower, stroke.
- Stanislovas Jančiukas, 68, Lithuanian fashion designer.
- Mario Francesco Pompedda, 77, Italian cardinal, Prefect of the Apostolic Signatura (1999–2004), brain hemorrhage.
- Anna Russell, 94, British-born Canadian comedian and classical music satirist.
- Laurie Taitt, 72, British sprint hurdler and Olympian (1964).
- Alvin M. Weinberg, 91, American Manhattan Project scientist and former director of Oak Ridge National Laboratory.

=== 19 ===
- Ralph Harris, Baron Harris of High Cross, 81, British life peer, founder of the Institute of Economic Affairs, heart attack.
- Michael Johnson, 29, American convicted murderer, suicide by exsanguination.
- Geneviève Jourdain, 61, French engineer, professor, researcher, pioneer in development of signal processing.
- Phyllis Kirk, 79, American actress (House of Wax, The Thin Man), post cerebral aneurysm.
- Chepe Rodríguez, 55, Cuban Olympic water polo player (1968).
- Srividya, 53, Indian actress, cancer.
- Arnold Viiding, 95, Estonian Olympic shot putter (1936).

=== 20 ===
- Don Burroughs, 75, American football player (Los Angeles Rams, Philadelphia Eagles), cancer.
- Irene Galitzine, 90, Russian-born Italian fashion designer.
- Maxi Herber, 86, German figure skater, and Olympic gold medalist (1936), Parkinson's disease.
- Lawrence Kolb, 95, American psychiatrist, leader in community mental health movement.
- Eric Newby, 86, British travel writer.
- Kaarlo Tuominen, 98, Finnish runner and Olympian (1936).
- Jane Wyatt, 96, American actress (Father Knows Best, Lost Horizon, Star Trek), Emmy winner (1958, 1959, 1960).

=== 21 ===
- Peter Barkworth, 77, British actor (Telford's Change, Where Eagles Dare, Patton), bronchopneumonia following a stroke.
- Paul Biegel, 81, Dutch writer of children's literature.
- Pye Chamberlayne, 68, American radio journalist, heart attack.
- Daryl Duke, 77, Canadian film and television director (The Thorn Birds, The Silent Partner, Tai-Pan), pulmonary fibrosis.
- Bryan Hipp, American guitarist (Diabolic, Cradle of Filth).
- Howard Lawson, 92, British cricketer (Hampshire).
- Bob Mann, 82, American football player (Detroit Lions, Green Bay Packers).
- Arthur Peacocke, 81, British scientist and theologian.
- Milton Selzer, 87, American actor.
- Paul Walters, 59, British BBC radio and TV producer.
- Sandy West, 47, American drummer and vocalist (The Runaways), lung cancer.
- Urien Wiliam, 76, British writer.

=== 22 ===
- Pete Barbolak, 80, American football player (Pittsburgh Steelers).
- Ricardo da Benta, 82, Portuguese Olympic rower (1948).
- Choi Kyu-hah, 87, South Korean president (1979–1980).
- Nelson de la Rosa, 38, Dominican actor.
- Masayuki Fujio, 89, Japanese former minister of education.
- Arthur Hill, 84, Canadian actor (Who's Afraid of Virginia Woolf?, Owen Marshall, Counselor at Law, The Andromeda Strain), Tony winner (1963), complications from Alzheimer's disease.
- Mancs, 12, Hungarian rescue dog with the Miskolc Spider Special Rescue Team, pneumonia.
- Richard Mayes, 83, British actor (Gandhi, Top Secret!, A Bunch of Fives).
- Michael Mayne, 77, British clergyman, Dean of Westminster Abbey (1986–1996), cancer of the jaw.

=== 23 ===
- Leonid Hambro, 86, American concert pianist.
- Jane Elizabeth Hodgson, 91, American doctor and abortion rights advocate.
- Pompiliu Iordache, 52, Romanian footballer.
- Bruno Lauzi, 69, Italian singer and composer, Parkinson's disease.
- Eugène N'Jo Léa, 75, Cameroonian footballer.
- Lebo Mathosa, 29, South African singer, car accident.
- Nafi Mersal, 46, Egyptian Olympic sprinter (1984).
- Egon Piechaczek, 74, Polish football player and coach.
- Solosolo Samuelu Sao, 80, American Samoan politician.
- Todd Skinner, 48, American free climber, climbing accident.
- Rein Strikwerda, 76, Dutch doctor and knee injury specialist.

=== 24 ===
- Jimmy Joyce, 82, American basketball player (Tri-Cities Blackhawks).
- Jeffrey Lundgren, 56, American convicted murderer, executed by lethal injection.
- Enolia McMillan, 102, American civil rights activist, first female president of the NAACP, heart failure.
- Benjamin Meed, 88, Polish-born American president and co-founder of the American Gathering of Jewish Holocaust Survivors.
- Jack Radtke, 93, American baseball player (Brooklyn Dodgers).
- W. Montgomery Watt, 97, British professor of Arabic and Islamic Studies at the University of Edinburgh.

=== 25 ===
- Paul Ableman, 79, British playwright and novelist.
- René Chesneau, 87, French Olympic wrestler (1948, 1952).
- Richard Cleaver, 89, Australian politician, MHR for Swan (1955–1969).
- Allerton Cushman, 99, American Olympic rower (1928).
- Johnny Hoekstra, 88, American basketball player.
- Johannes Lauridsen, 75, Danish Olympic long-distance runner (1960).
- Kintarō Ōki, 77, South Korean wrestler, heart attack.
- Danny Rolling, 52, American convicted murderer, executed by lethal injection.
- Frans Rombaut, 84, Belgian Olympic wrestler (1948).
- Emilio Vedova, 87, Italian painter.

=== 26 ===
- Gary Coull, 52, Canadian journalist, co-founder of CLSA, cancer.
- Rogério Duprat, 74, Brazilian composer, cancer.
- Tillman Franks, 86, American bassist, songwriter and country music manager, natural causes.
- Bill Graham, 69, American baseball player (Detroit Tigers, New York Mets).
- Ralph R. Harding, 77, American congressman from Idaho (1961–1965).
- Pontus Hultén, 82, Swedish art collector and museum director.
- John Kentish, 96, British operatic tenor.
- Nobuo Kojima, 91, Japanese author, pneumonia.
- Charles Leigh, 60, American football player (Cleveland Browns, Miami Dolphins, Green Bay Packers).
- Fred Marsh, 82, American baseball player.
- Muhammad Qasim, 32, Pakistani field hockey player and Olympian (2000).
- Don Shy, 60, American football player.
- Theodore Taylor, 85, American writer (The Cay), heart attack.
- Segundo Villadóniga, 90, Uruguayan footballer.
- Hubert Westmoreland, 91, American racing car owner.

=== 27 ===
- Luis Albino, 77, Uruguayan Olympic boxer (1952).
- John Raymond Broadbent, 92, Australian Army officer and lawyer.
- Jozsef Gregor, 66, Hungarian opera singer.
- Thomas R. Jones, 93, American jurist and civil rights activist.
- Ghulam Ishaq Khan, 91, Pakistani civil servant and bureaucrat, President of Pakistan (1988–1993), pneumonia.
- Marlin McKeever, 66, American football player (Los Angeles Rams, Washington Redskins, Minnesota Vikings), head injuries from a fall.
- Joe Niekro, 61, American baseball player (Houston Astros, Chicago Cubs, Detroit Tigers), brain aneurysm.
- Muhammad Qasim, 32, Pakistani field hockey goalkeeper, cancer.
- Albrecht von Goertz, 92, German-born American car designer.
- Brad Will, 36, American Indymedia reporter, shot whilst covering the 2006 Oaxaca protests.

=== 28 ===
- Red Auerbach, 89, American basketball coach (Boston Celtics), heart attack.
- Tina Aumont, 60, French actress, pulmonary embolism.
- György Bence, 64, Hungarian philosopher.
- Trevor Berbick, 52, Jamaican boxer and Olympian (1976), beaten.
- Max van Beurden, 75, Dutch footballer.
- Brian Brolly, 70, British co-manager of Wings (1973–1978), managing director of RUG (1978–1988), co-founder of Classic FM, heart attack.
- Henry Fok, 83, Hong Kong businessman, philanthropist and CCPPC official, lymphoma.
- Richard Gilman, 83, American drama and literary critic, lung cancer.
- Peter Gingold, 90, German anti-fascist.
- Marijohn Wilkin, 86, American country songwriter, member of the Nashville Songwriters Hall of Fame, heart failure.
- Sylvanus Williams, 84, Nigerian long jumper and Olympian (1952).

=== 29 ===
- Runer Jonsson, 90, Swedish journalist and author.
- Nigel Kneale, 84, British scriptwriter (The Quatermass Experiment), stroke.
- Muhammadu Maccido, 78, Nigerian Sultan of Sokoto, Muslim spiritual leader, plane crash.
- Badamasi Maccido, 44–45, Nigerian politician, senator (since 2003), plane crash.
- Silas Simmons, 111, American Negro league baseball player, oldest known professional baseball player.

=== 30 ===
- Clifford Geertz, 80, American cultural anthropologist, complications following heart surgery.
- Jens Christian Hauge, 91, Norwegian World War II resistance leader, first postwar defence minister, natural causes.
- Junji Kinoshita, 92, Japanese playwright, pneumonia.
- Ian Rilen, 59, Australian bass player (Rose Tattoo), bladder cancer.
- Aud Schønemann, 83, Norwegian actress.
- Mose Tolliver, 87, American folk artist, pneumonia.

=== 31 ===
- Hank Berger, 55, American nightclub owner, asthma-related problems.
- P. W. Botha, 90, South African politician, Prime Minister (1978–1984), State President (1984–1989), heart attack.
- Shane Drury, 27, American professional bull rider in the PRCA, Ewing's sarcoma.
- William Franklyn, 81, British actor, prostate cancer.
- Peter Fryer, 79, British journalist who reported on the Hungarian Revolution.
- Michael James Genovese, 87, American alleged Mafia boss of Pittsburgh.
- Cha Kyung-bok, 69, South Koren footballer, manager, and Olympian (1964).
- Rocky Nelson, 81, American baseball player.
- George B. Thomas, 92, American mathematician and author, natural causes.
- Nick Vine Hall, 62, Australian genealogist, cancer.
