= Shooting at the 1960 Summer Olympics – Men's 300 metre free rifle, three positions =

Olympic shooting event

Men's 300 metre free rifle, three positions at the Games of the XVII Olympiad
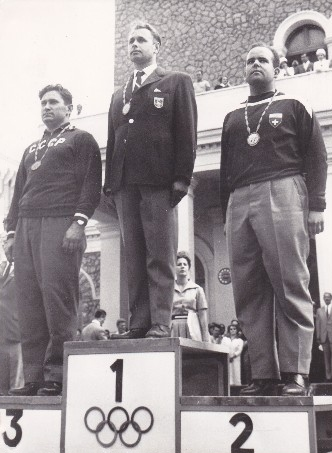
- Vasily Borisov, Hubert Hammerer and Hans Rudolf Spillmann
- Venue: Cesano Infantry School Range
- Dates: 3 September 1960 (qualifying); 5 September 1960 (final)
- Competitors: 39 from 22 nations
- Winning score: 1129

Medalists
1st place, gold medalist(s)		Hubert Hammerer; Austria
2nd place, silver medalist(s)		Hans Rudolf Spillmann; Switzerland
3rd place, bronze medalist(s)		Vasily Borisov; Soviet Union

The men's 300 m rifle three positions was a shooting sports event held as part of the Shooting at the 1960 Summer Olympics programme. It was the eighth appearance of the event at an Olympic Games. The competition was held on 3 and 5 September 1960, with 39 shooters from 22 nations competing. Nations had been limited to two shooters each since the 1952 Games. The event was won by Hubert Hammerer in Austria's debut in the event. Hans Rudolf Spillmann of Switzerland took silver. Soviet Vasily Borisov was the second man to win two medals in the event, adding a bronze to his 1956 gold.

== Background ==
This was the eighth appearance of the men's 300 metre three-positions rifle event, which was held 11 times between 1900 and 1972. Half of the top 10 shooters from 1956 returned: gold medalist Vasily Borisov of the Soviet Union, bronze medalist (and 1952 fifth-place finisher) Vilho Ylönen of Finland, fifth-place finisher Constantin Antonescu of Romania, seventh-place finisher Anders Kvissberg of Sweden, and ninth-place finisher Sándor Krebs of Hungary. Ylönen was also the reigning world champion.

Austria, Germany (as the United Team of Germany), Poland, and Sudan each made their debut in the event. Denmark, Finland, Sweden, and the United States each made their seventh appearance, tied for most of any nation.

== Competition format ==
For the only time, the competition was held over two rounds. The qualifying round was a half-sized round, with each shooter firing 60 shots (20 in each position: prone, kneeling, and standing). The 39 competitors were divided into two groups, with 20 in one group and 19 in the other. The top 19 in each group qualified for the final. Thus, only one man was eliminated.

The final round had each shooter fire 120 shots, 40 shots in each position.

Shots were fired in series of 10. The target was 1 metre in diameter, with 10 scoring rings; targets were set at a distance of 300 metres. Thus, the maximum score possible was 1200 points. Any rifle could be used.

== Records ==
Prior to the competition, the existing world and Olympic records were as follows.

World record	Anatoli Bogdanov (URS)	1145		1959
Olympic record	Vasily Borisov (URS)	1138	Melbourne, Australia	1 December 1956

No new world or Olympic records were set during the competition.

== Schedule ==
All times are Australian Eastern Standard Time (UTC+10)

Date	Time	Round
Saturday, 3 September 1960	9:00	Qualifying
Monday, 5 September 1960	9:00	Final

== Results ==
=== Qualifying ===
The qualifying round used a 60-shot format, with a total maximum score of 600. The top 19 shooters in each group advanced.

==== Group 1 ====
Bakri was the only shooter eliminated in the qualifying round, as he finished 20th in the 20-man group (and the other group had only 19 shooters, all of whom automatically advanced).

Rank	Shooter	Nation	Total	Notes
1	Hans Rudolf Spillmann	Switzerland	570	Q
2	Hubert Hammerer	Austria	567	Q
3	Daniel Puckel	United States	566	Q
4	Vasily Borisov	Soviet Union	559	Q
5	Esa Kervinen	Finland	557	Q
6	Adolfo Feliciano	Philippines	555	Q
7	Stefan Masztak	Poland	550	Q
8	Miklós Szabó	Hungary	550	Q
9	Anders Kvissberg	Sweden	549	Q
10	Jorge di Giandoménico	Argentina	548	Q
11	Constantin Antonescu	Romania	544	Q
12	František Prokop	Czechoslovakia	543	Q
13	Vladimir Grozdanović	Yugoslavia	538	Q
14	Don Tolhurst	Australia	533	Q
15	Wu Tao-yan	Formosa	527	Q
16	Egon Stephansen	Denmark	523	Q
17	Evald Gering	Canada	518	Q
18	Rubén Váldez	Peru	505	Q
19	Abdul Aziz Wains	Pakistan	487	Q
20	Basha Bakri	Sudan	421	

==== Group 2 ====
Rank	Shooter	Nation	Total	Notes
1	Vilho Ylönen	Finland	1126	Q
2	Vladimír Stibořík	Czechoslovakia	1123	Q
3	Moisei Itkis	Soviet Union	1124	Q
4	John Foster	United States	1121	Q
5	August Hollenstein	Switzerland	1112	Q
6	Wilhelm Sachsenmaier	Austria	1098	Q
7	Sándor Krebs	Hungary	1118	Q
8	Kurt Johansson	Sweden	1095	Q
9	Hans-Joachim Mars	United Team of Germany	1105	Q
10	Pedro Armella	Argentina	1078	Q
11	Uffe Schultz Larsen	Denmark	1088	Q
12	Edson Warner	Canada	1078	Q
13	Marin Ferecatu	Romania	1050	Q
14	Henryk Górski	Poland	1098	Q
15	Josip Ćuk	Yugoslavia	1085	Q
16	Luis Albornoz	Peru	1037	Q
17	John Holt	Australia	1030	Q
18	Michiel Victor	South Africa	1012	Q
19	Omar Anas	Sudan	812	Q

=== Final ===
Rank	Shooter	Nation	Total
1st place, gold medalist(s)	Hubert Hammerer	Austria	1129
2nd place, silver medalist(s)	Hans Rudolf Spillmann	Switzerland	1127
3rd place, bronze medalist(s)	Vasily Borisov	Soviet Union	1127
4	Vilho Ylönen	Finland	1126
5	Moisei Itkis	Soviet Union	1124
6	Vladimír Stibořík	Czechoslovakia	1123
7	John Foster	United States	1121
8	Sándor Krebs	Hungary	1118
9	Esa Kervinen	Finland	1117
10	Daniel Puckel	United States	1114
11	August Hollenstein	Switzerland	1112
12	Hans-Joachim Mars	United Team of Germany	1105
13	Stefan Masztak	Poland	1105
14	Anders Kvissberg	Sweden	1104
15	František Prokop	Czechoslovakia	1101
16	Wilhelm Sachsenmaier	Austria	1098
17	Henryk Górski	Poland	1098
18	Miklós Szabó	Hungary	1096
19	Kurt Johansson	Sweden	1095
20	Constantin Antonescu	Romania	1092
21	Uffe Schultz Larsen	Denmark	1088
22	Jorge di Giandoménico	Argentina	1088
23	Josip Ćuk	Yugoslavia	1085
24	Edson Warner	Canada	1078
25	Pedro Armella	Argentina	1078
26	Wu Tao-yan	Formosa	1074
27	Vladimir Grozdanović	Yugoslavia	1073
28	Adolfo Feliciano	Philippines	1072
29	Egon Stephansen	Denmark	1071
30	Marin Ferecatu	Romania	1050
31	Don Tolhurst	Australia	1049
32	Evald Gering	Canada	1037
33	Luis Albornoz	Peru	1037
34	John Holt	Australia	1030
35	Rubén Váldez	Peru	1028
36	Michiel Victor	South Africa	1012
37	Omar Anas	Sudan	812
—	Abdul Aziz Wains	Pakistan	DNS
