= Prokopovich =

Prokopovich is a Slavic patronymic surname derived from the first name Prokop, a variant of the Latin name Procopius. It corresponds to Polish Prokopowicz, Ukrainian Prokopovych, and Belarusian Prakapovich.

"Prokopovich" may also be a patronymic part of a full East Slavic name, however with a different pronunciation: the surname has the penultimate accent, while the patronymic retains the accent of the first name Prokop, i.e., on the second syllable.

The surname Prokopovich may refer to the following notable people:

- Theophan Prokopovich (1681–1736), Russian archbishop
- Sergei Prokopovich (1871–1955), Russian economist, sociologist, and politician

== See also ==
- 6681 Prokopovich, asteroid
