= Prokopovych =

Prokopovych is a Ukrainian-language patronymic surname derived from the Slavic first name Prokop, from Latin name Procopius. It corresponds to Polish Prokopowicz, Belarusian Prakapovich and Russian Prokopovich.

"Prokopovych" may also be a patronymic part of a full East Slavic name, however with a different pronunciation: the surname has the penultimate accent, while the patronymic retains the accent of the first name Prokop, i.e., on the second syllable.

The surname Prokopovych may refer to:

- Petro Prokopovych (1775–1850), Ukrainian founder of commercial beekeeping
- Vyacheslav Prokopovych (1881-1942), Ukrainian politician
