= Prokopchuk =

Prokopchuk is an East Slavic patronymic surname derived from the given name Prokop. Polish version: Prokopczuk, Belarusian: Prakapchuk. Notable people with the surname include:

- Yulia Prokopchuk (born 1986), Ukrainian diver
- Ihor Prokopchuk (born 1968), Ukrainian diplomat
- Evgeniy Prokopchuk (born 1994), Russian judoka
- Alexander Prokopchuk (born 1961), Russian police officer

== See also ==
- Prokopchik
