= Procope =

Procope may refer to:

- Apheresis, a removal of blood plasma from the body
- Apheresis (linguistics), in linguistics, a sound change in which a word-initial is lost
- Café Procope, the oldest cafe in Paris
- Herman Oskar Procopé (1841–1905), Finnish lieutenant general who served in the Imperial Russian Army
- Procopio Cutò, otherwise known as François Procope (1651–1727), a Sicilian chef who founded the Café Procope
- Ulla Procopé (1921–1968), a Finnish designer of ceramics

== See also ==
- Prokop
