= Hans Rudolf Spillmann =

Swiss sports shooter (1932–2024)

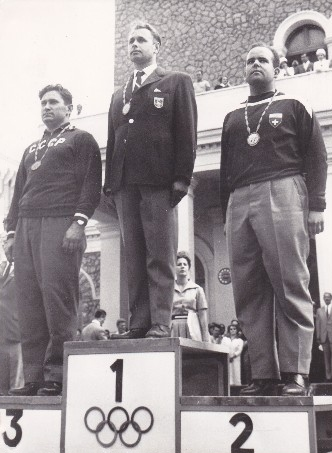
- Vasily Borisov, Hubert Hammerer and Hans Rudolf Spillmann at the 1960 Olympics

Personal information
- Born: 7 January 1932 Zürich, Switzerland
- Died: 11 June 2024 (aged 92) Zürich, Switzerland
- Height: 1.69 m (5 ft 7 in)
- Weight: 84 kg (185 lb)

Sport
- Sport: Shooting
Medal record
Representing Switzerland
Olympic Games
Silver medal – second place	1960 Rome	300 m free rifle, three positions
World Championships
Silver medal – second place	1962 Cairo	300 m free rifle, three positions

Hans Rudolf "Hansruedi" Spillmann-Simmler (7 January 1932 – 11 June 2024) was a Swiss sports shooter. He won silver medals in the rifle 300m three positions event at the 1960 Olympics and 1962 World Championships. Spillmann died in Zürich on 11 June 2024, at the age of 92.
