= Michiel Victor =

South African sports shooter

Personal information
- Born: 28 May 1910 Winburg, Orange River Colony
- Died: 21 August 1998 (aged 88) Pretoria, South Africa

Sport
- Sport: Sports shooting

Michiel Victor (28 May 1910 – 21 August 1998) was a South African sports shooter. He competed in the 300 metre rifle, three positions and 50 metre rifle, three positions events at the 1960 Summer Olympics.
