= Aziz Ahmed Chaudhry =

Pakistani sports shooter (born 1932)

Personal information
- Born: 1 January 1932 Gurdaspur, British India

Sport
- Sport: Sports shooting

Aziz Ahmed Chaudhry (born 1 January 1932), also known as Abdul Aziz Wains, is a Pakistani former sports shooter. He competed in the 300 metre rifle, three positions event at the 1960 Summer Olympics, advancing from the qualifying round to the final. He later competed in two events at the 1964 Summer Olympics.
