= Tanja Frank =

Austrian competitive sailor (born 1993)

- Frank in 2026

Personal information
- Full name: Tanja Chiara Frank
- Nationality: Austrian
- Born: 24 January 1993 (age 33) Vienna, Austria
- Height: 1.67 m (5 ft 6 in)
- Weight: 57 kg (126 lb)

Sailing career
- Sport: Sailing
Medal record
Sailing
Representing Austria
Olympic Games
Bronze medal – third place	2016 Rio de Janeiro	Nacra 17
World Championships
Silver medal – second place	2018 Aarhus	49er FX

Tanja Chiara Frank (born 24 January 1993) is an Austrian competitive sailor.

She competed at the 2016 Summer Olympics in Rio de Janeiro, in the mixed Nacra 17 where she won a bronze medal. Frank was a flag bearer for Austria during the closing ceremonies along with sailing partner Thomas Zajac. In 2021, she competed in the 2020 Olympics, finishing 17th.

Olympic Games
Preceded by Liu Jia	Flagbearer for Austria (with Thomas Zajac); Tokyo 2020	Succeeded by Incumbent
