= Egon Stephansen =

Danish sports shooter (born 1934)

Personal information
- Born: 22 October 1934 (age 91) Vejle, Denmark

Sport
- Sport: Sports shooting

Egon Stephansen (born 22 October 1934) is a Danish former sports shooter. He competed in the 300 metre rifle, three positions and 50 metre rifle, prone events at the 1960 Summer Olympics.
