= Miklós Szabó (sport shooter) =

Hungarian sports shooter (1938–2019)

Personal information
- Born: 2 September 1938 Szolnok, Hungary
- Died: 10 October 2019 (aged 81)

Sport
- Sport: Sports shooting

Miklós Szabó (2 September 1938 – 10 October 2019) was a Hungarian sports shooter. He competed in the 300 metre rifle, three positions event at the 1960 Summer Olympics.
