= List of flag bearers for Austria at the Olympics =

Austria at the Olympics
- IOC code: AUT
- NOC: Austrian Olympic Committee
- Website: www.oeoc.at (in German)
- Medals: Gold 93 Silver 123 Bronze 135 Total 351

Summer appearances
- 1896; 1900; 1904; 1908; 1912; 1920; 1924; 1928; 1932; 1936; 1948; 1952; 1956; 1960; 1964; 1968; 1972; 1976; 1980; 1984; 1988; 1992; 1996; 2000; 2004; 2008; 2012; 2016; 2020; 2024

Winter appearances
- 1924; 1928; 1932; 1936; 1948; 1952; 1956; 1960; 1964; 1968; 1972; 1976; 1980; 1984; 1988; 1992; 1994; 1998; 2002; 2006; 2010; 2014; 2018; 2022; 2026

Other related appearances
- 1906 Intercalated Games

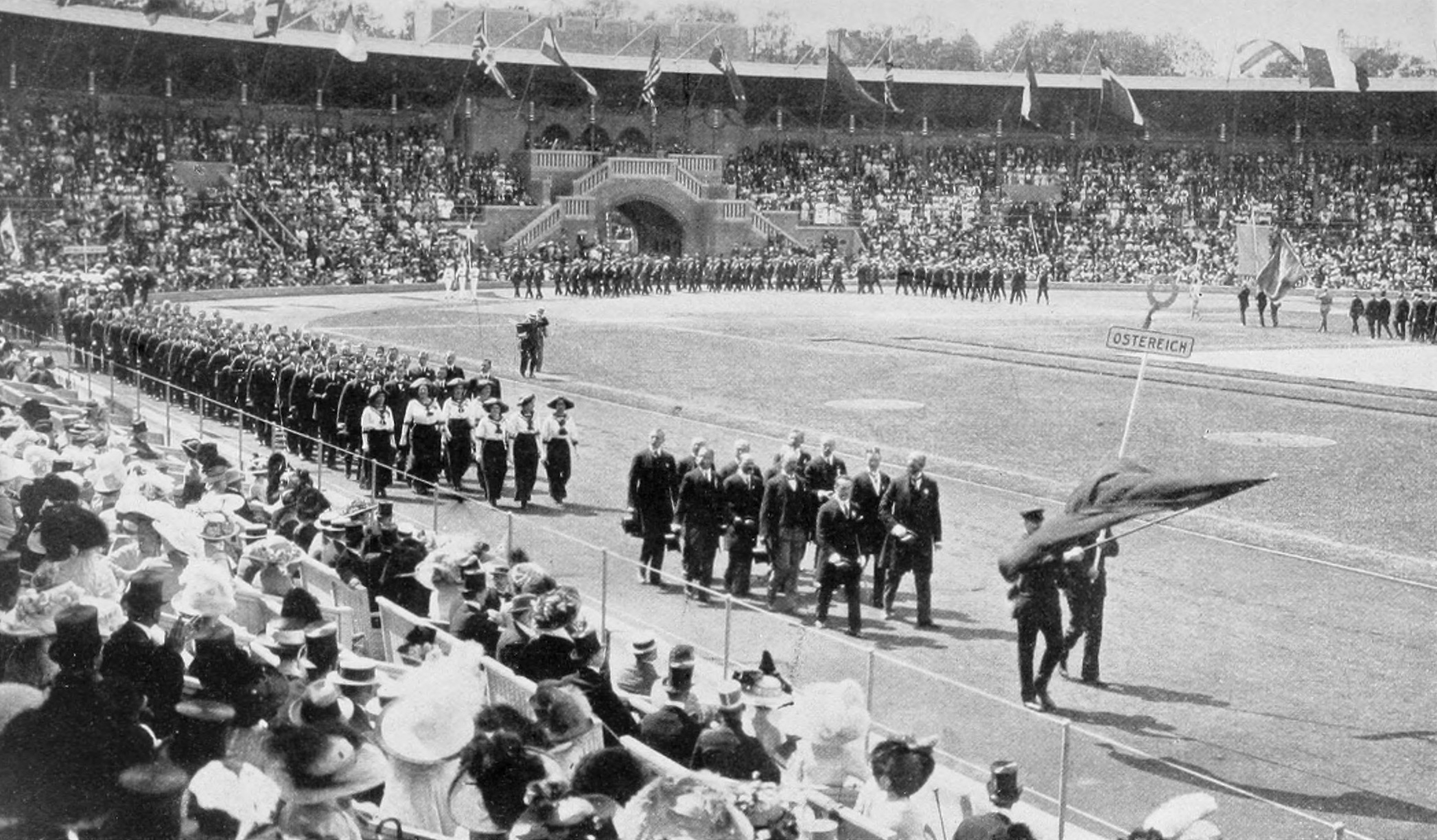
Austria at the 1912 Summer Olympics

This is a list of flag bearers who have represented Austria at the Olympics.

Flag bearers carry the national flag of their country at the opening ceremony of the Olympic Games.

| # | Event year | Season | Flag bearer | Sport |
|---|---|---|---|---|
| 1 | 1928 | Summer | Ludwig Wessely | Athletics |
| 2 | 1932 | Winter | Harald Paumgarten | Cross-country skiing |
| 3 | 1936 | Winter | Karl Schäfer | Figure skating |
| 4 | 1936 | Summer | Fritz Wurmböck | Handball |
| 5 | 1952 | Winter | Sepp Bradl | Ski jumping |
| 6 | 1952 | Summer | Willi Welt | Gymnastics |
| 7 | 1956 | Winter | Toni Sailer | Alpine skiing |
| 8 | 1956 | Summer | Franz Wimmer | Cycling |
| 9 | 1960 | Winter | Norbert Felsinger | Figure skating |
| 10 | 1960 | Summer | Herbert Wiedermann | Canoe racing |
| 11 | 1964 | Winter | Regine Heitzer | Figure skating |
| 12 | 1964 | Summer | Hubert Hammerer | Shooting |
| 13 | 1968 | Winter | Emmerich Danzer | Figure skating |
| 14 | 1968 | Summer | Roland Losert | Fencing |
| 15 | 1972 | Winter | Manfred Schmid | Luge |
| 16 | 1972 | Summer | Hubert Raudaschl | Sailing |
| 17 | 1976 | Winter | Franz Klammer | Alpine skiing |
| 18 | 1976 | Summer | Günther Pfaff | Canoe racing |
| 19 | 1980 | Winter | Annemarie Moser-Pröll | Alpine skiing |
| 20 | 1980 | Summer | Karl Ferstl | Sailing |
| 21 | 1984 | Winter | Franz Klammer | Alpine skiing |
| 22 | 1984 | Summer | Hubert Raudaschl | Sailing |
| 23 | 1988 | Winter | Leonhard Stock | Alpine skiing |
| 24 | 1988 | Summer | Hubert Raudaschl | Sailing |
| 25 | 1992 | Winter | Anita Wachter | Alpine skiing |
| 26 | 1992 | Summer | Sissy Max-Theurer | Equestrianism |
| 27 | 1994 | Winter | Anita Wachter | Alpine skiing |
| 28 | 1996 | Summer | Hubert Raudaschl | Sailing |
| 29 | 1998 | Winter | Emese Nemeth-Hunyady | Speed skating |
| 30 | 2000 | Summer | Wolfram Waibel Jr. | Shooting |
| 31 | 2002 | Winter | Angelika Neuner | Luge |
| 32 | 2004 | Summer | Roman Hagara | Sailing |
| 33 | 2006 | Winter | Renate Götschl | Alpine skiing |
| 34 | 2008 | Summer | Hans-Peter Steinacher | Sailing |
| 35 | 2010 | Winter | Andreas Linger | Luge |
| 35 | 2010 | Winter | Wolfgang Linger | Luge |
| 36 | 2012 | Summer | Markus Rogan | Swimming |
| 37 | 2014 | Winter | Mario Stecher | Nordic combined |
| 38 | 2016 | Summer | Liu Jia | Table tennis |
| 39 | 2018 | Winter | Anna Veith | Alpine skiing |
| 40 | 2020 | Summer | Tanja Frank | Sailing |
| 40 | 2020 | Summer | Thomas Zajac | Sailing |
| 41 | 2022 | Winter | Julia Dujmovits | Snowboarding |
| 41 | 2022 | Winter | Benjamin Maier | Bobsleigh |
| 42 | 2024 | Summer | Felix Oschmautz | Canoeing |
| 42 | 2024 | Summer | Michaela Polleres | Judo |

== See also ==
- Austria at the Olympics
