= Thomas Zajac =

Austrian sailor

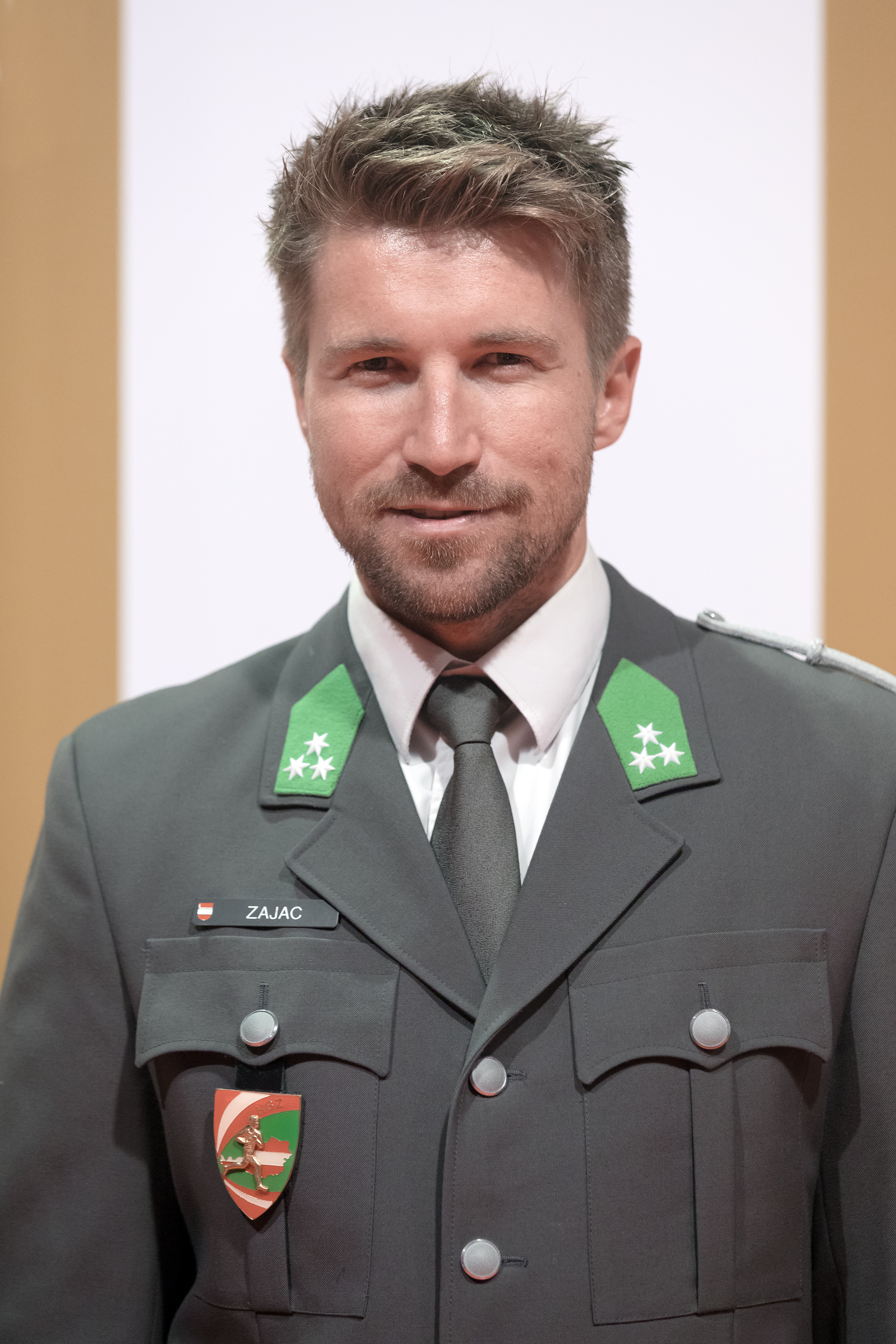
- Zajac in 2017

Personal information
- Nationality: Austrian
- Born: 22 September 1985 (age 40) Vienna
- Height: 1.80 m (5 ft 11 in)
- Weight: 77 kg (170 lb)

Sport
- Sport: Sailing
Medal record
Olympic Games
Bronze medal – third place	2016 Rio de Janeiro	Nacra 17
World Championships
Silver medal – second place	2009 Bogliaco	Tornado

Thomas Zajac (born 22 September 1985) is an Austrian competitive sailor.

He competed at the 2016 Summer Olympics in Rio de Janeiro, in the mixed Nacra 17 where he won a bronze medal. Zajac was the flag bearer for Austria during the closing ceremonies along with Tanja Frank.

In 2021, in the 2020 Olympics, he competed partnered with Barbara Matz in the Nacra 17 event.

Olympic Games
Preceded by Liu Jia	Flagbearer for Austria (with Tanja Frank); Tokyo 2020	Succeeded by Incumbent
