= Procopio (disambiguation) =

Procopio was a Mexican bandit.

Procopio may also refer to:

- Procopio (comics), an Italian comic strip
- the title character of Don Procopio, a two-act opera buffa by Georges Bizet
- Procopio Bonifacio (1873–1897), Philippine independence activist and politician
- Procópio Cardoso (born 1939), Brazilian former football player and coach
- Procopio Cutò (1651–1727), Italian chef
- Procopio Franco (born 1970), Mexican former long-distance runner
- Bruno Procopio (born 1976), Brazilian harpsichord player
- Rubén Procopio (born 1961), American animation and comic book artist
- Zezé Procópio (1913–1980), Brazilian football player

== See also ==
- Procopius (disambiguation)
