= Evald Gering =

Canadian sports shooter (1918–2007)

Evald Voldemar Gering
Personal information
- Born: 24 May 1918 Paldiski, Estonia
- Died: 6 September 2007 (aged 89) Grimsby, Ontario, Canada

Sport
- Sport: Sports shooting

Evald Voldemar Gering (24 May 1918 – 6 September 2007) was an Estonian-born Canadian sports shooter. He competed in the 300 metre rifle, three positions and 50 metre rifle, three positions events at the 1960 Summer Olympics.
