= Hans-Joachim Mars =

German sports shooter

Personal information
- Born: 19 February 1926 Niemierzyno, Poland

Sport
- Sport: Sports shooting
- Event: 300 meter rifle three positions

Hans-Joachim Mars (born 19 February 1926) is a German former sports shooter. He competed in the 300 metre rifle, three positions event at the 1960 Summer Olympics.
