= Luis Albornoz =

Peruvian sports shooter

Personal information
- Full name: Luis Alberto Albornoz Carreras
- Born: 18 November 1908 Callao, Peru
- Height: 162 cm (5 ft 4 in)
- Weight: 70 kg (154 lb)

Sport
- Country: Peru
- Sport: Sports shooting

Luis Alberto Albornoz Carreras (Note: In this Spanish name, the first or paternal surname is Albornoz and the second or maternal family name is Carreras.) (born 18 November 1908, date of death unknown) was a Peruvian sports shooter. He competed in the 300 metre rifle, three positions event at the 1960 Summer Olympics, finishing 33rd.

Albornoz also competed in team rifle events at the Pan American Games. He won two silvers and one bronze medal at the inaugural 1951 games in Buenos Aires, and one bronze at the 1959 games in Chicago, representing his native Peru.
