= Saint Procopius =

Saint Procopius may refer to:

== People ==
- Procopius of Scythopolis (died 303), Christian martyr and saint
- Procopius of Sázava (died 1053), Bohemian canon and hermit
- Procopius of Ustyug (1243?—1303), fool for Christ (yurodivy), miracle worker and Russian Orthodox Church saint

== Churches ==
- St. Procopius Basilica in Třebíč, Czech Republic
- St. Procopius Church (Tirana), Albania
- St. Procopius Church, Žďár nad Sázavou, Czech Republic

== Other uses ==
- St. Procopius College, original name of Benedictine University, Lisle, Illinois, United States
  - St. Procopius Abbey, Chicago, Illinois, whose monks founded the college
- Agios Prokopios, a seaside village on the island of Naxos, Greece
