= Basha Bakri =

Sudanese sport shooter (born 1927)

Personal information
- Born: 1927 Daiong, Sudan

Sport
- Sport: Sports shooting

Basha Bakri (born 1927) is a Sudanese former sports shooter. He competed in the 300 metre rifle, three positions event at the 1960 Summer Olympics.
