= Don Tolhurst =

Australian sports shooter

Personal information
- Born: 24 June 1929 Sydney, Australia
- Died: 21 February 2005 (aged 75) Helensburgh, New South Wales, Australia

Sport
- Sport: Sports shooting

Don Tolhurst (24 June 1929 – 21 February 2005) was an Australian sports shooter. He competed at four Olympic Games.
