= Prokop (disambiguation) =

Prokop is a given name and surname.

Prokop may also refer to:

- Prokop, Belgrade, urban neighborhood of Belgrade, Serbia
- Prokop railway station in Belgrade, Serbia
- Prokop Valley, recreational area in southwestern Prague, Czech Republic
- Veliki Prokop, village in Croatia
