= Vladimir Grozdanović =

Yugoslav sports shooter

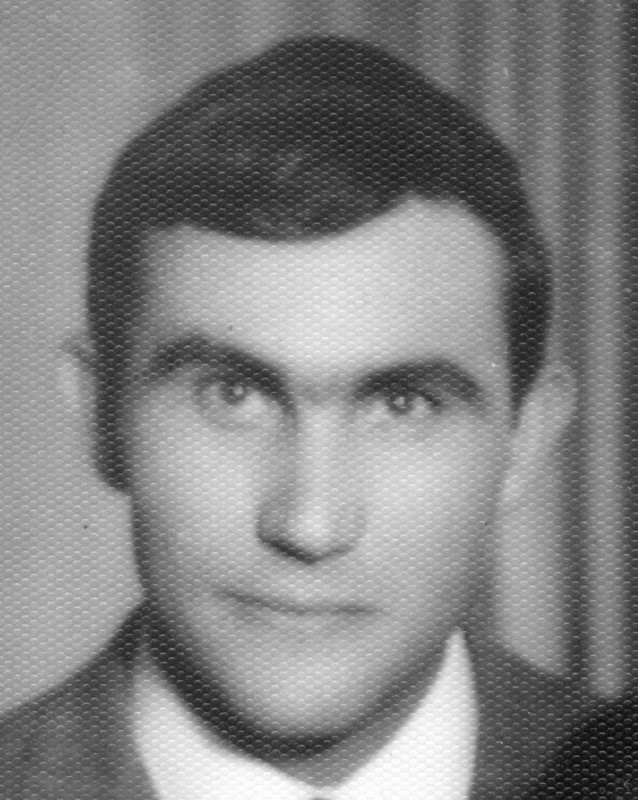
- Vladimir Grozdanović (born 1937), former Yugoslav sports shooter

Personal information
- Born: 17 October 1937 (age 89) Niš, Kingdom of Yugoslavia

Sport
- Sport: Sports shooting

Vladimir Grozdanović (born 17 October 1937) is a Yugoslav former sports shooter. He competed at the 1960 Summer Olympics and the 1968 Summer Olympics.
