= Stefan Masztak =

Polish sports shooter

Personal information
- Born: 7 April 1927 Vilna, Poland
- Died: 4 October 2006 (aged 79)

Sport
- Sport: Sports shooting

Stefan Masztak (7 April 1927 – 4 October 2006) was a Polish sports shooter. He competed in the 300 metre rifle, three positions event at the 1960 Summer Olympics.
