= Valerie Campbell-Harding =

Canadian-British textile art designer and author

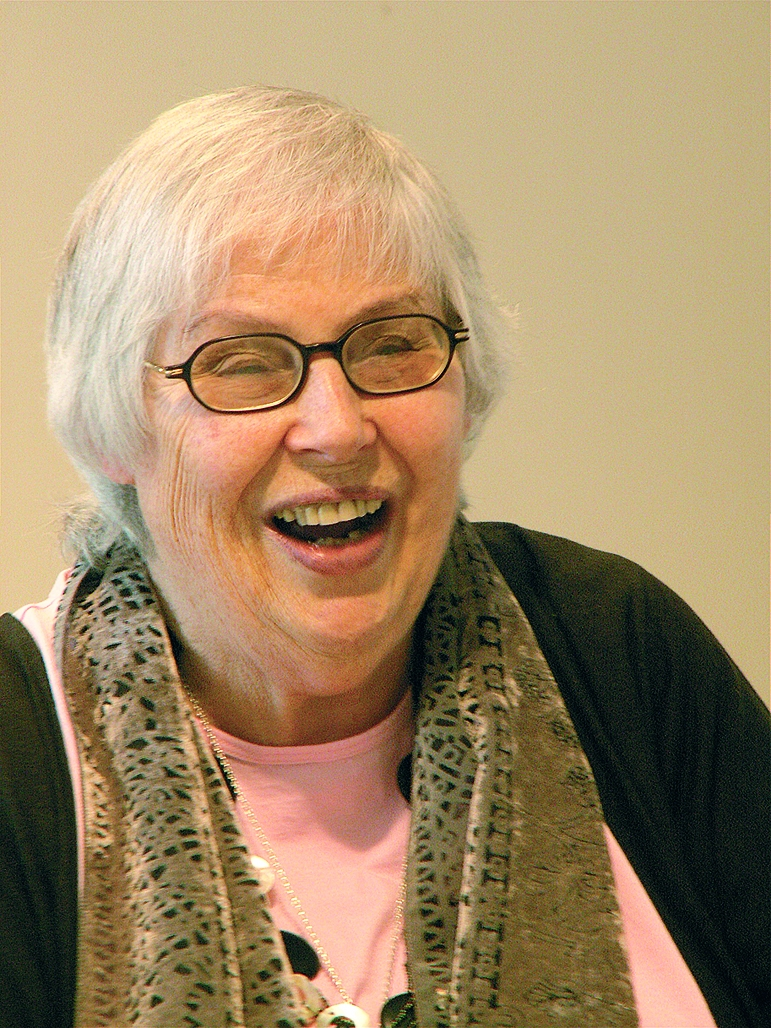
- Valerie Campbell-Harding
- Born: Valerie Anne Campbell; May 3, 1932; Toronto, Ontario, Canada
- Died: October 5, 2006 (aged 74); Southampton, Hampshire, England, UK

Valerie Anne Campbell-Harding (May 3, 1932 – October 5, 2006) was an experimental textile art designer, pioneer of computer textile design, and author of 24 books on textiles techniques.

== Biography ==
She was born in Canada on May 3, 1932, and died in England on October 5, 2006. After moving to the UK she studied at Goldsmiths and began to professionally practice textiles in the 1970s. She founded the Computer Textile Design Group in 1996, a group whose focus was the application of computer technologies to textiles. Campbell-Harding was also editor and frequent contributor to the Computer Textile Design Group magazine Design IT. Valerie Campbell-Harding taught City & Guilds Embroidery, Decorated Textiles and Machine Embroidery and weekend courses and workshops on embroidery, beading, digital photography and computer design for textiles all over the world (in particular Britain, America and Australia) between 1980 and her death. She was the editor of The World of Embroidery, the author or co-author of more than twenty books on embroidery, design and beading (often with Maggie Grey, Pamela Watts or Jane Lemon) and appeared on British television speaking about her work between the 1970s and 2000s.

She specialised in experimental, abstract embroidery, being one of the first to pioneer computer textiles. She experimented with three-dimensional embroidery and beading, focusing in particular on developing experimental technique more than production of large-scale works, and so much of her surviving work is in the form of samples preserved for demonstration.

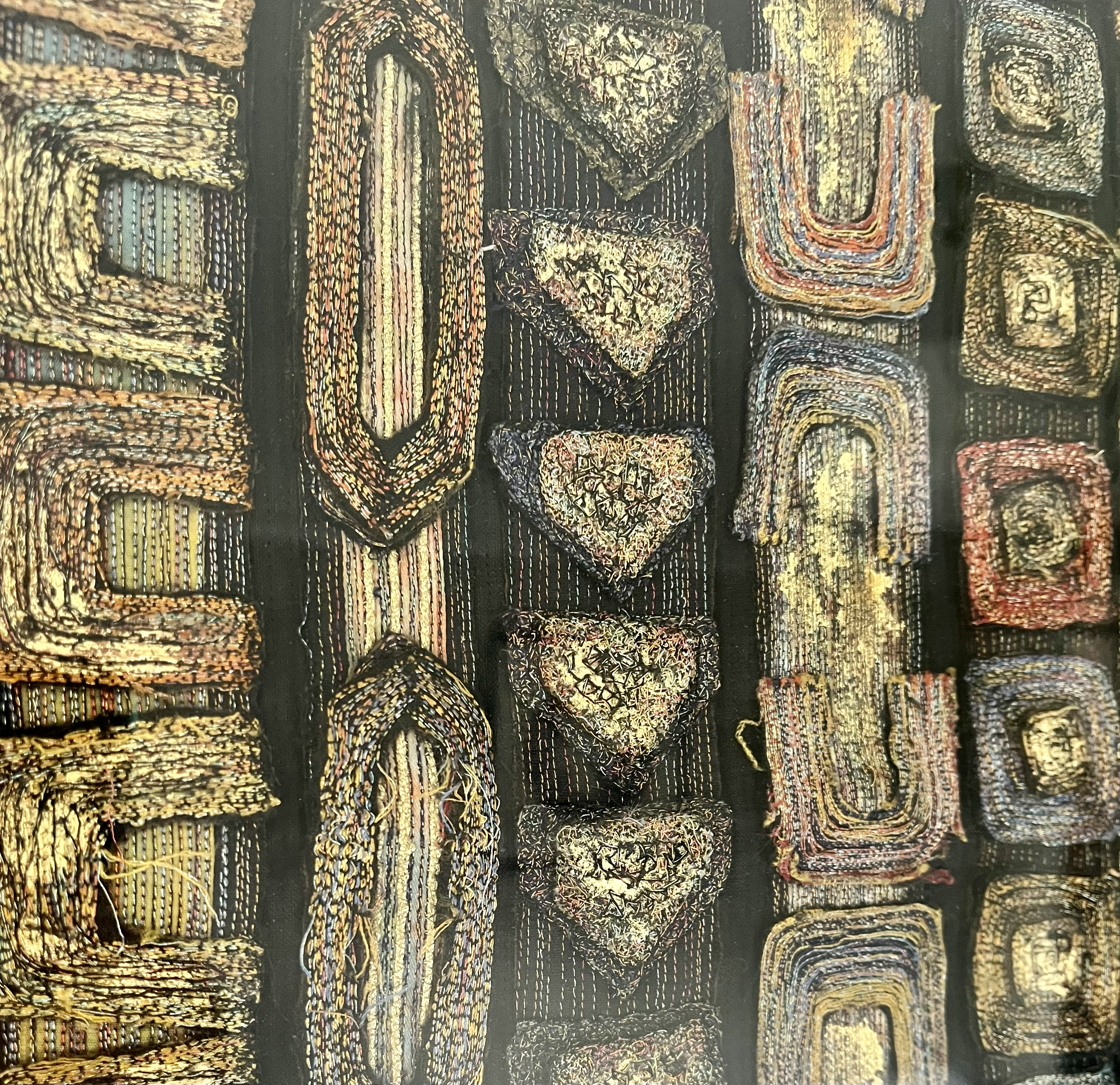
Close-up of embroidery by Valerie Campbell-Harding

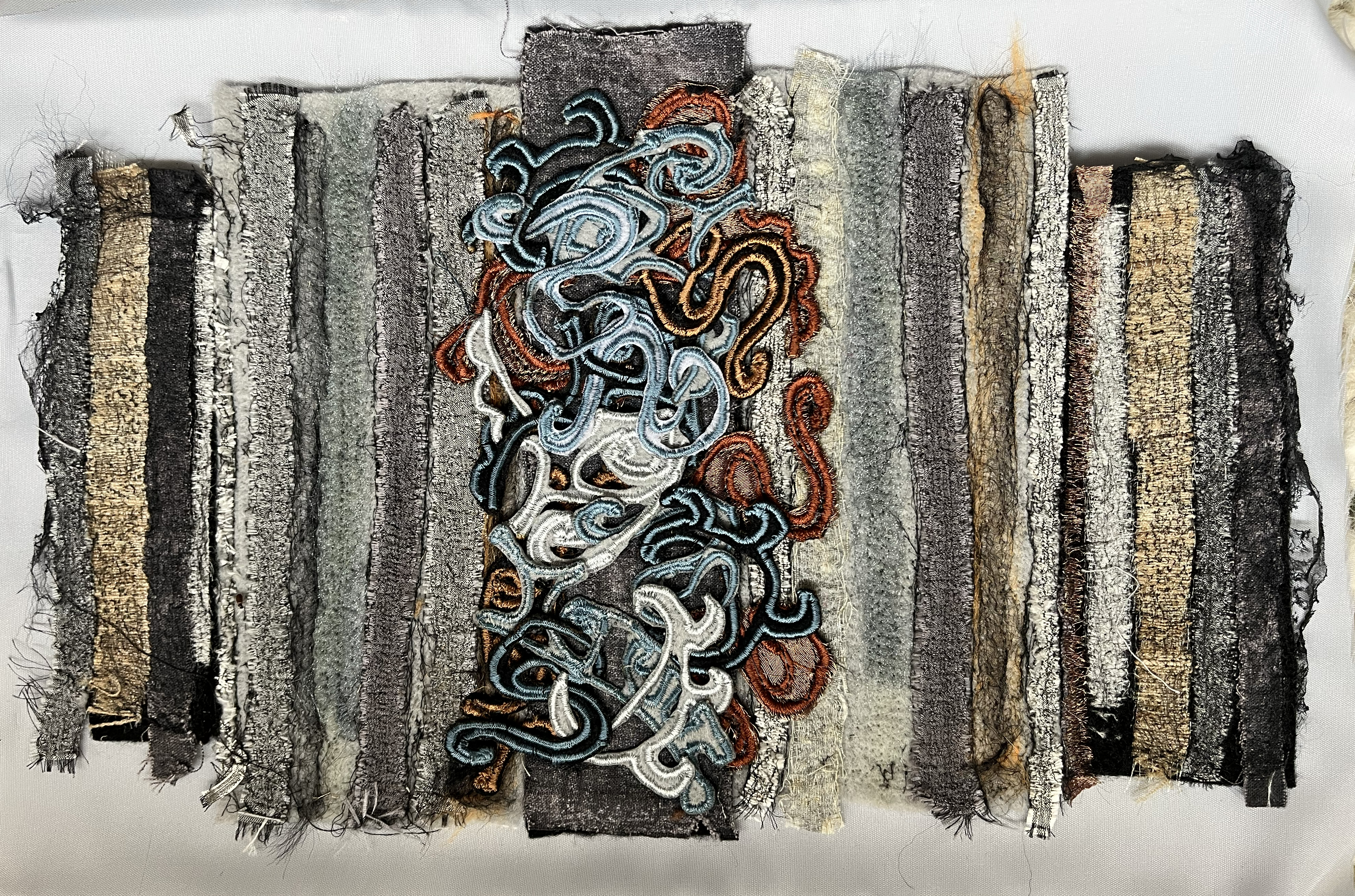
Valerie Campbell-harding untitled embroidery

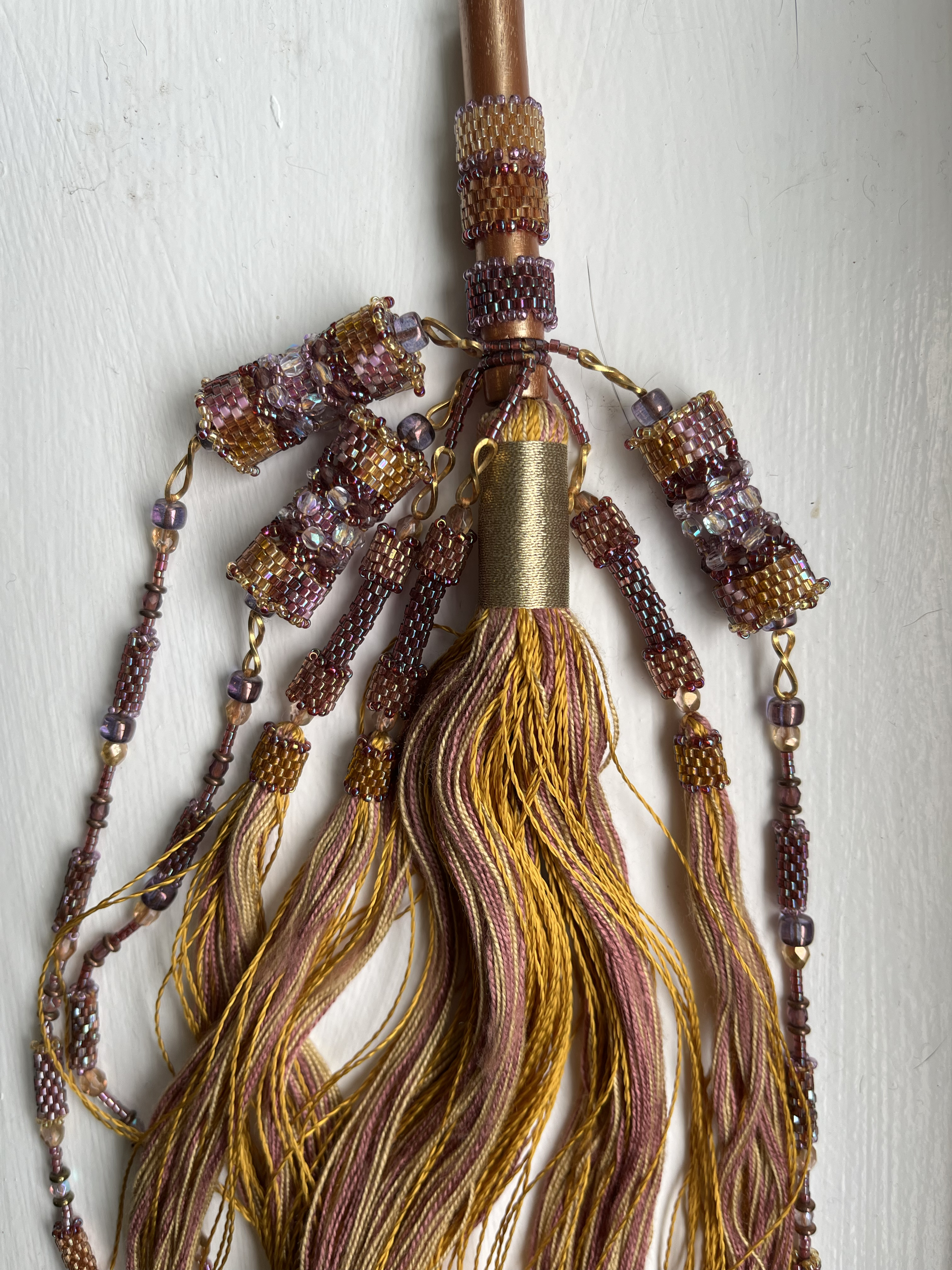
Beaded tassel by Valerie Campbell-Harding

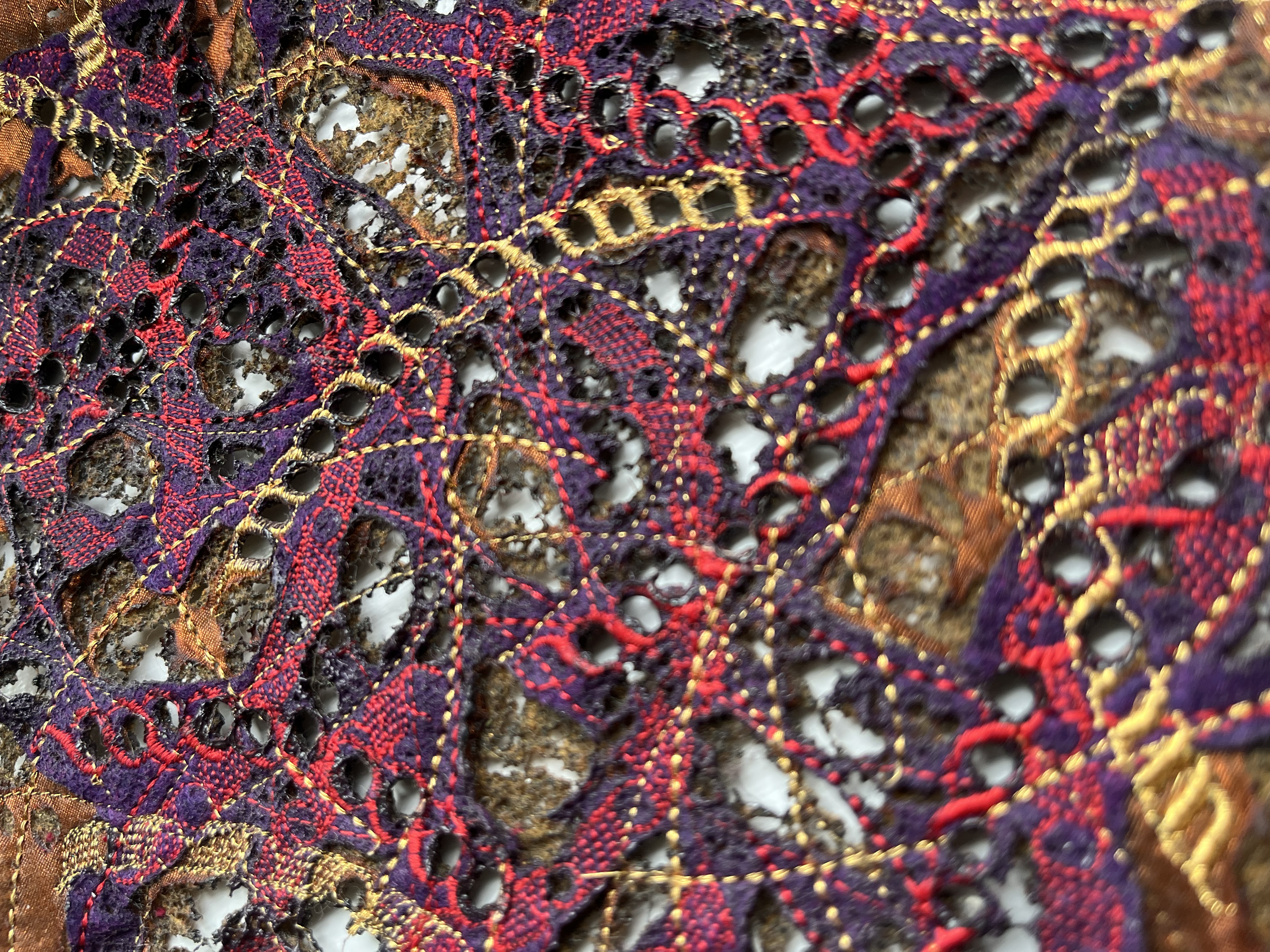
Close-up of embroidery sample by Valerie Campbell-Harding

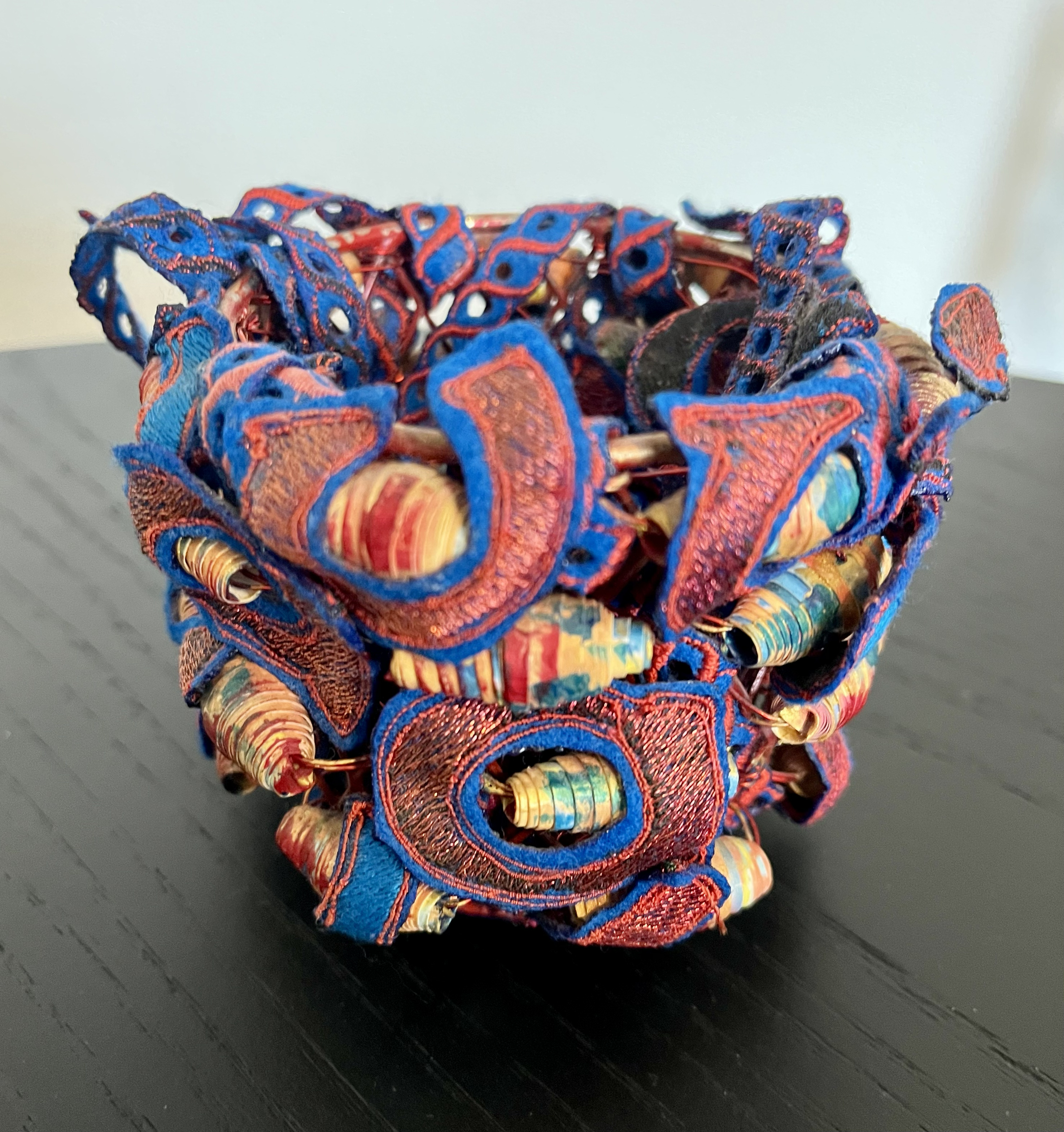
Beaded vessel by Valerie Campbell-Harding

=== Publications ===
- Textures in Embroidery, Batsford.
- Patchwork 1 and 2 (co-author), Search Press.
- Faces And Figures in Embroidery, Batsford.
- Strip Patchwork, Batsford.
- Goldwork, Search Press.
- Every Kind of Patchwork (co-author), Pan.
- Flowers and Plants in Embroidery, Batsford.
- Gold & Silver Embroidery (3 sections), Search Press.
- Weaving with Ribbon, David & Charles.
- Machine Embroidery: Stitch Techniques (co-author), Batsford.
- Fabric Painting for Embroidery, Batsford.
- Embroidery Studio (2 chapters), David & Charles.
- Bead Embroidery (co-author), Batsford.
- Machine Embroidery: Stitched Patterns, Batsford
- The Machine Embroidery Workbook (co-author), Embroiderers’ Guild.
- Beaded Tassels, Braids & Fringes, Sterling.
- Layers of Stitch
- Machine Embroidery: Layers of Stitch (co-author), Batsford.
- Celtic Inspiration for Machine Embroidery (co-author), Batsford.
- Stitching the Edge, Batsford (2004).
- Starting to Stitch Creatively, Batsford (editor).

=== Exhibitions ===
- Commonwealth Institute, London.
- Foyle's Art Gallery London.
- Embroiderers' Guild Hampton Court.
- South Hill Park Arts Centre, Bracknell, Berkshire.
- Ideal Home Exhibition.
- Newbury Festival.
- Salisbury Cathedral.
- Hereford Cathedral.
- Art in Action, Waterperry House, Salisbury, Windsor and Loughborough Art Colleges.
- Commissioned work in private collections, and at Radley College, Abingdon.

=== Work as editor ===
Campbell-Harding influenced the world of contemporary embroidery in part through her editorial work, holding editor posts at:

- The World of Embroidery 1988–1996.
- Beadworkers Guild Journal 1999–2000.
- Computer Textile Design Group Magazine Design-IT 1992–2006.
