= Marin Ferecatu =

Romanian sports shooter

Marin Ferecatu (born 3 May 1940) is a Romanian former sports shooter. He competed at the 1960 Summer Olympics and the 1968 Summer Olympics.
