= John Turvey =

John Wilfred Turvey, CM OBC (October 26, 1944 – October 11, 2006) was a long-time advocate for the disadvantaged in Vancouver, British Columbia. After becoming a heroin addict at 13 years old and dropping out of Barr Beacon School in year 10, John Turvey went on to found and serve as the Executive Director of the Downtown Eastside Youth Activities Society for 20 years. He died of mitochondrial myopathy in Comox, British Columbia at the age of 61.

== Biography ==
=== Advocacy roles ===
After rehabilitating himself from a heroin addiction Turvey worked as a social worker in Vancouver for the provincial Ministry of Human Resources. In the early-1980s he founded the private, not-for-profit Downtown Eastside Youth Activities Society. Through the group he helped run drug and alcohol counselling, youth detox beds, a youth outreach program and a youth drop-in centre. Turvey initiated a needle exchange program in 1988 in Vancouver's Downtown Eastside that was later replaced by a government-run safe injection site. He was an active advocate on behalf of exploited sex trade workers as a participant in the Coalition Against Trafficking in Women. Turvey worked as the Executive Director of the Downtown Eastside Youth Activities Society for 20 years before being diagnosed with mitochondrial myopathy and retiring. He was also a founding member of the B.C. AIDS Network and Vancouver Native Health Society.

=== Recognition ===
Turvey was recognized by the Atlanta-based Centres for Disease Control in 1993 for running the most cost-effective needle exchange program in North America. Upon his investiture as a member of the Order of Canada he was recognized as a formidable advocate for the disadvantaged, particularly youth, and was credited for bringing about changes in the Criminal Code and increased public awareness of issues concerning sexually exploited children. Two years earlier, he was recognized by admission to the Order of British Columbia for his role as an advocate for the under privileged.
