= Max van Beurden =

Dutch footballer

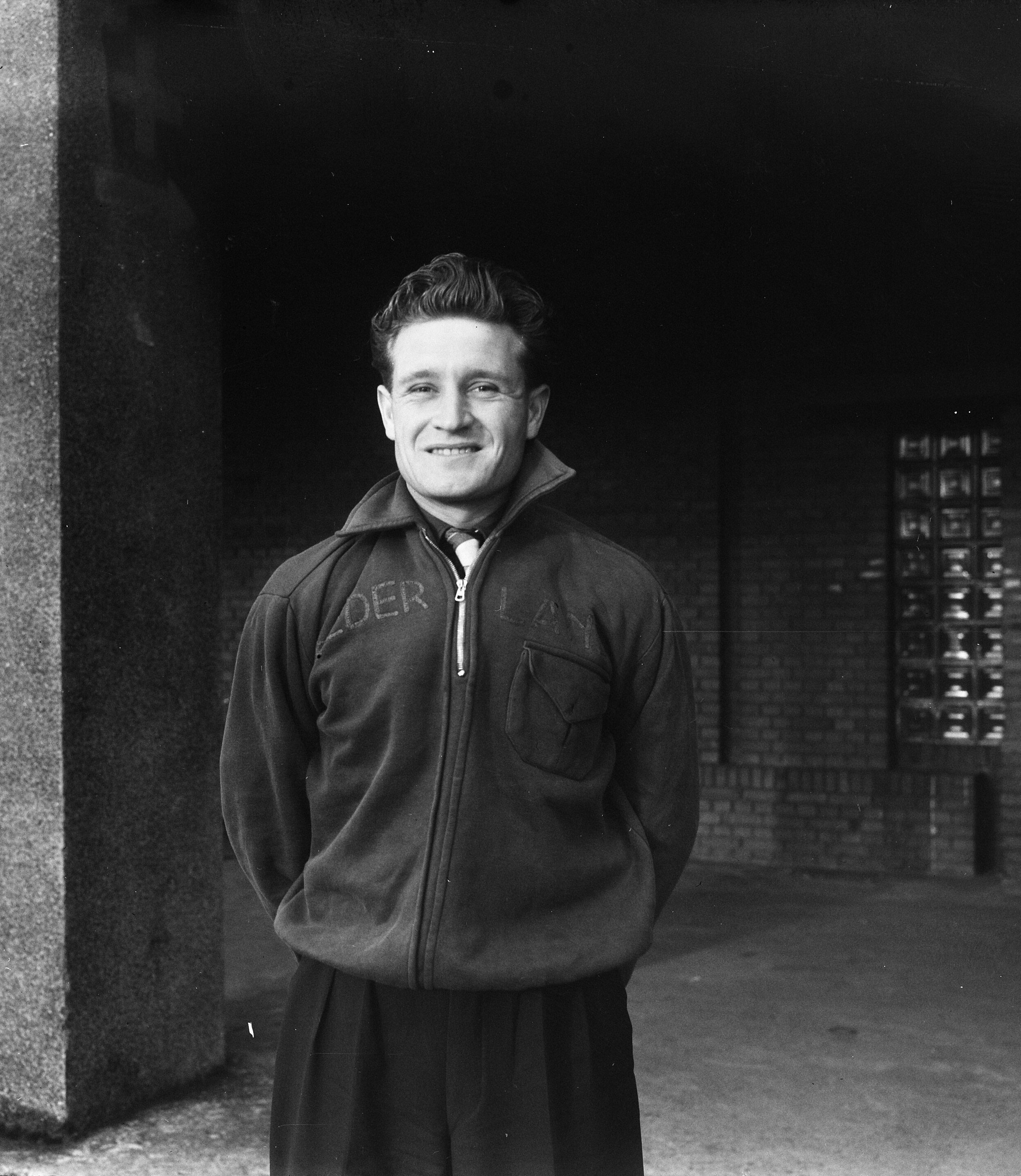
- van Beurden (1953)

Personal information
- Date of birth: 25 December 1930
- Place of birth: Berlicum, Netherlands
- Date of death: 28 October 2006 (aged 75)
- Place of death: 's-Hertogenbosch, Netherlands
- Position: Forward

Senior career*
Years	Team	Apps	(Gls)
1956–1960	BVV	86	(32)

International career
1953–1954	Netherlands	5	(1)
- * Club domestic league appearances and goals

Max van Beurden (25 December 1930 – 28 October 2006) was a Dutch footballer. He played in five matches for the Netherlands national football team from 1953 to 1954.

He played for BVV in the first ever professional Eredivisie season. He also won the 1947–48 Netherlands Football League Championship with the club.

Van Beurden died in October 2006.
