= Hubert Hammerer =

Austrian sports shooter

- Hammerer in 1960

Personal information
- Born: 10 September 1925 Egg in Vorarlberg, Vorarlberg, Austria
- Died: 24 March 2017 (aged 91) Vorarlberg
- Height: 1.72 m (5 ft 8 in)
- Weight: 78 kg (172 lb)

Sport
- Sport: Shooting
Medal record
Men's shooting
Representing Austria
Olympic Games
Gold medal – first place	1960 Rome	300 m free rifle, three positions

Hubert Hammerer (10 September 1925 – 24 March 2017) was an Austrian sports shooter. He competed at the 1960 and 1964 Olympics in five rifle events and won a gold medal in 300 m 3 positions in 1960. He was the Olympic flag bearer for Austria at the 1964 Games.
