= František Prokop =

Czech sport shooter

Personal information
- Born: September 13, 1914 Wagrain, Austria-Hungary
- Died: December 5, 1995 (aged 81)

Sport
- Sport: Sport shooting

František Prokop (13 September 1914 - December 5, 1995) was a Czech former sport shooter. He competed in the 300 metre rifle, three positions event at the 1960 Summer Olympics.
