= Omar Anas =

Sudanese sport shooter

Personal information
- Born: 1933 (age 92–93) Omdurman, Sudan

Sport
- Sport: Sports shooting

Omar Anas (born 1933) is a Sudanese former sports shooter. He competed in three events at the 1960 Summer Olympics.
