= Rein Strikwerda =

Dutch orthopedic surgeon

Rein Strikwerda

Reinder (Rein) Strikwerda (3 June 1930, Franeker – 23 October 2006, De Bilt) was a Dutch orthopedic surgeon who reached international fame by describing and treating meniscus and knee injuries, specially those injuries that are typical to occur in sports like football.

Strikwerda started his career as a physical therapist with the Dutch football club Go Ahead Eagles and later moved to FC Utrecht.

When he became more famous he worked as a freelancer and did surgery on many of the great football players. He also did surgery on his own knee to show the technique and to show how easy it was to perform the surgery.

During his life Strikwerda wrote three books:

1. "Het doping probleem" (The problem about doping), 1968
2. "Blessuretijd" (Injury time), 1999, ISBN 90-6005-769-4

He also wrote columns about sports injuries for Dutch football magazine Voetbal International for many years.
