= Julen Goikoetxea =

Spanish cyclist

Personal information
- Full name: Julen Goikoetxea Garate
- Born: 18 August 1985 Ondarroa, Spain
- Died: 6 October 2006 (aged 21) Ondarroa, Spain

Cycling career
- Sport: Cycling

Julen Goikoetxea Garate (18 August 1985 – 6 October 2006) was a Basque racing cyclist from Ondarroa.

Goikoetxea started his international career in 2004 as a member of the Alfus Tedes Garbialdi team. In his first two seasons he won five races. UCI ProTour team Euskaltel–Euskadi acknowledged his talent and contracted him for the 2007 season. Despite his success as a cyclist, he began to suffer from depression. He tried to kill himself several times before doctors took care of his health. As a result, he did not cycle any races since May 2006. On 6 October 2006 he committed suicide by jumping off his balcony.

== Major results ==
2004
1st Bergara
2005
1st Ereño
1st Antzuola
1st Elgoibar
1st Zegama
