= Adolf Lauda =

Austrian equestrian (1918–2006)

Personal information
- Full name: Adolf Franz Georg Lauda
- Nationality: Austrian
- Born: 25 September 1918 Bressanone, Kingdom of Italy
- Died: 12 October 2006 (aged 88) Innsbruck, Austria

Sport
- Sport: Equestrian

Adolf Lauda (25 September 1918 – 12 October 2006) was an Austrian equestrian. He competed in two events at the 1956 Summer Olympics.
