= Samuel B. Casey Jr. =

American businessman (1927–2006)

- Born: October 4, 1927; Squirrel Hill, Pennsylvania
- Died: October 12, 2006 (aged 79); Naples, Florida

Samuel Brown Casey Jr., (October 4, 1927 – October 12, 2006) was president of Pullman Company in the 1970s, leading the company through a series of company operation unit spin-offs.

Casey was born in Squirrel Hill, Pennsylvania (a suburb of Pittsburgh). In 1970, Casey was selected to be the chief executive officer of Pullman Company; as CEO, he oversaw construction of the company's first manufacturing plant in Russia, making Pullman one of the first American companies to operate in Russia. Casey retired from Pullman in 1980. He died in Naples, Florida, on October 12, 2006, where he had been living since 1988.
