= Solosolo Samuelu Sao =

American Samoan politician

Member of the American Samoa Senate
- In office c. 19??

Personal details
- Born: June 4, 1926; Aua, American Samoa
- Died: October 23, 2006 (aged 80)
- Political party: Independent

Solosolo Samuelu Sao (June 4, 1926 – October 23, 2006) was an American Samoan politician. An independent, he served in the American Samoa Senate.

Sao died on October 23, 2006, at the age of 80.
