= Procopius (given name) =

Procopius or Prokopios (Ancient Greek: Προκόπιος) is a given name which may refer to:

Ordered chronologically

- Procopius of Scythopolis (died 303), Christian martyr and saint
- Procopius (usurper) (326–366), Roman usurper
- Procopius (magister militum) (fl. 422–424), Roman general, descendant of the usurper and father of the Emperor Anthemius
- Procopius Anthemius, Western Roman emperor 467–472
- Procopius of Gaza (c. 465–528), Christian rhetorician
- Procopius Anthemius (son of Anthemius) (fl. 469–515), Eastern Roman Empire consul, son of Emperor Procopius Anthemius
- Procopius of Caesarea (c. 500–c. 565), Byzantine historian
- Procopius of Sázava (died 1053), Bohemian canon, hermit and Catholic saint
- Procopius of Ustyug (1243?—1303), fool for Christ (yurodivy), miracle worker and Russian Orthodox Church saint
- Prokop the Great (c. 1380–1434), Czech Hussite general, also known as Procopius the Great or Andrew Procopius
- Procopius I of Jerusalem (died 1788), Greek Orthodox Patriarch of Jerusalem
- Procopius of Constantinople (1734–1803 or 1804), Ecumenical Patriarch of Constantinople
- Procopius II of Jerusalem (died 1880), Greek Orthodox Patriarch of Jerusalem
- Prokopios Lazaridis (1859–1923), Greek Orthodox metropolitan bishop and saint
- Prokopios Pavlopoulos (born 1950), Greek lawyer and politician, President of Greece from 2015 to 2020

== See also ==
- Saint Procopius (disambiguation)
- Procopio (disambiguation)
- Prokop
