= Katarina Tomasevski =

Yugoslav politician and scholar

Katarina Tomasevski (8 February 1953 – 4 October 2006) was, from 1998 to 2004, the first United Nations Special Rapporteur on the right to education of the United Nations Commission on Human Rights. She was born in Yugoslavia, studied law at the University of Zagreb (PhD 1980) and at Harvard University (LLM 1977). She wrote more than 200 articles and taught at many universities, including University of Lund, Harvard School of Public Health, the London School of Economics, the UN University and Peking University.

== Books ==
- Responding to human rights violations, 1946–1999. Martinus Nijhoff Publishers, 2002.
- Education Denied: Costs and Remedies. Zed Books, 2003
- The State of the Right to Education Worldwide Free or Fee: 2006 Global Report.
