= Church of Saint Procopius, Žďár nad Sázavou =

Roman Catholic church in the Czech Republic

Coordinates: 49.5633°N 15.9383°E

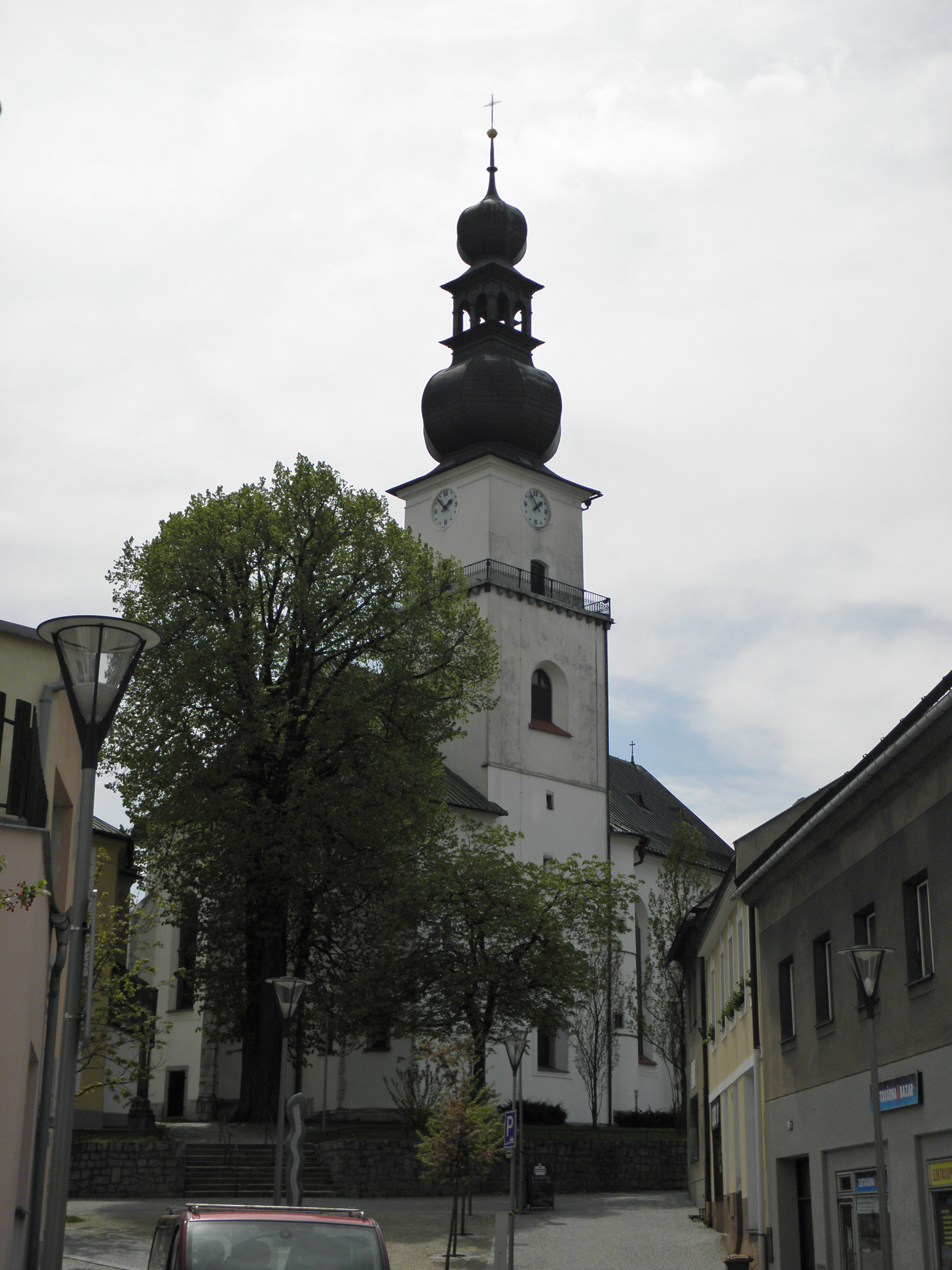
St. Procopius Church

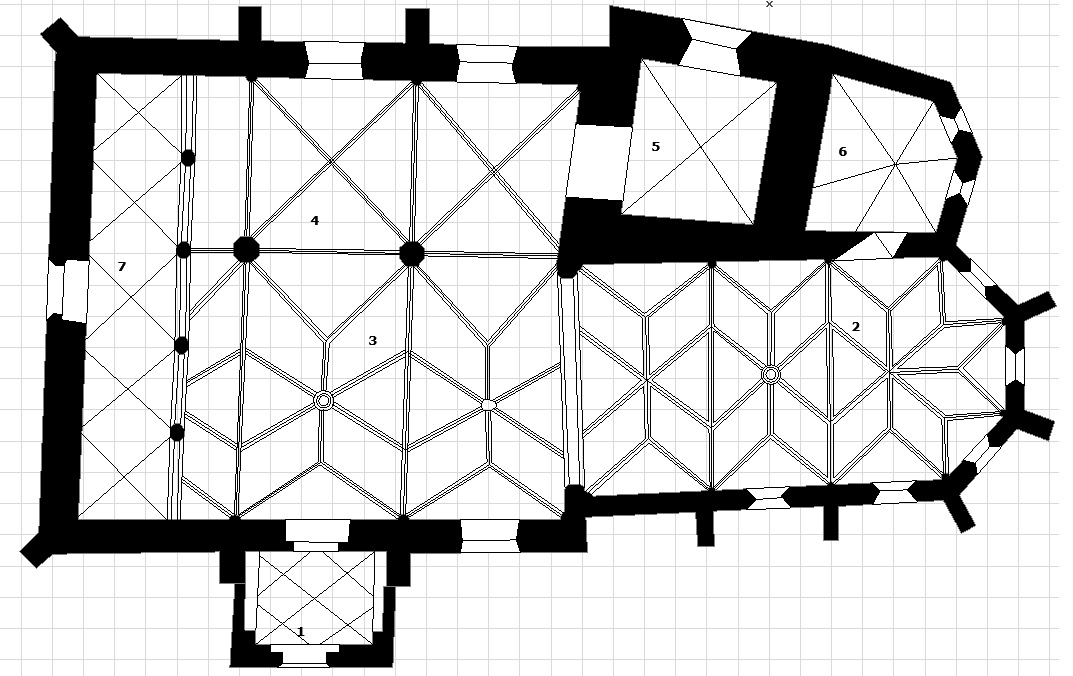
St. Procopius Church, ground plan: 1. Side entrance 2. Chancel 3. Main nave 4. Side nave 5. Confesional chapel 6. Sacristy 7. Choir

Church of Saint Procopius (Czech: Kostel svatého Prokopa) is a Roman Catholic church in Žďár nad Sázavou in the Czech Republic. It is protected as a cultural monument.

This Gothic church is situated in the centre of the town. It is not far away from the Sázava River and the square Náměstí Republiky. There is a Baroque Chapel of St. Barbara next to the church. The church is one of the important monuments in Žďár nad Sázavou.

== History ==
The date of the foundation of the church is not exactly known. It is possible, that there was a church standing at this place already in 1270, but the first trustworthy mention is dated back to 1391, written by a priest called Svatoslav. He mentioned the church and a parish office. There were several construction changes already in the early stages. The oldest walls of the church are situated in the southern part of the main nave and in the chancel. The side nave was added during the reconstruction works in the 15th century. In the same time, there was an extension of the current chancel. The next building stage took place during the 16th century. In this period, the vault of the nave was built. There was an extension of the entrance hall and the extension of the sacristy and the chapel under the tower. The western façade and the side portal were also extended. There was established a cemetery with walls and an ossuary next to the church in the 17th century. The church had two sacristies and four altars (St. Mary, St. Anne, St. Thomas, and St. Procopius). The church tower got thunderstruck. It caused a fire, which destroyed a roof. The roof was exchanged probably in 1651. The baroque extension was made during the 18th century. The vault was built in the sacristy also in 18th century. The color stained windows are dated between 1870 and 1910. In the 19th and 20th centuries, there was a renovation back to the gothic style. During the reconstruction works in 2000, the original wall paintings were discovered.

== Exterior ==
=== Basic information ===
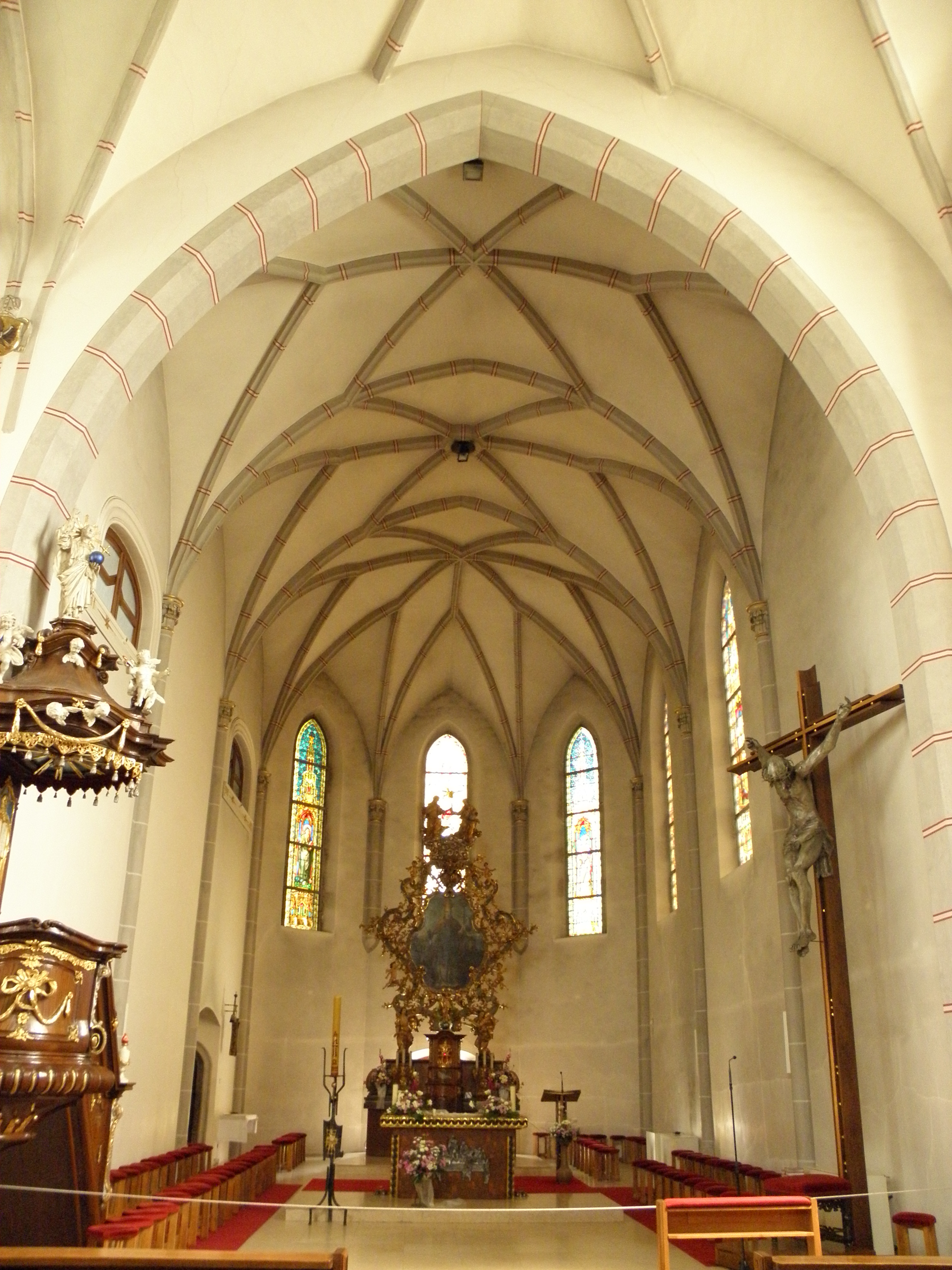
The chancel

The orientation of the church is north-eastern (the axis crossing the main nave across the altar is oriented to the northeast). The church has two asymmetric naves and it is 33.5 m long and 17.6 m wide. The height of the nave is 10.7 m.

=== Chancel ===
The chancel is finished into the shape of the five sides of the octagon. There is a sacristy and a tower in the northern part next to the chancel. The chancel is secured by pier rests resulting in very tall windows. In the end of these windows, there are pointed arches.

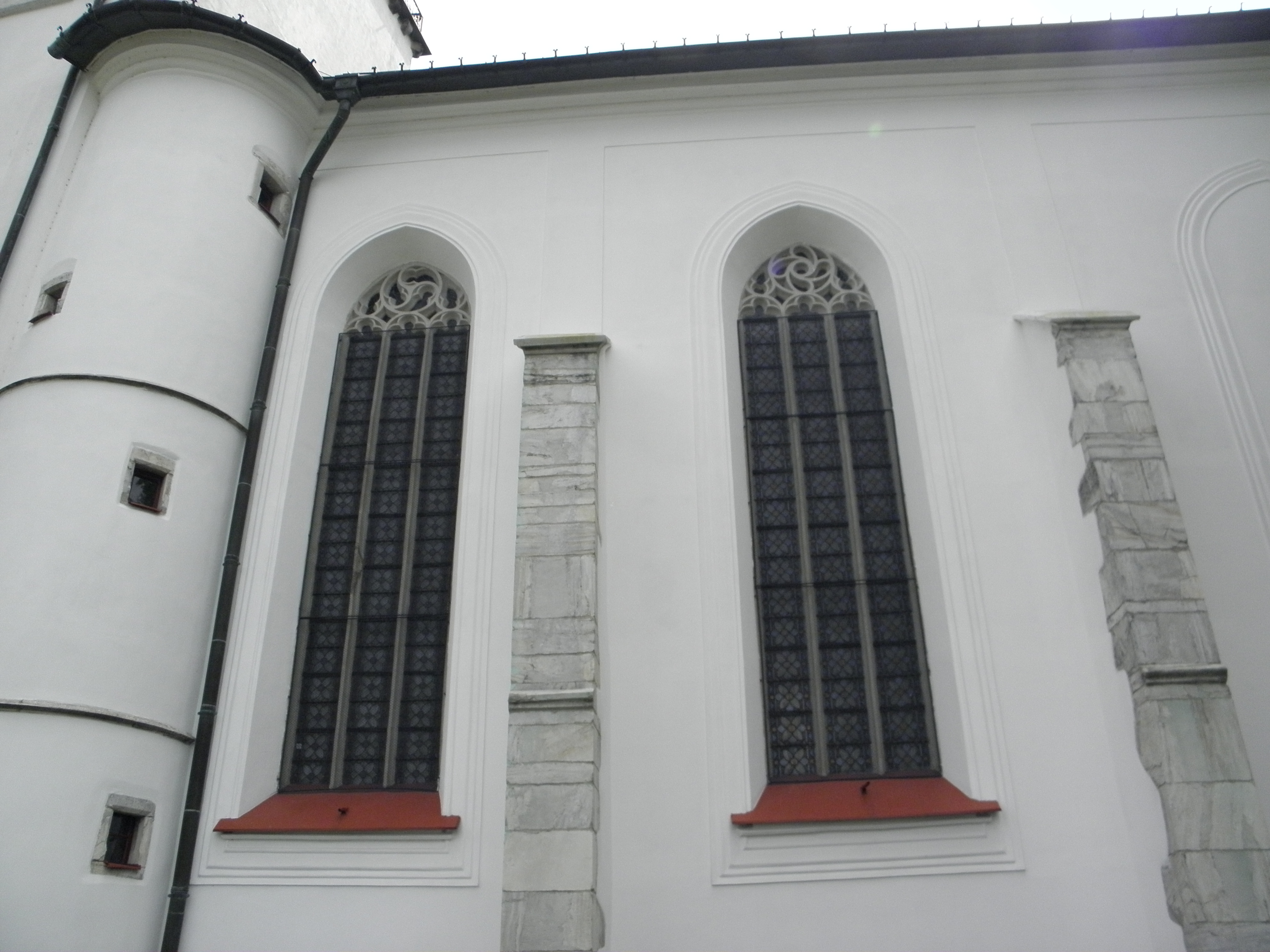
The lateral walls of the nave contain two pairs of apex windows decorated by a tracery consisting of small flames.

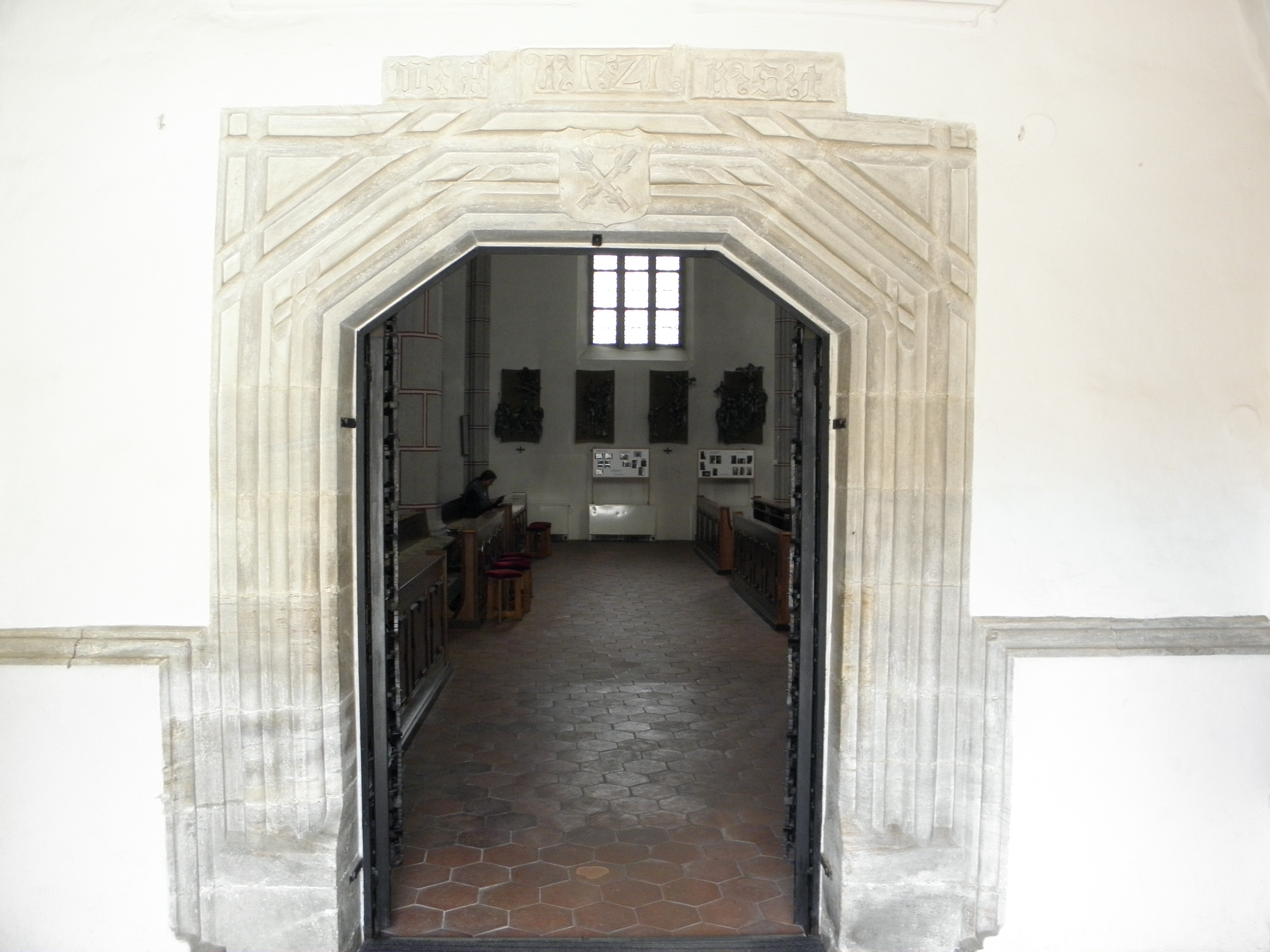
Portal with coat of arms of the house of Lichtenburks

=== Façades ===
The front façade in the west has three-part apex windows with a tracery. One of the windows contains the tracery in the form of a simple circle with cross. The façade is finished by two supporting piers and a horizontal portal. The lateral walls of the nave contain two pairs of apex windows decorated by a tracery consisting of small flames. The other windows contain several other types of tracery. In the northern and southern walls there are two supporting piers. There is a side entrance on the southern side, which includes a small annex with portal. We can find the coat of arms of the house of Lichtenburks here and an inscription dated back to the late Gothic period. The church was built using the longwall system (not the carcass system, as it was typical for this period).

== Interior ==
There are two naves inside the church. They do not have the same width, the southern nave is almost twice wider than the northern nave. On the axis of the northern nave, there is a confessional chapel and sacristy. The sacristy is situated under the church's tower. There is a chancel, on the axis of the southern nave. The chancel is vaulted by a net vault. Both naves are separated by two octagonal pillars that carry the weight of the arch. The pillars are decorated by paintings, which resemble the construction block stones. The difference between both naves is not only in size, but also in the type of vaulting. The narrower northern nave is vaulted by three bays of a crossing arch. In the wider southern nave, there is a net vault divided into three bays. The southern nave and the chancel are separated by a triumphal arch. The chancel is slightly narrower than the nave. There is a chapel under the tower behind the northern nave. This chapel is vaulted and there is a sacristy behind it and an oratory above it.

=== Heraldic symbols ===
The groins are made of stone, they are coarsely finished with gutters. The groins are finished on the three-part piers with heraldic elements and decorated by paintings. Thin groins with gutters are decorated in the same style as the poles. The heraldic symbols are displayed in the poles, which are connected to piers. The heads of piers in the chancel are decorated by vegetable motives at the connection of piers and arches. The heraldic symbols are the seven coats of arms of the founders and builders of the local monastery. The first coat of arms belongs to the house of Lemberk (this coat of arms is created by swallows and it is placed above the side entrance). The other coats of arms belong to the house of Lichtenburks (two crossed "ostrve" - branches used as a ladder), to Boček of Obřany (the eagle), to the house of Kunštát (black stripes), to the duke of Münsterberk (the Silesian eagle carrying a jewel with black stripes on its chest). There is also the coat of arms of the emperor Rudolf II. His coat of arms can be found in the northern part. The coat of arms of the abbot Václav Vejmluva is placed on the wall of the triumphal arch and the next coat of arms belongs to Lichtenburks.

=== Music gallery ===
Piers in the eastern part of the chancel are finished in about half of the wall above the ground. There is a music gallery on the western side of the church. The gallery is stretched above the width of both naves and it is supported by four octagonal pillars. The pillars are connected by arches. The space under the music gallery is vaulted by ribe – like.

== Tower ==
The tower of the church is 53 meters high. It has a trapezoidal ground plan (we can see three walls from the south) and it abuts against the chancel. Its walls have some sparse rectangular windows. However, there is an exception in the last floor, where there are vaulted windows. The tower has a bulbous roof with lantern.

== Furnishings ==
The most important properties of the church are the baptismal font (1624) and the altar of Our Lady from 15th century. There are also fifteen stops of the way of the cross by the academic sculptor Karel Stádník who also created the sculpture Man of Sorrows, which can be found standing near the southern wall of the chancel, very close to the baptistery. On the other side of the chancel, there is a wooden baroque pulpit. The pulpit is decorated with the boards of Ten Commandments and the sculpture of Jesus Christ at the top. The new main front-facing altar with the remains of St. Procopius was created by Karel Stádník in 1984. The pseudo-gothic altar from 1909 was replaced by the current altar with a sanctuary and a painting of St. Procopius. Its creator was the woodcarver J. J. Charem. The modern organ (1988) stands on the late Gothic organloft.

== Gallery ==
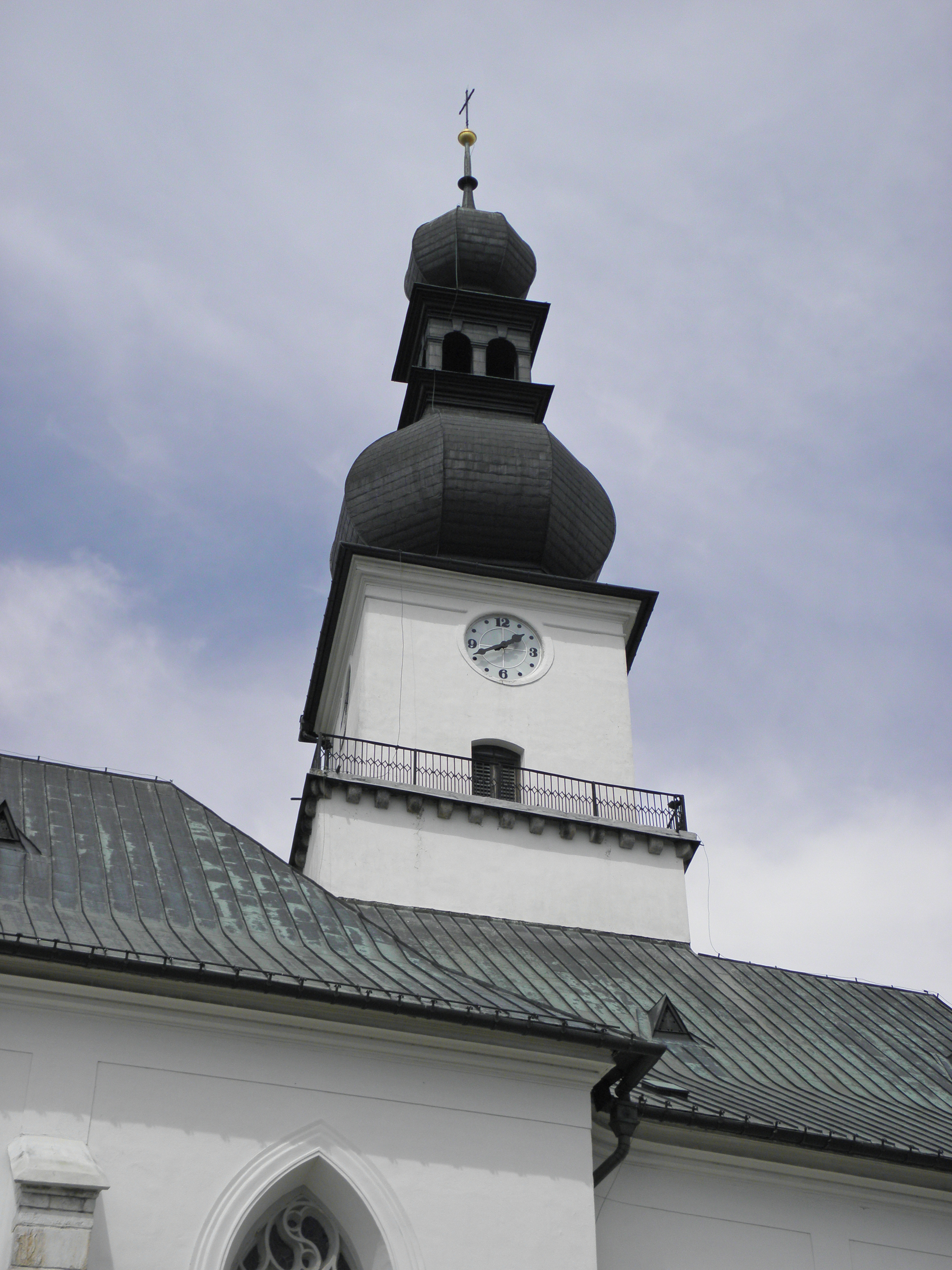
The tower of the church

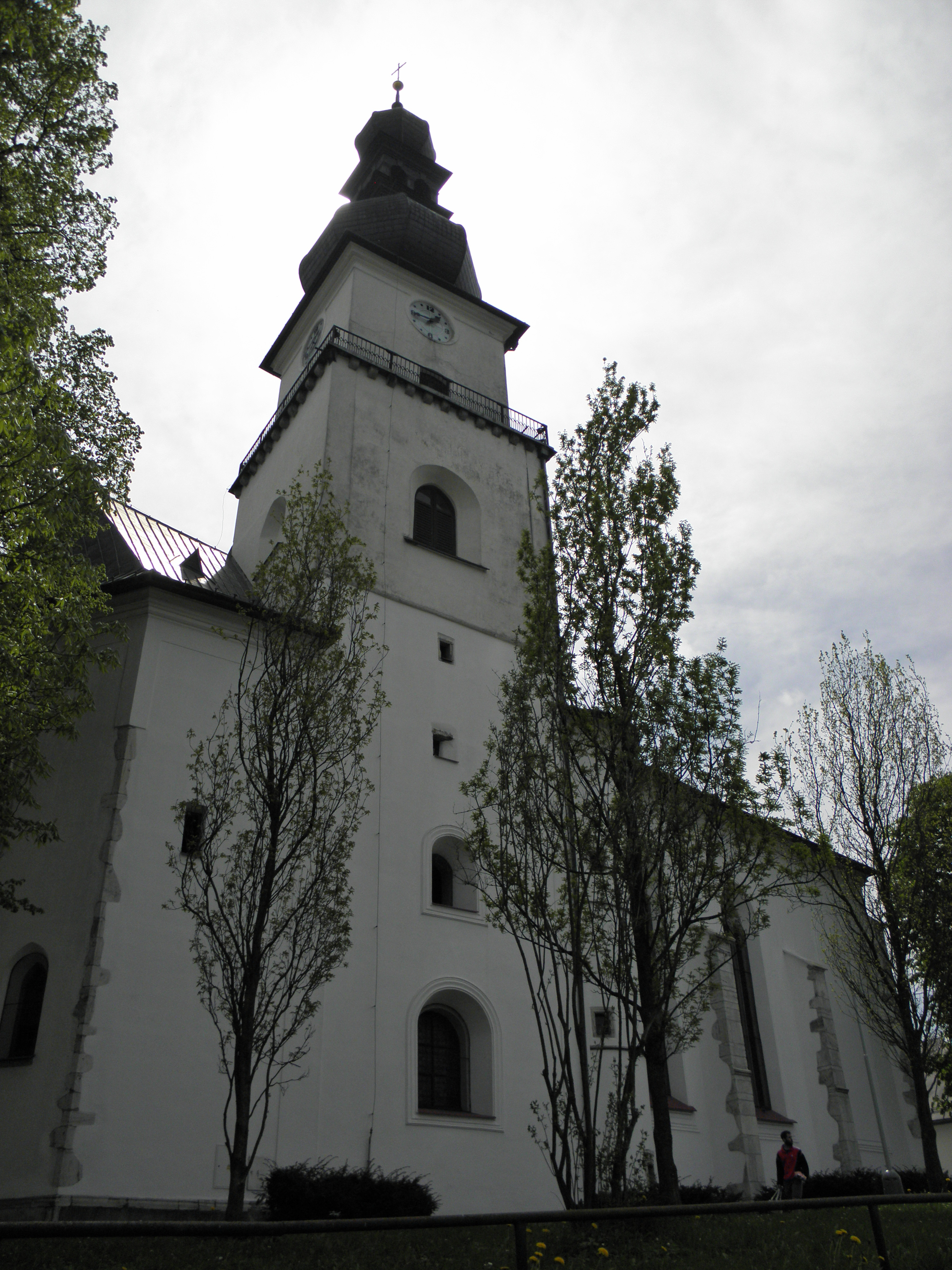
The tower, eastern view

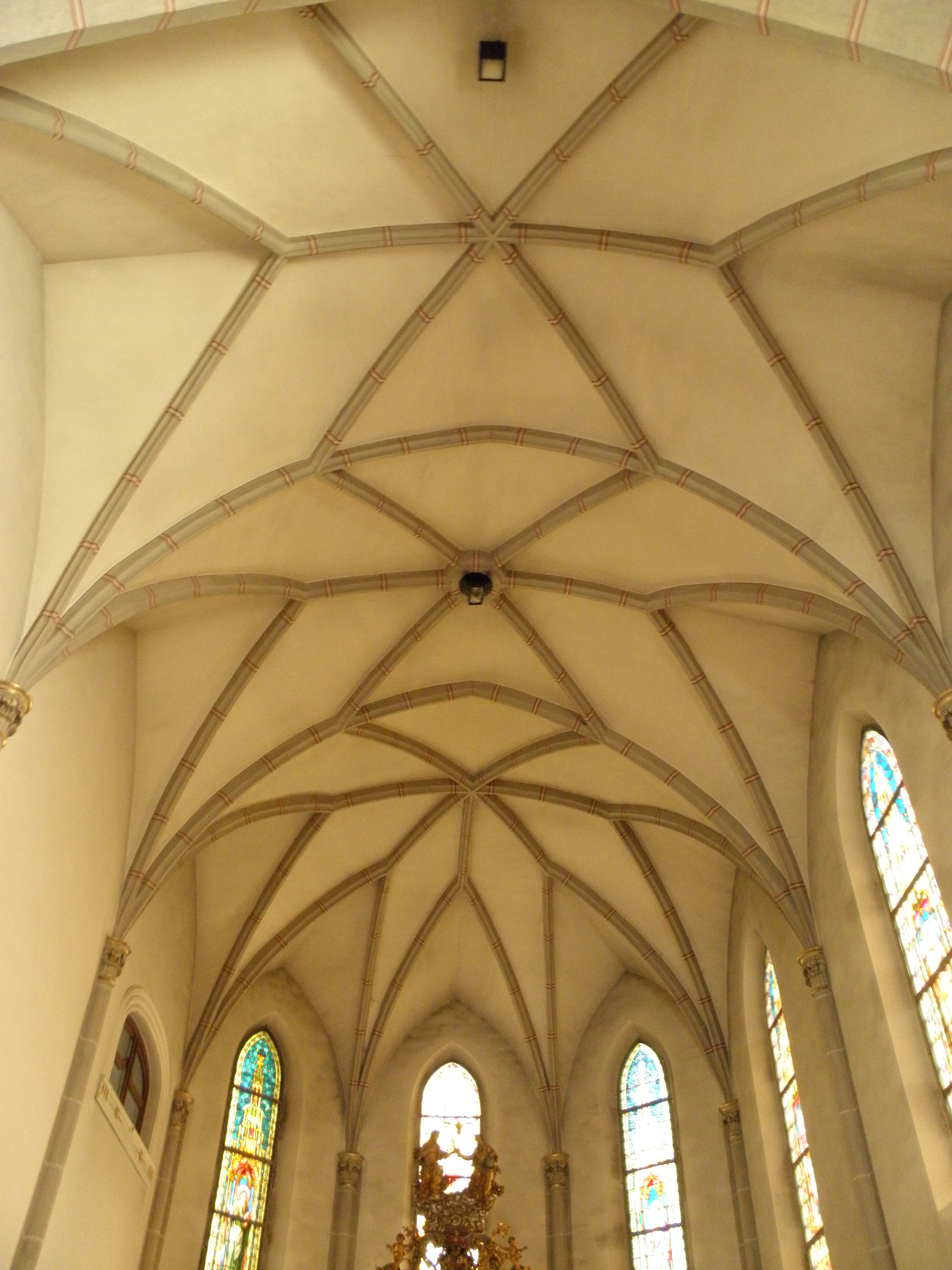
Detail of the vault in main nave and in the chancel

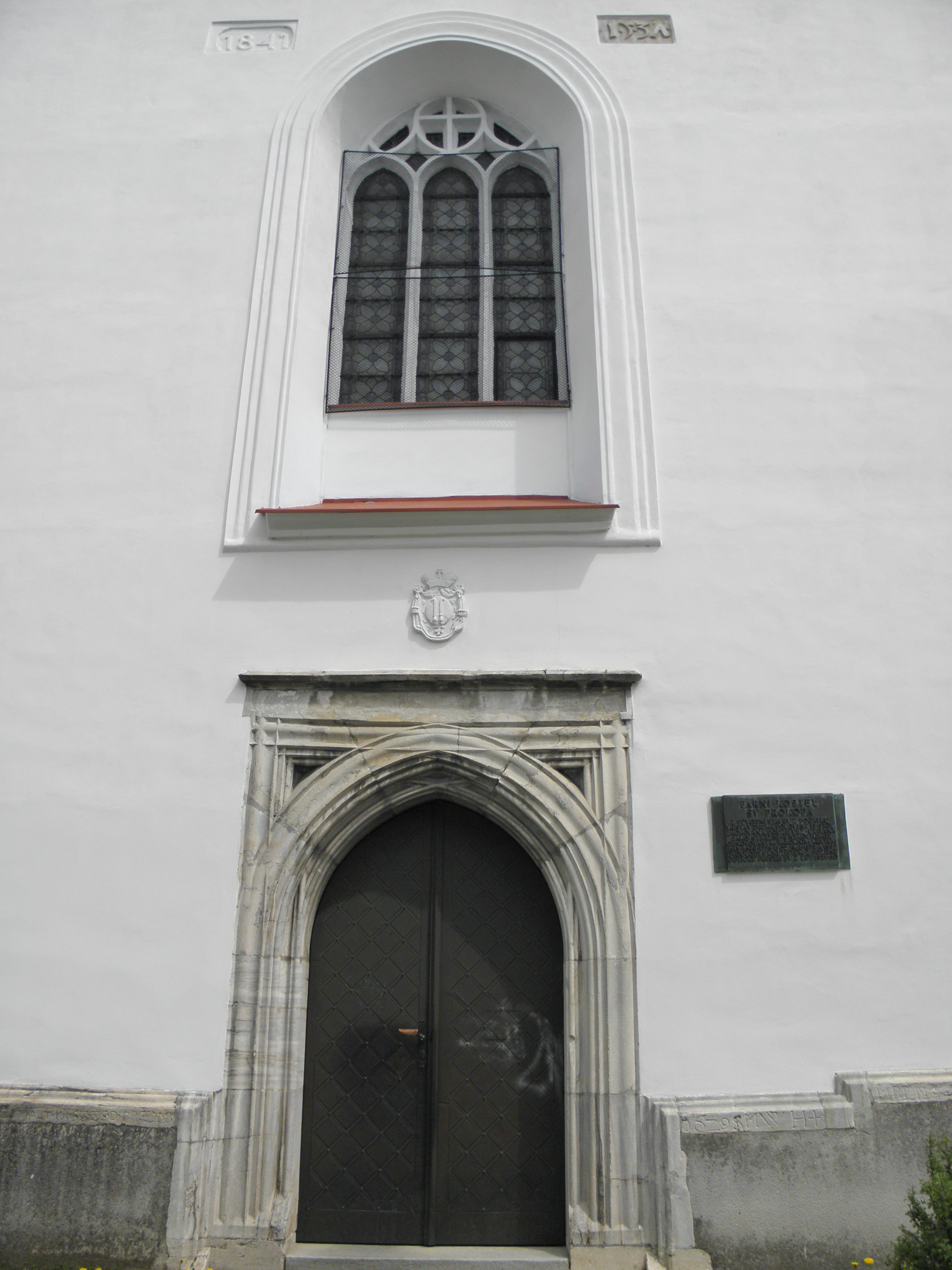
The west entrance

== Bibliography ==
- Svoboda, J. F.: Vlastivěda moravská. II. Místopis. Žďárský okres. vyd. Musejní spolek v Brně, V Brně 1937.
- Zemek, M., Bartušek, A.: Dějiny Žďáru nad Sázavou. I. 1252–1617. vyd. Krajské nakladatelství Havlíčkův Brod, 1956.
- Lopaur, M.: Žďárský uličník, Město Žďár, vyd. Město Žďár nad Sázavou 2012.
