= Michael Johnson (murderer, born 1977) =

American murderer (1977–2006)

- Born: May 27, 1977; Texas, U.S.
- Died: October 19, 2006 (aged 29); Livingston, Texas, U.S.
- Cause of death: Suicide
- Motive: Robbery
- Conviction: Capital murder
- Penalty: Death

Michael Dewayne Johnson (May 27, 1977 – October 19, 2006) was a criminal sentenced to death for the 1995 murder of Jeff Wetterman. Johnson committed suicide 15 hours before his scheduled execution.

== Murder case ==
On September 9, 1995, on his 17th birthday, David Noel Vest went to visit 18-year-old Michael Johnson at his home in Balch Springs, near Dallas, Texas. At the house, Vest noticed a 9mm pistol lying on a table.

Later that day, Vest was at home when some other friends dropped by in a stolen Cadillac. Vest went out with his friends, driving them each to their homes until he was the last one left in the car. Vest then saw Johnson in a parking lot, talking on a public telephone. He pulled over and picked up his friend, and the two drove to Johnson's house. Johnson went inside and returned with the 9mm pistol tucked into the waistband of his trousers. The pair drove around for a while then headed towards the Texas coast during the night, aiming to spend the following day at the beach, at Corpus Christi, to celebrate Vest's birthday.

Near the town of Waco, the two noticed that the Cadillac was running low on fuel. Only having 4 dollars each, they decided to make a "gas run" (filling the car up with gasoline and then speeding off without paying). Johnson took the wheel and they drove to two separate gas stations but decided the circumstances were unfavorable at both. Around 7:00 a.m. on September 10, they drove to a Fastime convenience store/gas station, near an Interstate 35 exit ramp in Lorena, Texas. The service station was a family business, run by 27-year-old Jeff Wetterman, a tall man of 6 feet 7 inches (2.01 meters). Vest and Johnson drove into the forecourt of the service station. Wetterman came out to fill the car with gasoline, as was custom at the full-service station. Knowing they did not have money to pay for the $24 worth of fuel, and afraid that Wetterman would alert the police if they drove off, one of the two young men shot Wetterman in the face with the pistol, severing his spinal cord. A female employee of the Fastime service station would later testify that after the sound of the shot, she looked out and saw Wetterman sitting on the ground with a blond-haired man standing beside the passenger door of the Cadillac. Vest and Johnson would each later claim it was the other who shot and killed Wetterman.

The pair then drove to Corpus Christi. They sold the gun to a trucker for $35, which they used to buy gasoline, drinks, and cigarettes and then returned to the Dallas area later that day.

== Trial ==
Vest pleaded guilty to aggravated robbery and received an eight-year prison sentence. Part of his plea bargain was that he would testify against Johnson.

Johnson was indicted for murder before a McLennan County grand jury on November 29, 1995.

Vest testified that at the service station, he had exited the car from the passenger's side and begun filling the car with gasoline. Wetterman came out to assist and began talking to Vest. Johnson then exited the car from the driver's side and walked to the back of the vehicle. Vest asked him if he had the gun on him, and Johnson responded by lifting his shirt to display the pistol tucked into his trousers. As Vest replaced the fuel dispenser, he heard a shot and looked around to see Wetterman falling to the ground. Vest and Johnson hurried into the car and sped away.

Another friend testified that Johnson bragged about the incident in the following days. He said Johnson admitted to the shooting, saying he shot Wetterman in the face after he thought he heard Vest say "Shoot". Other friends testified that Johnson made fun of Vest for crying after the incident.

Johnson initially tried to say that he had an alibi and was at home on the day of the murder but after his arrest he admitted to a psychologist that he had been present at the time of the killing. Physical evidence also placed him at the scene, in the form of DNA collected from hairs and cigarette butts found in the Cadillac.

At trial, Johnson did not testify in his own defense but later told reporters that Vest murdered Wetterman. Johnson maintained that he had been driving but remained in the car while Vest got out to fill the car with gasoline. Johnson said he did not even see Wetterman. He said that Vest shot the attendant and then yelled, "Go, go, go!", and jumped back into the car.

While Johnson had no previous convictions, several witnesses described violent incidents in his past. His former girlfriend said that he had beaten her after accusing her of "sleeping around". Other friends testified that Johnson had attacked a man with a knife; aimed a gun at a neighbor during a confrontation; attempted to run a man over and had once run over a cat and then reversed over it to ensure that it was dead. A man testified that Johnson had responded, "So what?" when told that the victim in his murder trial was married.

On May 6, 1996, Johnson was found guilty of murder. Two days later he was sentenced to death by lethal injection. As the verdict was read out, he turned and screamed obscenities at the Wetterman family.

== Aftermath and death ==
After the verdict, Johnson was on death row at the Ellis 1 Unit located in Huntsville, Texas, for almost 10 years. He received several stays of execution and lodged numerous appeals. One of these appeals was a confession supposedly signed by Vest after the two were arrested.

Johnson's attorney appealed to the Supreme Court, arguing that Vest's confession had been improperly suppressed by the prosecutors. Police later explained that the two men had both been indicted as if they were the shooters; Vest's signature was to affirm that the indictment was correct and was not in any way a confession.

The court's verdict was affirmed by the Texas Court of Criminal Appeals in 1997 and a judicial review appeal to the Supreme Court was denied in 1998. An application for a writ of habeas corpus was denied in 2000. Three other appeals and attempts at judicial review were lodged but all failed.

Johnson's execution date was set for 6 pm on October 19, 2006. Johnson was put on suicide watch 36 hours before the execution, and he was checked every 15 minutes. Johnson refused a last meal.

At 2:45 am on October 19, 2006, Johnson was found, unresponsive, in a pool of blood in his cell in the Texas Department of Criminal Justice Polunsky Unit. He had sliced open his right jugular vein and an artery inside his right elbow with a razor blade attached to a Popsicle stick, tied on with dental floss. He had written on his cell wall in his own blood "I didn't do it". He was pronounced dead at 3:40 A.M. at a nearby hospital.

Prison system spokeswoman Michelle Lyons said that 15 minutes before Johnson was discovered, he was talking to the staff and awaiting breakfast, and gave no indication he was contemplating suicide.

His lawyer, Greg White, said he had seen no indication that Johnson was despondent, saying that had "never seen him not in good spirits. I'm not trained in those things, but just from a common person's standpoint, we just never had conversation that he was near the end and 'I'm doomed' and any of that kind of stuff."
