= Prokop =

Prokop is a given name and a surname derived from Procopius. It may refer to:

== Given name ==
Either of two Hussite generals, both of whom died in the 1434 battle of Lipan:

- Prokop the Great
- Prokop the Lesser

Other people who bore the name Prokop:

- Procopius, 6c historian
- Saint Prokop, or Procopius of Sázava (died 1053), a Czech saint
- Prokop, bishop of Kraków (1292–1294)
- Adolf Prokop, German football referee
- Prokop of Moravia

== Surname ==
- Bohumír Prokop, Czech handballer
- František Prokop, Czech sport shooter
- Gerhard Prokop, German football manager
- Gert Prokop, German writer
- Gunnar Prokop (born 1940), Austrian handball coach
- Hubert Prokop (basketball), Czech basketball player
- Joe Prokop (born 1960), American football player
- Joe Prokop (halfback) (1921–1995), American football player
- John Prokop (born 2001), American ice hockey player
- Ladislav Prokop, Czech basketball player
- Liese Prokop, Austrian athlete and politician
- Luke Prokop (born 2002), Canadian ice hockey player
- Martin Prokop, Czech rally driver
- Matt Prokop, American actor
- Rose Prokop (1897–1973), American politician
- Skip Prokop, Canadian musician
- Stanley A. Prokop, U.S. Congressman for Pennsylvania (1959–1961)

== See also ==
- Procope (disambiguation)
