= Mikołaj z Szadka Prokopowicz =

Mikołaj z Szadka Prokopowicz (1489–1564) was a Polish academic.

Mikołaj z Szadka began his studies in Kraków in 1504/05. He had previously studied in Poznań and Głogów. While in the Polish royal city, Mikołaj found a number of mentors, most important among whom were Stanisław Zaborowski from Sieradz, the political writer and custodian of the royal treasury on Wawel (lat. custos Regni), and also Maciej Miechowita, who promoted Mikołaj's interests in mathematics, astronomy, geography, and above all astrology. In 1512, Mikołaj received his master's degree in philosophy, and he became a professor of astrology three years later in 1515. In 1523 he was the dean of the faculty of philosophy, and in 1534, after earning his doctorate in theology, he began teaching in that faculty. In 1548 he reached the highest administrative rung of the university: rector of the Kraków Academy. Between 1548 and 1561, he filled that role nine times. Having humanist sympathies, Mikołaj was friends with many of humanists and important intellectuals of renaissance Kraków. He loved beautiful books and owned a substantial library. From 1519 he was the curator of the university library, serving as an unusually zealous guardian of the collection. He wrote a number of works including official Polish-language calendars, one of which was published by Hieronymus Vietor in 1528, as well as astrological forecasts.

== Bibliography ==
- Barycz, Henryk. "Mikołaj z Szadka (1489-1564)." In s. 138-140) Polski Słownik Biograficzny, vol. 21, 138-40. Kraków: Polska Akademia Nauk, 1976.
