= Fencing at the 1960 Summer Olympics – Men's sabre =

Fencing at the Olympics

Men's sabre at the Games of the XVII Olympiad
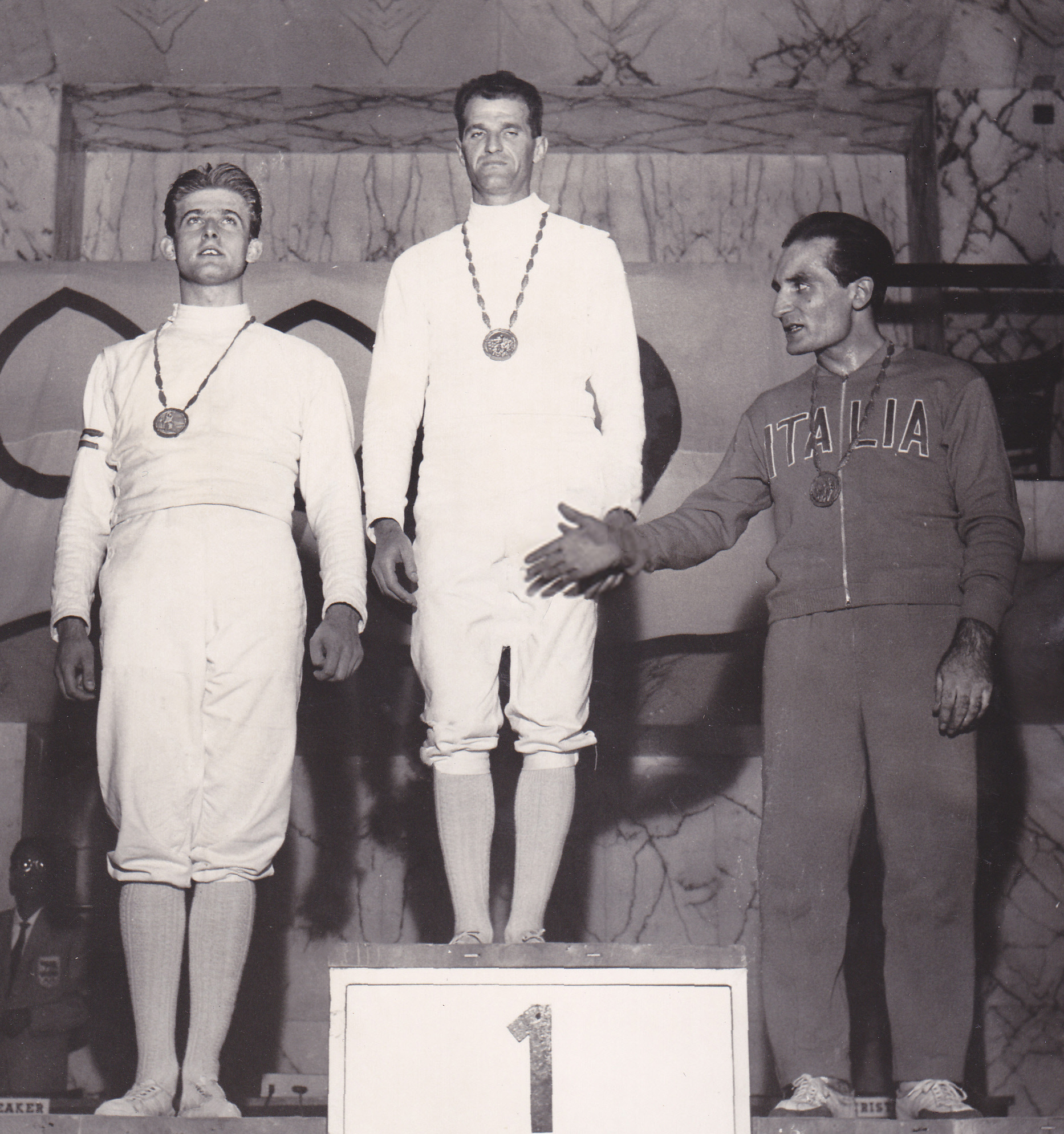
- Zoltán Horváth, Rudolf Kárpáti and Wladimiro Calarese
- Venue: Palazzo dei Congressi
- Dates: 7–8 September
- Competitors: 70 from 29 nations

Medalists
1st place, gold medalist(s)		Rudolf Kárpáti	Hungary
2nd place, silver medalist(s)		Zoltán Horváth	Hungary
3rd place, bronze medalist(s)		Wladimiro Calarese	Italy

The men's sabre was one of eight fencing events on the fencing at the 1960 Summer Olympics programme. It was the fourteenth appearance of the event. The competition was held from 7 to 8 September 1960. 70 fencers from 29 nations competed. Nations had been limited to three fencers each since 1928. The event was won by Rudolf Kárpáti, the eighth of nine straight Games in which a Hungarian would win the event. Kárpáti was the second man to successfully defend an Olympic title in the men's sabre (Jenő Fuchs in 1908 and 1912) and fifth to win multiple medals of any color. His teammate Zoltán Horváth took silver while Wladimiro Calarese of Italy finished with the bronze.

== Background ==
This was the 14th appearance of the event, which is the only fencing event to have been held at every Summer Olympics. Five of the eight finalists from 1956 returned: gold medalist Rudolf Kárpáti of Hungary, silver medalist Jerzy Pawłowski of Poland (who, in 1968, would finally break the Hungarian run of nine straight gold medals in the event), fourth-place finisher Jacques Lefèvre of France, fifth-place finisher (and three-time medalist, with bronze in 1936, gold in 1948, and silver in 1952) Aladár Gerevich of Hungary, and sixth-place finisher Wojciech Zabłocki of Poland. The three world champions since the last Olympics were Pawłowski (1957), Yakov Rylsky of the Soviet Union (1958), and Kárpáti (1959).

Israel, Morocco, New Zealand, Tunisia, and Vietnam each made their debut in the men's sabre. Italy made its 12th appearance in the event, most of any nation, having missed the inaugural 1896 event and the 1904 Olympics.

== Competition format ==
The competition used a pool play format, with each fencer facing the other fencers in the pool in a round robin. Bouts were to 5 touches. Barrages were used to break ties necessary for advancement. However, only as much fencing was done as was necessary to determine advancement, so some bouts never occurred if the fencers advancing from the pool could be determined. The competition involved 5 rounds:

- Round 1: 12 pools, 6 fencers to a pool (two pools had 5 due to withdrawals), top 3 advance (total 36 advancing)
- Round 2: 6 pools, 6 fencers to a pool, top 4 advance (total 24 advancing)
- Quarterfinals: 4 pools, 6 fencers to a pool, top 3 advance (total 12 advancing)
- Semifinals: 2 pools, 6 fencers to a pool, top 4 advance (total 8 advancing)
- Final: 1 pool, 8 fencers

== Schedule ==
All times are Central European Time (UTC+1)

Date	Time	Round
Wednesday, 7 September 1960	8:30; 15:00	Round 1 Round 2
Thursday, 8 August 1960	8:30; 13:00; 15:00	Quarterfinals; Semifinals; Final

== Results ==
=== Round 1 ===
The top three fencers in each pool advanced.

==== Round 1 Pool A ====
Pos	Fencer	W	L	TF	TA	Notes	CA	WW	AD	AG	OA	JK
1	Claude Arabo (FRA)	4	0	20	11	Q		5–4	5–3	5–2	5–2	
2	Wilfried Wöhler (EUA)	3	1	19	7	Q	4–5			5–1	5–0	5–1
3	Asen Dyakovski (BUL)	3	1	18	10	Q	3–5			5–1	5–1	5–3
4	Augusto Gutiérrez (VEN)	1	3	9	19		2–5	1–5	1–5			5–4
5	Orlando Azinhais (POR)	0	3	3	15		2–5	0–5	1–5			
6	Jean Khayat (TUN)	0	3	8	15			1–5	3–5	4–5		

Source: Official Report, p. 818
Legend: Blue = left column team win; Yellow = draw; Red = top row team win.

==== Round 1 Pool B ====
Pos	Fencer	W	L	TF	TA	Notes	WC	NA	GU	MS	PO	AS
1	Wladimiro Calarese (ITA)	4	0	20	6	Q		5–2	5–1	5–2	5–1	
2	Nugzar Asatiani (URS)	3	1	17	9	Q	2–5			5–3	5–0	5–1
3	Günther Ulrich (AUT)	3	1	16	11	Q	1–5			5–3	5–2	5–1
4	Michael Sichel (AUS)	1	3	13	16		2–5	3–5	3–5			5–1
5	Pablo Ordejón (ESP)	0	3	3	15		1–5	0–5	2–5			
6	Abderrahman Sebti (MAR)	0	3	3	15			1–5	1–5	1–5		

Source: Official Report, p. 818
Legend: Blue = left column team win; Yellow = draw; Red = top row team win.

==== Round 1 Pool C ====
Menendez of Cuba was entered in this pool, but did not start.

Pos	Fencer	W	L	TF	TA	Notes	JT	RZ	BS	TO	JBG
1	Jürgen Theuerkauff (EUA)	4	0	20	9	Q		5–4	5–2	5–1	5–2
2	Ryszard Zub (POL)	3	1	19	13	Q	4–5		5–3	5–3	5–2
3	Boris Stavrev (BUL)	2	2	15	12	Q	2–5	3–5		5–0	5–2
4	Tsugeo Ozawa (JPN)	1	3	9	17		1–5	3–5	0–5		5–2
5	Jacques Ben Gualid (MAR)	0	4	8	20		2–5	2–5	2–5	2–5	

Source: Official Report, p. 819
Legend: Blue = left column team win; Yellow = draw; Red = top row team win.

==== Round 1 Pool D ====
Pos	Fencer	W	L	TF	TA	Notes	JP	JVB	JW	BR	CdD	LG
1	Jerzy Pawłowski (POL)	5	0	25	10	Q		5–1	5–3	5–2	5–3	5–1
2	José Van Baelen (BEL)	4	1	21	13	Q	1–5		5–4	5–2	5–1	5–1
3	Josef Wanetschek (AUT)	2	3	20	17	B	3–5	4–5		3–5	5–1	5–1
3	Benito Ramos (MEX)	2	3	18	20	B	2–5	2–5	5–3		4–5	5–2
3	César de Diego (ESP)	2	3	15	22	B	3–5	1–5	1–5	5–4		5–3
6	Luis García (VEN)	0	5	8	25		1–5	1–5	1–5	2–5	3–5	

Source: Official Report, p. 819
Legend: Blue = left column team win; Yellow = draw; Red = top row team win.

Barrage

Pos	Fencer	W	L	TF	TA	Notes	JW	BR	CdD
3	Josef Wanetschek (AUT)	2	0	10	6	Q		5–3	5–3
4	Benito Ramos (MEX)	1	2	3	5		3–5		
5	César de Diego (ESP)	1	2	3	5		3–5		

Source: Official Report, p. 819
Legend: Blue = left column team win; Yellow = draw; Red = top row team win.

==== Round 1 Pool E ====
Pos	Fencer	W	L	TF	TA	Notes	YR	LR	SL	JR	WF	JD
1	Yakov Rylsky (URS)	4	1	22	8	Q		2–5	5–1	5–2	5–0	5–0
2	Ladislau Rohony (ROU)	4	1	24	9	Q	5–2		4–5	5–1	5–0	5–1
3	Sandy Leckie (GBR)	3	2	18	18	Q	1–5	5–4		2–5	5–2	5–2
4	Juan Larrea (ARG)	2	3	15	17		2–5	1–5	5–2		2–5	5–0
5	William Fajardo (MEX)	2	3	12	20		0–5	0–5	2–5	5–2		5–3
6	Jaime Duque (COL)	0	5	6	25		0–5	1–5	2–5	0–5	3–5	

Source: Official Report, p. 819
Legend: Blue = left column team win; Yellow = draw; Red = top row team win.

==== Round 1 Pool F ====
Pos	Fencer	W	L	TF	TA	Notes	ZH	JR	DS	RM	SF	AM
1	Zoltán Horváth (HUN)	4	0	20	8	Q			5–1	5–4	5–0	5–3
2	Jacques Roulot (FRA)	3	0	15	5	Q				5–3	5–1	5–1
3	Daniel Sande (ARG)	3	1	16	13	Q	1–5			5–4	5–2	5–2
4	Ramón Martínez (ESP)	1	3	16	17		4–5	3–5	4–5		5–2	
5	Sonosuke Fujimaki (JPN)	0	4	5	20		0–5	1–5	2–5	2–5		
6	António Marquilhas (POR)	0	3	6	15		3–5	1–5	2–5			

Source: Official Report, p. 820
Legend: Blue = left column team win; Yellow = draw; Red = top row team win.

==== Round 1 Pool G ====
Pos	Fencer	W	L	TF	TA	Notes	DT	WK	AV	GV	PF	AA
1	David Tyshler (URS)	5	0	25	10	Q		5–3	5–2	5–1	5–3	5–1
2	Walter Köstner (EUA)	4	1	23	12	Q	3–5		5–3	5–1	5–2	5–1
3	Aleksandar Vasin (YUG)	2	3	19	18	B	2–5	3–5		4–5	5–2	5–1
3	Gustavo Vassallo (ARG)	2	3	16	21	B	1–5	1–5	5–4		4–5	5–2
3	Palle Frey (DEN)	2	3	17	20	B	3–5	2–5	2–5	5–4		5–1
6	Ali Annabi (TUN)	0	5	6	25		1–5	1–5	1–5	2–5	1–5	

Source: Official Report, p. 820
Legend: Blue = left column team win; Yellow = draw; Red = top row team win.

Barrage

Pos	Fencer	W	L	TF	TA	Notes	AV	GV	PF
3	Aleksandar Vasin (YUG)	1	1	7	9	Q		5–4	2–5
4	Gustavo Vassallo (ARG)	1	1	9	6		4–5		5–1
5	Palle Frey (DEN)	1	1	6	7		5–2	1–5	

Source: Official Report, p. 820
Legend: Blue = left column team win; Yellow = draw; Red = top row team win.

==== Round 1 Pool H ====
Pos	Fencer	W	L	TF	TA	Notes	RF	DM	AM	RC	RB	EE
1	Roberto Ferrari (ITA)	4	1	23	12	Q		3–5	5–4	5–1	5–2	5–0
2	Dumitru Mustață (ROU)	4	1	22	14	Q	5–3		2–5	5–3	5–2	5–1
3	Alfonso Morales (USA)	3	2	23	16	B	4–5	5–2		4–5	5–2	5–2
3	Ralph Cooperman (GBR)	3	2	19	19	B	1–5	3–5	5–4		5–4	5–1
5	Raoul Barouch (TUN)	1	4	15	21		2–5	2–5	2–5	4–5		5–1
6	Emilio Echeverry (COL)	0	5	5	25		0–5	1–5	2–5	1–5	1–5	

Source: Official Report, p. 820
Legend: Blue = left column team win; Yellow = draw; Red = top row team win.

Barrage

Pos	Fencer	W	L	TF	TA	Notes	AM	RC
3	Alfonso Morales (USA)	1	0	5	2	Q		5–2
4	Ralph Cooperman (GBR)	0	1	2	5		2–5	

Source: Official Report, p. 820
Legend: Blue = left column team win; Yellow = draw; Red = top row team win.

==== Round 1 Pool I ====
Pos	Fencer	W	L	TF	TA	Notes	AG	MD	EA	GB	MR	MBJ
1	Aladár Gerevich (HUN)	5	0	25	12	Q		5–2	5–4	5–3	5–2	5–1
2	Michael D'Asaro, Sr. (USA)	4	1	22	15	Q	2–5		5–4	5–3	5–0	5–3
3	Emeric Arus (ROU)	3	2	23	16	Q	4–5	4–5		5–2	5–3	5–1
4	Gustave Ballister (BEL)	2	3	18	18		3–5	3–5	2–5		5–3	5–0
5	Michael Ron (ISR)	1	4	13	22		2–5	0–5	3–5	3–5		5–2
6	Mohamed Ben Joullon (MAR)	0	5	7	25		1–5	3–5	1–5	0–5	2–5	

Source: Official Report, p. 821
Legend: Blue = left column team win; Yellow = draw; Red = top row team win.

==== Round 1 Pool J ====
Schwende of Canada was entered in this pool but did not start.

Pos	Fencer	W	L	TF	TA	Notes	RK	HR	MVDA	JR	KH
1	Rudolf Kárpáti (HUN)	4	0	20	7	Q		5–3	5–1	5–2	5–1
2	Helmuth Resch (AUT)	2	2	17	11	B	3–5		4–5	5–1	5–0
2	Marcel Van Der Auwera (BEL)	2	2	14	18	B	1–5	5–4		3–5	5–4
2	Joaquim Rodrigues (POR)	2	2	13	17	B	2–5	1–5	5–3		5–4
5	Keith Hackshall (AUS)	0	4	9	20		1–5	0–5	4–5	4–5	

Source: Official Report, p. 821
Legend: Blue = left column team win; Yellow = draw; Red = top row team win.

Barrage

Pos	Fencer	W	L	TF	TA	Notes	HR	MVDA	JR
2	Helmuth Resch (AUT)	2	0	10	4	Q		5–3	5–1
3	Marcel Van Der Auwera (BEL)	1	1	8	6	Q	3–5		5–1
4	Joaquim Rodrigues (POR)	0	2	2	10		1–5	1–5	

Source: Official Report, p. 821
Legend: Blue = left column team win; Yellow = draw; Red = top row team win.

==== Round 1 Pool K ====
Pos	Fencer	W	L	TF	TA	Notes	WZ	JP	PC	JH	MA	BP
1	Wojciech Zabłocki (POL)	5	0	25	7	Q		5–2	5–2	5–0	5–3	5–0
2	Juan Paladino (URU)	3	2	21	20	Q	2–5		5–3	4–5	5–4	5–3
3	Pierluigi Chicca (ITA)	3	2	20	18	Q	2–5	3–5		5–1	5–3	5–4
4	Jushar Haschja (INA)	2	3	12	23		0–5	5–4	1–5		1–5	5–4
5	Michael Amberg (GBR)	1	3	15	16		3–5	4–5	3–5	5–1		
6	Brian Pickworth (NZL)	0	4	11	20		0–5	3–5	4–5	4–5		

Source: Official Report, p. 821
Legend: Blue = left column team win; Yellow = draw; Red = top row team win.

==== Round 1 Pool L ====
Pos	Fencer	W	L	TF	TA	Notes	AK	TG	JL	MF	TVX	DvG
1	Allan Kwartler (USA)	4	1	24	11	Q		4–5	5–3	5–1	5–1	5–1
2	Teodoro Goliardi (URU)	4	1	22	14	Q	5–4		2–5	5–4	5–1	5–0
3	Jacques Lefèvre (FRA)	3	2	22	15	B	3–5	5–2		4–5	5–2	5–1
3	Mitsuyuki Funamizu (JPN)	3	2	20	18	B	1–5	4–5	5–4		5–4	5–0
5	Trần Văn Xuan (VIE)	1	4	13	20		1–5	1–5	2–5	4–5		5–0
6	David van Gelder (ISR)	0	5	2	25		1–5	0–5	1–5	0–5	0–5	

Source: Official Report, p. 822
Legend: Blue = left column team win; Yellow = draw; Red = top row team win.

Barrage

Pos	Fencer	W	L	TF	TA	Notes	JL	MF
3	Jacques Lefèvre (FRA)	1	0	5	3	Q		5–3
4	Mitsuyuki Funamizu (JPN)	0	1	3	5		3–5	

Source: Official Report, p. 822
Legend: Blue = left column team win; Yellow = draw; Red = top row team win.

=== Round 2 ===
==== Round 2 Pool A ====
Pos	Fencer	W	L	TF	TA	Notes	CA	ZH	MD	LR	JP	GU
1	Claude Arabo (FRA)	4	1	22	9	Q		2–5	5–2	5–1	5–1	5–0
2	Zoltán Horváth (HUN)	4	1	22	11	Q	5–2		2–5	5–2	5–1	5–1
3	Michael D'Asaro, Sr. (USA)	4	1	22	13	Q	2–5	5–2		5–2	5–3	5–1
4	Ladislau Rohony (ROU)	2	3	15	22	Q	1–5	2–5	2–5		5–3	5–4
5	Juan Paladino (URU)	1	4	13	24		1–5	1–5	3–5	3–5		5–4
6	Günther Ulrich (AUT)	0	5	10	25		0–5	1–5	1–5	4–5	4–5	

Source: Official Report, p. 823
Legend: Blue = left column team win; Yellow = draw; Red = top row team win.

==== Round 2 Pool B ====
Pos	Fencer	W	L	TF	TA	Notes	AG	WC	JR	AM	JVB	BS
1	Aladár Gerevich (HUN)	3	1	19	13	Q		4–5	5–3		5–1	5–4
2	Wladimiro Calarese (ITA)	3	1	18	13	Q	5–4			3–5	5–1	5–3
3	Jacques Roulot (FRA)	3	1	18	14	Q	3–5			5–2	5–3	5–4
4	Alfonso Morales (USA)	2	2	14	13	Q		5–3	2–5		5–0	2–5
5	José Van Baelen (BEL)	1	4	10	22		1–5	1–5	3–5	0–5		5–2
6	Boris Stavrev (BUL)	1	4	18	22		4–5	3–5	4–5	5–2	2–5	

Source: Official Report, p. 823
Legend: Blue = left column team win; Yellow = draw; Red = top row team win.

==== Round 2 Pool C ====
Pos	Fencer	W	L	TF	TA	Notes	WZ	YR	WK	AD	HR	EA
1	Wojciech Zabłocki (POL)	3	1	19	12	Q			5–2	4–5	5–2	5–3
2	Yakov Rylsky (URS)	3	0	15	8	Q			5–3	5–3		5–2
3	Walter Köstner (EUA)	3	2	20	18	Q	2–5	3–5		5–4	5–0	5–4
4	Asen Dyakovski (BUL)	2	3	21	21	Q	5–4	3–5	4–5		5–2	4–5
5	Helmuth Resch (AUT)	1	3	9	16		2–5		0–5	2–5		5–1
6	Emeric Arus (ROU)	1	4	15	24		3–5	2–5	4–5	5–4	1–5	

Source: Official Report, p. 823
Legend: Blue = left column team win; Yellow = draw; Red = top row team win.

==== Round 2 Pool D ====
Pos	Fencer	W	L	TF	TA	Notes	JL	JP	JT	NA	AV	DM
1	Jacques Lefèvre (FRA)	4	1	22	14	Q		5–4	5–1	2–5	5–3	5–1
2	Jerzy Pawłowski (POL)	4	1	24	11	Q	4–5		5–2	5–0	5–1	5–3
3	Jürgen Theuerkauff (EUA)	3	2	18	20	Q	1–5	2–5		5–4	5–4	5–2
4	Nugzar Asatiani (URS)	2	3	17	19	Q	5–2	0–5	4–5		5–2	3–5
5	Aleksandar Vasin (YUG)	1	4	15	23		3–5	1–5	4–5	2–5		5–3
6	Dumitru Mustață (ROU)	1	4	14	23		1–5	3–5	2–5	5–3	3–5	

Source: Official Report, p. 824
Legend: Blue = left column team win; Yellow = draw; Red = top row team win.

==== Round 2 Pool E ====
Pos	Fencer	W	L	TF	TA	Notes	RK	RF	TG	WW	DS	SL
1	Rudolf Kárpáti (HUN)	4	1	24	9	Q		5–3	5–0	4–5	5–1	5–0
2	Roberto Ferrari (ITA)	3	1	18	13	Q	3–5			5–1	5–3	5–4
3	Teodoro Goliardi (URU)	3	1	15	15	Q	0–5			5–4	5–3	5–3
4	Wilfried Wöhler (EUA)	2	3	16	22	Q	5–4	1–5	4–5		5–3	1–5
5	Daniel Sande (ARG)	1	4	15	23		1–5	3–5	3–5	3–5		5–3
6	Sandy Leckie (GBR)	1	4	15	21		0–5	4–5	3–5	5–1	3–5	

Source: Official Report, p. 824
Legend: Blue = left column team win; Yellow = draw; Red = top row team win.

==== Round 2 Pool F ====
Pos	Fencer	W	L	TF	TA	Notes	RZ	DT	AK	MVDA	PC	JW
1	Ryszard Zub (POL)	4	1	24	16	Q		5–2	4–5	5–3	5–3	5–3
2	David Tyshler (URS)	3	2	20	16	Q	2–5		5–1	5–2	3–5	5–3
3	Allan Kwartler (USA)	3	2	19	22	Q	5–4	1–5		3–5	5–4	5–4
4	Marcel Van Der Auwera (BEL)	2	3	19	21	B	3–5	2–5	5–3		4–5	5–3
4	Pierluigi Chicca (ITA)	2	3	20	22	B	3–5	5–3	4–5	5–4		3–5
6	Josef Wanetschek (AUT)	1	4	18	23		3–5	3–5	4–5	3–5	5–3	

Source: Official Report, p. 824
Legend: Blue = left column team win; Yellow = draw; Red = top row team win.

Barrage

Pos	Fencer	W	L	TF	TA	Notes	MVDA	PC
4	Marcel Van Der Auwera (BEL)	1	0	5	3	Q		5–3
5	Pierluigi Chicca (ITA)	0	1	3	5		3–5	

Source: Official Report, p. 824
Legend: Blue = left column team win; Yellow = draw; Red = top row team win.

=== Quarterfinals ===
==== Quarterfinal A ====
Pos	Fencer	W	L	TF	TA	Notes	CA	JP	DT	AD	JT	AK
1	Claude Arabo (FRA)	4	1	21	12	Q		1–5	5–4	5–2	5–1	5–0
2	Jerzy Pawłowski (POL)	4	1	21	14	Q	5–1		1–5	5–3	5–2	5–3
3	David Tyshler (URS)	4	1	24	13	Q	4–5	5–1		5–4	5–3	5–0
4	Asen Dyakovski (BUL)	2	3	19	15		2–5	3–5	4–5		5–0	5–0
5	Jürgen Theuerkauff (EUA)	0	4	6	20		1–5	2–5	3–5	0–5		
6	Allan Kwartler (USA)	0	4	3	20		0–5	3–5	0–5	0–5		

Source: Official Report, p. 825
Legend: Blue = left column team win; Yellow = draw; Red = top row team win.

==== Quarterfinal B ====
Pos	Fencer	W	L	TF	TA	Notes	YR	RF	ZH	RZ	MVDA	AM
1	Yakov Rylsky (URS)	4	1	24	10	Q		5–1	5–1	4–5	5–1	5–2
2	Roberto Ferrari (ITA)	4	1	21	16	Q	1–5		5–4	5–2	5–2	5–3
3	Zoltán Horváth (HUN)	3	2	20	15	Q	1–5	4–5		5–1	5–2	5–2
4	Ryszard Zub (POL)	2	3	17	22		5–4	2–5	1–5		4–5	5–3
5	Marcel Van Der Auwera (BEL)	2	3	15	22		1–5	2–5	2–5	5–4		5–3
6	Alfonso Morales (USA)	0	5	13	25		2–5	3–5	2–5	3–5	3–5	

Source: Official Report, p. 825
Legend: Blue = left column team win; Yellow = draw; Red = top row team win.

==== Quarterfinal C ====
Pos	Fencer	W	L	TF	TA	Notes	WZ	AG	JR	TG	NA	WK
1	Wojciech Zabłocki (POL)	4	1	23	14	Q		3–5	5–1	5–2	5–3	5–3
2	Aladár Gerevich (HUN)	3	2	22	15	Q	5–3		4–5	5–0	3–5	5–2
3	Jacques Roulot (FRA)	3	2	20	21	Q	1–5	5–4		5–3	4–5	5–4
4	Teodoro Goliardi (URU)	2	3	15	18		2–5	0–5	3–5		5–2	5–1
5	Nugzar Asatiani (URS)	2	3	18	22		3–5	5–3	5–4	2–5		3–5
6	Walter Köstner (EUA)	1	4	15	23		3–5	2–5	4–5	1–5	5–3	

Source: Official Report, p. 825
Legend: Blue = left column team win; Yellow = draw; Red = top row team win.

==== Quarterfinal D ====
Pos	Fencer	W	L	TF	TA	Notes	RK	LR	WC	JL	MD	WW
1	Rudolf Kárpáti (HUN)	4	1	22	14	Q		2–5	5–1	5–4	5–1	5–3
2	Ladislau Rohony (ROU)	3	2	21	18	Q	5–2		4–5	2–5	5–3	5–3
3	Wladimiro Calarese (ITA)	3	2	19	21	Q	1–5	5–4		5–4	5–3	3–5
4	Jacques Lefèvre (FRA)	2	3	21	19		4–5	5–2	4–5		3–5	5–2
5	Michael D'Asaro, Sr. (USA)	1	3	12	18		1–5	3–5	3–5	5–3		
6	Wilfried Wöhler (EUA)	1	3	13	18		3–5	3–5	5–3	2–5		

Source: Official Report, p. 826
Legend: Blue = left column team win; Yellow = draw; Red = top row team win.

=== Semifinals ===
==== Semifinal A ====
Pos	Fencer	W	L	TF	TA	Notes	RK	CA	DT	WZ	RF	LR
1	Rudolf Kárpáti (HUN)	4	1	23	17	Q		3–5	5–4	5–4	5–3	5–1
2	Claude Arabo (FRA)	3	2	22	17	Q	5–3		5–2	5–2	3–5	4–5
3	David Tyshler (URS)	3	2	21	19	Q	4–5	2–5		5–3	5–4	5–2
4	Wojciech Zabłocki (POL)	2	3	19	22	B	4–5	2–5	3–5		5–4	5–3
4	Roberto Ferrari (ITA)	2	3	21	22	B	3–5	5–3	4–5	4–5		5–4
6	Ladislau Rohony (ROU)	1	4	15	24		1–5	5–4	2–5	3–5	4–5	

Source: Official Report, p. 827
Legend: Blue = left column team win; Yellow = draw; Red = top row team win.

Barrage

Pos	Fencer	W	L	TF	TA	Notes	WZ	RF
4	Wojciech Zabłocki (POL)	1	0	5	4	Q		5–4
5	Roberto Ferrari (ITA)	0	1	4	5		4–5	

Source: Official Report, p. 827
Legend: Blue = left column team win; Yellow = draw; Red = top row team win.

==== Semifinal B ====
Pos	Fencer	W	L	TF	TA	Notes	JP	ZH	WC	YR	AG	JR
1	Jerzy Pawłowski (POL)	4	1	24	15	Q		5–3	5–1	5–4	4–5	5–2
2	Zoltán Horváth (HUN)	4	1	23	18	Q	3–5		5–4	5–3	5–4	5–2
3	Wladimiro Calarese (ITA)	2	3	18	22	B	1–5	4–5		5–3	5–4	3–5
3	Yakov Rylsky (URS)	2	3	20	19	B	4–5	3–5	3–5		5–3	5–1
3	Aladár Gerevich (HUN)	2	3	21	22	B	5–4	4–5	4–5	3–5		5–3
6	Jacques Roulot (FRA)	1	4	13	23		2–5	2–5	5–3	1–5	3–5	

Source: Official Report, p. 827
Legend: Blue = left column team win; Yellow = draw; Red = top row team win.

Barrage

Pos	Fencer	W	L	TF	TA	Notes	WC	YR	AG
3	Wladimiro Calarese (ITA)	1	1	8	6	Q		3–5	5–1
4	Yakov Rylsky (URS)	1	1	8	8	Q	5–3		3–5
5	Aladár Gerevich (HUN)	1	1	6	8		1–5	5–3	

Source: Official Report, p. 827
Legend: Blue = left column team win; Yellow = draw; Red = top row team win.

=== Final ===
A four-way tie for second place required a barrage to determine the silver and bronze medals (as well as 4th and 5th place). The tie for 7th and 8th place was broken based on touches received.

Pos	Fencer	W	L	TF	TA	Notes	RK	ZH	WC	CA	WZ	JP	DT	YR
1st place, gold medalist(s)	Rudolf Kárpáti (HUN)	5	2	31	25			5–4	3–5	5–4	5–0	5–4	5–3	3–5
2	Zoltán Horváth (HUN)	4	3	29	26	B	4–5		5–3	5–3	2–5	3–5	5–3	5–2
2	Wladimiro Calarese (ITA)	4	3	31	29	B	5–3	3–5		5–4	4–5	5–3	5–4	4–5
2	Claude Arabo (FRA)	4	3	31	29	B	4–5	3–5	4–5		5–4	5–3	5–3	5–4
2	Wojciech Zabłocki (POL)	4	3	26	26	B	0–5	5–2	5–4	3–5		3–5	5–1	5–4
6	Jerzy Pawłowski (POL)	3	4	28	28		4–5	5–3	3–5	3–5	5–3		3–5	5–2
7	David Tyshler (URS)	2	5	24	29		3–5	3–5	4–5	3–5	1–5	5–3		5–1
8	Yakov Rylsky (URS)	2	5	23	32		5–3	2–5	5–4	4–5	4–5	2–5	1–5	

Source: Official Report, p. 829
Legend: Blue = left column team win; Yellow = draw; Red = top row team win.

Barrage

Pos	Fencer	W	L	TF	TA	ZH	WC	CA	WZ
2nd place, silver medalist(s)	Zoltán Horváth (HUN)	2	1	14	8		4–5	5–2	5–1
3rd place, bronze medalist(s)	Wladimiro Calarese (ITA)	2	1	13	12	5–4		3–5	5–3
4	Claude Arabo (FRA)	2	1	11	12	1–5	5–3		5–4
5	Wojciech Zabłocki (POL)	0	3	9	15	2–5	3–5	4–5	

Source: Official Report, p. 829
Legend: Blue = left column team win; Yellow = draw; Red = top row team win.

== Overall standings ==
Rank	Fencer	Nation	Round 1	Round 2	Quarterfinals	Semifinals	Final
1st place, gold medalist(s)	Rudolf Kárpáti	Hungary	1	1	1	1	1
2nd place, silver medalist(s)	Zoltán Horváth	Hungary	1	2	3	2	2
3rd place, bronze medalist(s)	Wladimiro Calarese	Italy	1	2	3	3	3
4	Claude Arabo	France	1	1	1	2	4
5	Wojciech Zabłocki	Poland	1	1	1	4	5
6	Jerzy Pawłowski	Poland	1	2	2	1	6
7	David Tyshler	Soviet Union	1	2	3	3	7
8	Yakov Rylsky	Soviet Union	1	2	1	4	8
9	Roberto Ferrari	Italy	1	2	2	5	Did not advance
9	Aladár Gerevich	Hungary	1	1	2	5	Did not advance
11	Ladislau Rohony	Romania	2	4	2	6	Did not advance
11	Jacques Roulot	France	2	3	3	6	Did not advance
13	Asen Dyakovski	Bulgaria	3	4	4	did not advance	
13	Ryszard Zub	Poland	2	1	4	did not advance	
13	Teodoro Goliardi	Uruguay	2	3	4	did not advance	
13	Jacques Lefèvre	France	3	1	4	did not advance	
17	Jürgen Theuerkauff	United Team of Germany	1	3	5	did not advance	
17	Marcel Van Der Auwera	Belgium	3	4	5	did not advance	
17	Nugzar Asatiani	Soviet Union	2	4	5	did not advance	
17	Michael D'Asaro, Sr.	United States	2	3	5	did not advance	
21	Allan Kwartler	United States	1	3	6	did not advance	
21	Alfonso Morales	United States	3	4	6	did not advance	
21	Walter Köstner	United Team of Germany	2	3	6	did not advance	
21	Wilfried Wöhler	United Team of Germany	2	4	6	did not advance	
25	Juan Paladino	Uruguay	2	5	did not advance		
25	José Van Baelen	Belgium	2	5	did not advance		
25	Helmuth Resch	Austria	2	5	did not advance		
25	Aleksandar Vasin	Yugoslavia	3	5	did not advance		
25	Daniel Sande	Argentina	3	5	did not advance		
25	Pierluigi Chicca	Italy	3	5	did not advance		
31	Günther Ulrich	Austria	3	6	did not advance		
31	Boris Stavrev	Bulgaria	3	6	did not advance		
31	Emeric Arus	Romania	3	6	did not advance		
31	Dumitru Mustață	Romania	2	6	did not advance		
31	Sandy Leckie	Great Britain	3	6	did not advance		
31	Josef Wanetschek	Austria	3	6	did not advance		
37	Augusto Gutiérrez	Venezuela	4	did not advance			
37	Michael Sichel	Australia	4	did not advance			
37	Tsugeo Ozawa	Japan	4	did not advance			
37	Benito Ramos	Mexico	4	did not advance			
37	Juan Larrea	Argentina	4	did not advance			
37	Ramón Martínez	Spain	4	did not advance			
37	Gustavo Vassallo	Argentina	4	did not advance			
37	Ralph Cooperman	Great Britain	4	did not advance			
37	Gustave Ballister	Belgium	4	did not advance			
37	Joaquim Rodrigues	Portugal	4	did not advance			
37	Jushar Haschja	Indonesia	4	did not advance			
37	Mitsuyuki Funamizu	Japan	4	did not advance			
49	Orlando Azinhais	Portugal	5	did not advance			
49	Pablo Ordejón	Spain	5	did not advance			
49	Jacques Ben Gualid	Morocco	5	did not advance			
49	César de Diego	Spain	5	did not advance			
49	William Fajardo	Mexico	5	did not advance			
49	Sonosuke Fujimaki	Japan	5	did not advance			
49	Palle Frey	Denmark	5	did not advance			
49	Raoul Barouch	Tunisia	5	did not advance			
49	Michael Ron	Israel	5	did not advance			
49	Keith Hackshall	Australia	5	did not advance			
49	Michael Amberg	Great Britain	5	did not advance			
49	Trần Văn Xuan	Vietnam	5	did not advance			
61	Jean Khayat	Tunisia	6	did not advance			
61	Abderrahman Sebti	Morocco	6	did not advance			
61	Luis García	Venezuela	6	did not advance			
61	Jaime Duque	Colombia	6	did not advance			
61	António Marquilhas	Portugal	6	did not advance			
61	Ali Annabi	Tunisia	6	did not advance			
61	Emilio Echeverry	Colombia	6	did not advance			
61	Mohamed Ben Joullon	Morocco	6	did not advance			
61	Brian Pickworth	New Zealand	6	did not advance			
61	David van Gelder	Israel	6	did not advance			
