= Fencing at the 1960 Summer Olympics – Men's team sabre =

Men's team sabre at the Games of the XVII Olympiad
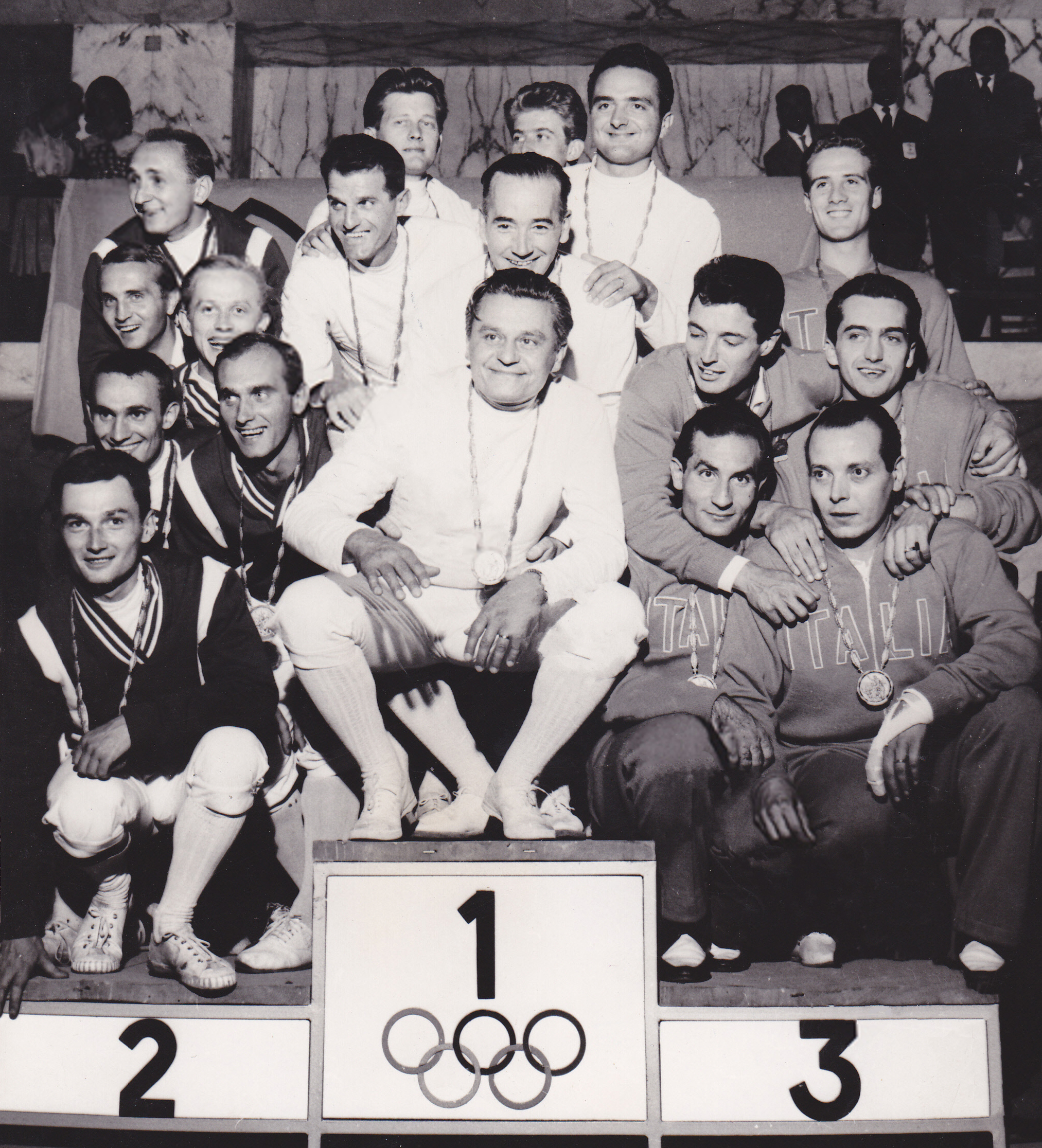
- Venue: Palazzo dei Congressi
- Dates: 10 September
- Competitors: 80 from 16 nations

Medalists
1st place, gold medalist(s)		Aladár Gerevich; Rudolf Kárpáti; Pál Kovács; Zoltán Horváth; Gábor Delneky; Tamás Mendelényi	Hungary
2nd place, silver medalist(s)		Jerzy Pawłowski; Wojciech Zabłocki; Marek Kuszewski; Ryszard Zub; Andrzej Piątkowski; Emil Ochyra	Poland
3rd place, bronze medalist(s)		Wladimiro Calarese; Giampaolo Calanchini; Pierluigi Chicca; Mario Ravagnan; Roberto Ferrari	Italy

The men's team sabre was one of eight fencing events on the fencing at the 1960 Summer Olympics programme. It was the eleventh appearance of the event. The competition was held on 10 September 1960. 80 fencers from 16 nations competed.

== Competition format ==
The competition combined pool play with knockout rounds, a change from prior tournaments which used pool play all the way through. The first round consisted of pools, with the 18 teams entered in the competition divided into 6 pools of 3 teams (2 teams withdrew, so 2 pools had only 2 teams each). The top 2 teams in each pool after a round-robin advanced. The 12 teams remaining after the pool play competed in a four-round single-elimination bracket, with a bronze medal match between the semifinal losers. The winners of the first 4 pools received byes in the round of 16.

Each team match consisted of each of the four fencers on one team facing each fencer on the other team, for a maximum of 16 total bouts. An 8–8 tie would be resolved by touches received in victories. Bouts were to 5 touches. Only as much fencing was done as was necessary to determine pool placement (in the first round) or the winning team (in the knockout rounds), so not all matches went to the full 16 bouts but instead stopped early (typically when one team had 9 bouts won).

== Results ==
=== Elimination ===
Ties between teams were broken by individual victories (in parentheses), then by touches received.

Pool A
1.	Hungary	1-0 (9-3)	Q2
2.	Belgium	0-1 (3-9)	Q2

Pool B
1.	Poland	2-0 (23-5)	Q2
2.	Austria	1-0 (14-14)	Q2
3.	Japan	0-2 (7-25)

Pool C
1.	Soviet Union	1-0 (9-1)	Q2
2.	Argentina	0-1 (1-9)	Q2

Pool D
1.	Italy	2-0 (18-5)	Q2
2.	Romania	1-0 (11-17)	Q2
3.	Portugal	0-2 (10-17)

Pool E
1.	France	2-0 (19-1)	Q2
2.	Great Britain	1-0 (9-16)	Q2
3.	Spain	0-2 (8-19)

Pool F
1.	United States	2-0 (25-6)	Q2
2.	United Team of Germany	1-0 (21-10)	Q2
3.	Morocco	0-2 (1-31)

=== Championship rounds ===
Round Two
France	9
Belgium	5
Romania	9
Great Britain	6
United Team of Germany	9
Argentina	4
United States	9
Austria	5

Quarter-finals
France	7
Italy	9
Romania	3
Hungary	9
United Team of Germany	2
Poland	9
United States	8
Soviet Union	8

Semi-finals
Italy	6
Hungary	9
Poland	9
United States	3

Final
Hungary	9
Poland	7
Third place
Italy	9
United States	6

== Rosters ==
Argentina

- Rafael González
- Juan Larrea
- Daniel Sande
- Gustavo Vassallo

Austria

- Helmuth Resch
- Paul Kerb
- Hans Hocke
- Günther Ulrich
- Josef Wanetschek

Belgium

- José Van Baelen
- Gustave Ballister
- Marcel Van Der Auwera
- François Heywaert
- Roger Petit

France

- Marcel Parent
- Claude Gamot
- Jacques Lefèvre
- Jacques Roulot
- Claude Arabo

Germany

- Dieter Löhr
- Jürgen Theuerkauff
- Wilfried Wöhler
- Peter von Krockow
- Walter Köstner

Great Britain

- Ralph Cooperman
- Michael Amberg
- Sandy Leckie
- Michael Straus
- Donald Stringer

Hungary

- Aladár Gerevich
- Rudolf Kárpáti
- Pál Kovács
- Zoltán Horváth
- Gábor Delneky
- Tamás Mendelényi

Italy

- Wladimiro Calarese
- Giampaolo Calanchini
- Pierluigi Chicca
- Mario Ravagnan
- Roberto Ferrari

Japan

- Sonosuke Fujimaki
- Mitsuyuki Funamizu
- Tsugeo Ozawa
- Kazuhiko Tabuchi

Morocco

- Abderrahman Sebti
- Abderraouf El-Fassy
- Mohamed Ben Joullon
- Jacques Ben Gualid

Poland

- Jerzy Pawłowski
- Wojciech Zabłocki
- Marek Kuszewski
- Ryszard Zub
- Andrzej Piątkowski
- Emil Ochyra

Portugal

- Joaquim Rodrigues
- António Marquilhas
- Orlando Azinhais
- José Ferreira
- José Fernandes

Romania

- Dumitru Mustață
- Cornel Pelmuș
- Ion Santo
- Ladislau Rohony
- Emeric Arus

Soviet Union

- Yevhen Cherepovsky
- Umyar Mavlikhanov
- Nugzar Asatiani
- David Tyshler
- Yakov Rylsky

Spain

- Jesús Díez
- César de Diego
- Pablo Ordejón
- Ramón Martínez

United States

- Allan Kwartler
- George Worth
- Michael D'Asaro, Sr.
- Alfonso Morales
