= Portugal at the 1960 Summer Olympics =

- IOC code: POR
- NOC: Olympic Committee of Portugal

in Rome
- Competitors: 65 (60 men, 5 women) in 11 sports
- Officials: 2
- Medals Ranked 32nd: Gold 0 Silver 1 Bronze 0 Total 1

Summer Olympics appearances (overview)
- 1912; 1920; 1924; 1928; 1932; 1936; 1948; 1952; 1956; 1960; 1964; 1968; 1972; 1976; 1980; 1984; 1988; 1992; 1996; 2000; 2004; 2008; 2012; 2016; 2020; 2024

Portugal competed at the 1960 Summer Olympics in Rome, Italy. A delegation of sixty five competitors participated in a record number of eleven sports, with the Star sailing team winning an Olympic silver medal, the second in Portugal's history.

== Medalists ==
=== Silver ===
- José Quina and Mário Quina — Sailing, Star.

== Athletics ==
Men's 3000m Steeplechase:

- Joaquim Ferreira — 1st round: 11th (heat 1)

Men's 5000m:

- Manuel Oliveira — 1st round: 6th (heat 2)

Men's Decathlon:

- Júlio Santos — DNF (2282 points)
  1. 100m — 12,0 (597)
  2. Long Jump — 6,32 (592)
  3. Shot Put — 10,85 (488)
  4. High Jump — 1,65 (605)
  5. 400m — DNF
  6. 110m Hurdles — DNS
  7. Discus Throw — DNS
  8. Pole Vault — DNS
  9. Javelin Throw — DNS
  10. 1500m — DNS

Men's Hammer Throw:

- Eduardo Martins — qualifiers (54,92)

Men's Long Jump:

- Pedro de Almeida — qualifiers (7,10)

== Cycling ==
Individual road race

- Francisco Valada — 77th - 142nd
- José Pacheco — 77th - 142nd
- Mário Silva — 77th - 142nd
- Ramiro Martins — 77th - 142nd

Team time trial

- Francisco Valada, José Pacheco, Mário Silva and Ramiro Martins — 25th (2:33.19,61)

== Equestrian ==
Men's Individual Dressage:

- António Nogueira — 10th (948 points)
- Luís Mena e Silva — 17th (775 points)

Men's Individual Eventing:

- Álvaro Sabbo — eliminated
- Joaquim Duarte Silva — eliminated
- Jorge Eduardo Mathias — eliminated
- Mário Delgado — 35th (−705,15 points)

Men's Team Eventing:

- Álvaro Sabbo, Joaquim Duarte Silva, Jorge Eduardo Mathias and Mário Delgado — eliminated

Men's Individual Jumping:

- António Pereira de Almeida — eliminated
- Henrique Alves Calado — 11th (32 points)
- Carlos Lopes João — eliminated

Men's Team Jumping:

- António Pereira de Almeida, Carlos Lopes João and Henrique Alves Calado — eliminated

== Fencing ==
Nine fencers, eight men and one woman, represented Portugal in 1960.

Men's foil

- Orlando Azinhais — 1st round: 6th (poule 1)
- Pedro Marçal — 1st round: 7th (poule 2)
- Manuel Borrego

Men's épée

- José Fernandes — eighths-of-final: 6th (poule 4)
- José de Albuquerque — 1st round: 7th (poule 10)
- José Ferreira — eighths-of-final: 5th (poule 1)

Men's team épée

- José Fernandes, José de Albuquerque, José Ferreira and Manuel Borrego — 1st round: 3rd (poule 1)

Men's sabre

- António Marquilhas — 1st round: 6th (poule 6)
- Joaquim Rodrigues — 1st round: 4th (poule 10)
- Orlando Azinhais — 1st round: 5th (poule 1)

Men's team sabre

- António Marquilhas, José Fernandes, Joaquim Rodrigues, José Ferreira, Orlando Azinhais — 1st round: 3rd (poule 4)

Women's foil

- Maria Nápoles — 1st round: 6th (poule 1)

== Gymnastics ==
Men's Individual Competition:

- Hermenegildo Candeias — 120th (87,65 points)
  1. Horizontal Bar — 114th (15,20)
  2. Parallel Bars — 116th (15,30)
  3. Pommelled Horse — 106th (15,65)
  4. Rings — 116th (16,20)
  5. Vault — 129th (8,75)
  6. Floor — 111th (16,55)

Women's Individual Competition:

- Dália Vairinho Cunha Sammer — 109th (59,165)
  1. Vault — 91st (16,166)
  2. Asymmetrical Bars — 115th (12,933)
  3. Beam — 110th (14,566)
  4. Floor — 109th (15,500)
- Esbela Fonseca — 116th (55,431 points)
  1. Vault — 120th (10,733)
  2. Asymmetrical Bars — 115th (12,933)
  3. Beam — 117th (13,766)
  4. Floor — 112th (15,066)
- Maria Cunha — 119th (53,163 points)
  1. Vault — 122nd (9,099)
  2. Asymmetrical Bars — 115th (12,933)
  3. Beam — 113th (14,432)
  4. Floor — 105th (15,766)

== Rowing ==
Portugal had 5 male rowers participate in one out of seven rowing events in 1960.

Men's coxed four

- Ilídio Silva, Jorge Gavinho, José Porto, José Vieira and Rui Valença (cox) — repechage: 3rd (poule 1)

== Sailing ==
Men's Finn:

- Hélder de Oliveira — 15th (3488 points)

Men's Flying Dutchman:

- Carlos Braga and Gabriel da Silva Lopes — 27th (1279 points)

Men's Star:

- José Quina and Mário Quina — 2nd (6665 points)

Men's Dragon:

- Carlos Francisco Ferreira, Gonçalo Mello, Joaquim Pinto Basto — 9th (4051 points)

Men's 5,5m:

- Duarte de Almeida Bello, Fernando Pinto Coelho Bello and Júlio de Sousa Leite Gorinho — 16th (1667 points)

== Shooting ==
Nine shooters represented Portugal in 1960.

25 m pistol

- António Martins — 50th (537 marks)
- Rogério Tavares — 49th (542 marks)

50 m pistol

- André Antunes — 54th (489 marks)
- António Jorge — 36th (522 marks)

50 m rifle, three positions

- António Tavares — 1st round: 29th (group 2)
- Manoel da Silva — 1st round: 32nd (group 1)

50 m rifle, prone

- Albino da Silva — 1st round: 35th (group 2)
- César Batista — 1st round: 30th (group 1) (378 marks)

Trap

- Guy de Valle Flor — 15th (180)

== Swimming ==
Men

Athlete	Event	Heat		Semifinal		Final	
Athlete	Event	Time	Rank	Time	Rank	Time	Rank
Herlander Ribeiro	100 m freestyle	1:00.2	=37	Did not advance			
Eduardo de Sousa	400 m freestyle	4:51.6	32	—N/a		Did not advance	
Eduardo de Sousa	1500 m freestyle	19:40.1	25	—N/a		Did not advance	
Raúl Cerqueira	100 m backstroke	1:06.7	27	Did not advance			
Luís Vaz Jorge	200 m butterfly	2:28.9	23	Did not advance			
Raúl Cerqueira; Eduardo de Sousa; Luís Vaz Jorge; Herlander Ribeiro	4 × 100 m medley	4:39.9	18	—N/a		Did not advance	

Women

Athlete	Event	Heat		Final	
Athlete	Event	Time	Rank	Time	Rank
Regina Veloso	200 m breaststroke	3:13.3	29	Did not advance	

== Weightlifting ==
Men's Bantamweight (–57 kg):

- Luís Paquete — 19th (245 points)

== Wrestling ==
Men's Greco-Roman Bantamweight (–57 kg):

- Orlando Gonçalves — 17th (−6 points)

Men's Greco-Roman Featherweight (–62 kg):

- José Gregório — 22nd (−8 points)

Men's Greco-Roman Middleweight (–79 kg):

- Luis Caldas — 21st (−8 points)

== Officials ==
- Correia Leal (chief of mission)
- Bernardo Mendes de Almeida (sailing)
- Castro de Seixa (women's gymnastics)
