= Romania at the 1960 Summer Olympics =

- IOC code: ROU (ROM used at these Games)
- NOC: Romanian Olympic Committee

in Rome
- Competitors: 98 in 13 sports
- Flag bearer: Alexandru Bizim
- Medals Ranked 11th: Gold 3 Silver 1 Bronze 6 Total 10

Summer Olympics appearances (overview)
- 1900; 1904–1920; 1924; 1928; 1932; 1936; 1948; 1952; 1956; 1960; 1964; 1968; 1972; 1976; 1980; 1984; 1988; 1992; 1996; 2000; 2004; 2008; 2012; 2016; 2020; 2024; 2028

Romania competed at the 1960 Summer Olympics in Rome, Italy. 98 competitors, 82 men and 16 women, took part in 65 events in 13 sports.

== Medalists ==
Medal	Name	Sport	Event	Date
Gold				
Gold				
Gold				
Silver				
Bronze				
Bronze				
Bronze				
Bronze				
Bronze				
Bronze				

Medals by sport
Sport	1st place, gold medalist(s)	2nd place, silver medalist(s)	3rd place, bronze medalist(s)	Total
Athletics				
Boxing				
Canoeing				
Fencing				
Gymnastics				
Shooting				
Wrestling				
Total	3	1	6	10

Medals by gender
Gender	1st place, gold medalist(s)	2nd place, silver medalist(s)	3rd place, bronze medalist(s)	Total
Male				
Female				
Total	3	1	6	10

=== Gold ===
- Iolanda Balaș — Athletics, Women's High Jump
- Ion Dumitrescu — Shooting, Men's Trap
- Dumitru Pârvulescu — Wrestling, Men's Greco-Roman Flyweight

=== Silver ===
- Ion Cernea — Wrestling, Men's Men's Greco-Roman Bantamweight

=== Bronze ===
- Lia Manoliu — Athletics, Women's Discus Throw
- Ion Monea — Boxing, Men's Middleweight (—75 kg)
- Leon Rotman — Canoeing, Men's C-1 1000m
- Maria Vicol — Fencing, Women's Individual Foil
- Atanasia Ionescu, Sonia Iovan, Elena Leușteanu, Emilia Vătășoiu, Elena Niculescu, Uta Poreceanu — Gymnastics, Women's Team All-Around
- Ion Țăranu — Wrestling, Men's Greco-Roman Middleweight

== Cycling ==
Six cyclists, all males, represented Romania in 1960.

Individual road race

- Ion Cosma
- Gheorghe Calcișcă
- Gabriel Moiceanu
- Aurel Șelaru

Team time trial

- Ion Cosma
- Gabriel Moiceanu
- Aurel Șelaru
- Ludovic Zanoni

1000m time trial

- Ion Ioniță

== Fencing ==
15 fencers, 11 men and 4 women, represented Romania in 1960.

Men's foil

- Tănase Mureșanu
- Attila Csipler
- Ion Drîmbă

Men's team foil

- Iosif Szilaghi, Sorin Poenaru, Attila Csipler, Tănase Mureșanu

Men's épée

- Adalbert Gurath, Jr.

Men's sabre

- Ladislau Rohony
- Emeric Arus
- Dumitru Mustață

Men's team sabre

- Dumitru Mustață, Cornel Pelmuș, Ion Santo, Ladislau Rohony, Emeric Arus

Women's foil

- Maria Vicol
- Olga Orban-Szabo
- Ecaterina Orb-Lazăr

Women's team foil

- Ecaterina Orb-Lazăr, Eugenia Mateianu, Olga Orban-Szabo, Maria Vicol

== Rowing ==
Romania had eight male rowers participate in four out of seven rowing events in 1960.

Men

Athlete	Event	Heats		Repechage		Semifinal		Final	
Athlete	Event	Time	Rank	Time	Rank	Time	Rank	Time	Rank
Ștefan Kurecska; Gheorghe Riffelt	Coxless pair	7:35.77	4 R	7:59.67	4	—N/a		—N/a	18
Ștefan Kurecska; Gheorghe Riffelt; Mircea Roger	Coxed pair	7:43.38	1 Q	BYE		—N/a		7:49.57	6
Martin Bielz; Ionel Petrov; Ștefan Pongratz; Iosif Varga	Coxless four	6:43.45	2 R	6:47.04	2	—N/a		—N/a	10
Martin Bielz; Petre Milincovici; Ionel Petrov; Ștefan Pongratz; Mircea Roger	Coxed four	6:47.71	3 R	6:55.63	2 Q	7:10.58	5	—N/a	9

== Shooting ==
Nine shooters represented Romania in 1960. Ion Dumitrescu won the gold medal in the trap event.

25 m pistol

- Ștefan Petrescu
- Gavril Maghiar

50 m pistol

- Gavril Maghiar
- Ilie Nițu

300 m rifle, three positions

- Constantin Antonescu
- Marin Ferecatu

50 m rifle, three positions

- Iosif Sîrbu
- Nicolae Rotaru

50 m rifle, prone

- Iosif Sîrbu
- Nicolae Rotaru

Trap

- Ion Dumitrescu
- Gheorghe Enache

== Swimming ==
Men

Athlete	Event	Heat		Semifinal		Final	
Athlete	Event	Time	Rank	Time	Rank	Time	Rank
Mihai Mitrofan	200 m breaststroke	2:41.8	13 Q	2:41.6	11	Did not advance	
Alexandru Popescu	200 m butterfly	2:24.6	=13 Q	2:28.5	15	Did not advance	
