= Ion Santo =

Ion Santo can refer to:

- Ion Santo (fencer born 1922), a Romanian fencer who competed at the 1952 Summer Olympics
- Ion Santo (fencer born 1940), a Romanian fencer who competed at the 1960 Summer Olympics
