= Juan Larrea =

Juan Larrea may refer to:

- Juan Larrea (poet) (1895–1980), Spanish poet
- Juan Larrea (politician) (1782–1847), Argentine politician
- Juan Larrea (fencer) (born 1935), Argentine fencer
- Juan Larrea (footballer) (born 1993), Argentine footballer
- Juan Ignacio Larrea Holguín (1927–2006), Ecuadorian lawyer
