= Georges Saev =

Bulgarian athlete

- Жорж Саев
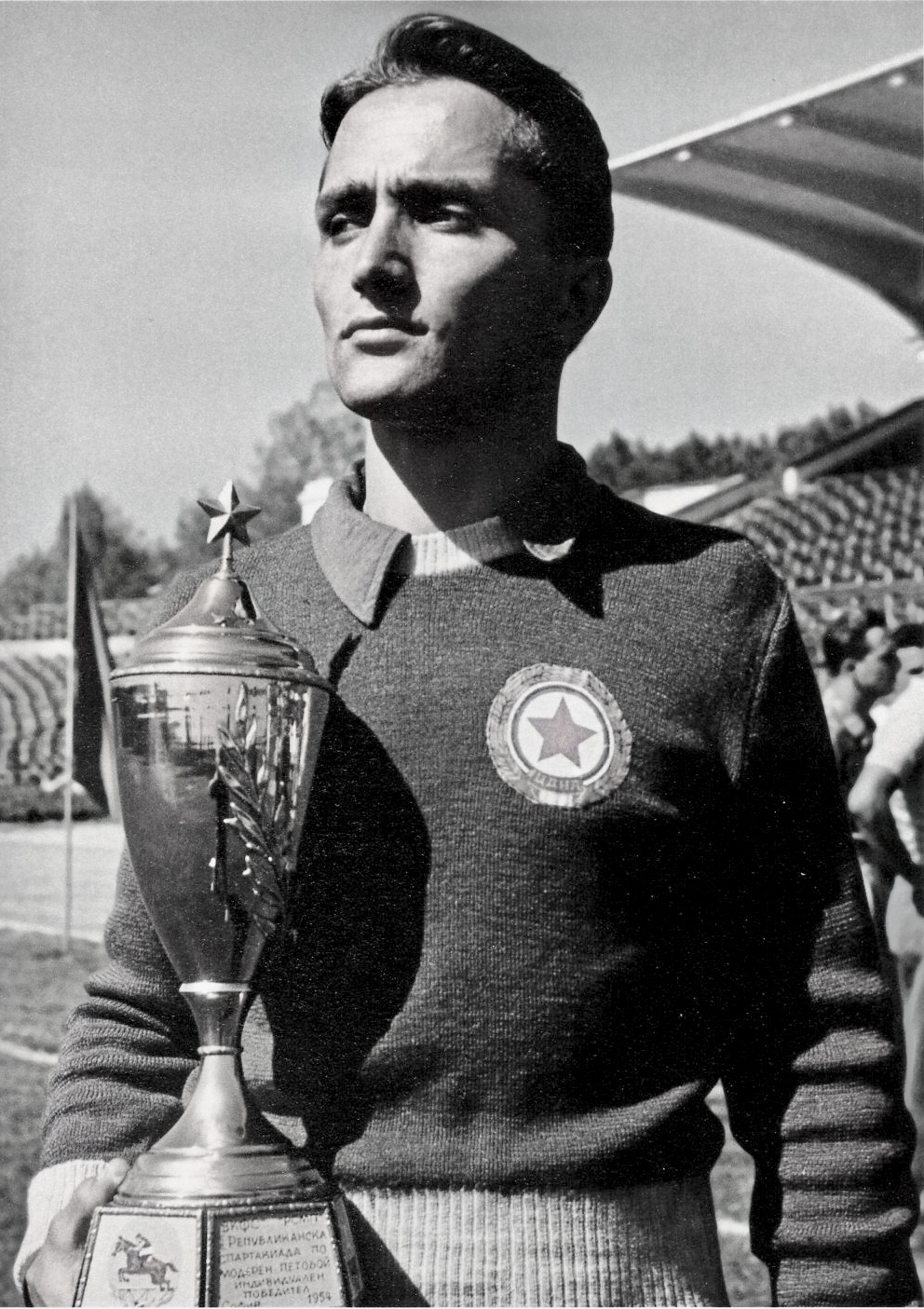
- Saev in 1954
- Born: February 21, 1928; Marseille, France
- Died: April 15, 2020 (aged 92); Chicago, Illinois, U.S.
- Resting place: Wicker Park, Chicago, Illinois, U.S. 41.907860°N 87.677248°W
- Occupations: Translator; fencer; modern pentathlete
- Spouse: Anna Saeva (m. 1931; died 2020)
- Children: 2

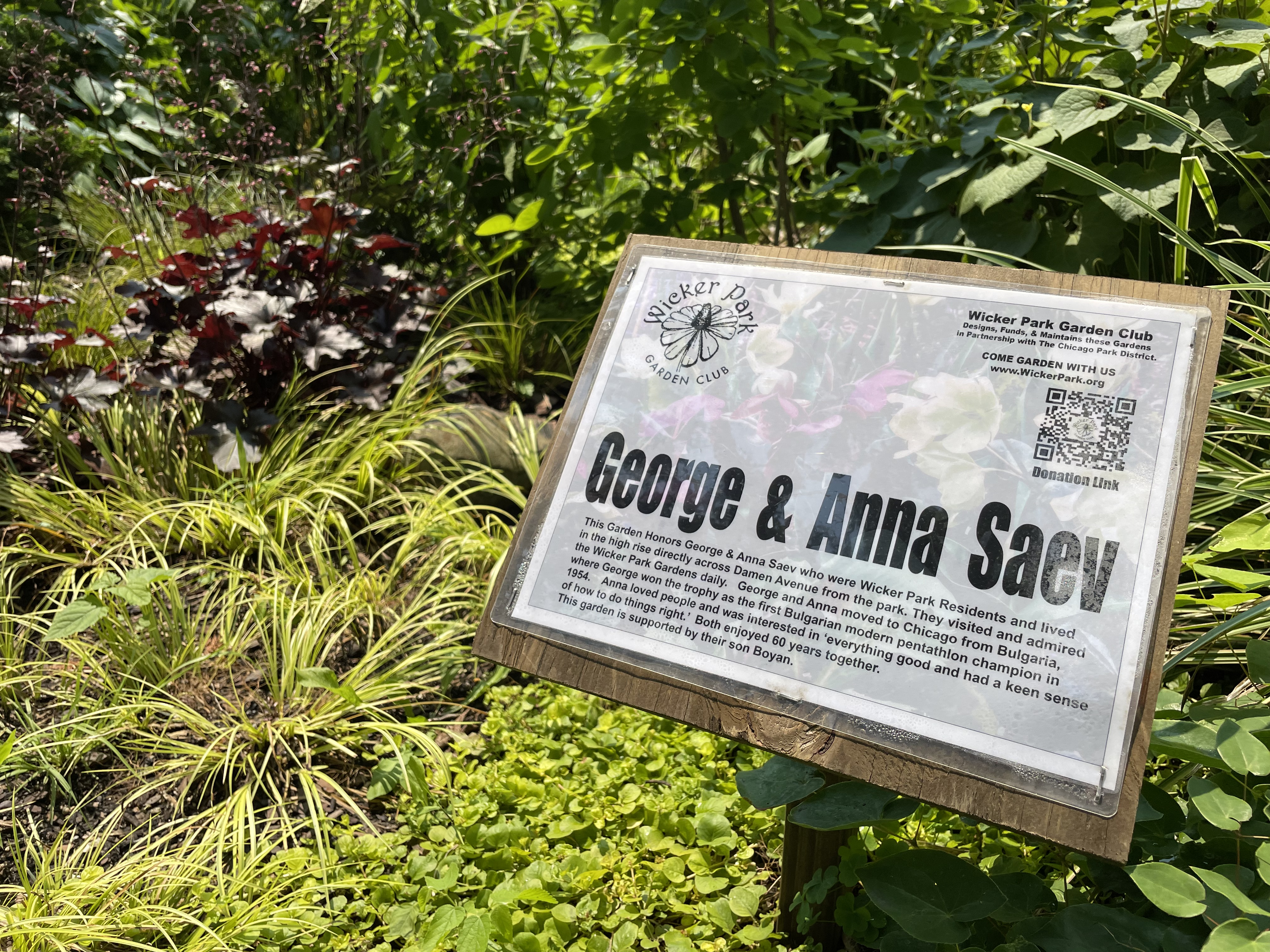
The George & Anna Saev Section of the Wicker Park Gardens in Chicago

Georges Naydenov Saev was a Bulgarian translator and athlete. He became the first Bulgarian champion in Modern Pentathlon (1954) and Fencing.

== Biography ==
Saev was born on February 21, 1928 in Marseille, France, to the family of a Bulgarian diplomat Nayden Saev, then the third secretary at the Bulgarian consulate in the city, and his mother Milka Saeva.

Following his family's return to Bulgaria, he began competing in fencing. On May 1 1950 , in honor of International Worker's Day (Labour Day), the Republican Fencing Section of the Supreme Committee for Physical Culture and Sports (VKFS) held its inaugural competition at the Narodna Voyska (People's Army) Stadium in Sofia. The tournament was officially opened by the chairman of the VKFS, General Vladimir Stoychev. Saev won the men's event with 9 victories. In 1952, he won the country's inaugural national championship in foil.,

First Republican Fencing Championship (Sabre). Vladimir Stoychev presenting the medal to Saev, 5-1-1950-Sofia

Saev also competed in modern pentathlon. At the first Republican championship in modern pentathlon, held from 1 to 5 September 1954 in Sofia, Saev became Bulgaria's first national champion. He became a Republican champion for the second time in 1957.

Saev during the horse draw at the First National Modern Pentathlon Championship, Sept. 1954, Sofia

In 1954, Saev was appointed as fencing and modern pentathlon coach at CSKA (known then as "the Central Sports Club of the Army") and initiated the organized fencing activity at the club. He was a coach in foil, epee and sаbre – men, foil– women and modern pentathlon. During this time, the club began the admission and development of competitive fencers, including prominent athletes and champions such as Asen Dyakovski, Boris Stavrev „Boreto“, Zheko Spiridonov, Nikolay Genov, Hristo „Plyaki“ Genchev, D. Filipov and others. Saev remained at CSKA until 1959, when the section was dissolved and competitive activities paused. His sports trophies, medals, fencing and modern pentathlon attire are preserved on display at the Museum of Sport in Sofia, Bulgaria.

== Professional and personal life ==
Georges Saev and his spouse Anna, with his parents Milka and Nayden on their wedding day, June 18, 1961 Sofia

In addition to his sports career Saev also worked as a translator. He translated Italian and French into Bulgarian and Bulgarian into Italian and French.On June 18, 1961, Saev married Anna in Sofia, and the couple had two sons. Following their retirement they spent their time traveling throughout Europe and the United States, and frequently resided at their family villa in Lukovo, Bulgaria. Records and historic photographs of their family life and his athletic career are preserved in the Saev family archive.Saev died in Chicago on April 15 2020 at the age of 92.

== Gallery ==
Saev competing at the inaugural Bulgarian modern pentathlon championship in Sofia (1954):

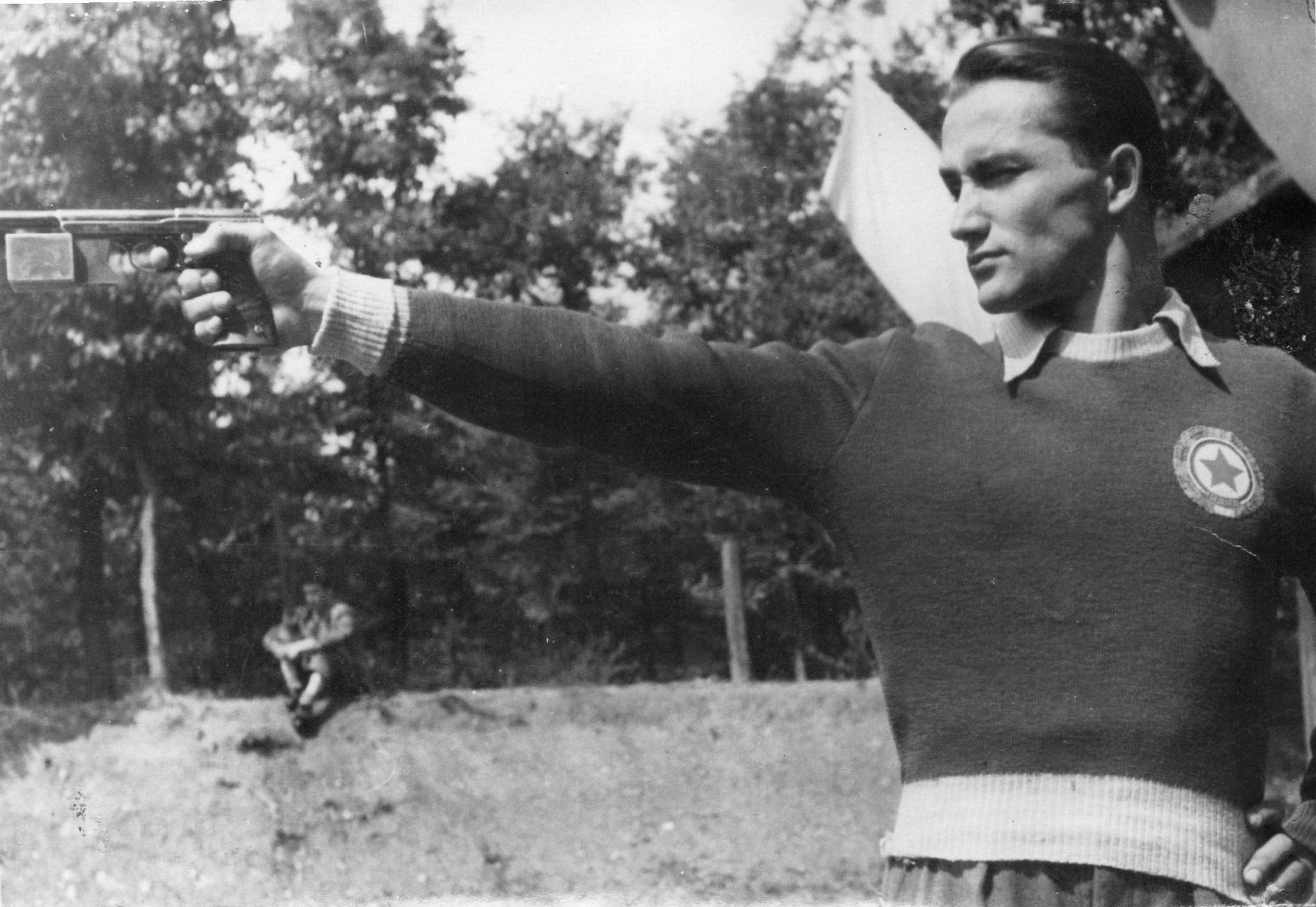
Shooting

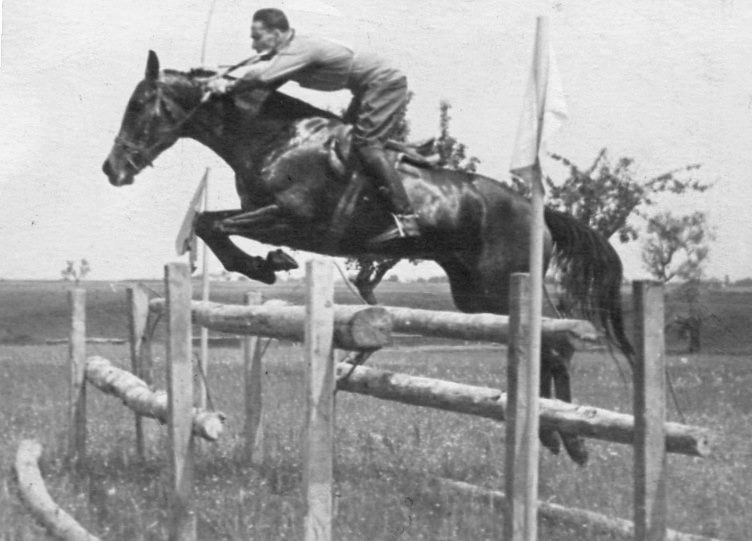
Show jumping (riding the mare Karfitsa)

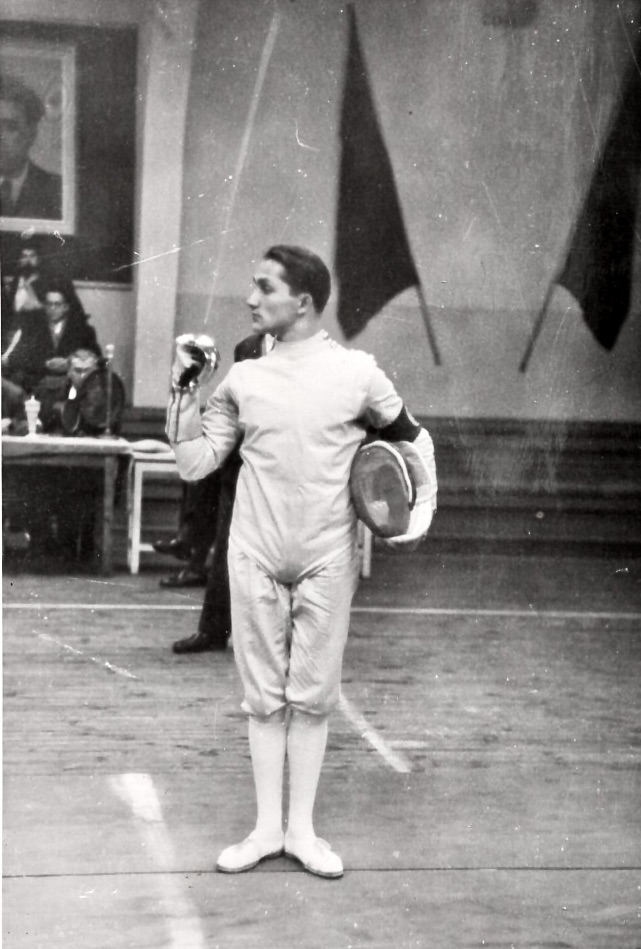
Fencing

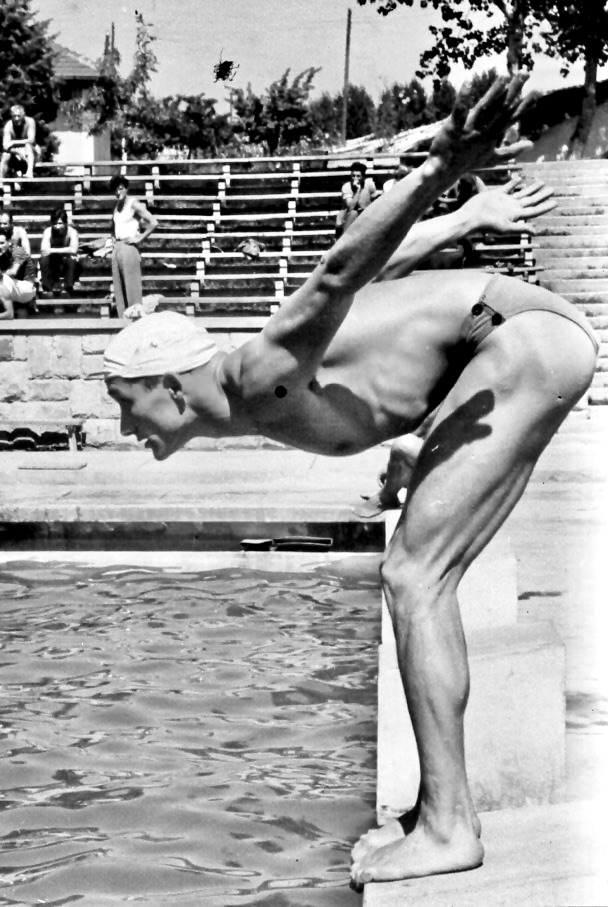
Swimming

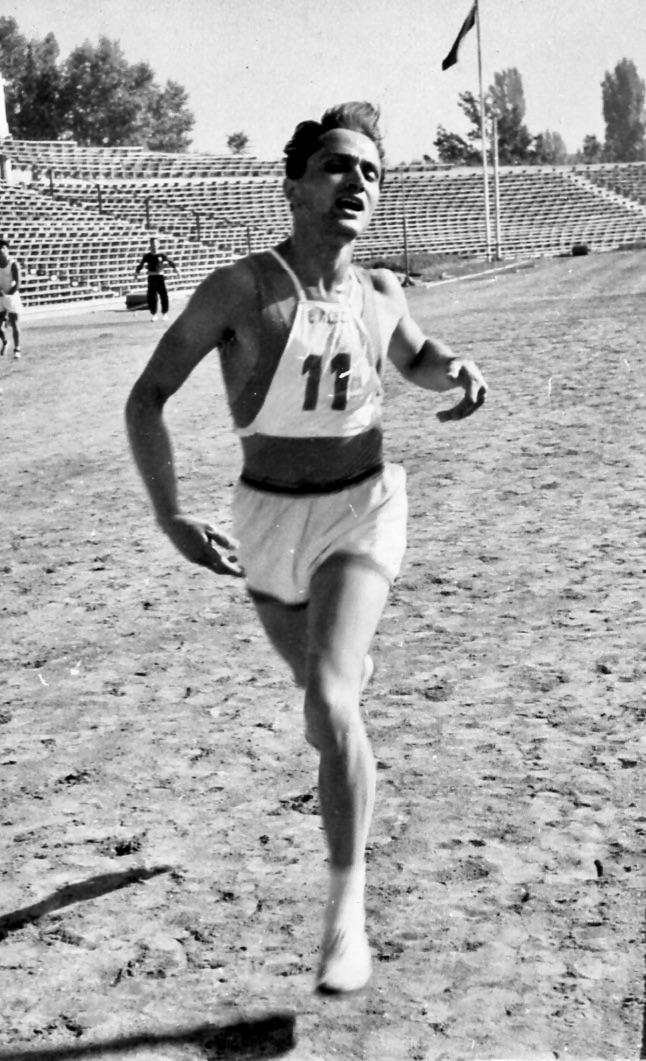
Cross-country running

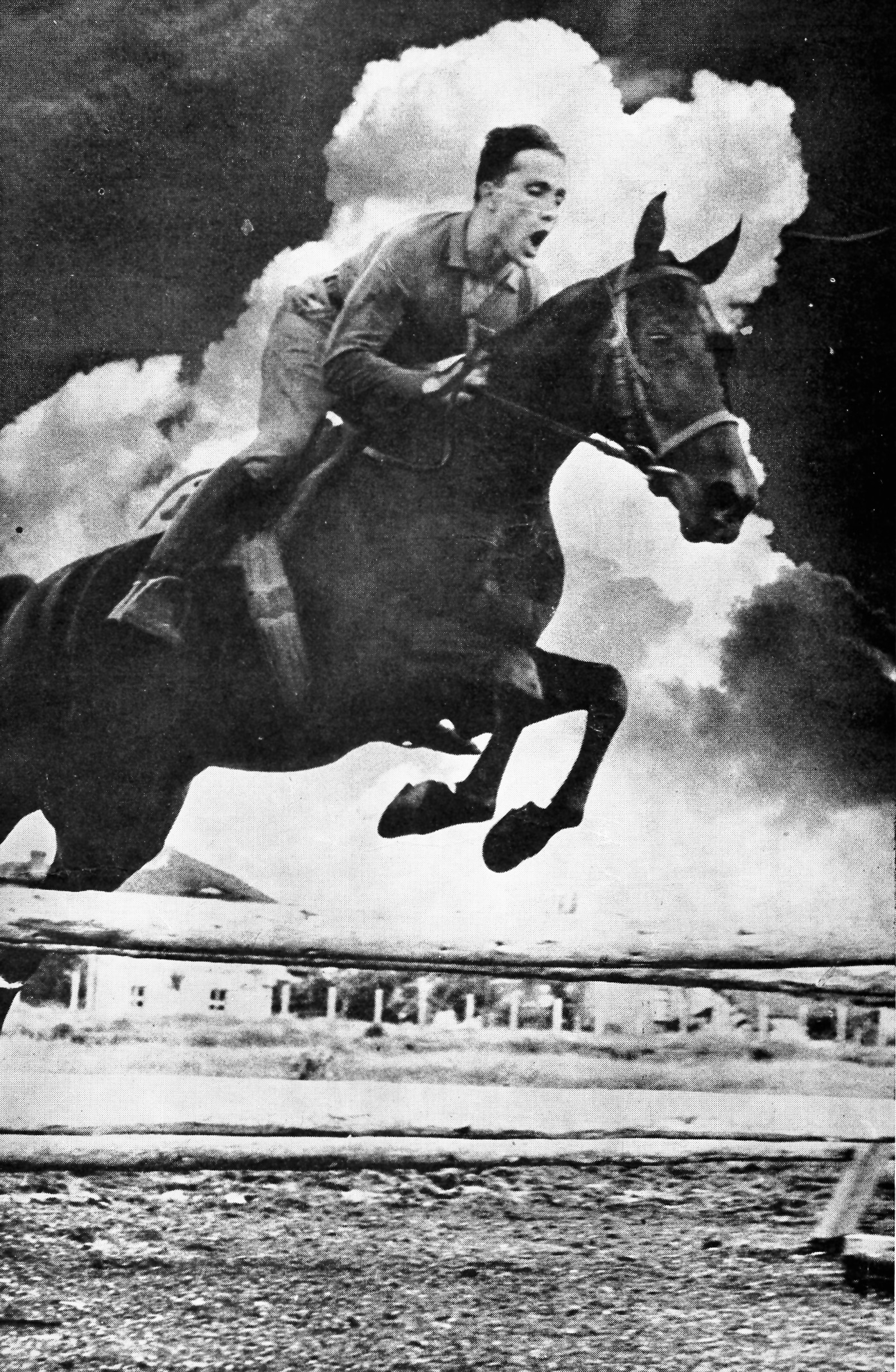
Saev at the 1957 championship
