= Gustavo Vassallo =

Gustavo Vassallo may refer to:

- Gustavo Vassallo (fencer) (1920–2012), Argentine fencer
- Gustavo Vassallo (footballer) (born 1978), Peruvian footballer
