= Ricardo Rimini =

Uruguayan fencer (1908–1972)

Personal information
- Born: 28 January 1908 Rome, Italy
- Died: 9 April 1977 (aged 69)

Sport
- Sport: Fencing

Ricardo Rimini (28 January 1908 – 9 April 1977) was a Uruguayan fencer. He competed in the individual foil event at the 1952 Summer Olympics. He finished second in the 1955 Pan American Games sabre team competition (with Teodoro Goliardi, Juan Paladino, and the non-Olympian José Lardizábal).
