= Nayden Saev =

Bulgarian officer, lawyer, diplomat (1896–1977)

- Born: August 13, 1896; Gorna Dzhumaya, Ottoman Empire
- Died: 1977 (aged 80–81); Sofia, People's Republic of Bulgaria
- Education: National Military University; Sofia University
- Spouse: Milka Gerasimova Saeva
- Children: Georges Saev, Todor Saev
- Parents: Konstantin Saev (father); Varvara Saeva (mother)
- Relatives: Venera Saeva (sister); Svetoslav Saev (brother); Luben Saev (brother); Todor Saev (uncle)
- Awards: Order of Bravery; Knight of the Legion of Honor

Nayden Konstantinov Saev (Bulgarian: Найден Константинов Саев; 13 August 1896 – 1977) was a Bulgarian officer, lawyer and diplomat.

== Early life ==
He was born in 1896 in Gorna Dzhumaya in the family of the revolutionary Father Кonstantin Saev. He graduated from the Military School in Sofia (1914), and later from the Faculty of Law at Sofia University (1923).

== Career ==
From 1915 to 1920 he was an officer on active military duty. He was promoted to Lieutenant on March 12, 1916, and to Senior lieutenant on October 14, 1917. He served in the 63rd Infantry Regiment, which was part of the 11th Macedonian Infantry Division. After completing his law degree, he worked as archive-registrar at the Bulgarian legation in Constantinople (1924–1927).

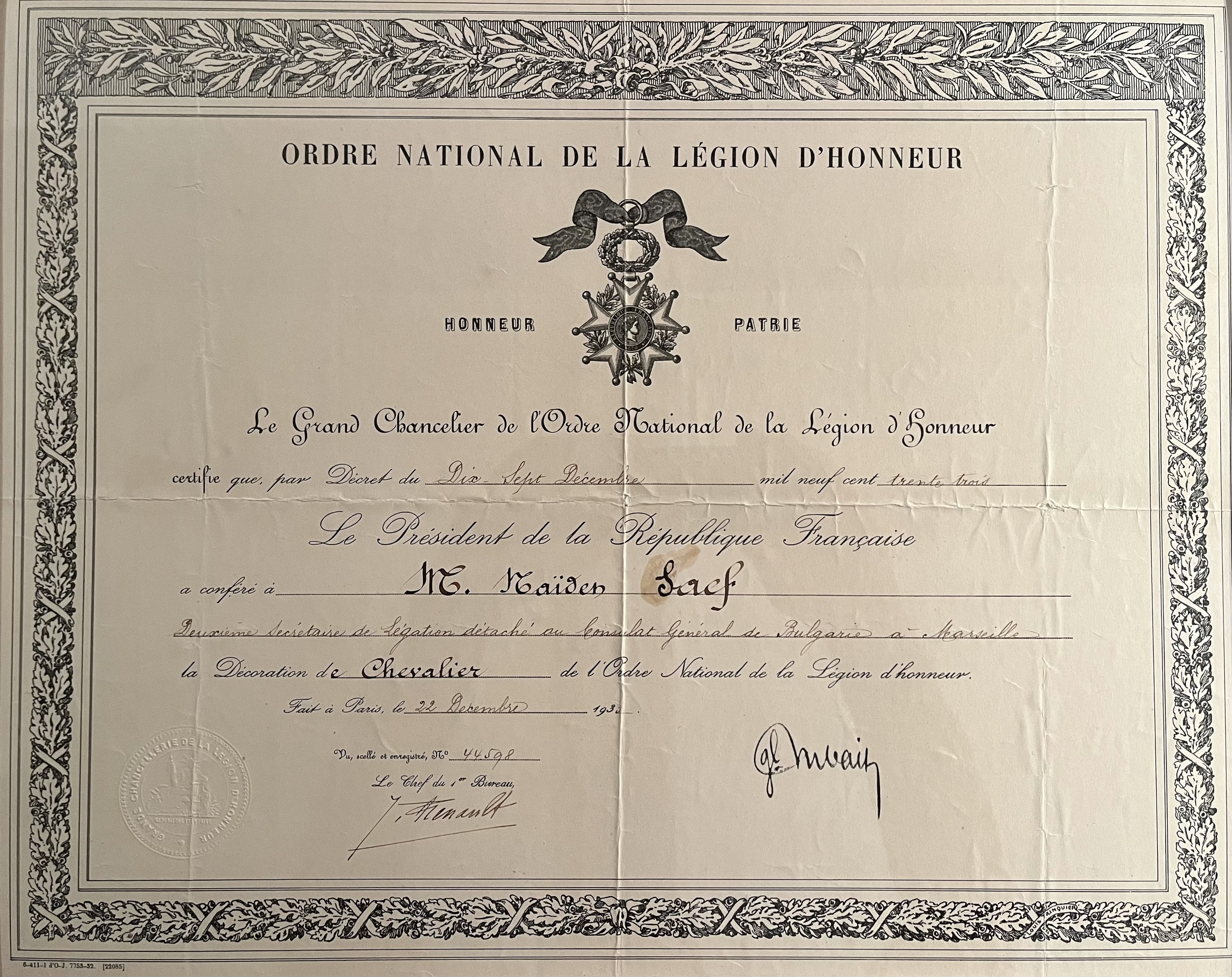
Diploma awarding Nayden Saev with the Legion of Honor, 1933

His diplomatic career began as third secretary at the Bulgarian consulate in Marseille (1928–1932). He served as second and third secretary in the consular - economic department and the cipher department at the Ministry of Foreign Affairs (1932–1935). He worked as second secretary at the consulate in Milan (1935–1936) and legation secretary in Budapest (1939–1943). He was head of the consular department at the Ministry of Foreign Affairs (1944–1950), he also worked at the TPK "Uspeh".

He authored articles and economic research.

He had two sons: Georges Saev (translator, the first Republican champion for Modern pentathlon in Bulgaria in 1954) and Todor Saev.

He died in 1977 in Sofia.

== Recognition ==
- Order of Bravery
- Knight of the Legion of Honor (1933)
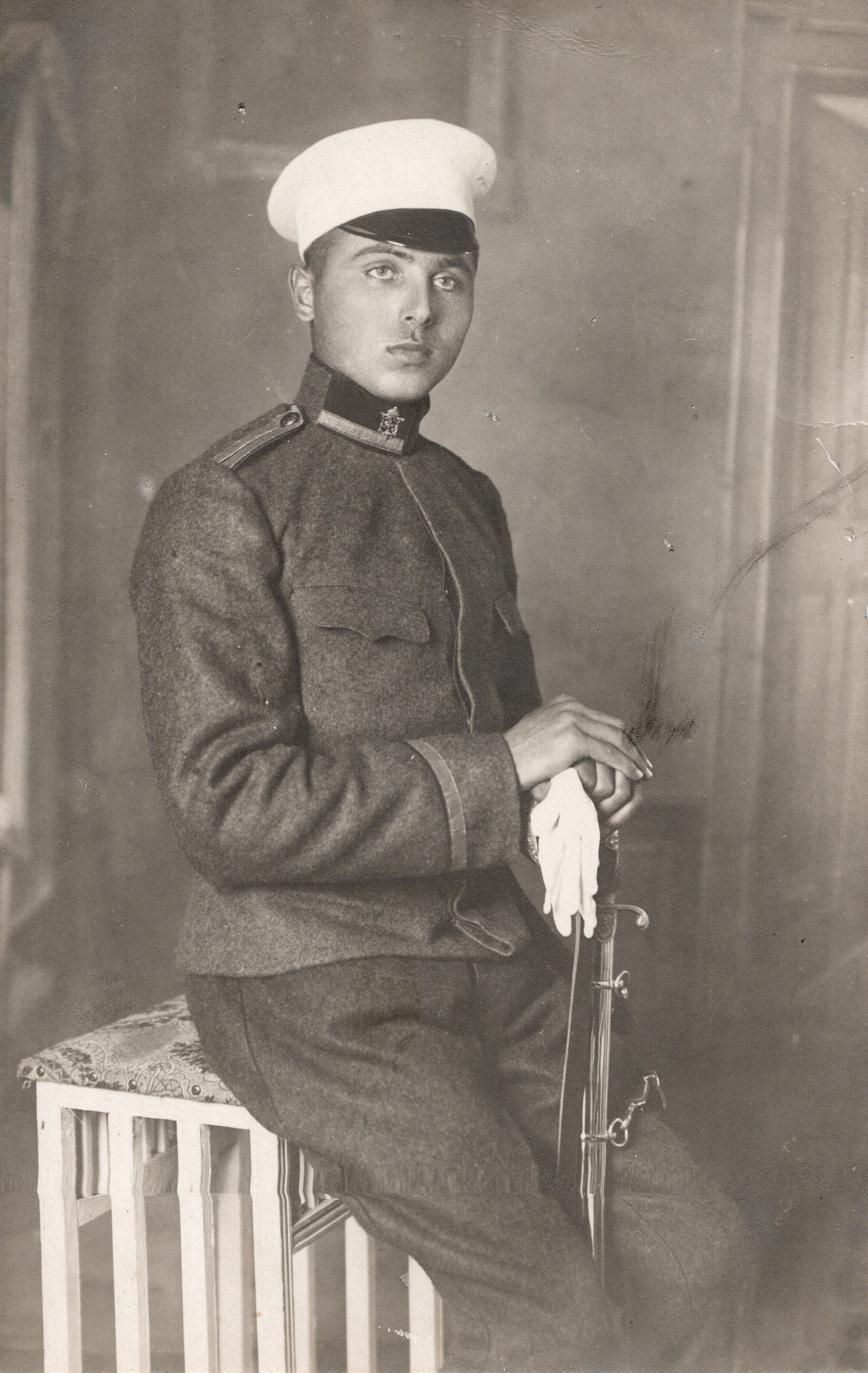
Military School, Sofia-1914

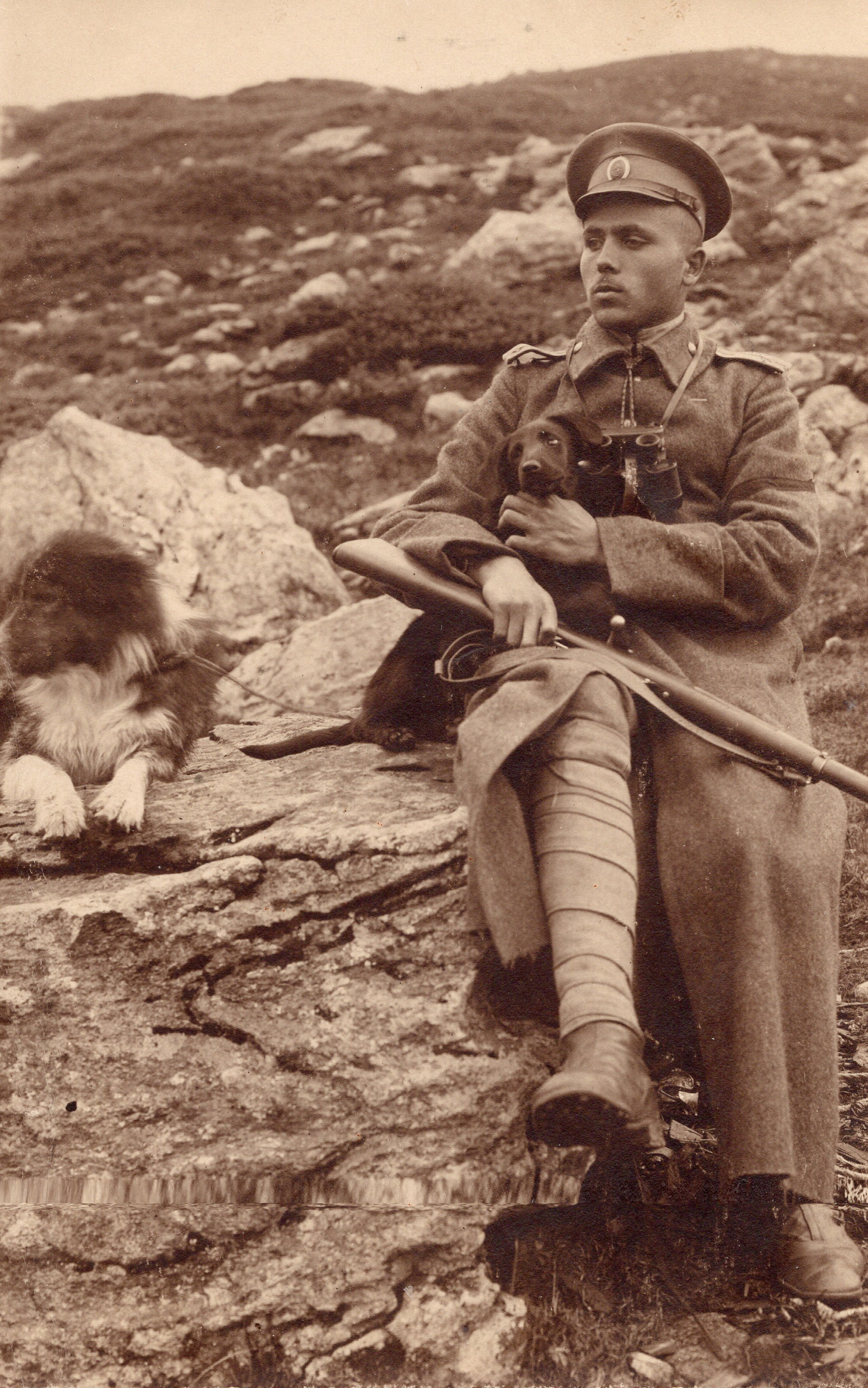
Nayden Saev, 1916, WW 1

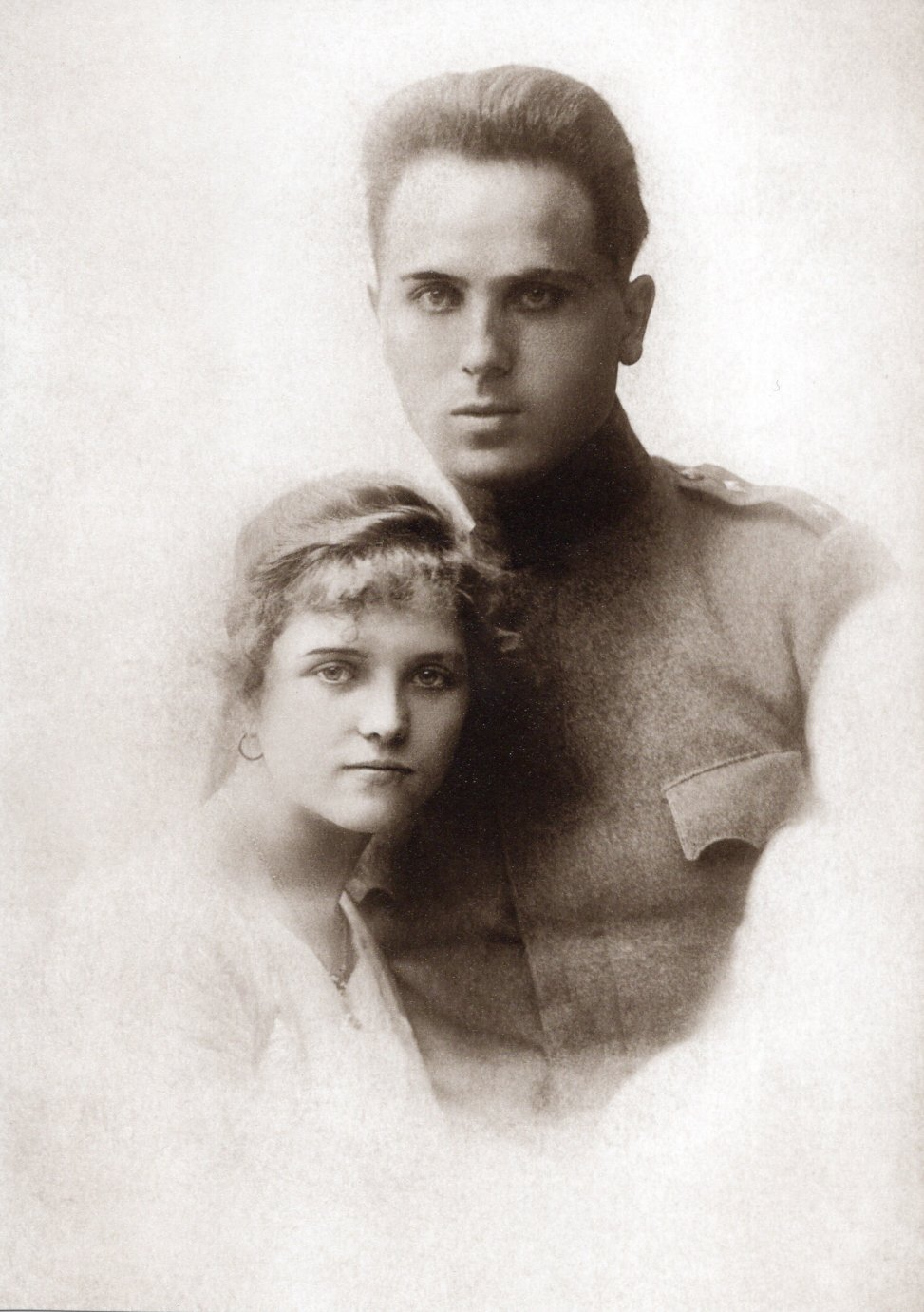
Nayden Saev with his wife Milka June 24.19.20, Sofia

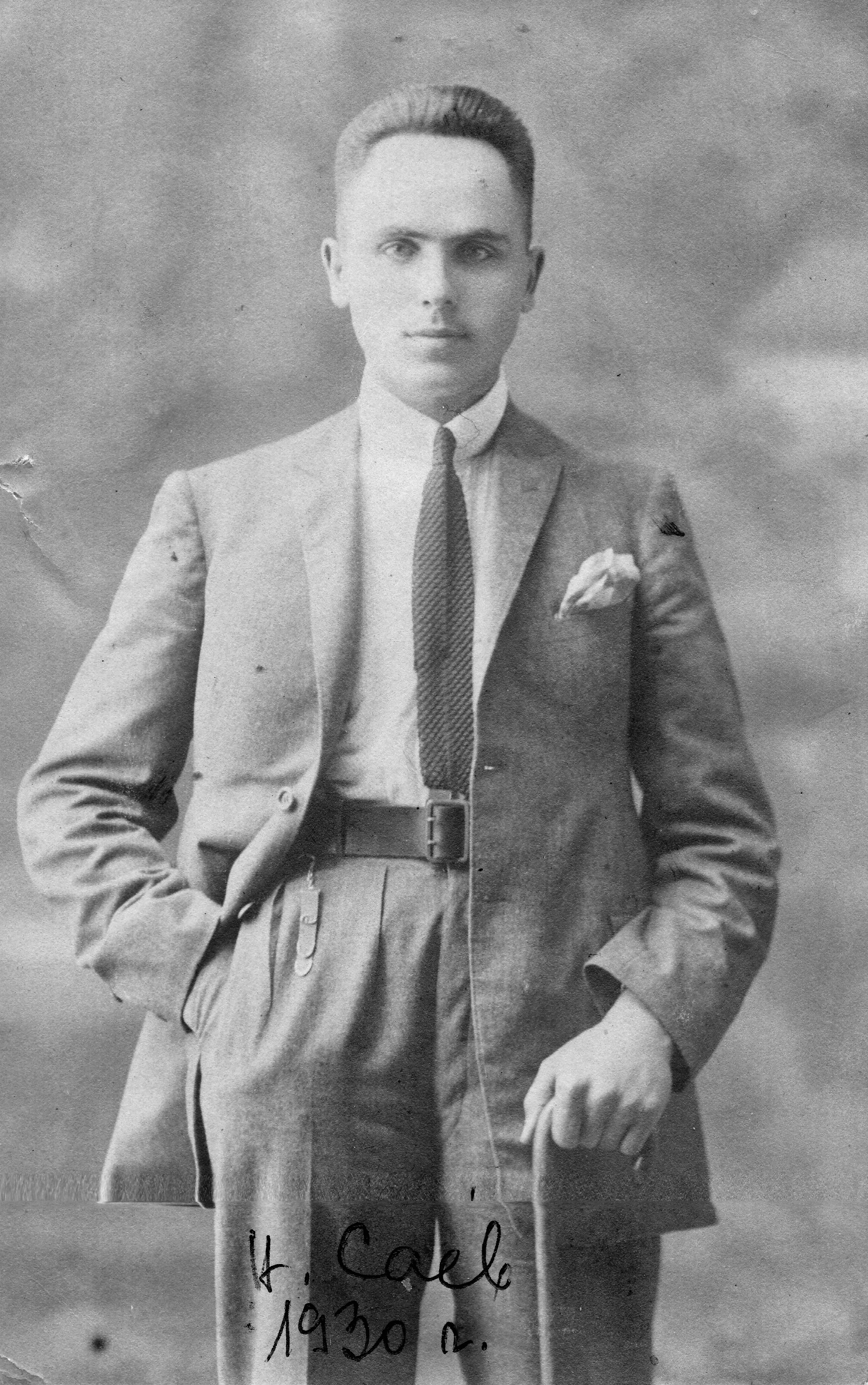
Nayden Saev 1930, Marseille

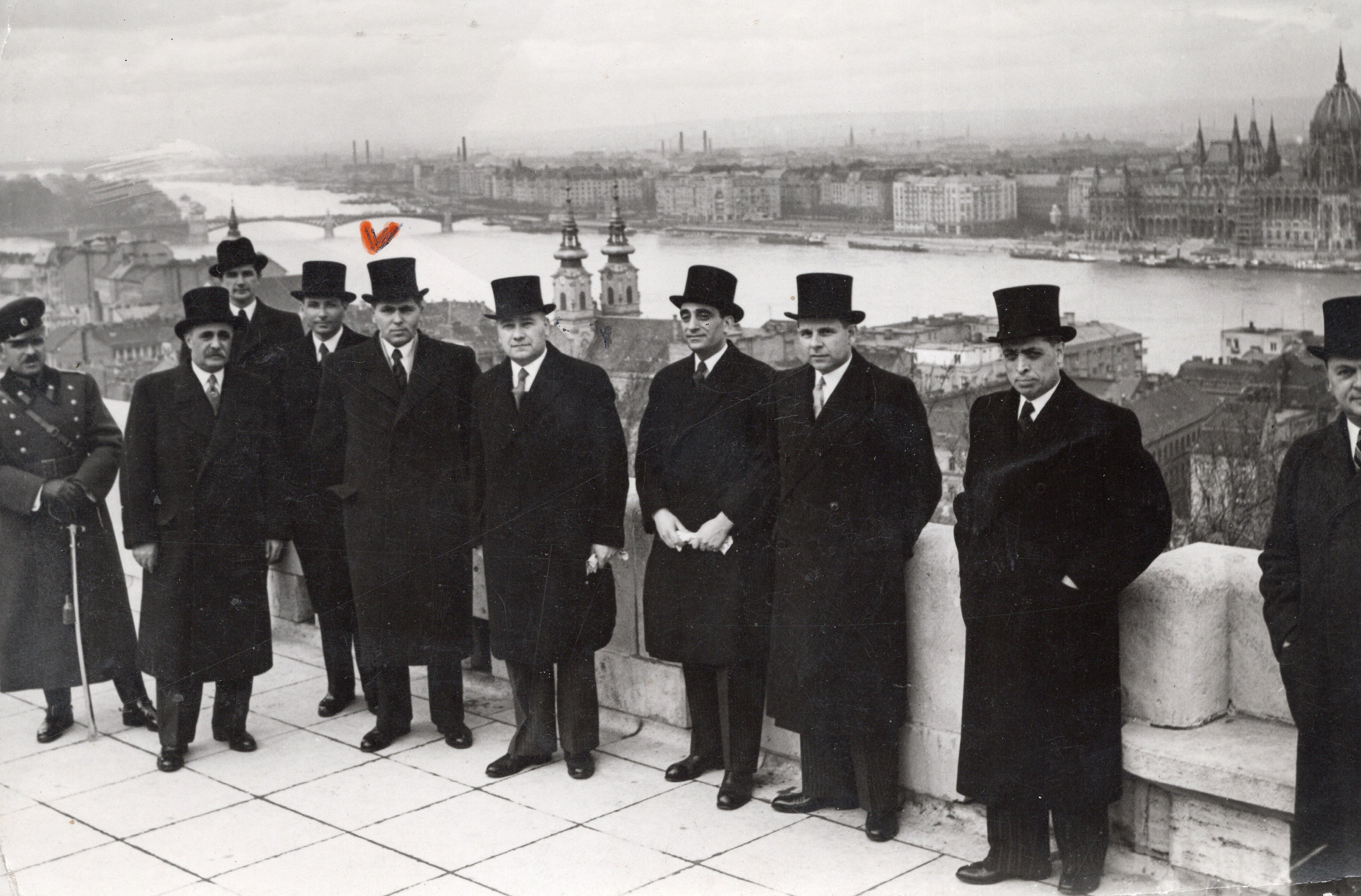
Nayden Saev March 5 1941, Budapest

Nayden Saev, Ishtvan de Barczihaza and others at the funeral of Tzar Boris III of Bulgaria, Sept. 1943, Sofia
