= Juan Paladino =

Uruguayan fencer (1925–1996)

Personal information
- Born: 17 February 1925 Montevideo, Uruguay
- Died: 17 July 1996 (aged 71) Montevideo, Uruguay

Sport
- Sport: Fencing

Juan Amalio Paladino Jaunsolo (17 February 1925 – 17 July 1996) was a Uruguayan foil and sabre fencer. He competed at the 1948 and 1960 Summer Olympics. He finished second in the 1955 Pan American Games sabre team competition (with Teodoro Goliardi, Ricardo Rimini, and the non-Olympian José Lardizábal). Paladino died in Montevideo on 17 July 1996, at the age of 71.
