= Gabriel Moiceanu =

Romanian cyclist (1934–2025)

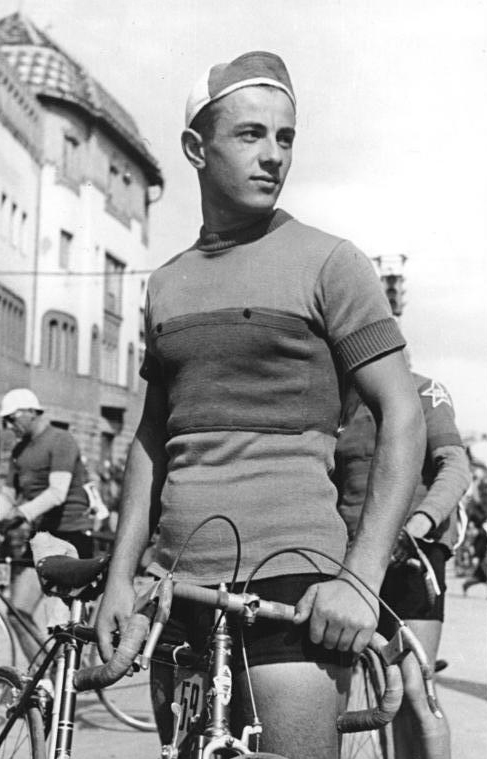
- Moiceanu in 1955

Personal information
- Born: 12 August 1934 Câmpulung, Kingdom of Romania
- Died: 1 December 2025 (aged 91) Valea Mare-Pravăț, Romania
- Height: 1.72 m (5 ft 8 in)
- Weight: 72 kg (159 lb)

Sport
- Sport: Cycling

Gabriel Moiceanu (12 August 1934 – 1 December 2025) was a Romanian cyclist. He competed in the road race at the 1960 and 1964 Summer Olympics; he was 57th in 1964 and failed to finish in 1960. In 1964, he also finished sixth in the 100 km team time trial.

Moiceanu rode the Peace Race in 1956, 1958, 1959, 1961, 1962 and 1964 and won one stage in 1959 and 1964. In 1958, he won the Tour of Romania, and in 1968 was second in the Tour du Maroc.

Moiceanu died on 1 December 2025, at the age of 91.
