= Ryszard Zub =

Polish fencer (1934–2015)

Personal information
- Born: 24 March 1934 Gołogóry, Poland
- Died: 11 January 2015 (aged 80) Padua, Italy

Sport
- Sport: Fencing
Medal record
Men's fencing
Representing Poland
Olympic Games
| Silver medal – second place | 1956 Melbourne | Sabre, team |
| Silver medal – second place | 1960 Rome | Sabre, team |
| Bronze medal – third place | 1964 Tokyo | Sabre, team |

Ryszard Zub (24 March 1934 – 11 January 2015) was a Polish fencer. He won a silver medal in the team sabre events at the 1956 and 1960 Summer Olympics and a bronze in the same event at the 1964 Summer Olympics. He died in Padua at the age of 80 in 2015.
