= Herlander Ribeiro =

Portuguese swimmer (1943–2023)

Personal information
- Born: 30 May 1943 Lisbon, Portugal
- Died: 22 August 2023 (aged 80)

Sport
- Sport: Swimming

Herlander Ribeiro (30 May 1943 – 22 August 2023) was a Portuguese freestyle swimmer. He competed at the 1960 Summer Olympics and the 1964 Summer Olympics.

Ribeiro died on 22 August 2023, at the age of 80.
