= Dieter Löhr =

German fencer (born 1936)

Personal information
- Born: 15 December 1936 (age 89) Leverkusen, Germany

Sport
- Sport: Fencing

Dieter Löhr (born 15 December 1936) is a German fencer. He represented the United Team of Germany at the 1960 Summer Olympics in the team sabre event.
