= Jushar Haschja =

Indonesian fencer

Personal information
- Born: 19 September 1926 Bandung, Indonesia

Sport
- Sport: Fencing

Jushar Haschja (born 19 September 1926) is an Indonesian fencer. He competed in the individual sabre event at the 1960 Summer Olympics.
