= Ramiro Martins =

Portuguese cyclist

Personal information
- Born: 25 September 1941 (age 85) Pontével, Portugal

Cycling career
- Sport: Cycling

Ramiro Martins (born 25 September 1941) is a former Portuguese cyclist. He competed in the individual road race and team time trial events at the 1960 Summer Olympics.
