= Luís Paquete =

Portuguese weightlifter

Personal information
- Nationality: Portuguese
- Born: 6 May 1940; Évora, Portugal
- Died: January 2003

Sport
- Sport: Weightlifting

Luís Paquete (6 May 1940 – January 2003) was a Portuguese weightlifter. He competed at the 1960 Summer Olympics and the 1968 Summer Olympics.
