= Teodoro Goliardi =

Uruguayan fencer (1927–1997)

Personal information
- Born: 28 May 1927 Montevideo, Uruguay
- Died: 14 December 1997 (aged 70)

Sport
- Sport: Fencing

Teodoro Goliardi (28 May 1927 – 14 December 1997) was a Uruguayan fencer. He competed in the individual sabre events at the 1956 and 1960 Summer Olympics. He finished second in the 1955 Pan American Games sabre team competition (with Ricardo Rimini, Juan Paladino, and the non-Olympian José Lardizábal), and third in the 1959 Pan American Games sabre.
