= Roberto Ferrari (fencer) =

Italian fencer (1923–1996)

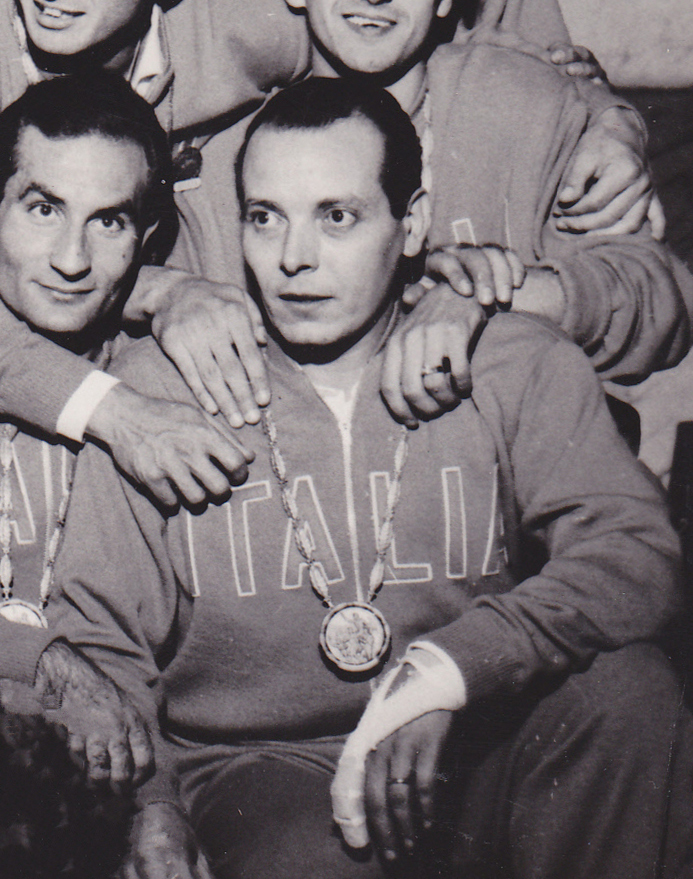
- Roberto Ferrari at the 1960 Olympics

Personal information
- Born: 2 August 1923 Rome, Italy
- Died: 11 October 1996 (aged 73) Rome, Italy
- Height: 1.78 m (5 ft 10 in)
- Weight: 80 kg (180 lb)

Sport
- Sport: Fencing
Medal record
Representing Italy
Olympic Games
Silver medal – second place	1952 Helsinki	Sabre, team
Bronze medal – third place	1960 Rome	Sabre, team
World Championships
Gold medal – first place	1950 Monte Carlo	Sabre, team
Silver medal – second place	1951 Stockholm	Sabre, team
Silver medal – second place	1953 Brussels	Foil, team
Silver medal – second place	1953 Brussels	Sabre, team
Gold medal – first place	1954 Luxemburg	Foil, team
Silver medal – second place	1955 Rome	Sabre, team
Mediterranean Games
Gold medal – first place	1951 Alexandria	Team sabre
Gold medal – first place	1955 Barcelona	Team sabre
Silver medal – second place	1955 Barcelona	Individual sabre
Bronze medal – third place	1951 Alexandria	Individual sabre

Roberto Ferrari (2 August 1923 – 11 October 1996) was an Italian fencer. He competed at the 1952, 1956 and 1960 Olympics and won a silver in 1952 and a bronze in 1960 in the team sabre event. He also competed at the Mediterranean Games in 1951, where he won a gold medal in the team sabre event and a bronze medal in the individual sabre event, and in 1955, where he won a gold medal in the team sabre event and a silver medal in the individual sabre event. Ferrari died in Rome on 11 October 1996, at the age of 73.
