= Raúl Cerqueira =

Portuguese swimmer

Personal information
- Born: 17 May 1940 (age 86) Funchal, Portugal

Sport
- Sport: Swimming

Raúl Cerqueira (born 17 May 1940) is a Portuguese former swimmer. He competed in two events at the 1960 Summer Olympics.
