= David van Gelder =

Israeli fencer (born 1940)

Personal information
- Native name: דוד ואן הלדר
- Born: 4 January 1940 (age 86)

Sport
- Country: Israel
- Sport: Fencing

David van Gelder (Hebrew: דוד ואן הלדר; born 4 January 1940) is an Israeli former fencer. He competed in the individual sabre event at the 1960 Summer Olympics at the age of 20. He was eliminated in round one, after losing all his five bouts.
