= Aleksandar Vasin =

Yugoslav fencer (1933–2016)

Personal information
- Nationality: Yugoslav
- Born: 21 June 1933 Belgrade, Kingdom of Yugoslavia
- Died: 2 April 2016 (aged 82)

Sport
- Sport: Fencing

Aleksandar Vasin (21 June 1933 – 2 April 2016) was a Yugoslav fencer. He competed in the individual sabre event at the 1960 Summer Olympics.
