= Luís Vaz Jorge =

Portuguese swimmer (1943–2026)

Personal information
- Born: 29 October 1943 Algés, Portugal
- Died: June 2026 (aged 82)

Sport
- Sport: Swimming

Luís Vaz Jorge (29 October 1943 – June 2026) was a Portuguese swimmer. He competed in two events at the 1960 Summer Olympics. Vaz Jorge died in June 2026, at the age of 82.
