= Eduardo de Sousa =

Portuguese swimmer (born 1943)

Personal information
- Born: 14 December 1943 (age 82) Algés, Portugal

Sport
- Sport: Swimming

Eduardo de Sousa (born 14 December 1943) is a Portuguese former swimmer. He competed in three events at the 1960 Summer Olympics.
