= Helmuth Resch =

Austrian fencer

Personal information
- Born: 22 May 1933 (age 93) Vienna, Austria

Sport
- Sport: Fencing

Helmuth Resch (born 22 May 1933) is an Austrian fencer. He competed in the individual and team sabre events at the 1960 Summer Olympics.
