= Cornel Pelmuș =

Romanian fencer

Personal information
- Born: 11 September 1933 Bucharest, Romania
- Died: 24 November 2017 (aged 84)

Sport
- Sport: Fencing

Cornel Pelmuș (11 September 1933 – 24 November 2017) was a Romanian fencer. He competed in the team sabre event at the 1960 Summer Olympics.
