= Pablo Ordejón =

Spanish fencer (born 1930)

Personal information
- Born: 15 October 1930 (age 95) Segovia, Spain

Sport
- Sport: Fencing
Medal record
Mediterranean Games
Silver medal – second place	1959 Beirut	Team sabre

Pablo Ordejón (born 15 October 1930) is a Spanish fencer. He competed in the individual and team sabre events at the 1960 Summer Olympics. He won a silver medal at the 1959 Mediterranean Games in the team sabre event.
