= César de Diego =

Spanish fencer (1924–2015)

Personal information
- Born: 18 June 1924 Oviedo, Spain
- Died: July 2015 (aged 91)

Sport
- Sport: Fencing
Medal record
Mediterranean Games
Silver medal – second place	1959 Beirut	Team sabre

César de Diego (18 June 1924 – July 2015) was a Spanish fencer. He competed in the individual and team sabre events at the 1960 Summer Olympics. He also competed at the 1959 Mediterranean Games where he won a silver medal in the team sabre event
