= Asen Dyakovski =

Bulgarian fencer (1933–2024)

- Asen Dyakovski in Sofia (1954)

Personal information
- Born: 20 August 1933 Sofia, Bulgaria
- Died: 25 October 2024 (aged 91)

Sport
- Sport: Fencing

Asen Dyakovski (Bulgarian: Асен Дяковски; 20 August 1933 – 25 October 2024) was a Bulgarian fencer. He competed in the individual foil and sabre events at the 1960 Summer Olympics.

Dyakovski died on 25 October 2024, at the age of 91.
