= José Van Baelen =

Belgian fencer

Personal information
- Born: 20 February 1927 Jambes, Belgium
- Died: 30 January 2015 (aged 87)

Sport
- Sport: Fencing

José Van Baelen (20 February 1927 – 30 January 2015) was a Belgian fencer. He competed in the individual and team sabre events at the 1960 Summer Olympics.
