= Ramón Martínez (fencer) =

Spanish fencer (1926–1999)

Personal information
- Born: 12 June 1926 Segovia, Spain
- Died: 3 August 1999 (aged 73)

Sport
- Sport: Fencing
Medal record
Mediterranean Games
Silver medal – second place	1959 Beirut	Team sabre

Ramón Martínez (12 June 1926 – 3 August 1999) was a Spanish fencer. He competed in the individual and team sabre events at the 1960 Summer Olympics. He won a silver medal at the 1959 Mediterranean Games in the team sabre event.
