= Wilfried Wöhler =

German fencer

Personal information
- Born: 9 February 1935 Haan, Germany
- Died: 29 August 2019 (aged 84) Cologne, Germany

Sport
- Sport: Fencing

Wilfried Wöhler (9 February 1935 – 29 August 2019) was a German fencer. He represented the United Team of Germany at the 1960 Summer Olympics in the individual and team sabre events.
