= Günther Ulrich =

Austrian fencer (born 1936)

Personal information
- Born: 10 May 1936 (age 90) Nový Jičín, Czechoslovakia

Sport
- Sport: Fencing
- Club: Balmung Wien

Günther Ulrich (born 10 May 1936) is an Austrian sabre fencer. He competed at the 1960 and 1972 Summer Olympics.

Ulrich was a member of the Balmung Wien fencing club, the same club as Friedrieke Wenisch-Filz.
