= Josef Wanetschek =

Austrian fencer

Personal information
- Born: 31 December 1933 (age 92) Vienna, Austria

Sport
- Sport: Fencing

Josef Wanetschek (born 31 December 1933) is an Austrian fencer. He competed in the individual and team sabre events at the 1960 Summer Olympics.
