= Nugzar Asatiani =

Soviet fencer (1937–1992)

Personal information
- Born: 16 July 1937 Imereti, Georgian SSR, Soviet Union
- Died: 2 April 1992 (aged 54) Tbilisi, Georgia

Sport
- Sport: Fencing
Medal record
Men's fencing
Representing Soviet Union
Olympic Games
Gold medal – first place	1964 Tokyo	Team sabre
World Championships
Gold medal – first place	1965 Paris	Team sabre
Silver medal – second place	1961 Turin	Team sabre
Silver medal – second place	1963 Gdansk	Team sabre
Silver medal – second place	1966 Moscow	Team sabre
Bronze medal – third place	1962 Buenos Aires	Team sabre
Summer Universiade
Silver medal – second place	1961 Sofia	Individual sabre
Silver medal – second place	1961 Sofia	Team sabre

Nugzar Asatiani (Georgian: ნუგზარ ასათიანი; 16 July 1937 – 2 April 1992) was a Soviet fencer. He won a gold medal in the team sabre event at the 1964 Summer Olympics.
