= Michael D'Asaro Sr. =

American fencer (1938–2000)

Personal information
- Born: March 14, 1938
- Died: December 12, 2000 (aged 62)

Fencing career
- Sport: Fencing
- Weapon: Sabre, Foil, Épée
- Hand: Left (Taught in left and right)
Medal record
Representing United States
Men's Fencing
Pan American Games
| Silver medal – second place | 1959 Chicago | Individual sabre |
| Silver medal – second place | 1959 Chicago | Individual epee |
| Gold medal – first place | 1959 Chicago | Team epee |
| Gold medal – first place | 1963 São Paulo | Team sabre |
USFA National Championships
| Gold medal – first place | 1959 | Team foil |
| Bronze medal – third place | 1963 | Individual foil |

Michael D'Asaro Sr. (March 14, 1938 – December 12, 2000) was an American fencing master and coach.

D'Asaro was a Pan American Games, U.S., and World Military Sabre Champion, and had the particular distinction of being perhaps the last top-level three-weapon competitor. He was also a fencing coach at San Jose State University.

== Accomplishments ==
=== Sabre ===
- 1960 Summer Olympics – 4th place US team.
- Pan American Games – 1st in individual and team, 1963.
- Nationals – 1st, 1962, medalist in '60, '66, and '67.
- NCAA – 1st 1960.

=== Foil ===
Nationals – 3rd, 1963, 1st (team) 1959.

=== Épée ===
Pan American Games – 2nd (individual), 1st (team), 1959. Martini-Rossi – 3rd, 1963.

=== Coaching ===
Olympic Coach and member of the National Coaching Staff: 1976 Olympics, 1977 World University Games, 1975 and '79 Pan American Games, and 1973 and '74 Junior World Championships.

=== Honors ===
D'Asaro was inducted into the USFA Hall of Fame in 2002.

He finished his coaching career at Westside Fencing Center in Los Angeles.

== Miscellaneous ==
His former wife, Gay Jacobsen D'Asaro, was a member of the 1976 and 1980 US Women's Olympic Foil Teams. His son, Michael D'Asaro Jr., coached in California at California Institute of Technology, Santa Barbara Fencing Academy and his soon to open club, Salle D'asaro. Michael Jr. has now relocated to Trophy Club, Texas. He's also made mention of a new fencing club.

=== Former students ===
- Jeff Richardson
- Darrell Bluhm
- Michael D'asaro Jr.
- Thom Cate
- Soren Thompson, two-time Olympian in épée and world champion

== See also ==
- United States Fencing Association
- List of USFA Division I National Champions
- List of NCAA fencing champions
- List of USFA Hall of Fame members
