= Dumitru Mustață =

Romanian fencer

Personal information
- Born: 28 April 1929 Richiţele, Romania
- Died: 1977 (aged 47–48)

Sport
- Sport: Fencing

Dumitru Mustață (28 April 1929 – 1977) was a Romanian fencer. He competed in the individual and team sabre events at the 1960 Summer Olympics.
