= Emeric Arus =

Romanian fencer (1938–2022)

Personal information
- Born: Imre Árus; 9 June 1938 Oradea, Romania
- Died: 10 October 2022 (aged 84) U.S.

Sport
- Sport: Fencing

Emeric Arus (9 June 1938 – 10 October 2022) was a Romanian fencer. He competed in the individual and team sabre events at the 1960 Summer Olympics.

Arus died on 10 October 2022, at the age of 84.
