= Ion Santo (fencer born 1940) =

Romanian fencer

Personal information
- Born: 12 March 1940 (age 86) Ghermata, Romania

Sport
- Sport: Fencing

Ion Santo (born 12 March 1940) is a Romanian fencer. He competed in the team sabre event at the 1960 Summer Olympics.
