= Gustavo Vassallo (fencer) =

Argentine fencer (1920–2012)

Personal information
- Born: 20 July 1920 Buenos Aires, Argentina
- Died: 1 August 2012 (aged 92)

Sport
- Sport: Fencing

Gustavo Vassallo (20 July 1920 – 1 August 2012) was an Argentine fencer. He competed in the individual and team sabre events at the 1960 Summer Olympics.
