= Joaquim Rodrigues =

Portuguese fencer

Personal information
- Born: 13 March 1935 (age 91) Castelo Branco, Portugal

Sport
- Sport: Fencing

Joaquim Rodrigues (born 13 March 1935) is a Portuguese fencer. He competed in the individual and team sabre events at the 1960 Summer Olympics.
