= Ladislau Rohony =

Romanian fencer

Personal information
- Born: László Rohony; 1 September 1938 (age 87) Cluj, Romania

Sport
- Sport: Fencing

Ladislau Rohony (born 1 September 1938) is a Romanian fencer. He competed in the individual and team sabre events at the 1960 Summer Olympics.
