= Orlando Azinhais =

Portuguese fencer (1933–2005)

Personal information
- Born: 9 September 1933 Marinha Grande, Portugal
- Died: 12 March 2005 (aged 71)

Sport
- Sport: Fencing

Orlando Azinhais (9 September 1933 – 12 March 2005) was a Portuguese épée, foil and sabre fencer. He competed in three events at the 1960 Summer Olympics.
