= António Marquilhas =

Portuguese fencer

Personal information
- Born: 7 July 1933 Beja, Portugal
- Died: 22 August 2018 (aged 85)

Sport
- Sport: Fencing

António Marquilhas (7 July 1933 – 22 August 2018) was a Portuguese fencer. He competed in the individual and team sabre events at the 1960 Summer Olympics.
