= Juan Larrea (fencer) =

Argentine fencer

Personal information
- Born: 17 April 1935 (age 91) Buenos Aires, Argentina
- Height: 173 cm (68 in)
- Weight: 69 kg (152 lb)

Sport
- Country: Argentina
- Sport: Fencing

Juan Larrea (born 17 April 1935) is an Argentine fencer. He competed in the individual and team sabre events at the 1960 Summer Olympics.
