= Deaths in October 1999 =

The following is a list of notable deaths in October 1999.

Entries for each day are listed alphabetically by surname. A typical entry lists information in the following sequence:

- Name, age, country of citizenship at birth, subsequent country of citizenship (if applicable), reason for notability, cause of death (if known), and reference.

== October 1999 ==
=== 1 ===
- Ted Arison, 75, Israeli businessman, heart attack.
- Pietro Maria Bardi, 99, Italian writer, curator and collector.
- Kuei Chih-hung, 61, Hong Kong filmmaker, liver cancer.
- Glen Foster, 69, American sailor and Olympic medalist (1972), esophageal cancer.
- Norbert Felix Gaughan, 78, American prelate of the Roman Catholic Church.
- Noel Johnson, 82, English actor.
- Gunnar Ljungström, 94, Swedish aerodynamics and automobile engineer.
- Wim Polak, 75, Dutch politician, mayor of Amsterdam (1977–1983), cancer.
- Rod Webb, 89, Canadian politician, member of the House of Commons of Canada (1959-1968).
- Lena Zavaroni, 35, Scottish singer and a television show host, pneumonia.

=== 2 ===
- Muhammad Nasiruddin al-Albani, Albanian Islamic scholar.
- John Bugeja, 66, Maltese Olympic cyclist (1960).
- Frank Duncan, 79, American baseball player.
- Kim Hyun-jun, 39, South Korean basketball player and Olympian (1988), traffic collision.
- Tosio Katō, 82, Japanese mathematician.
- Heinz G. Konsalik, 78, German novelist.
- R. S. Krishnan, 88, Indian experimental physicist and scientist.
- Lee Lozano, 68, American painter and visual artist.
- Danny Mayo, 49, American songwriter, heart attack.
- Pascual Pistarini, 83, Argentine general and Olympian equestrian (1948).
- Lee Richardson, 73, American actor (Prizzi's Honor, Brubaker, Network).
- Wayne Sevier, 58, American gridiron football coach, heart attack.
- Georg Tintner, 82, Austrian conductor, suicide by jumping.

=== 3 ===
- Paul Burris, 76, American baseball player (Boston/Milwaukee Braves).
- Alastair Hetherington, 79, British journalist and editor of The Guardian.
- N. Mohanan, 66, Indian Malayalam -language short story writer and novelist.
- Akio Morita, 78, Japanese businessman and co-founder of Sony, pneumonia.

=== 4 ===
- Bernard Buffet, 71, French painter, suicide by asphyxiation.
- Art Farmer, 71, American jazz trumpeter and flugelhorn player.
- De Villiers Graaff, 85, South African politician.
- Nikkyō Niwano, 92, Japanese Buddhist leader.
- Emil Schumacher, 87, German painter.
- Rod Shoate, 46, American gridiron football player (New England Patriots).
- Leonard Shoen, 83, American entrepreneur, suicide by traffic collision.
- Ted Strain, 82, American basketball player.
- Robert G. L. Waite, 80, Canadian historian, psychohistorian, and academic.

=== 5 ===
- Tom Bienemann, 71, American football player (Chicago Cardinals).
- Fernand Dubé, 70, Canadian lawyer and politician, heart attack.
- Earl Evans, 89, American biochemist.
- Alex Lowe, 40, American mountaineer, avalanche.
- Frank K. Richardson, 85, American attorney and judge, Parkinson's disease.
- Jack Somerville, 89, New Zealand presbyterian leader.

=== 6 ===
- Ken Campbell, 73, American basketball player.
- Larry Floyd, 91, Australian politician.
- Randi Kolstad, 74, Norwegian theater and screen actress.
- Gorilla Monsoon, 62, American wrestler and commentator, complications of diabetes.
- Bob Patrick, 81, American baseball player (Detroit Tigers).
- Patrick Reilly, 90, British diplomat and ambassador.
- Amália Rodrigues, 79, Portuguese singer known as the "Queen of Fado", heart attack.
- Tatevik Sazandaryan, 83, Soviet and Armenian operatic mezzo-soprano.
- Maris Wrixon, 82, American film and television actress, heart failure.

=== 7 ===
- Deryck Guyler, 85, English actor.
- David A. Huffman, 74, American computer scientist, cancer.
- Bruce Ritter, 72, American catholic priest and Franciscan friar, cancer.
- Genrikh Sapgir, 70, Russian poet and fiction writer, heart attack.
- Lucien Thèze, 86, French Olympic basketball player (1936).
- Dimitri Tsafendas, 81, Greek-Mozambican political militant, pneumonia.
- Helen Vinson, 92, American film actress.
- Dave Whitsell, 63, American football player (Detroit Lions, Chicago Bears, New Orleans Saints), cancer.

=== 8 ===
- Manfredo Fest, 63, Brazilian bossa nova and jazz pianist and keyboardist.
- Henri Koch-Kent, 94, Luxembourgish publicist, author, and historian.
- Zezé Macedo, 83, Brazilian comedienne and actress.
- John McLendon, 84, American basketball coach.
- Reinis Zusters, 81, Latvian-Australian artist.

=== 9 ===
- Dutch Dotterer, 67, American baseball player (Cincinnati Redlegs/Reds, Washington Senators).
- Milt Jackson, 76, American jazz vibraphonist, liver cancer.
- Akhtar Hameed Khan, 85, Pakistani social scientist, heart attack.
- James M. Logan, 78, American soldier and recipient of the Medal of Honor.
- João Cabral de Melo Neto, 79, Brazilian poet and diplomat.
- Rolf Stein, 88, German-French sinologist and tibetologist.
- Morris West, 83, Australian novelist and playwright.
- Franz Wolf, 92, German nazi SS-Oberscharführer and Holocaust perpetrator during World War II.

=== 10 ===
- Patrick Campbell, 22, Northern Irish republican volunteer, stabbed.
- George Forrest, 84, American writer of music and lyrics for musicals.
- Alfredo Gil, 84, Mexican singer (Trio Los Panchos).
- Gul Hassan Khan, Pakistani Army general.
- Hajime Nakamura, 86, Japanese indologist, philosopher and academic.
- Pinhas Scheinman, 87, Israeli politician.
- Ted White, 86, Australian cricketer.

=== 11 ===
- Adriano Bassetto, 74, Italian football player.
- Fakir Baykurt, 70, Turkish author and trade unionist.
- Galina Bystrova, 65, Soviet athlete and Olympian (1956, 1960, 1964).
- John Foot, Baron Foot, 90, British politician and Life Peer.
- Leo Lionni, 89, Italian-American author and illustrator of children's books, Parkinson's disease.
- Colette Picard, 85, French archaeologist and historian.
- Oscar Valicelli, 84, Argentine film actor.

=== 12 ===
- Carlos Barreto, 23, Venezuelan bantamweight boxer and Olympian (1996), brain trauma sustained during match.
- Wilt Chamberlain, 63, American basketball player (Los Angeles Lakers, Philadelphia 76ers) and actor (Conan the Destroyer), heart failure.
- Olle Danielsson, 87, Swedish Olympic sprinter (1936).
- Frank Frost, 63, American blues harmonica player, cardiac arrest, heart attack.
- Ayako Miura, 77, Japanese novelist, multiple organ dysfunction syndrome.
- Clément Perron, 70, Canadian film director and screenwriter.
- Norman Reddaway, 81, British civil servant and diplomat.
- Siegbert Wirth, 69, American Olympic soccer player (1956).

=== 13 ===
- Leslie Aulds, 78, American baseball player (Boston Red Sox).
- Geoffrey Burke, 86, English Roman Catholic bishop.
- Ingrid Englund, 73, Swedish Olympic alpine skier (1952, 1956).
- Michael Hartnett, 58, Irish poet, alcoholic liver disease.
- Rik Matthys, 74, Belgian footballer.
- James E. Williams, 68, American Cherokee indian and Medal of Honor recipient.
- Qasem-Ali Zahirnejad, Iranian Army general, stroke.

=== 14 ===
- Lage Andersson, 79, Swedish weightlifter and Olympian (1952).
- Franca Dominici, 92, Italian actress and voice actress.
- Diethard Hellmann, 70, German Kantor and an academic.
- Julius Nyerere, 77, Tanzanian anti-colonial activist and politician, leukemia.
- Richard B. Shull, 70, American actor, heart attack.
- Jerry Walter McFadden, 51, American serial killer and sex offender, execution by lethal injection.

=== 15 ===
- Yosef Burg, 90, German-born Israeli politician.
- Durgawati Devi, 92, Indian revolutionary and a freedom fighter.
- Terry Gilkyson, 83, American folk singer, composer, and lyricist.
- Eddie Jones, 64, British science fiction illustrator.
- Torsten Lilliecrona, 78, Swedish actor.
- Josef Locke, 82, Irish tenor.
- Steve Ramsey, 51, American gridiron football player (New Orleans Saints, Denver Broncos), traffic collision.
- Bill Rieth, 83, American football player (Cleveland Rams).

=== 16 ===
- Bobbie Beard, 69, American child actor.
- Bruce Cameron, 43, American guitarist, suicide.
- Bill Dodgin, 90, English football player, manager and coach.
- Ella Mae Morse, 75, American popular singer, respiratory failure.
- Jean Shepherd, 78, American raconteur, radio and TV personality, writer and actor.

=== 17 ===
- Hugh Bolton, 70, Canadian ice hockey player (Toronto Maple Leafs).
- William Gould Dow, 104, American scientist, educator and inventor.
- Tommy Durden, 79, American guitarist and songwriter.
- Richard John Harrison, 79, British academic.
- Rick Lapointe, 44, Canadian ice hockey player, heart attack.
- Nicholas Metropolis, 84, Greek-American physicist.
- Ralph Grey, Baron Grey of Naunton, 89, New Zealand peer and last Governor of Northern Ireland.
- Francisco Uva, 95, Portuguese Olympic fencer (1952).
- Charles Wanstall, 87, Australian politician.
- Franz Peter Wirth, 80, German film director and screenwriter.

=== 18 ===
- Dallas Bower, 92, British director and producer.
- Mahanambrata Brahmachari, 94, Hindu monk.
- John Cannon, 66, Canadian sports car racer, aircraft crash.
- Tony Crombie, 74, English jazz drummer, pianist, bandleader and composer.
- Paddi Edwards, 68, British-American actress, respiratory failure.
- Dick Hammer, 69, American athlete, actor, and Olympian (1964).
- John James, 88, Canadian politician, member of the House of Commons of Canada (1949-1957).
- Ross Parmenter, 87, Canadian music critic, editor, and author.

=== 19 ===
- Carrie Abramovitz, 86, American sculptor, collagist, and economist
- Auður Auðuns, 88, Icelandic lawyer and politician.
- Harry Bannink, 70, Dutch composer, arranger and pianist.
- Robert Black, 93, British colonial administrator, Governor of Singapore (1955–1957).
- Hayes Gordon, 79, American actor, stage director and acting teacher, heart disease.
- Ray Katt, 72, American baseball player (New York Giants, St. Louis Cardinals), and coach, lymphoma.
- Zeng Liansong, 81, Chinese economist and designer of the nation's flag.
- Penelope Mortimer, 81, English journalist, biographer and novelist, cancer.
- James C. Murray, 82, American politician, member of the United States House of Representatives (1955-1957).
- Nathalie Sarraute, 99, French writer and lawyer.
- E. J. Scovell, 92, English poet and translator.

=== 20 ===
- Hans Georg Amsel, 94, German entomologist.
- Loukas Barlos, 79, Greek businessman, lung cancer.
- Agim Çavdarbasha, 55, Kosovo-Albanian sculptor.
- Calvin Griffith, 87, American Major League Baseball team owner.
- Mae Street Kidd, 95, American businesswoman, civic leader and politician.
- Pertti Laine, 60, Finnish Olympic rower (1960).
- Jack Lynch, 82, Irish Fianna Fáil politician and fourth Taoiseach (1966–1973, 1977–1979), cerebrovascular disease.
- Willi Schröder, 70, German football player and Olympian (1952).
- Abdullah Sungkar, 62, Indonesian islamist and founder of terror group Jemaah Islamiyah.
- Earl Turner, 76, American baseball player (Pittsburgh Pirates).

=== 21 ===
- Queenie Ashton, 95, Australian actress.
- Ludwig Beisiegel, 87, German Olympic field hockey player (1936).
- Lars Bo, 75, Danish artist and writer.
- John Bromwich, 80, Australian tennis player.
- Esther Fernández, 84, Mexican film and television actress, lung infarction.
- H. Stuart Hughes, 83, American historian, professor, and activist.
- LaMont Johnson, 58, American jazz pianist, heart failure.
- Ahmet Taner Kışlalı, 60, Turkish politician, intellectual, lawyer, columnist, and academic.
- Horst Krüger, 80, German novelist.
- Fran O'Brien, 63, American football player (Cleveland Browns, Washington Redskins, Pittsburgh Steelers), heart attack.
- Heinz Renneberg, 72, West German rower and Olympic champion (1952, 1960).
- Gennady Vasilyev, 59, Russian film director, cerebral hemorrhage.
- Eric Wauters, 48, Belgian equestrian and Olympic medalist (1972, 1976, 1996).

=== 22 ===
- Alphonse Anger, 84, French gymnast and Olympian (1948).
- Martin Donnelly, 82, New Zealand cricketer and England rugby player.
- Frank Jardine, 75, British ice hockey player and Olympian (1948).
- Laure Koster, 97, Luxembourgian Olympic swimmer (1924).
- Tibor Mamusich, 87, Hungarian rower and Olympian (1936).
- Ed Mikan, 74, American basketball player.
- István Nagy, 60, Hungarian football player and Olympian (1964).
- Gordon Smith, 91, American Olympic ice hockey player (1932, 1936).
- Irv Spencer, 61, Canadian ice hockey player (New York Rangers, Boston Bruins, Detroit Red Wings).
- Luigi Spozio, 63, Italian Olympic rower (1960).

=== 23 ===
- Jean Dauger, 79, French rugby player.
- András Hegedüs, 76, Hungarian communist politician.
- Neriman Köksal, 71, Turkish actress, breast cancer.
- Trudi Meyer, 85, German Olympic gymnast (1936).
- Eric Reece, 90, Australian politician, Premier of Tasmania (1958–1969).
- Luciano Soprani, Italian fashion designer, throat cancer.
- Cyril James Stubblefield, 98, British geologist.
- Albert Tucker, 84, Australian artist.
- Francis Whitaker, 93, American artist and blacksmith.
- Bobby Willis, 57, British songwriter, lung and liver cancer.

=== 24 ===
- Frank Bohlmann, 82, American football player (Chicago Cardinals).
- John Chafee, 77, American politician, member of the U.S. Senate (since 1976) and Governor of Rhode Island (1963–1969), congestive heart failure.
- Lucien De Muynck, 68, Belgian middle-distance runner and Olympian (1952).
- Georges Gandil, 73, French Olympic sprint canoeist (1948).
- Ginette Harrison, 41, British climber, climbing accident.
- Peter Mingie, 68, Canadian Olympic swimmer (1948).
- Berthe Qvistgaard, 89, Danish stage and film actress.
- Philip Sansom, 83, British anarchist writer and activist.
- Marc Simenon, 60, French director and screenwriter, fall.

=== 25 ===
- Leonard Boyle, 75, Irish and Canadian scholar in medieval studies and palaeography.
- Vittorio Erspamer, 90, Italian pharmacologist and chemist.
- Rosalie Gascoigne, 82, New Zealand-Australian sculptor.
- Arturo Herbruger, 87, Guatemalan politician.
- Samson Kisekka, 87, Ugandan politician, heart attack.
- Johannes Käbin, 94, Soviet and Estonian politician.
- Victor Saúde Maria, 60, Bissau-Guinean politician, assassination.
- Carlos Martí, 80, Spanish Olympic water polo player (1948).
- Joe Proksa, 85, American basketball player.
- S. Rajeswara Rao, 77, Indian composer and musician.
- David Spence Thomson, 83, New Zealand politician.
- Notable Americans killed in 1999 South Dakota Learjet crash:
  - Bruce Borland, 40, golf designer.
  - Payne Stewart, 42, golfer.

=== 26 ===
- Maria Alba, 89, Spanish-American film actress.
- Hoyt Axton, 61, American folk music singer-songwriter and actor, heart attack.
- Eknath Easwaran, 88, Indian-American spiritual teacher and author.
- Rex Gildo, 63, German singer of schlager ballads, suicide by jumping.
- Christiane Jaccottet, 62, Swiss harpsichordist and musicologist.
- Abraham Polonsky, 88, American film director, screenwriter, essayist and novelist.
- Stephen Roberts, 82, American actor.
- Charles Earl Simons Jr., 83, American district judge (United States District Court for the District of South Carolina).
- Albert Whitlock, 84, British motion picture matte artist, Parkinson's disease.

=== 27 ===
- Wes Berggren, 28, American musician and guitarist for rock band Tripping Daisy, drug overdose.
- Johnny Byrne, 60, English footballer, heart attack.
- Lois Collier, 80, American film actress, Alzheimer's disease.
- Frank De Vol, 88, American arranger, composer and actor, heart failure.
- Xie Fei, 66, Chinese politician, Politburo member, leukemia.
- Robert Mills, 72, American physicist.
- José Aarón Alvarado Nieves, 33, Mexican professional wrestler, infection.
- Éamonn O'Doherty, 60, Northern Irish political activist.
- Charlotte Perriand, 96, French architect and designer.
- Lew Rush, 87, Canadian Olympic cyclist (1932).
- Glen Vernon, 76, American actor.
- Austin B. Williams, 80, American carcinologist, cancer.
- Notable victims killed in the Armenian parliament shooting in Yerevan, Armenia:
  - Vazgen Sargsyan, 40, Prime Minister
  - Karen Demirchyan, 67, National Assembly Speaker
  - Yuri Bakhshyan, 52, Deputy National Assembly Speaker
  - Ruben Miroyan, 60, Deputy National Assembly Speaker
  - Leonard Petrosyan, 46, Minister of Urgent Affairs
  - Henrik Abrahamyan, 60, Member of Parliament
  - Mikayel Kotanyan, 72, Member of Parliament

=== 28 ===
- Howard Browne, 91, American science fiction editor and mystery writer.
- Ralph Crosthwaite, 63, American basketball player (Western Kentucky Hilltoppers).
- Antonis Katinaris, 68, Greek musician.
- Rafael Alberti Merello, 96, Spanish poet.
- Gastone Pescucci, 73, Italian actor and voice actor.

=== 29 ===
- Kamal Adham, 69-70, Saudi businessman, heart attack.
- Brita Appelgren, 86, Swedish film actress.
- Tom Dickinson, 102, American football player.
- Rosa Furman, 69, Mexican actress, cardiac arrest.
- Greg, 68, Belgian cartoonist, aneurysm.
- Cavan Kendall, 57, British actor, cancer.
- Colin Matthew, 58, British historian and academic, heart attack.
- Aolar Mosely, 87, American artist.
- Borhan Abu Samah, 34, Singaporean football player, liver cancer.

=== 30 ===
- Ratko Čolić, 81, Serbian football player and Olympian (1952).
- Nise da Silveira, 94, Brazilian psychiatrist and student of Carl Jung, pneumonia.
- Renato Giovanelli, 76, Italian architect.
- Grace McDonald, 81, American actress, pneumonia.
- Uxío Novoneyra, 69, Spanish poet, journalist and children's writer.
- Max Patkin, 79, American baseball player (Cleveland Indians), and clown.
- Gábor Pogány, 84, Hungarian-born Italian cinematographer.
- Savumiamoorthy Thondaman, 86, Sri Lankan politician.
- Maigonis Valdmanis, 66, Soviet Latvian basketball player and Olympian (1952, 1956, 1960).
- Paul Wheatley, 78, British-American historical geographer.

=== 31 ===
- Gameel Al-Batouti, 59, Egyptian aviator, relief first officer on EgyptAir Flight 990
- Denise Bellon, 97, French photographer.
- Milton Brink, 88, American ice hockey player (Chicago Black Hawks).
- August Chełkowski, 72, Polish physicist and politician.
- Sven-Olov Eriksson, 70, Swedish Olympic hurdler (1952).
- John Wainwright Evans, 90, American astronomer, murder–suicide.
- Howard Ferguson, 91, Irish composer and musicologist.
- Martin Hellberg, 94, German actor, director and writer.
- Immanuel Jakobovits, Baron Jakobovits, 78, British rabbi.
- Maurice Lafforgue, 84, French alpine skier and Olympian (1936).
- Greg Moore, 24, Canadian racecar driver, racing accident.
- Wyatt Ruther, 76, American jazz double-bassist.
