= Vazgen Sargsyan =

Armenian military commander, politician (1959–1999)

National Hero of Armenia Vazgen Sargsyan
- Վազգեն Սարգսյան
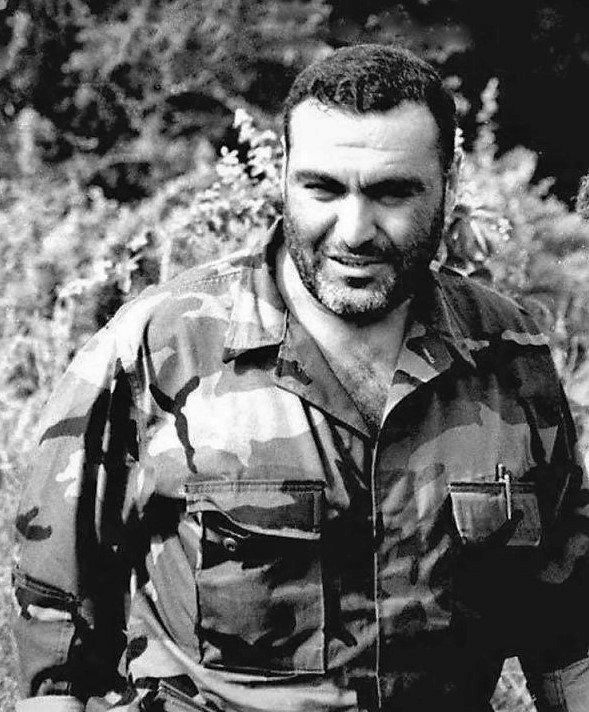

8th Prime Minister of Armenia
- In office 11 June 1999 – 27 October 1999
- President: Robert Kocharyan
- Preceded by: Armen Darbinyan
- Succeeded by: Aram Sargsyan

Defence Minister of Armenia
- In office 25 July 1995 – 11 June 1999
- President: Levon Ter-Petrosyan; Robert Kocharyan
- Preceded by: Serzh Sargsyan
- Succeeded by: Vagharshak Harutiunyan
- In office 5 December 1991 – 20 October 1992
- President: Levon Ter-Petrosyan
- Preceded by: Drastamat Kanayan (1920)
- Succeeded by: Vazgen Manukyan

Leader of the Republican Party
- In office 1998–1999
- Preceded by: Ashot Navasardyan
- Succeeded by: Andranik Margaryan

State Minister on Defence, National Security and Internal Affairs
- In office July 1993 – 25 July 1995
- President: Levon Ter-Petrosyan
- Preceded by: Position established
- Succeeded by: Serzh Sargsyan

Presidential Adviser on Defence Affairs
- In office 20 October 1992 – 5 March 1993
- President: Levon Ter-Petrosyan
- Preceded by: Position established
- Succeeded by: Vazgen Manukyan

Head of the Supreme Council Commission on Defence and Internal Affairs
- In office June 1990 – 5 December 1991
- President: Levon Ter-Petrosyan
- Preceded by: Position established
- Succeeded by: Position abolished

Personal details
- Born: 5 March 1959 Ararat, Armenian SSR, Soviet Union
- Died: 27 October 1999 (aged 40) Yerevan, Armenia
- Cause of death: Assassination by firearm
- Resting place: Yerablur
- Party: Pan-Armenian National Movement (1990–1998); Republican Party of Armenia (1998–1999)
- Relations: Aram Sargsyan (brother)
- Education: Yerevan Institute of Physical Culture
- Occupation: Politician; military commander; teacher; writer
- Awards: National Hero of Armenia; Hero of Artsakh
- Nickname: Sparapet

Military service
- Branch/service: Armed Forces of Armenia; Armenian militia
- Years of service: 1989–1994
- Rank: Colonel
- Battles/wars: First Nagorno-Karabakh War

Vazgen Zaveni Sargsyan (Armenian: Վազգեն Զավենի Սարգսյան, pronounced [vɑzˈɡɛn zɑvɛˈni sɑɾkʰəsˈjɑn]; 5 March 1959 – 27 October 1999) was an Armenian military commander and politician. He was the first Defence Minister of Armenia from 1991 to 1992 and then from 1995 to 1999. He served as Armenia's prime minister from 11 June 1999 until his assassination on 27 October of that year. He rose to prominence during the mass movement for the unification of Nagorno-Karabakh with Armenia in the late 1980s and led Armenian volunteer groups during the early clashes with Azerbaijani forces. Appointed defence minister by President Levon Ter-Petrosyan soon after Armenia's independence from the Soviet Union in late 1991, Sargsyan became the most prominent commander of Armenian forces during the First Nagorno-Karabakh War. In different positions, he regulated the military operations in the war area until 1994, when a ceasefire was reached ending the war with Armenian forces controlling almost all of Nagorno-Karabakh and seven surrounding districts.

In the post-war years, Sargsyan tightened his grip on the Armed Forces of Armenia, establishing himself as a virtual strongman. After strongly supporting Ter-Petrosyan to retain power in 1996, he forced the president out of office in 1998 due to the latter's support for concessions in the Nagorno-Karabakh settlement negotiations, and helped Prime Minister Robert Kocharyan to be elected president. After his relations with Kocharyan deteriorated, Sargsyan merged the influential war veterans group Yerkrapah into the Republican Party and joined forces with Armenia's ex-communist leader Karen Demirchyan. In the May 1999 elections, their reform-minded alliance secured a comfortable majority in the National Assembly. Sargsyan became prime minister, emerging as the de facto decision-maker in Armenia with effective control of the military and the legislature.

Sargsyan, along with Karen Demirchyan and six others, were killed in the Armenian parliament shooting on 27 October 1999. The perpetrators were sentenced to life in prison. However, the distrust toward the trial process gave birth to a number of conspiracy theories. Some experts and politicians argue that their assassination was masterminded by Kocharyan and National Security Minister Serzh Sargsyan. Others have suspected the possible involvement of foreign powers in the shooting.

Despite his mixed legacy, Sargsyan is now widely recognized as a national hero across the political spectrum and by the public. Given the honorific Sparapet, he made significant contributions to the establishment of Armenia as independent state and ensuring its security as the founder of the Armenian Army. He has also been criticized by human rights organizations for being undemocratic, especially for his role in elections. Sargsyan was awarded the highest titles of Armenia and Nagorno-Karabakh—National Hero of Armenia and Hero of Artsakh.

== Early life and career ==
Vazgen Zaveni Sargsyan was born in Ararat village, Soviet Armenia, near the Turkish border, on 5 March 1959, to Greta and Zaven Sargsyan. His ancestors had moved to Ararat from Maku, northern Iran, following the Russo-Persian War of 1826–28. After finishing secondary school in his village, he attended the Yerevan Institute of Physical Culture from 1976 to 1979. He worked as a physical education teacher at the secondary school in Ararat from 1979 to 1983. Therefore, he was exempt from conscription in the Soviet army. From 1983 to 1986, he was the Young Communist League (Komsomol) leader at the Ararat Cement Factory.

An amateur writer, Sargsyan developed a literary and active social life. He wrote his first novel in 1980, and became a member of the Writers Union of Armenia in 1985. From 1986 to 1989, he headed the publicity department of the Garun («Գարուն», "Spring") literary monthly in Yerevan. In 1986, his first book, Hatsi pordzutyun («Հացի փորձություն», Bread temptation), was published, for which he was awarded by the Armenian Komsomol. A number of his works were published in journals. However, his literary career did not last long and ended in the late 1980s.

== Nagorno-Karabakh conflict ==
=== Early stages and independence of Armenia ===
The relative democratization of the Soviet regime under Mikhail Gorbachev's glasnost and perestroika policies since the mid-1980s gave rise to nationalism in the republics of the Soviet Union. In Armenia, the Karabakh movement gained widespread public support. Armenians demanded the Soviet authorities unify the mostly Armenian-populated Nagorno-Karabakh Autonomous Oblast (NKAO) of Azerbaijan with Armenia. In February 1988, the NKAO regional legislature requested the transfer of the region from the jurisdiction of Azerbaijan SSR to Armenian SSR, but it was rejected by the Politburo. Tensions between Armenians and Azerbaijanis further escalated with the pogrom in Sumgait. With both groups arming themselves, clashes became frequent, especially in the disputed Nagorno-Karabakh and the border areas of the two Soviet republics. In 1989 and 1990, Sargsyan took the command of Armenian volunteer groups fighting near Yeraskh, on the Armenian-Azerbaijani (Nakhchivan) border, not far from his hometown.

By January 1990, he became part of the leadership of the Pan-Armenian National Movement. Sargsyan was elected to the Armenian parliament (the Supreme Council) in the May 1990 election. He served as the head of the Supreme Council Commission on Defense and Internal Affairs until December 1991. With his initiative, the Special Regiment was established in September 1990. Composed of 26 platoons and a total of 2,300 men, it was the first formal Armenian military unit independent from Moscow. It became the main base of the Armenian army in the following years.

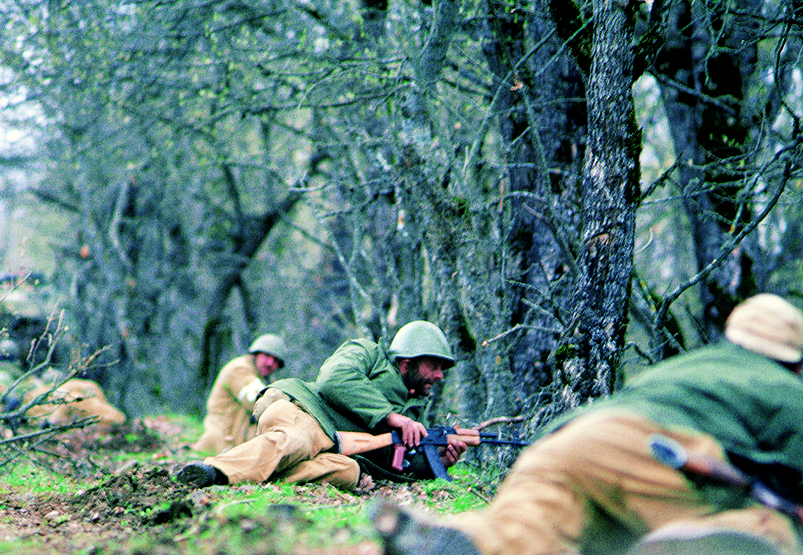
Armenian soldiers in Karabakh, early 1990s.

By 1991, most Armenians from Azerbaijan and Azerbaijanis from Armenia were forced to move to their respective countries, as remaining in their homes became nearly impossible. Although Armenia had proclaimed its independence from the Soviet Union on 23 August 1990, it was not until on 21 September 1991, a month after the failed August Coup in Moscow, when the overwhelming majority of Armenians voted for independence in a nationwide referendum. Levon Ter-Petrosyan, the leader of the Karabakh Committee and the head of the Supreme Council since 1990, was elected president of Armenia in October.

=== Active military involvement ===
Due to the fact that Sargsyan was popular among Armenian volunteer units and army officers, he was appointed the first defense minister of independent Armenia by President Ter-Petrosyan in December 1991. On 28 January 1992, the Armenian government passed the historical decree "On the Ministry of Defense of the Republic of Armenia," which formally created the Armed Forces of Armenia. With the rise of hostilities in Nagorno-Karabakh, in March 1992, Sargsyan announced that Armenia needed a 30,000-strong army for maintaining security. On 9 May 1992, the Armenian forces recorded their first major military success in Nagorno-Karabakh with the capture of Shushi. Another significant victory for the Armenian forces was recorded weeks later with the capture of Lachin, which connects Armenia proper with Nagorno-Karabakh.

In summer 1992, the situation turned critical for the Armenian forces following the launch of Operation Goranboy, during which Azerbaijan took control of northern half of Nagorno-Karabakh. On 15 August 1992, Sargsyan called on Armenian men to gather and form a volunteer unit to fight against the advancing Azerbaijani forces in the northern parts of Nagorno-Karabakh. In a televised speech he stated:

If 10–15 men from every district of Armenia come together, we can form a battalion of 500. This battalion must fight in the most dangerous areas, where the chance of survival is 50–50. Together we will go fight in the most difficult parts and we will win. Because, in reality, nothing has changed, the enemy is the same enemy, which was escaping and we are the same. It's just that we have lost the faith in our power. Now we need another attack and we must do it with the old guys to stimulate others in the army. If the day after tomorrow we will be able to establish a battalion of 500 volunteers, then we will fight and we will win."

The battalion Sargsyan called for, named Artsiv mahapartner («Արծիվ մահապարտներ», 'Eagles Sentenced to Death'), was formed on 30 August 1992. Under the command of Major-General Astvatsatur Petrosyan, it defeated the Azerbaijani forces near the Gandzasar monastery and Chldran village in Martakert Province, on 31 August and 1 September 1992, respectively. According to the Armenian Defense Ministry, the battalion's activity stopped the advancement of the Azerbaijani forces and turned the course of the war in favor of the Armenian side in the part of the region.

==== Armenian military victory ====
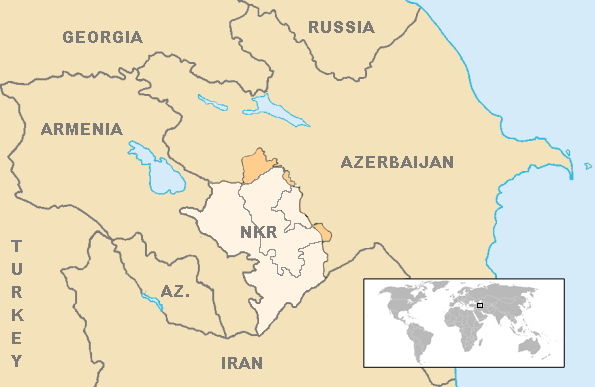
The 1994 ceasefire ended the First Nagorno-Karabakh War with the Armenian forces establishing de facto control on the disputed area

Between October 1992 and March 1993, Sargsyan served as the Presidential Adviser on Defence Affairs and the Presidential Envoy to Border Regions of Armenia. Subsequently, he was appointed the State Minister on Defence, Security and Internal Affairs. In these positions, Sargsyan had a major role in the advance of the Armenian army. With other key commanders, he regulated the operations to the Armenian forces in Nagorno-Karabakh. He was particularly active in unifying the various semi-independent detachments active in the war zone. Political chaos in Azerbaijan and the demoralization of the Azerbaijani army resulted in the Armenian forces taking control over the territories outside of the original Soviet-drawn borders of Nagorno-Karabakh. In 1993, Sargsyan founded and led Yerkrapah, a union of 5,000 war veterans, that had a great influence in Armenia's domestic politics in the post-war years and became the main base for Vazgen Sargsyan to rise in power.

In early April 1993, the Armenian forces captured Kelbajar, a city outside the originally contested areas, causing international attention to the conflict. Turkey closed its border with Armenia, while the United Nations passed a resolution condemning the act. In the summer of 1993, Armenian forces gained more territories and, by August controlled Fizuli, Jebrail, and Zangelan. By early 1994, both countries were devastated by the war. On 5 May, the Bishkek Protocol was signed by the heads of the parliaments of Nagorno-Karabakh, Armenia and Azerbaijan. The Nagorno-Karabakh Republic, backed by Armenia, established de facto control of these lands. Nagorno-Karabakh (also known as Artsakh to Armenians) remains internationally unrecognized and a de jure part of Azerbaijan. However, it is in de facto unified with Armenia.

== Minister of Defence and president change ==
Sargsyan was appointed Minister of Defence by Ter-Petrosyan on 26 July 1995, during the restructuring of government ministries. He remained in that position for almost four years. The Armenian army was highly regarded by experts with Armenia being described as the only former Soviet state that "managed to build a combat-capable army from scratch" and was "comparable in efficiency to the Soviet Army". According to Thomas de Waal, the army was "the most powerful institution" in Armenia under him. Sargsyan is credited with substantially professionalizing the Armenian army.

Sargsyan showed strong confidence in the army and stated in 1997 that its strength has doubled in the past two years. In the same year, in response to Azerbaijani President Heydar Aliyev's statements that Azerbaijan was "ready to solve the Karabakh problem by force," Sargsyan replied, "Let him do it. We are ready." Sargsyan's term as Minister of Defence was marked by cooperation with Russia and Greece. Sargsyan had "close connections" with the Russian military elite, especially Defense Minister Pavel Grachev. According to the Jamestown Foundation, he pursued a military diplomacy with Greece, Cyprus, Syria, Iran and Bulgaria for a pro-Russian alliance.

=== A 'power minister': 1995–96 elections ===
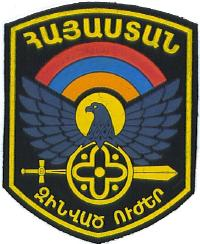
The Armenian Armed Forces headed by Vazgen Sargsyan significantly influenced the outcome of four elections from 1995 to 1999.

Sargsyan became a key figure in post-war Armenia due to the fact that he was indisputably supported by the army, the only well established institution in Armenia. He was described as an éminence grise of the Armenian politics, deciding many personnel appointments and dismissals. In the aftermath of the war, which was accompanied by a harsh economic crisis in Armenia, President Ter-Petrosyan became unpopular. His authoritarian rule, the banning of the major opposition party Armenian Revolutionary Federation in 1994 and the arrest of its leaders, made him highly dependent on the "power structures," which included the ministries of defence (headed by Sargsyan), interior (Vano Siradeghyan) and national security (Serzh Sargsyan). In July 1995, Vazgen Sargsyan helped Ter-Petrosyan's Pan-Armenian National Movement (PANM) win the parliamentary election and pass the constitutional referendum that gave the president more powers in appointing and dismissing key judicial and legislative officials. They were marred with major electoral violations.

Sargsyan's impact on Ter-Petrosyan's presidency became more evident during the 1996 presidential election and the subsequent developments. A few days before the election, Sargsyan stated his support for Ter-Petrosyan, stating that Armenia "will enter the 21st century victoriously and stable with Ter-Petrosyan [as president]". According to the Caucasian Regional Studies, Sargsyan "turned off the voters" from Ter-Petrosyan and caused "irritation and antipathy" in 28.6% of the people according to a poll. The election, held on 22 September, was largely criticized by observation and monitoring organizations, that found "serious violations of the election law".

Official results, which recorded Ter-Petrosyan's victory in the first round with just above 50% of the total vote in his favor, were denounced by opposition candidate Vazgen Manukyan who had officially received 41% of the vote. Manukyan began demonstrations claiming electoral fraud by Ter-Petrosyan's supporters. The protests culminated on 25 September, when Manukyan led thousands of his supporters to the parliament building on Baghramyan Avenue, where the Electoral Commission was located at the time. Later during the day, the protesters broke the fence surrounding the parliament and entered the building. They beat up the parliament speaker Babken Ararktsyan and vice-speaker Ara Sahakyan. In response, Vazgen Sargsyan stated that "even if they [the opposition] win 100 percent of the votes, neither the Army nor the National Security and Interior Ministry would recognize such political leaders." He was later criticized by human rights organizations for this statement. State security forces, tanks and troops were deployed in Yerevan to restore order and to enforce the ban on rallies and demonstrations on 26 September. Sargsyan and National Security Minister Serzh Sargsyan announced that their respective agencies had prevented an attempted coup d'état.

According to Astourian, in the crackdown Vazgen Sargsyan "intervened with an armed detachment and ordered the soldiers and the police to shoot at the legs of the demonstrators. Sargsian himself actually participated in the shooting." According to Freedom House, Sargsyan was allegedly involved in beating and seriously injuring Ruben (Rubik) Hakobyan, an MP from the Armenian Revolutionary Federation (ARF), after he was arrested during the demonstrations.

=== Leadership split: Ter-Petrosyan's resignation ===
In 1997, the OSCE Minsk Group, co-chaired by Russia, the United States and France, pressured Armenia and Azerbaijan to agree on the final status of Nagorno-Karabakh. In September, Ter-Petrosyan stated his support of the "step-by-step" proposal, which included the return of the territories outside the NKAO borders. Ter-Petrosyan argued the normalization of relations with Azerbaijan and, therefore, the opening of the border with Turkey was the only way to significantly improve Armenia's economy. After the plan was publicized, he came up against strong opposition. The issue was "important to the Armenians because of historical and psychological factors. After having been losing territories for centuries, the Armenians are reluctant to 'lose' Karabakh now that they have won a war against Azerbaijan." According to political scientist Vicken Cheterian, "By calling for major concessions on Karabakh, Ter-Petrosyan was antagonizing the last forces that supported his rule, the army and the Karabakh elite, at a time when his popularity within the Armenian society was at its lowest."

The Nagorno-Karabakh Republic leadership, the Armenian intelligentsia and the diaspora, the opposition also expressed their opposition to the president’'s support for the proposed settlement plan. Vazgen Sargsyan, who quickly denounced the proposal, became the de facto leader of the opposing group within the government. He was joined by the two Karabakh Armenians in the government: Prime Minister Robert Kocharyan and Interior and National Security Minister Serzh Sargsyan. These three politicians were referred to as "hardliners" in the Western media for their perceived nationalistic stance. They argued that "Armenia should try to improve its economic performance," while Ter-Petrosyan insisted that Armenia "could only achieve marginal improvements insufficient to address the fear of relative decline and economic exclusion". The Kocharyan cabinet, where Vazgen Sargsyan was a leading figure, called for a "package" deal, "involving a single framework accord on all contentious issues". On 21 October 1997, ten members of the Republic bloc in the parliament left the faction and shifted their support to Vazgen Sargsyan. Ter-Petrosyan's bloc in the parliament was left with a majority of two seats. Despite the great public and political opposition, the Pan-Armenian National Movement voted in favor of Ter-Petrosyan's foreign policy.

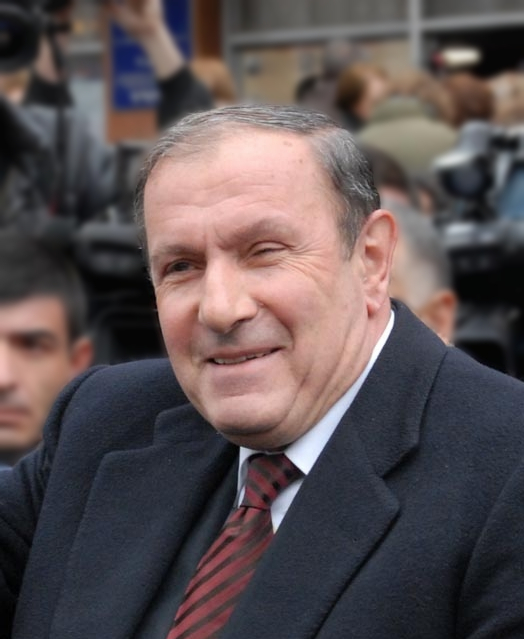
Vazgen Sargsyan and other "hard-liners" forced President Levon Ter-Petrosyan to resign in 1998.

During the National Security Council meeting on 7–8 January 1998 it became clear that Ter-Petrosyan did not have enough support to continue his reign as president. On 23 January 1998, during the peak of the crisis, Vazgen Sargsyan declared his unconditional support to Robert Kocharyan, and blamed the Pan-Armenian National Movement for trying to destabilize Armenia. Sargsyan also guaranteed that the Armenian army "will not intervene in the political struggle".

Ter-Petrosyan announced his resignation on 3 February 1998. According to Michael P. Croissant, it was Vazgen Sargsyan who "played ultimately the principal role in inducting the president's resignation". In his resignation statement, Ter-Petrosyan referred to Vazgen Sargsyan, Robert Kocharyan and Serzh Sargsyan as "the well known body of power". He cited the threat of destabilization of the country as the reason of his resignation. Ter-Petrosyan's resignation was followed by the resignation of National Assembly speaker Babken Ararktsyan, his two deputies, Mayor of Yerevan Vano Siradeghyan, Foreign Affairs Minister Alexander Arzoumanian and others. A significant change occurred in the National Assembly. Dozens of members of the parliamentary faction called the Republican Bloc (mostly made up of Ter-Petrosyan's Pan-Armenian National Movement) joined Vazgen Sargsyan's Yerkrapah bloc, making it the largest parliamentary bloc, with 69 members compared to only 56 for the Republic.

After Ter-Petrosyan's resignation, Prime Minister Kocharyan became acting president. On 5 February 1998, Sargsyan denied the claims of a coup d'état and said that Ter-Petrosyan's resignation was "rather sad but natural". Sargsyan claimed that the president's move surprised him and that he had "been seeking common grounds with the president for the past three months". He added, "the only step I achieved on the Karabakh issue was the suggestion that the situation be frozen." Almost a year after Ter-Petrosyan's resignation, Vazgen Sargsyan stated at the Republican Party convention that he "respects and appreciates" Ter-Petrosyan and described him as a "wise and a moral man and politician". Sargsyan insisted that the question of "political responsibility" was the main reason behind his resignation, and stated that if Ter-Petrosyan had decided not to resign, "no one could have removed him" and that Sargsyan would have resigned as defence minister instead. Commenting on the circumstances of his resignation in 2021, Ter-Petrosyan insisted that Vazgen Sargsyan and Kocharyan were "ready for civil war" if he did not resign.

=== 1998 election: Kocharyan as president ===
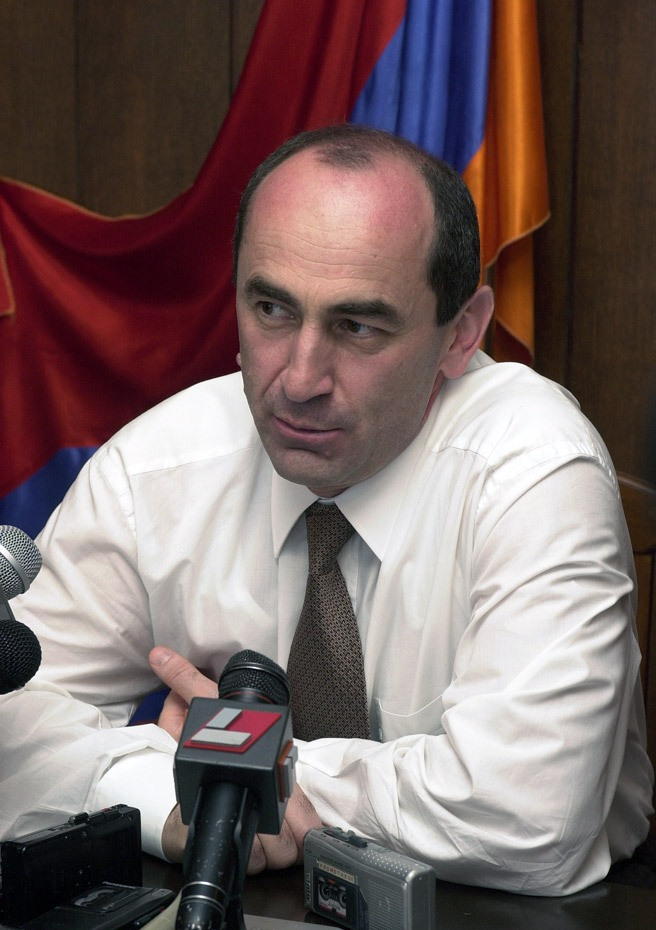
With the support of Vazgen Sargsyan, Prime Minister Robert Kocharyan was elected president in 1998.

Sargsyan (along with Interior Minister Serzh Sargsyan) openly supported Kocharyan and used his influence for his election in March. He called Kocharyan a "man of unity of word and action" and stated that his experience in Karabakh and Armenia "shows that he is capable of solving economic problems also". Kocharyan's main opponent was Karen Demirchyan, the leader of Soviet Armenia from 1974 to 1988. Sargsyan praised Kocharyan for being part of the "struggle of the Armenian people" and criticized Demirchyan for not being part of it.

No candidate gained more than half of the votes in the first round, while in the second round of the election, held on 30 March, Kocharyan won 58.9% of the vote. The British Helsinki Human Rights Group suggests that "ordinary Armenians turned to Robert Kocharian as someone untainted by mafia connections and the intrigues of Yerevan politics." The OSCE observation mission described the first round as "deeply flawed," while their final report stated that the mission found "serious flaws" and that the election did not meet the OSCE standards. Although Demirchyan didn't officially dispute the election results, he never accepted them and did not congratulate Kocharyan. After the election, however, Sargsyan suggested Kocharyan appoint Demirchyan prime minister to decrease the tensions in the political scene.

Even after becoming president, Kocharyan did not have any significant institutional support (e.g. a party, control of the army, a source of money) and remained "in a fundamental sense an outsider in Yerevan". Kocharyan had a more tough position on the Karabakh settlement issue than Ter-Petrosyan. He also urged the international community to recognize the Armenian genocide, something on which his predecessor did not place importance. In response, Turkey and Azerbaijan tightened their cooperation in isolating Armenia from regional projects. Kocharyan did not put pressure on the Nagorno-Karabakh leadership to concede territory to Azerbaijan. He was supported by the Armenian Revolutionary Federation, which was allowed to actively operate after Ter-Petrosyan's resignation a month before the election.

== Rise in power ==
"From the very beginning there was a wrong impression that Yerkrapah can do nothing–but fight, however—time has shown that Yerkrapah can not only perform feats on battlefields—but also have a say in peaceful development."

— Vazgen Sargsyan, May 1999

=== Politicization of Yerkrapah ===
By 1998 Vazgen Sargsyan became "the power behind the throne" as the Yerkrapah faction—made up of war veterans loyal to him—was the single largest faction in the Armenian parliament following Ter-Petrosyan's resignation in February 1998. Yerkrapah was merged with the Republican Party of Armenia—a minor party with an ideology similar to that of Yerkrapah—in summer 1998, taking the party's name and its legal status. Though Sargsyan was not the chairman of the Republican Party, he was considered its unofficial leader.

The relations between Sargsyan and Kocharyan deteriorated after the presidential election with Sargsyan "casting around for partners unconnected with or downright opposed to the president". Within several months three assassinations of top officials took place that spread rumors in Armenia that relations between Sargsyan and Kocharyan were "not normal". In August 1998 Armenia's Prosecutor-General Henrik Khachatryan, a close friend of Kocharyan, was murdered in his office "in murky circumstances". In December 1998 Deputy Minister of Defence Vahram Khorkhoruni was murdered "for equally mysterious motives", while in February 1999 Deputy Minister of the Interior Artsrun Margaryan was murdered. Vazgen Sargsyan and National Security and Interior Minister Serzh Sargsyan, Kocharyan's close ally, were "also perceived to be at odds".

=== Alliance with Demirchyan ===
It was initially announced that the Republican Party would go to the parliamentary election alone and would seek "qualitative majority" in the parliament, and that their goal was the fairness of the electoral process. Surprisingly for many, on 30 March 1999, Vazgen Sargsyan and the runner-up of the 1998 presidential election and Armenia's ex-communist leader Karen Demirchyan issued a joint announcement that they were forming an alliance between the People's Party of Armenia and the Republican Party. It came to be known as the Unity bloc (Miasnutyun dashink), often referred to as Miasnutyun. Vazgen Sargsyan claimed the bloc was a "genuine" alliance and that the two parties had come together to lead Armenia "from a turning point to progress". When asked about the reasons why he joined Demirchyan, Sargsyan said that, "there is no other way out." According to the U.S. Helsinki Commission, Sargsyan "obviously concluded it was better to have the popular Demirchyan as an ally than an opponent," and that "in forming Unity bloc, Sargsyan and Demirchyan overcame whatever ideological differences they may have had, and said they had joined forces to overcome the difficult problems facing Armenia while promoting tolerance in the country's political life." In analyst Richard Giragosian's words, the bloc was "an odd mix," however he admitted that it "effectively marginalized the electoral threat" of other parties. Sociologist Levon Baghdasaryan described it as "unification of the new and old nomenklaturas". The British Helsinki Human Rights Group wrote of the Unity bloc that it "aimed to appeal to the electorate by being all things to all men". The ODIHR suggested that the "alliance was not only created for electoral purposes, but that a strategic political agreement had been reached while overcoming ideological differences".

=== 1999 parliamentary election ===
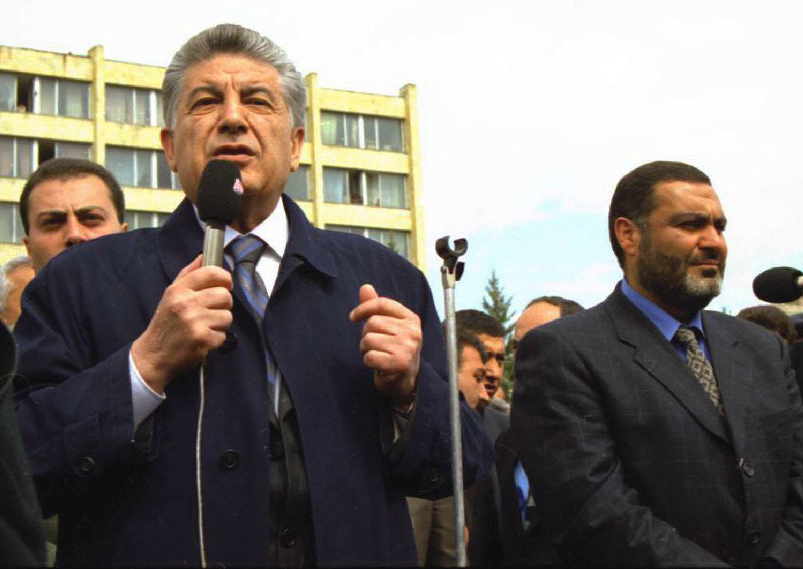
Karen Demirchyan (left) and Vazgen Sargsyan (right) during the election campaign of the Unity bloc in May 1999.

During the campaign, Sargsyan pledged that he would spare no effort to make sure the elections were free and fair. Sargsyan and Demirchyan put the emphasis of their campaign on the economy and the improvement of the life of ordinary Armenians. Talking about Yerkrapah—now politically transformed into the Republican Party—Sargsyan said he was confident "that the people that gained victory on the battlefield will also gain victory in economy". He expressed his optimism saying that they were sure that they "will jointly change something and find the right course". The Unity bloc "called broadly for a democratic society, rule of law, economic reforms and a market economy, with the state also creating conditions for the normal functioning of state enterprises and ensuring decent living standards for all". Throughout the campaign, the Unity bloc was widely considered the favorite of the election. Opposition newspaper Hayots ashkharh suggested that most other political parties in Armenia were gravitating towards the opposite pole, around Kocharyan, National Security & Interior Minister Serzh Sargsyan, and the leadership of the Nagorno-Karabakh Republic.

The parliamentary election took place on 30 May 1999, just two months after Sargsyan's and Demirchyan's announcement about their decision to form an alliance. The Unity bloc won over 41.5% of the popular vote, and took 62 of the 131 seats in the National Assembly. The alliance established an effective majority with cooperating with a group of 25 independent and officially non-affiliated members of the parliament, sympathetic to the Sargsyan-Demirchyan coalition. The electoral process "generally showed an improvement over the [previous] flawed elections, but ODIHR said they were "not an adequate basis for comparison". ODIHR's final report described the election as "a step towards compliance with OSCE Commitments" and claimed that, along with improvements to the electoral framework and the political environment, serious issues remained. The Council of Europe also suggested "considerable improvement" from the past elections. The National Democratic Institute report was more critical, saying it "failed to meet international standards" and that it proved to be the continuation of the flawed 1995 parliamentary elections, differing only in "the methods and types of manipulation".

== Prime minister ==
At the Republican Party convention in January 1999. Sargsyan stated his desire in remaining in the position of Minister of Defence. After the election speculations arose about Sargsyan wanting to combine the positions of defence minister and prime minister, however, this was impossible according to the Armenian constitution. On 11 June 1999 he became Prime Minister of Armenia, while Unity bloc co-chairman Karen Demirchyan was elected speaker of the National Assembly.

Many experts suggest that Sargsyan as prime minister was the most powerful politician in Armenia, while others suggest that he had become Armenia's strongest politician long before that. According to Mark Grigorian, his "activities had begun to overshadow" Kocharyan. Despite Kocharyan's formal welcome of their alliance, the president was "effectively weakened" and "was being sidelined". Some political analysts suggested that the Sargsyan-Demirchyan alliance "ultimately would bring about the resignation of Kocharyan". Vazgen Manukyan stated that Kocharyan "would end up like the "Queen of England". Despite no longer being the minister of defence, Vazgen Sargsyan remained the de facto leader of the army, as a close ally, Vagharshak Harutiunyan, replaced him.

According to Styopa Safaryan, an analyst and former member of the Armenian parliament, despite his mixed legacy, under Vazgen Sargsyan Armenia became increasingly independent.

"Today the economic development of Armenia is as important as victory in the war was yesterday. Our battle has moved from the field of blood and heroism, to the economic field."

— Vazgen Sargsyan, Armenia-Diaspora Conference, 23 September 1999

=== Economic policy ===
At the time of Sargsyan's Prime Ministry, Armenia had not yet recovered from the economic effects of the dissolution of the Soviet Union and the energy crisis in Armenia during the Nagorno-Karabakh War. One of the major issues Sargsyan faces was mass emigration from Armenia, which started at the period of the decline of the Soviet regime. The 1998 Russian financial crisis worsened the situation, and showed a decline in human development.

In his first address to the parliament as prime minister on 18 June, Sargsyan described Armenia's economic situation as "grave." The budget revenues were almost 20% lower than the government had planned, because of the low level of tax collection and the high level of corruption in the Armenian economy. Although Sargsyan criticized the post-Soviet privatization by the Ter-Petrosyan government, he admitted Armenia had no alternative, and that his government had an enormous amount of work to do. In his speech on 28 July, Sargsyan described the economic situation in Armenia as "extremely difficult, but not hopeless". According to him, the first half of 1999 saw $61 million less in the budged revenues than planned by the Darbinyan government. He said that tax evasion played a role in the budget deficit.

Despite being criticized by the opposition, especially the National Democratic Union, the Unity bloc voted in favor (96 of the 131 MPs) of the austerity measures of the Sargsyan cabinet on 28 August, allowing Armenia to take loans from the World Bank and the International Monetary Fund (IMF). The World Bank alone had loaned almost $0.5 billion to Armenia since 1992 to finance the budget deficits. The Sargsyan cabinet wanted to diversify $32 million in the budget funds to be able to repay the internal debts. For this purpose, the excise tax was raised on cigarettes by 200% and on gasoline by 45%, seriously hitting the middle class. Sargsyan described these as "painful but right steps" for getting the necessary amount of money from the foreign lenders. He pledged a "tougher crackdown on the shadow economy and more efficient governance". National Assembly Speaker Karen Demirchyan called for a greater role of the state in the economy to ensure stability, while President Kocharyan was mostly uninvolved in these developments.

=== Notable events ===
During his Prime Ministry, Sargsyan helped to organize three major events. On 28 August 1999, the first Pan-Armenian Games began in Yerevan. Over 1,400 Armenian athletes from 23 countries participated in the games. The closing ceremony took place in the Yerevan Sports and Concerts Complex on 5 September, with President Robert Kocharyan and Vazgen Sargsyan in attendance. Just after the Games, which involved thousands of diaspora Armenian youth, the preparations for the eighth anniversary of Armenia's independence began.

On 21 September, the anniversary of the day in 1991 when Armenians voted in favor of leaving the Soviet Union in a referendum, a military parade was held in Yerevan's Republic Square. Vazgen Sargsyan "was visibly the most excited of the government leaders standing on a specially built pedestal". In a short briefing after the parade, Sargsyan enthusiastically stated that he had "touched almost every piece of hardware you've just seen" and continued that he "just wanted to show it" to the Armenian people.

During the next two days, on 22 and 23 September 1999, the first Armenia-Diaspora Conference was held in Yerevan. The conference brought together the Armenian political elite and many diaspora organizations, political parties, religious leaders, writers and over 1,200 representatives of Armenian communities from 53 countries, an unprecedented number. Vazgen Sargsyan opened the second day of the conference with his speech-report about the economic and social situation in Armenia. The conference was closed by Sargsyan.

== Death ==
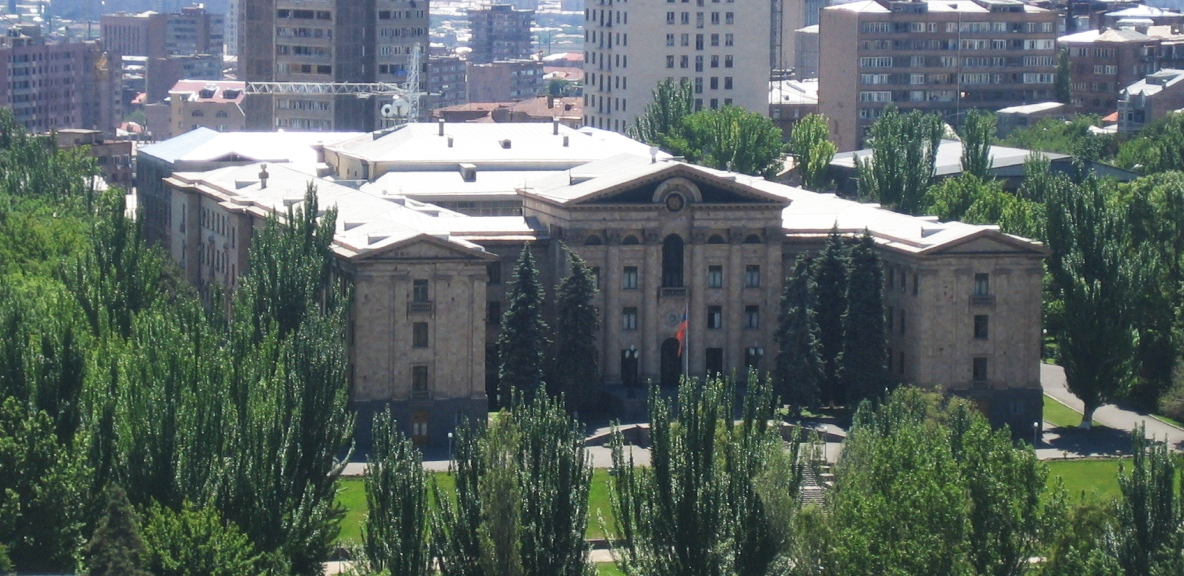
The building of the National Assembly of Armenia

On 27 October 1999, at around 5:15 pm, five assailants—Nairi Hunanyan, his brother Karen, their uncle Vram and two others—armed with Kalashnikov rifles hidden under long coats, broke into the National Assembly building in Yerevan, while the government was holding a question-and-answer session. They shot and killed Sargsyan, National Assembly Speaker Karen Demirchyan, Deputy National Assembly Speakers Yuri Bakhshyan and Ruben Miroyan, Minister of Urgent Affairs Leonard Petrosyan, and Parliament Members Henrik Abrahamyan, Armenak Armenakyan and Mikayel Kotanyan. The gunmen injured at least 30 people in the parliament. The group claimed they were carrying out a coup d'état. They described their act as "patriotic" and "needed for the nation to regain its senses". They said they wanted to "punish the authorities for what they do to the nation" and described the government as profiteers "sucking the blood of the people". They claimed Armenia was in a "catastrophic situation" and that "corrupt officials" were not doing anything to provide the way out. Vazgen Sargsyan was the main target of the group and the other deaths were said to be unintended. According to reporters who witnessed the shooting, the men went up to Sargsyan and said, "Enough of drinking our blood," to which Sargsyan calmly responded, "Everything is being done for you and the future of your children." Vazgen Sargsyan was hit several times. Anna Israelyan, an eyewitness journalist, stated that "the first shots were fired directly at Vazgen Sargsyan at a distance of one to two meters" and, in her words, "it was impossible that he would have survived." Sargsyan's body was taken out of the parliament building on the evening of 27 October.

With policemen, army troops, armed with APCs surrounding the building. President Kocharyan gave a speech on TV, announcing that the situation was under control. The gunmen released the hostages after overnight negotiations with President Kocharyan and gave themselves up on the morning of 28 October, after a standoff that lasted 17–18 hours.

=== Funeral ===
On 28 October, President Kocharyan declared a three-day mourning period. The state funeral ceremony for the victims of the parliament shooting took place from 30 to 31 October 1999. The bodies of the victims, including Vazgen Sargsyan, were placed inside the Yerevan Opera Theater. A number of high-ranking officials from some 30 countries, including Russian prime minister Vladimir Putin and the Georgian president Eduard Shevardnadze, attended the funeral. Karekin II, the Catholicos of All Armenians and Aram I, the Catholicos of the Holy See of Cilicia gave prayers.

=== Investigation and conspiracy theories ===
The five men were charged with terrorism aimed at undermining authority on 29 October. The investigation was led by Gagik Jhangiryan, the chief military prosecutor of Armenia, who claimed his team was looking for the masterminds of the shooting even after the trial had begun. According to Jhangiryan, the investigating team considered more than a dozen theories. By January 2000, Jhangiryan's investigators considered the connection of Kocharyan and his circle to the parliament shooting. Several figures close to Kocharyan were arrested, including Aleksan Harutiunyan, the deputy presidential adviser, and Harutiun Harutiunyan, the deputy director of the Public Television of Armenia, but they were released by the summer of that year. Eventually, Jhangiryan failed to find evidence linking Kocharyan to the shooting. The trial began in February 2001 and eventually, the five main perpetrators of the shooting (Nairi Hunanyan, his younger brother Karen Hunanyan, their uncle Vram Galstyan, Derenik Ejanyan and Eduard Grigoryan) were sentenced to life in prison on 2 December 2003.

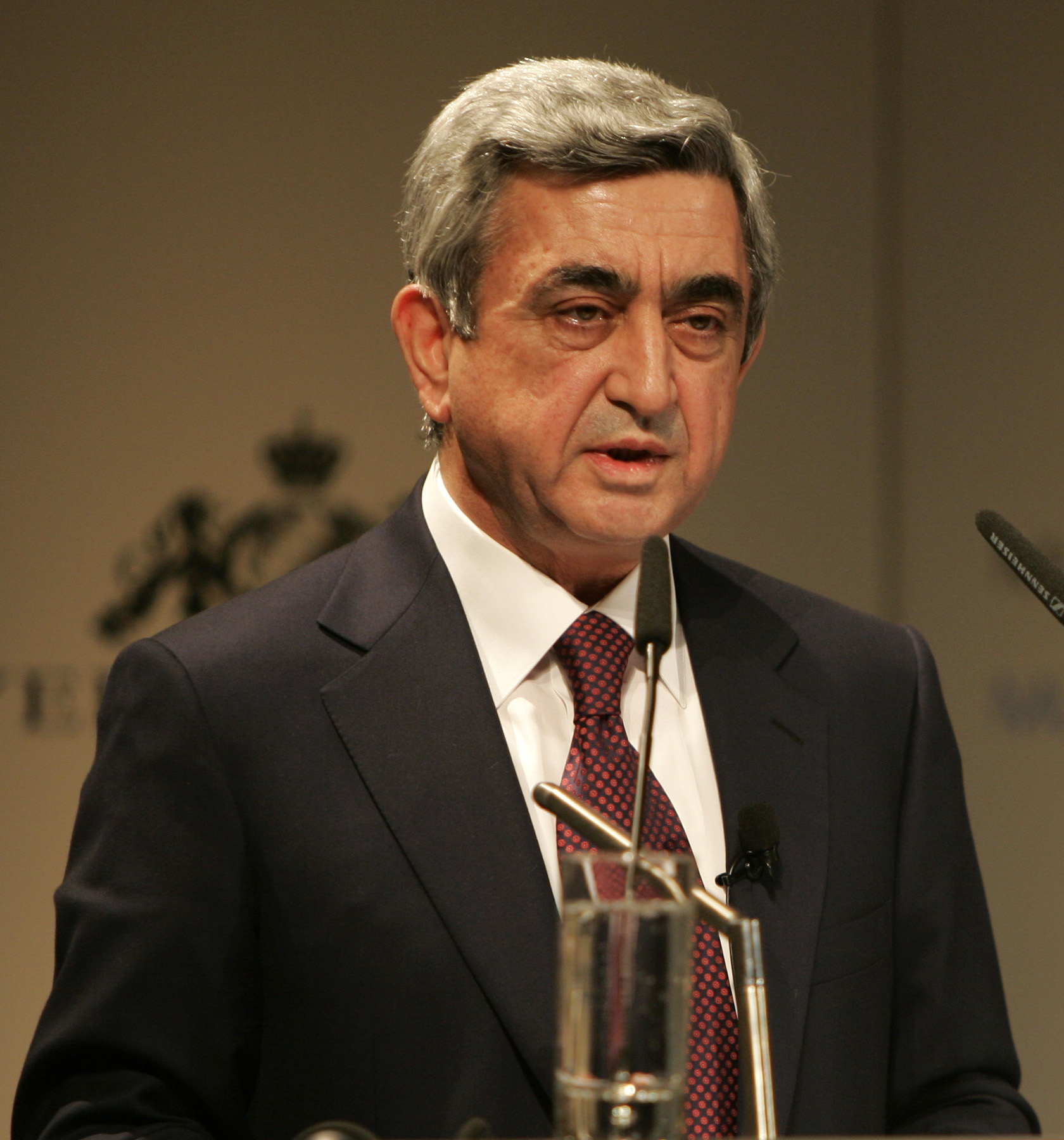
Armenia's former president Serzh Sargsyan was the National Security Minister at the time of the shooting.

A number of conspiracy theories developed about possible motives and architects behind the attack. Stepan Demirchyan, Karen Demirchyan's son, stated in 2009 that "nothing was done by the authorities to prevent that crime and, conversely, everything was done to cover up the crime." In March 2013, Vazgen Sargsyan's younger brother Aram stated he had many questions for both governments of Robert Kocharyan and Serzh Sargsyan. He claimed the judicial process of 27 October had "deepened the public distrust in the authorities... [as] many questions remain unanswered today". According to him, the full disclosure of the shooting is "vital" for Armenia. Sargsyan insisted that he "never accused this or the former authorities of being responsible for 27 October. I have accused them of not fully disclosing the 27 October event." In an April 2013 interview, Karen Demirchyan's widow, Rita, suggested the shooting was ordered from outside Armenia and was not an attempt at a coup, but rather an assassination.

Although the investigation did not find any considerable evidence linking Kocharyan to the Hunanyan group, many Armenian politicians and analysts believe that President Robert Kocharyan and National Security Minister Serzh Sargsyan were behind the assassination of Vazgen Sargsyan and other leading politicians. Former mayor of Yerevan Albert Bazeyan stated in 2002 that "We have come to the conclusion that the crime was aimed at making Robert Kocharian's power unlimited and uncontrolled. By physically eliminating Karen Demirchyan and Vazgen Sargsyan, its organizers wanted to create prerequisites for Kocharyan's victory in the future presidential elections." Levon Ter-Petrosyan accused Kocharyan and Serzh Sargsyan and their "criminal-oligarchic" system of being the real perpetrators of the parliament shooting. Nairi Hunanyan, the leader of the armed group, was a former member of the Armenian Revolutionary Federation (ARF, Dashnaktsutyun). According to the ARF, Hunanyan was expelled from the party in 1992 for misconduct and had not been in any association with the ARF since then. Some speculations have been made about the involvement of the ARF in the shootings. In 2000, Ashot Manucharyan stated he was worried that "a number of Dashnaktsutyun party leaders are acting in the interest of the American foreign policy."

==== Allegations of foreign involvement ====
Some analysts have suggested that foreign powers, including Russia, may have been behind the shooting. They pointed out the fact that Armenia and Azerbaijan were close in signing some kind of an agreement at the OSCE 1999 Istanbul summit over Karabakh, something not in Russia's interest.

Russian secret service defector Alexander Litvinenko accused the Main Intelligence Directorate of the General Staff of the Armed Forces of the Russian Federation of having organised the Armenian parliament shooting, ostensibly to derail the peace process, which would have resolved the Nagorno-Karabakh conflict, but he offered no evidence to support the accusation. Russian and Armenian officials denied Litvinenko's claims.

The French-based Armenian political refugee and former Apostolic priest Artsruni Avetisysan (also known by his religious name Ter Girgor) gave an interview to Armenian media network A1plus, in which he claimed the Russian secret services were behind the 27 October 1999, shooting. He also claimed the shooting was perpetrated by Lieutenant General Vahan Shirkhanyan, the Deputy Minister of Defense from 1992 to 1999, and the National Security Minister Serzh Sargsyan. He insisted the shooting was assisted by the Russian secret services to bring the "Neo-Bolshevik criminal clan" of Serzh Sargsyan and Robert Kocharyan into power.

Others suggested that it was in the best interest of the West to remove Sargsyan and Demirchyan from the political scene, as they had close ties to Russia. Ashot Manucharyan, one of the leading members of the Karabakh Committee, the former Minister of Internal Affairs and Ter-Petrosyan's National Security Adviser and his close ally until 1993, stated in October 2000 that Armenian officials were warned by a foreign country about the shootings. He also declared that "Western special services" were involved in 27 October events. In Manucharyan's words, "the special services of the U.S. and France are acting to destroy Armenia and, in this context, they are much likely to be involved in the realization of the terrorist acts in Armenia." Manucharyan claimed the shooting was planned by Kocharyan to get rid of his two major rivals (Sargsyan and Demirchyan), who were against the Goble plan, involving territorial concessions to Azerbaijan.

=== Aftermath ===
Just after the shooting, the Interior and National Security Ministers Suren Abrahamyan and Serzh Sargsyan resigned as a result of pressure from the Defence Ministry, led by Sargsyan's ally, Vagharshak Harutiunyan at the time. From early June to late October 1999, the political system in Armenia was based on the Demirchyan-Sargsyan tandem, which controlled the military, the legislative and the executive branches. The assassinations disrupted the political balance in the country and the political arena of Armenia was left in disarray for months. The "de facto dual command" of Sargsyan and Demirchyan was transferred to President Robert Kocharyan. James R. Hughes claims that the so-called "Karabakh clan" (i.e. Robert Kocharyan and Serzh Sargsyan) was "kept in check" by Vazgen Sargsyan and his "military-security apparatus," while after the parliament shooting it came to be the sole influential group able to successfully take over the political scene in Armenia. Since the leaders of the Unity bloc were assassinated, the two parties in the alliance (the Republican Party of Armenia and the People's Party of Armenia) gradually ceased collaborating and by late 2000, the Unity bloc collapsed. Yerkrapah, the Republican Party, and the People's Party effectively lost their influence by 2001.

== Personal life and brothers ==
Sargsyan never married. According to Razmik Martirosyan, a friend and the Minister of Social Security from 1999 to 2003, Sargsyan promised in December 1987 that he would marry sometime before 8 March of the next year, but did not because the Karabakh movement started in February. In a 1997 interview, Sargsyan revealed that his favorite historical military figure was Charles de Gaulle. When asked about what kind of Armenia he would like to see in five years, he said "an independent, self-sufficient country with strong culture, school and army".

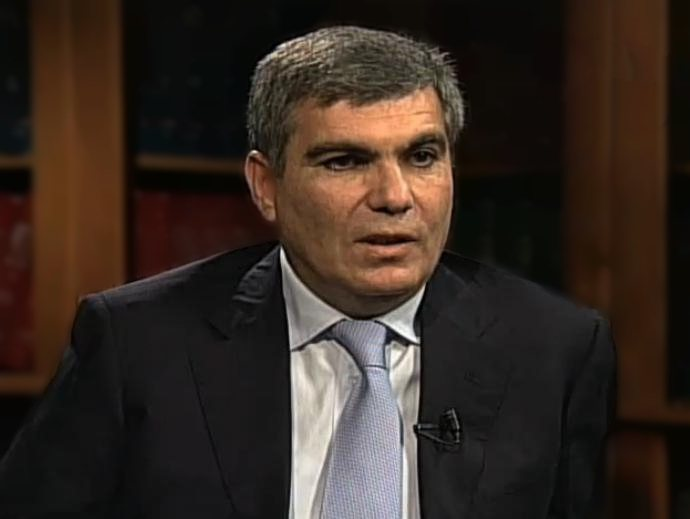
Aram Sargsyan, Vazgen Sargsyan's brother

Sargsyan had two younger brothers, Aram and Armen. Aram was appointed prime minister by President Kocharyan on 3 November 1999, a week after Vazgen Sargsyan's death, largely as a "political gesture". He admitted that Armenia has "no concept of state security" and that fact led to the assassination of his brother. Aram Sargsyan served in the position of the prime minister for only six months. He was dismissed by Kocharyan on 2 May 2000, due to "inability to work" with Sargsyan's cabinet. In his television statement, Kocharyan claimed that he relieved Aram Sargsyan to end the "disarray" in the Armenian leadership. Kocharyan blamed him for being involved in "political games".

Aram Sargsyan founded the Hanrapetutyun Party in April 2001, along with several influential Yerkrapah members, such as the former mayor of Yerevan Albert Bazeyan and former defence minister Vagharshak Harutyunyan. Its co-founder Bazeyan stated that the party is the "bearer of the political heritage of Vazgen Sargsian and will try to realize the programs aborted by the October 27 crime and its consequences". The party backed up Stepan Demirchyan against Kocharyan in 2003 and Levon Ter-Petrosyan against Serzh Sargsyan in the 2008 presidential elections. In a 2013 interview, Aram Sargsyan talked about the past 14 years after his brother's death:

If things were done as Vazgen Sargsyan wanted, I would not be in opposition and I would do everything I could to make his wishes come true. Today, I'm fighting for his wishes to be realized. His wishes were very simple. He wanted to see a strong Armenia. Vazgen was an optimist, and he spread hope, honesty, dedication, love for the fatherland. The president after Vazgen did the opposite. He only saw materialism and selfishness in people and encouraging those values he remained in power, thus polluting the country.

Vazgen Sargsyan's other brother, Armen, supported Serzh Sargsyan in the 2013 presidential election. On 5 March 2013, Aram Sargsyan was asked about his brother Armen's political stance, to which he responded, "I would very much like to ask Vazgen that question. I don't know what he would have answered. There are very few questions to which I don't know what Vazgen's answer would be. Unfortunately, our friends and relatives are not always the way we want them to be. I am not the first one, neither am I the last one; the history of the world is full of such examples starting from the Bible."

== Legacy and tribute ==
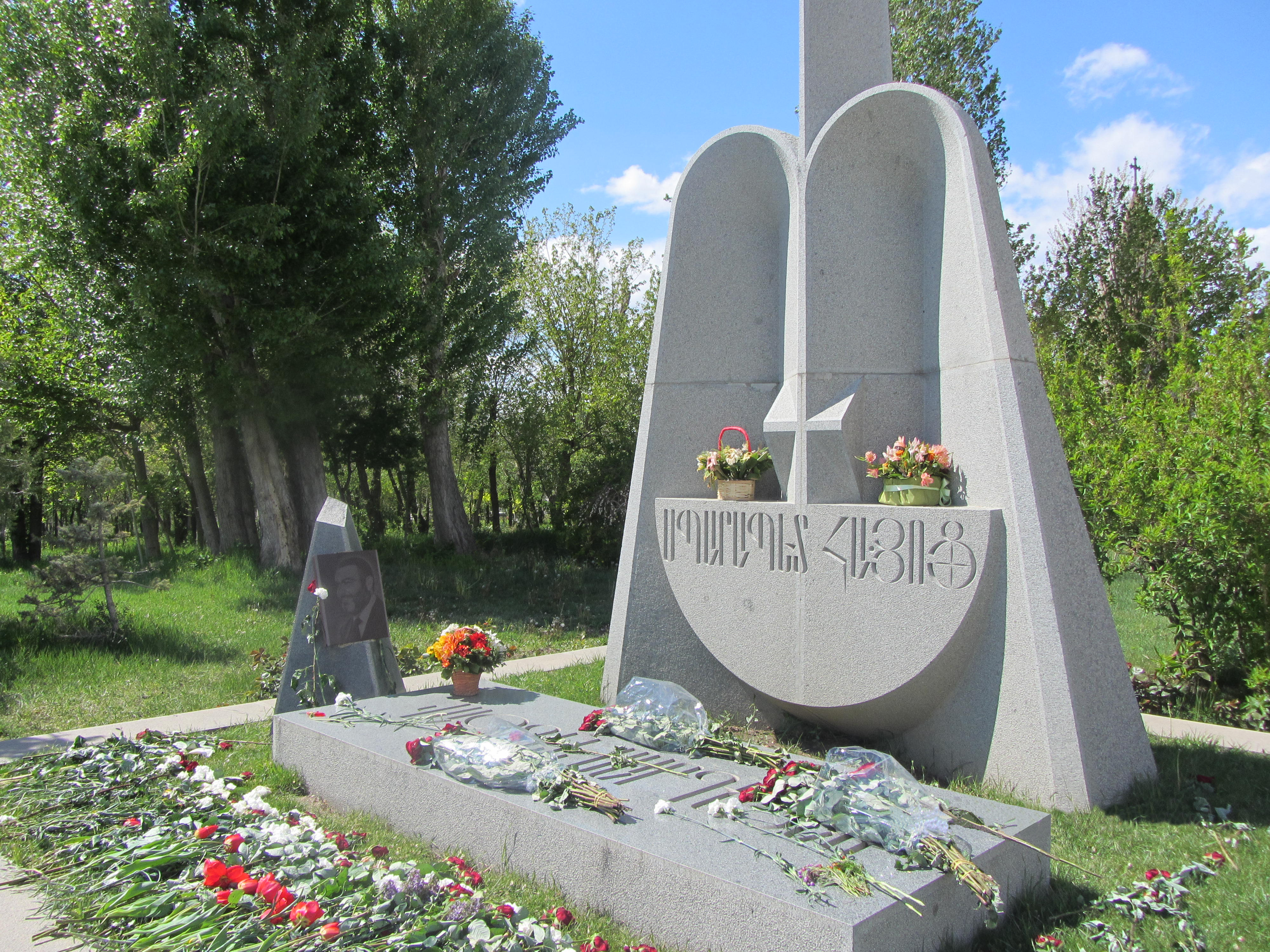
Vazgen Sargsyan's memorial in Yerablur

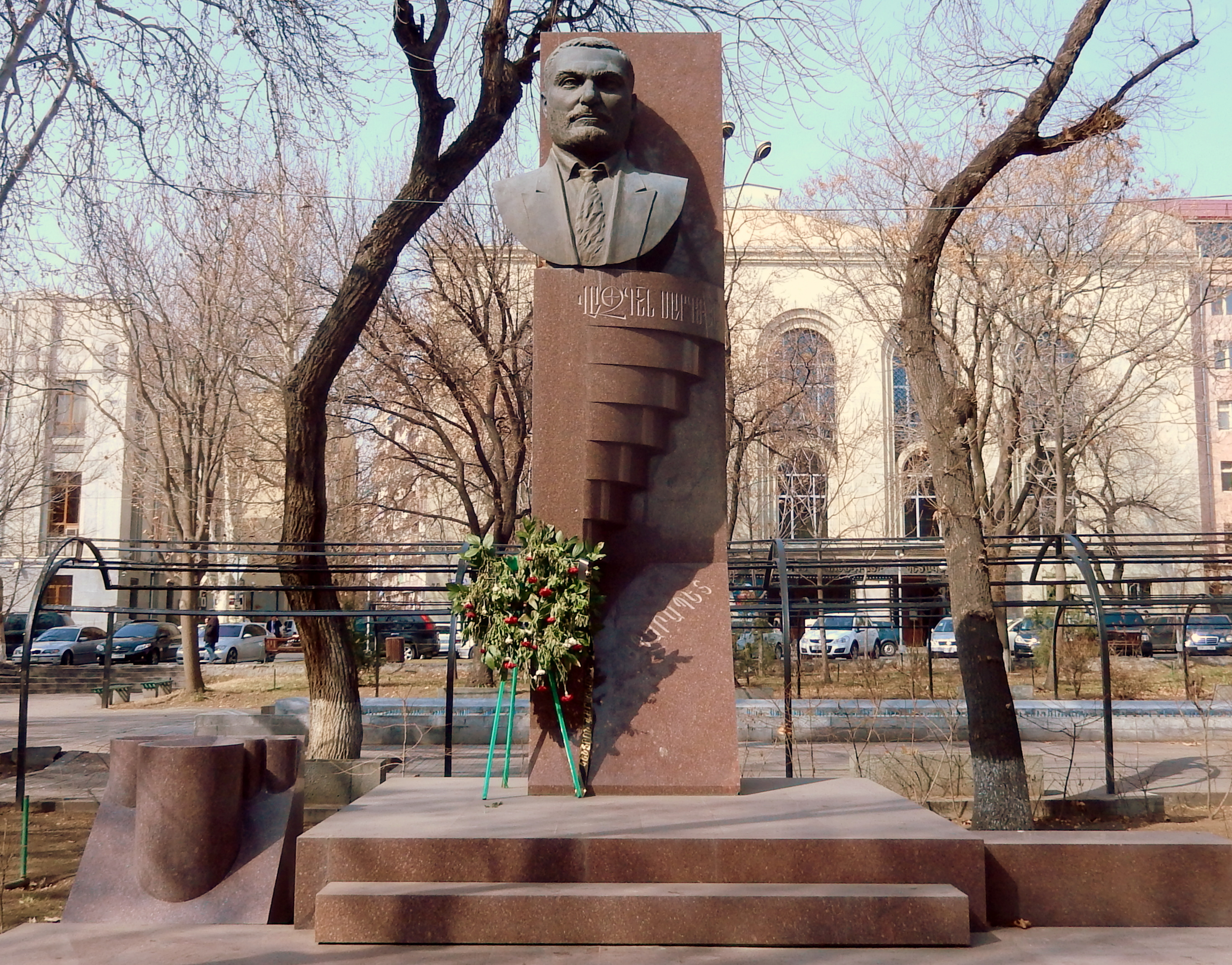
Statue of Sargsyan in Yerevan

Vazgen Sargsyan was awarded the title Hero of Artsakh, the highest award of the Nagorno-Karabakh Republic, in 1998. On 27 December 1999, two months after the parliament shooting, Sargsyan was posthumously given the title National Hero of Armenia. He widely is recognized as the founder of the Armenian army.

A presidential decree issued on 28 December 1999 renamed the Yerevan Military Academy to the Vazgen Sargsyan Military University in his honor. The Republican Stadium in Yerevan was named after Vazgen Sargsyan by the same decree. The 8th Separate Motorized Rifle Brigade of the Artsakh Defence Army is named after him. Numerous streets in Armenia and Karabakh, including one in Yerevan's Kentron (Central) district and in Stepanakert, and a park in Kapan are named after Sargsyan. Statues or busts have been erected in his honor in Yerevan (2007), Ararat (2009), Vanadzor, Kapan (2015), Vagharshapat (Ejmiatsin, 2015), Shushi (Shushi) and other locations. In 2000, 27 October was declared a day of remembrance by the Armenian government. In 2002, the Armenian Defence Ministry created the Medal of Vazgen Sargsyan, which is awarded for "meritorious services towards military education and improvements in service life".

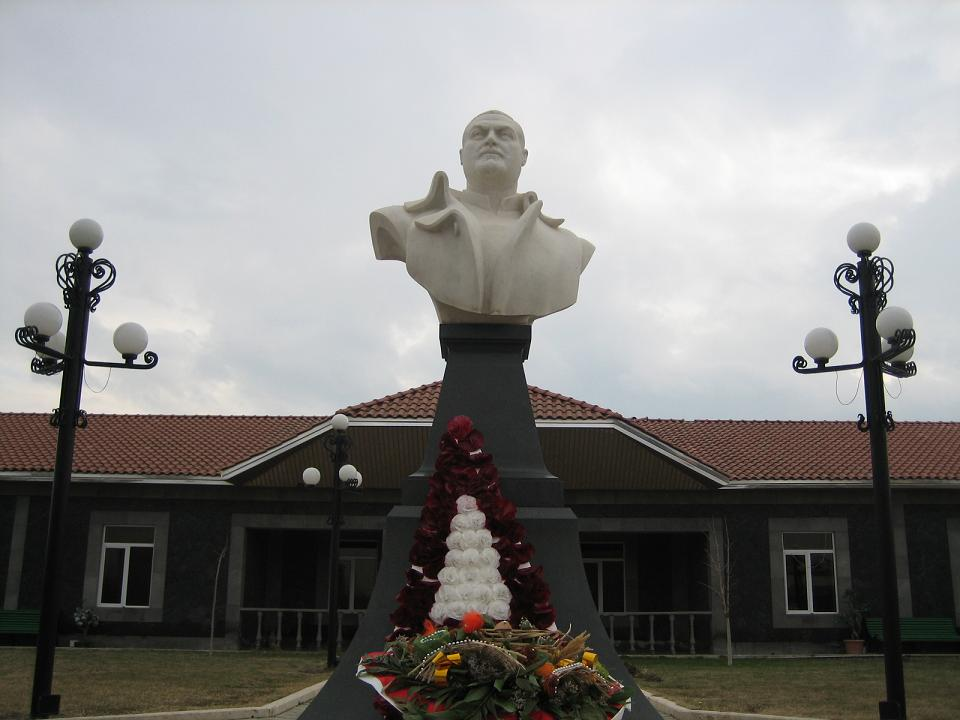
Sargsyan's Museum in Ararat

Every year, on 5 March (his birthday) and 27 October (the day of his assassination), Sargsyan is commemorated in Armenia and Nagorno-Karabakh. His comrades from the Yerkrapah Volunteer Union, high state officials and many others visit the Yerablur cemetery, where Sargsyan is buried next to many Armenian military figures.

Vazgen Sargsyan's museum was opened in his hometown of Ararat on 5 March 2001 by the decision made by the Armenian government. Notable attendees of the opening ceremony of the museum included Prime Minister Andranik Margaryan, National Assembly Speaker Armen Khachatryan, Defence Minister Serzh Sargsyan, and other high-ranking military and diplomatic representatives, such as the former Russian minister of defence Pavel Grachev, who revealed in his speech at the ceremony that Sargsyan was once his student.

Sargsyan is often referred to as Sparapet, a military rank that has existed since the ancient Kingdom of Armenia. The phrase Sparapet Hayots (literally meaning 'Supreme Commander of the Armenians') is engraved on Sargsyan's memorial in Yerablur cemetery. The song "Sparapet" by Alla Levonyan is dedicated to his memory.

=== Public image and recognition ===
"The public doesn't really know me. Only people in my inner circle know me well. Others identify me by the beard, always mad, sweaty and that is today's image. People don't understand me, they are scared of me."

— Vazgen Sargsyan

In Armenia, Nagorno-Karabakh and, to a lesser extent, in the Armenian diaspora, Vazgen Sargsyan is recognized as a national hero. Several survey conducted by Gallup, Inc., International Republican Institute, and the Armenian Sociological Association from 2006 to 2008, revealed that Vazgen Sargsyan topped the list of national heroes in public perception, with 15%–20% of the respondents giving his name. He has often ranked third, behind 20th-century military commanders Andranik and Garegin Nzhdeh, in surveys about the greatest Armenian national heroes. Sargsyan is widely considered a charismatic leader. He was generally perceived as a man of "tremendous power and charisma," known for his "brutality, temper, and nonchalant attitude toward the law".

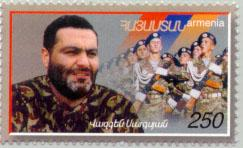
Sargsyan on a 2000 post stamp

His contributions have been acknowledged by his colleagues and comrades. In 1997, President Ter-Petrosyan stated that Sargsyan is someone who deserves the title of National Hero of Armenia. He added that "if all members of our government worked as conscientiously and selflessly as Vazgen Sargsyan, we would live in a perfect state." Armenia's second president Robert Kocharyan said in his speech during Sargsyan's funeral, "history will provide its assessment of Vazgen Sargsyan as a politician who stood at the birth of the Armenian state. His role in the creation of the national army is beyond appraisal. By his life and commitment, Vazgen Sargsyan has made an immense contribution to the establishment of a powerful country." In 2007, giving a speech on the occasion of the 15th anniversary of the Armenian Armed Forces, then-Defence Minister Serzh Sargsyan noted that he "was a valiant soldier dedicated to the cause of our statehood, and who revered the strength of Armenia and the strength of the Armenian soldier, and who had a staunch belief in our future success".

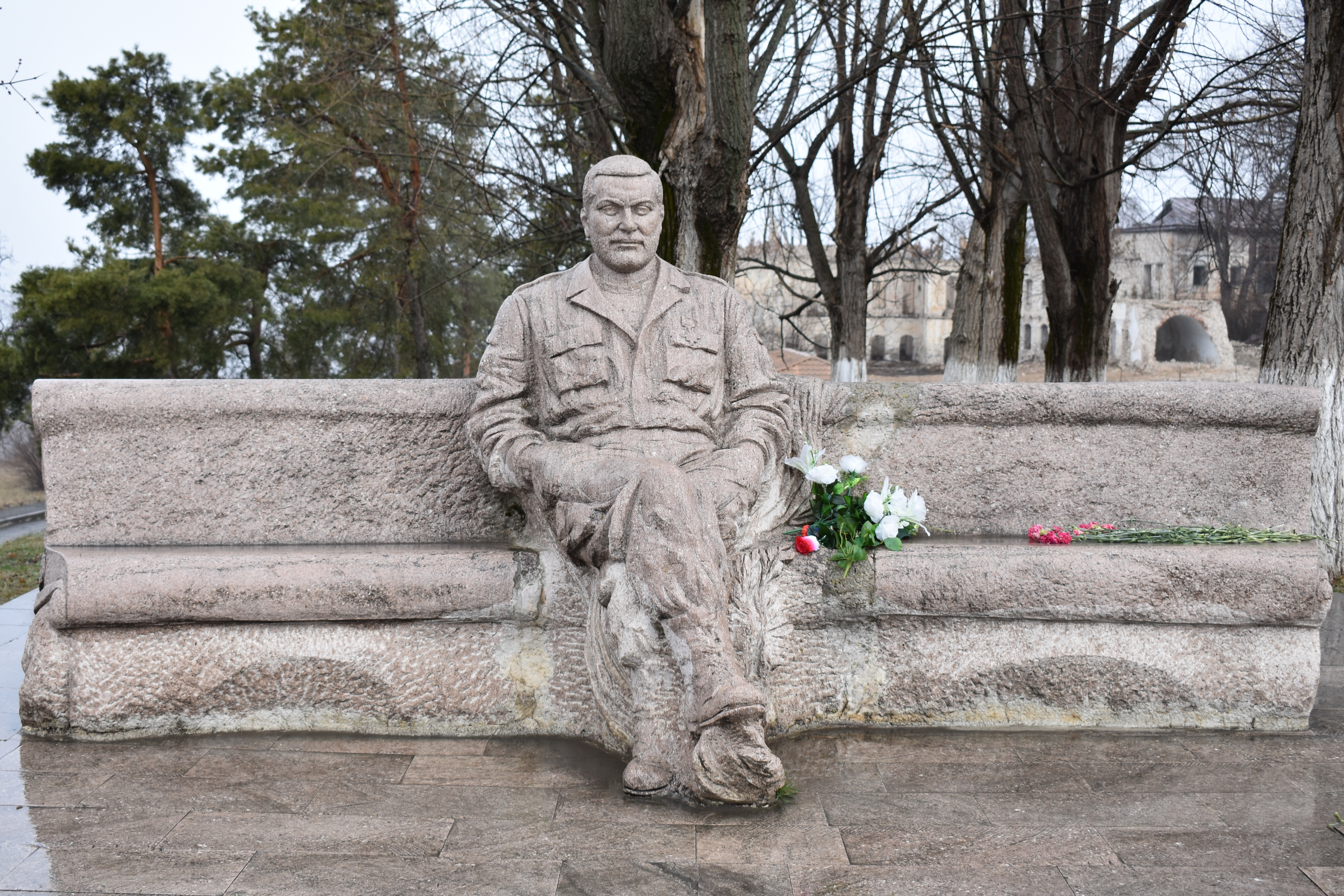
Sargsyan's statue in Shushi (Shushi), vandalized and destroyed after the 2020 war.

Manvel Grigoryan, leader of the Yerkrapah Volunteer Union, recognized Sargsyan's contributions, stating that Sargsyan "was a strong individual and his greatness was felt not only during the war, but during the nation-building years after the war". According to Grigoryan "his presence was enough for the foreign leaders to become vigilant." Dr. Ara Sanjian, the director of the Armenian Studies at the Haigazian University, wrote shortly after Sargsyan's assassination:

History will rightly remember Vazgen Sargsyan as the founder of the modern Armenian armed forces and one of the chief architects behind the victories in recent years on the Karabagh front. Comparisons made in recent days with Vardan Mamikonian and Andranik Ozanian are certainly not exaggerations in the technical sense. He seems to have been a personality who never ran away from shouldering the toughest of responsibilities and seemed to end always on the winning side.

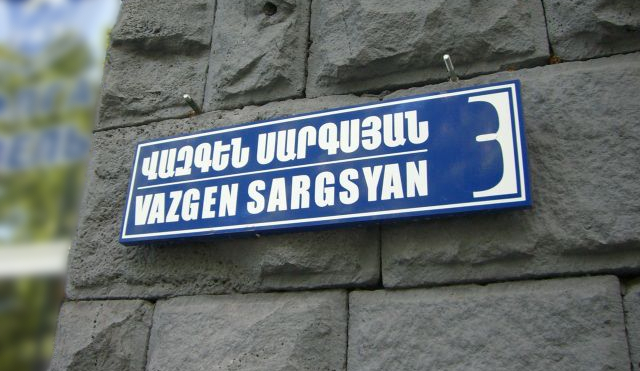
Vazgen Sargsyan Street in central Yerevan

In the West, Sargsyan was generally described as a hard nationalist. The British journalist Jonathan Steele wrote of Sargsyan as "a fierce nationalist who always preferred action and force to words and diplomacy". Encyclopædia Britannica describes Sargsyan as an "Armenian nationalist who devoted much of his life to the Armenian fight with Azerbaijan for control of the Nagorno-Karabakh enclave". Political scientist Razmik Panossian expressed the opinion that he was "the last significant nationalist politician whose commitment to Karabakh and Armenia was not doubted by anyone".

=== Criticism ===
Sargsyan was criticized for being undemocratic, particularly for using his influence in pre-determining the election results. The Commission on Security and Cooperation in Europe suggested in 1999 that his "record does not inspire confidence in his commitment to democracy." The 2008 book Religious Freedom in the World described him as "thuggish" and held him responsible for the 1995 assaults on religious minorities in Armenia (especially those that discourage military service), carried out, allegedly, by Yerkrapah.

Thomas de Waal describes Sargsyan as an "emerging feudal baron." The Yerkrapah, founded by Sargsyan, "took over large areas of the economy." Astourian quoted David Petrosyan, a columnist for the Noyan Tapan news agency and a "thoughtful observer of Armenia's political life", as claiming that Sargsyan "controlled part of the local market in oil products, part of the incomes generated from transport junctions and the greater part of bread production." According to Philip Remler, Sargsyan was one of the prime beneficiaries of the illicit income from the Iran-Armenia border and the "godfather of cross-border trade and contraband".

== See also ==
- List of heads of state and government who were assassinated or executed
- Military history of Armenia
- Monte Melkonian

Political offices
Preceded by Armen Darbinyan	Prime Minister of Armenia; 1999	Succeeded by Aram Sargsyan
Preceded by Serzh Sargsyan	Defence Minister of Armenia; 1995–1999	Succeeded by Vagharshak Harutiunyan
