= Frank Jardine =

Frank Jardine may refer to:

- Frank Jardine (ice hockey) (1924–1999), British ice hockey player
- Francis Lascelles Jardine (1841–1919), Australian pioneer
