= Nairi Hunanyan =

Armenian journalist (born 1965)

- Նաիրի Հունանյան
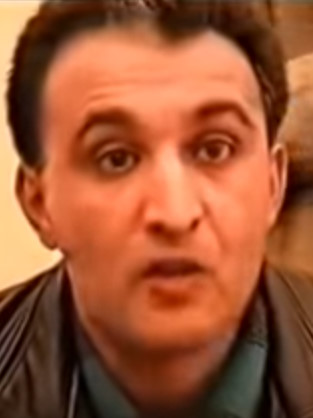
- Born: Nairi Hrachiki Hunanyan; 8 December 1965 (age 60); Yerevan, Armenian SSR, Soviet Union
- Occupation: Journalist
- Political party: Armenian Revolutionary Federation (1990–1992)
- Criminal charges: Murder (8 counts); Terrorism
- Criminal penalty: Life imprisonment x8

Nairi Hrachiki Hunanyan (Armenian: Նաիրի Հրաչիկի Հունանյան, born 8 December 1965) is an Armenian journalist who led the armed attack on the Armenian parliament on 27 October 1999 and killed Prime Minister Vazgen Sargsyan and Parliament Speaker Karen Demirchyan and six other politicians.

== Early life and education ==
Hunanyan was born in 1965 in Yerevan. He served in the Soviet army from 1984 to 1985, when he was discharged for health reasons. He graduated from the Department of Philology of Yerevan State University in 1990.

== Career ==
In 1988, he became an active participant in the Karabakh movement and was one of the founders of the Alliance of Armenian Students. He became a member of the Armenian Revolutionary Federation in 1990. According to the ARF, Hunanyan was expelled from the party in 1992 for misconduct and had not been in any association with the ARF since then. Later he founded and managed the Horizon news agency, which operated for a few months. From 1994 to 1997 he lived in Crimea, Ukraine, teaching the Armenian language at a school in Yevpatoria. He returned to Armenia in 1997. After moving back to Armenia, Hunanyan made more than one visit to Turkey. Hunanyan had developed a plan to improve relations between Armenia and Turkey and reportedly had meetings with several Turkish ministers to discuss the idea. From September 1998 to February 1999 he worked at the Public Television Company of Armenia as a journalist.

== 1999 Armenian parliament shooting ==
On 27 October 1999, Hunanyan and four other gunmen, including his brother Karen Hunanyan and his uncle Vram Galstyan, entered the Armenian parliament building and killed the prime minister Vazgen Sargsyan, speaker of parliament Karen Demirchyan and six other officials. In his statement, Nairi Hunanyan accused the government of leading Armenia into political and economic ruin. The attackers surrendered on 28 October. The five gunmen were later each sentenced to eight life sentences.

Hunanyan claimed that he made the decision to attack parliament by himself and did not receive orders from anyone, although there was much speculation about the true organizers of the attack.
