= Rik Matthys =

Belgian footballer

Personal information
- Date of birth: 9 September 1925
- Place of birth: Borgerhout, Belgium
- Date of death: 13 October 1999 (aged 74)

International career
Years	Team	Apps	(Gls)
1951	Belgium	2	(0)

Rik Matthys (9 September 1925 – 13 October 1999) was a Belgian footballer. He played in two matches for the Belgium national football team in 1951.
