= Francisco Uva =

Portuguese fencer (1904–1999)

Personal information
- Full name: Francisco Sancho de Sousa Uva
- Born: 16 May 1904 São Brás de Alportel, Portugal
- Died: 17 October 1999 (aged 95) Lisbon, Portugal

Sport
- Sport: Fencing

Francisco Uva (16 May 1904 – 17 October 1999) was a Portuguese fencer. He competed in the team épée event at the 1952 Summer Olympics.
