= Armenian parliament shooting =

1999 terrorist attack in Armenia

1999 Armenian parliament shooting
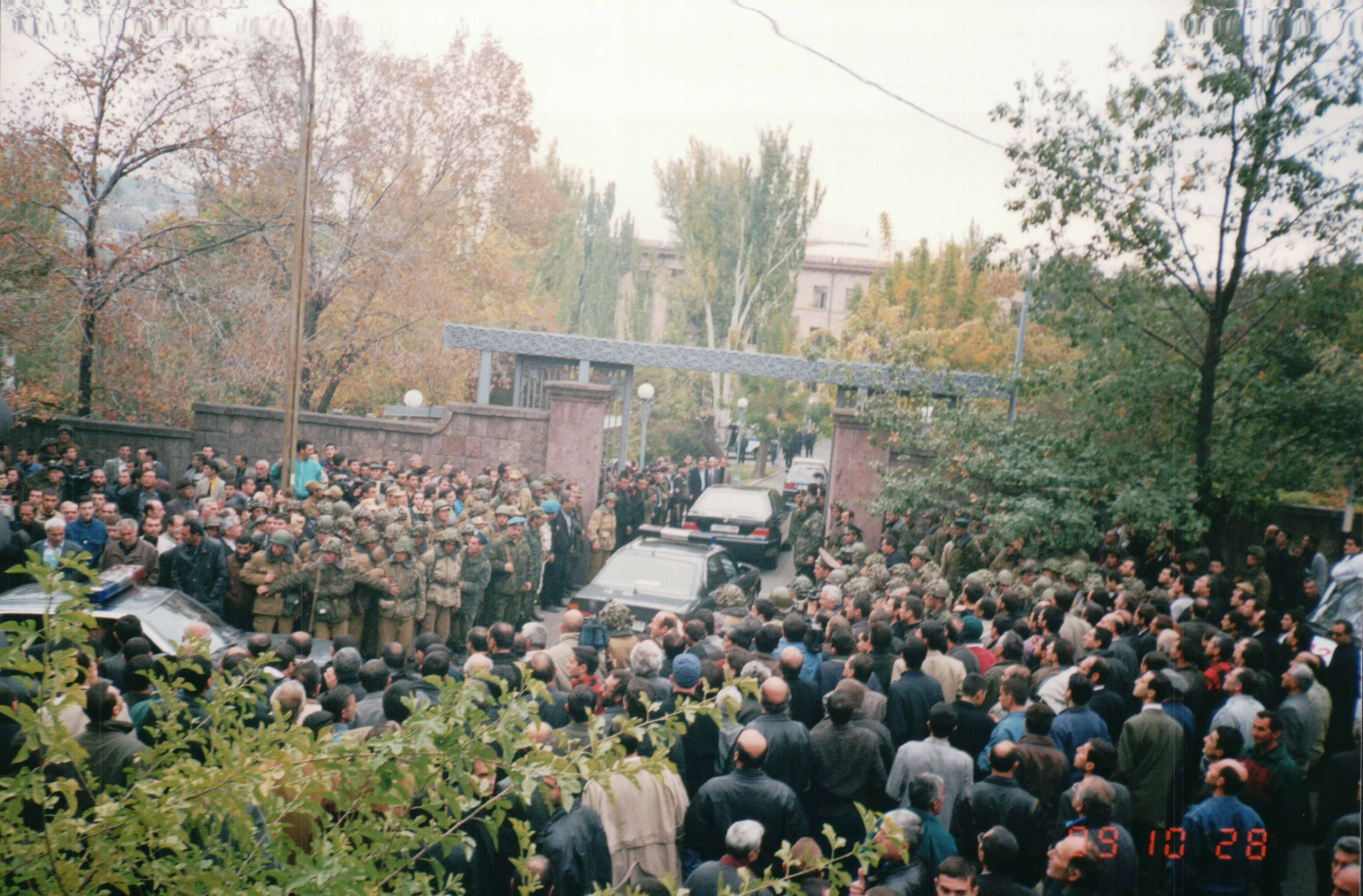
- Scene at main auto entrance to parliament during standoff
- Location: 40°11′23″N 44°30′33″E: National Assembly Building; Yerevan, Armenia
- Date: October 27, 1999; 5:15 pm (UTC+4)
- Target: Vazgen Sargsyan
- Weapon: AK-47
- Deaths: 8 (including Sargsyan)
- Injuries: 30+
- Perpetrators: Nairi Hunanyan, Karen Hunanyan, Vram Galstyan, Derenik Ejanyan, and Eduard Grigoryan
- Defenders: After the occupation of the building: Minister of Interior (Police); Defense Ministry (Armed Forces)
- Motive: Coup d'état (according to perpetrators)

The 1999 Armenian parliament shooting, commonly known in Armenia as October 27 (Armenian: Հոկտեմբերի 27, romanized: Hoktemberi k'sanyot), was an attack on the Armenian National Assembly in the capital of Yerevan on 27 October 1999 by a group of five armed men led by Nairi Hunanyan that, among others, killed the two de facto decision-makers in the country's political leadership—Prime Minister Vazgen Sargsyan and Parliament Speaker Karen Demirchyan. Their reform-minded coalition had won a majority in a parliamentary election held in May of that year and had practically sidelined President Robert Kocharyan from the political scene.

The shooting led to significant changes in the country's political landscape. It remains a subject of numerous conspiracy theories, mostly involving President Kocharyan, whose tenure thereafter was frequently criticized as authoritarian. Sargsyan and Demirchyan were posthumously honored with National Hero of Armenia titles.

== Attack ==
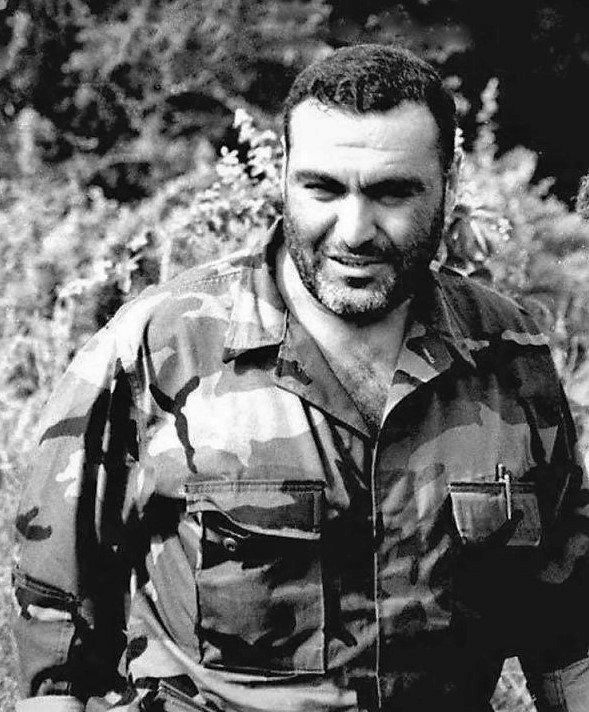
Prime Minister Vazgen Sargsyan, formerly an influential Minister of Defense, was the main target of the shooting.

On 27 October 1999, at around 5:15 p.m., five men led by journalist Nairi Hunanyan, armed with Kalashnikov AK-47 rifles hidden under long coats, broke into the National Assembly Building in Yerevan, while the government was holding a question-and-answer session. They fatally shot eight people:

- Vazgen Sargsyan, Prime Minister (the target)
- Karen Demirchyan, National Assembly Speaker
- Yuri Bakhshyan, Deputy National Assembly Speaker
- Ruben Miroyan, Deputy National Assembly Speaker
- Leonard Petrosyan, Minister of Urgent Affairs
- Henrik Abrahamyan, Member of Parliament
- Armenak Armenakyan, Member of Parliament
- Mikayel Kotanyan, Member of Parliament

The gunmen injured at least 30 people in the parliament.

Hunanyan was accompanied by his brother Karen, uncle Vram, and two others. The group claimed they were carrying out a coup d'état, describing their act as "patriotic" and "needed for the nation to regain its senses." They said they wanted to "punish the authorities for what they do to the nation" and described the government as profiteers "drinking the blood of the people." They claimed Armenia was in a "catastrophic situation" and that "corrupt officials" were not doing anything to provide the way out. Vazgen Sargsyan was the main target of the group and the other deaths were said to be unintended. According to reporters who witnessed the shooting, the men went up to Sargsyan and said, "Enough of drinking our blood," to which Sargsyan calmly responded, "Everything is being done for you and the future of your children." Sargsyan was hit several times. Hunanyan claimed that the eight deaths and dozens of injuries in the attack were all "innocent victims" except for the case of Sargsyan, who he said had "failed the nation". Anna Israelyan, a journalist who witnessed the incident, stated that "the first shots were fired directly at Vazgen Sargsyan at a distance of one to two meters" and, in her words, "it was impossible that he would have survived." Gagik Saratikyan, a cameraman, was the first person from outside to be allowed to go into the building while the men were in control of it. Saratikyan recorded the dead bodies of Sargsyan and Demirchyan. Sargsyan's body was taken out of the parliament building on the evening of 27 October.

=== Government response ===
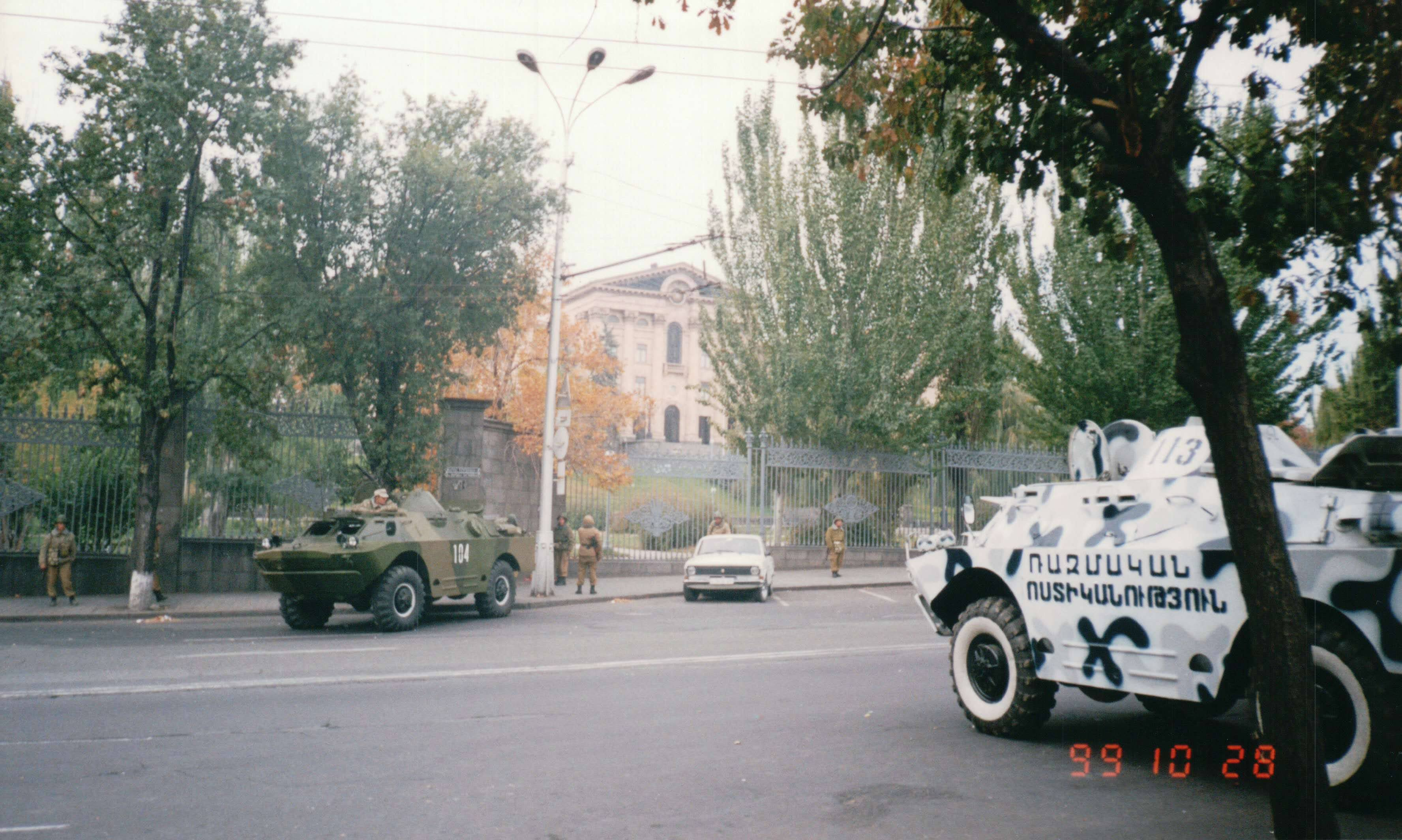
Front of parliament building during standoff

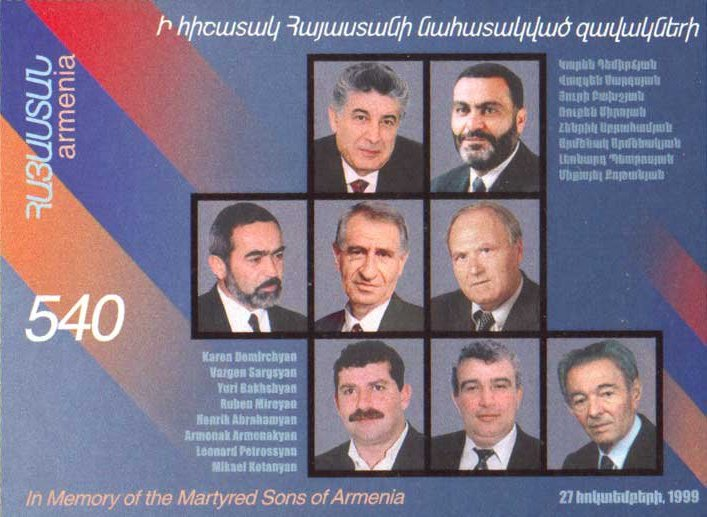
A 2000 postal card depicting the eight victims of the shooting

Soon after the attack, hundreds of policemen and military personnel and two armored personnel carriers were brought into Yerevan, positioned on Baghramyan Avenue surrounding the National Assembly building. Meanwhile, ambulances rushed to the site of the shooting. President Robert Kocharyan was directing the operation of the security forces around the parliament building. While holding around 50 hostages inside the building, the men demanded a helicopter and airtime on national television for a political statement.

President Kocharyan gave a speech on television announcing that the situation was under control. His spokesman was quick to characterize the men as "individual terrorists" and assured that "it's only the parliament building and a very small group." After overnight negotiations with President Kocharyan, the gunmen released the hostages and gave themselves up on the morning of 28 October after a standoff that lasted 17–18 hours. Kocharyan had guaranteed the personal security of the gunmen and the right to a free trial. In the meantime, the Armenian armed forces blocked the roads leading to Yerevan for security reasons.

On 28 October 1999, President Kocharyan declared a three-day mourning period. The state funeral ceremony for the victims of the parliament shooting took place from 30 October to 31 October 1999. The bodies of the victims, including Sargsyan, were placed inside the Yerevan Opera Theater. Karekin II, the Catholicos of All Armenians, and Aram I, the Catholicos of the Holy See of Cilicia, gave prayers.

== Reaction ==
=== Public ===
A poll carried out immediately after the shooting (on 30–31 October) by the Center for Sociological Studies of the National Academy of Sciences of Armenia found that 56.9% of respondents said that the 27 October events were a crime against statehood and the country's authorities. 63.4% of those questioned believed that the terrorist group consisted of assassins–traitors and enemies.

=== International ===
- Australia: Foreign Affairs Minister Alexander Downer condemned the assassination of the high officials.
- France: The Armenian embassy in Paris received telegrams from President Jacques Chirac, Prime Minister Lionel Jospin and many others.
- Iran: Vice President Hassan Habibi visited the Armenian embassy in Tehran, where he left a condolence note in the book on the sad occasion.
- Kazakhstan: President Nursultan Nazarbayev of Kazakhstan sent a telegram of condolences to President Kocharyan, saying it was a "barbaric" incident that had been received "with shock and indignation". Nazarbayev emphasized that this "monstrous crime once again demands that we join efforts to step up the uncompromising fight against terrorism which threatens people's stability, creative work and peaceful life."
- Russia: President Boris Yeltsin expressed his "deep anger" and "sharp condemnation of the actions of the terrorists". He instructed the Russian ambassador in Yerevan to convey his "deepest sympathies" and condolences to all those who had suffered "as a result of this barbarous act". President Yeltsin was also quoted as saying there was a need "to curb decisively all manifestations of terrorism, wherever they happened," stressing Russia's readiness for "close co-operation on this issue with all concerned parties."
- Syria: Parliament Speaker Abdul Qadir Qaddura offered condolences.
- United Kingdom: The Foreign Office spokesman said: "This is clearly a terrible blow for Armenia after gaining independence in 1991 and after efforts to build up a democracy. We do not condone terrorism."
- United States: President Bill Clinton condemned the shootings, calling it a "senseless act", and stated renewed US support for Armenia. He added, "At this time of tragedy we renew our support for the people of Armenia and their leaders as they continue to build on the principles today's victims have so courageously embodied." Vice President Al Gore stated: "I was deeply saddened by today's shocking and brutal attack on the Armenian Parliament. I condemn this assault on Armenian democracy and extend my deep condolences to the families of the victims." On November 17, 1999, the House of Representatives passed a resolution deploring the assassinations.

== Investigation and trial ==
The five men were charged with terrorism aimed at undermining authority on 29 October. The investigation was led by Gagik Jhangiryan, the Chief Military Prosecutor of Armenia, who claimed his team was looking for the masterminds of the shooting even after the trial had begun. According to Jhangiryan, the investigating team considered more than a dozen theories. By January 2000, Jhangiryan's investigators considered the connection of Kocharyan and his circle to the parliament shooting. Several figures close to Kocharyan were arrested, including Aleksan Harutiunyan, the Deputy Presidential Adviser, and Harutiun Harutiunyan, the Deputy Director of the Public Television of Armenia but, by the summer of that year, they were released. Eventually, Jhangiryan failed to find evidence linking Kocharyan to the shooting.

The investigation ended and the case was sent to court on 12 July 2000. The trial began on 15 February 2001, in Yerevan's Kentron and Nork-Marash District Court. The judicial case was transferred to the jurisdiction of Aghvan Hovsepyan, the Prosecutor General, and his office, which finally closed the case for lack of evidence. The five main perpetrators of the shooting (Nairi Hunanyan, his younger brother Karen Hunanyan, their uncle Vram Galstyan, Derenik Ejanyan and Eduard Grigoryan) were sentenced to life in prison on 2 December 2003.

== Conspiracy theories ==
It has never been fully explained what motivated the attack: the gunmen claimed to have been acting on their own initiative, and despite abundant conspiracy theories, no convincing evidence surfaced to suggest that any political leader or party was behind the attack. Nevertheless, the killings left a leadership void in the political establishment. Conspiracy theories immediately flourished that the gunmen had been acting on orders to sabotage a Karabakh peace deal, but a decade on, the available evidence still pointed to the leading gunman being a loner with a grudge against the Armenian political elite.

In an interview in April 2013, Rima Demirchyan, the widow of Karen Demirchyan, suggested that the shooting was commanded from outside of Armenia and that it was not an attempted coup, but rather an assassination.

Former U.S. ambassador to Armenia Marie Yovanovitch suggested in Lessons From the Edge: A Memoir that the disagreements over Nagorno-Karabakh policy had "played a large role in the shooting.

=== Alleged involvement of Robert Kocharyan and Serzh Sargsyan ===
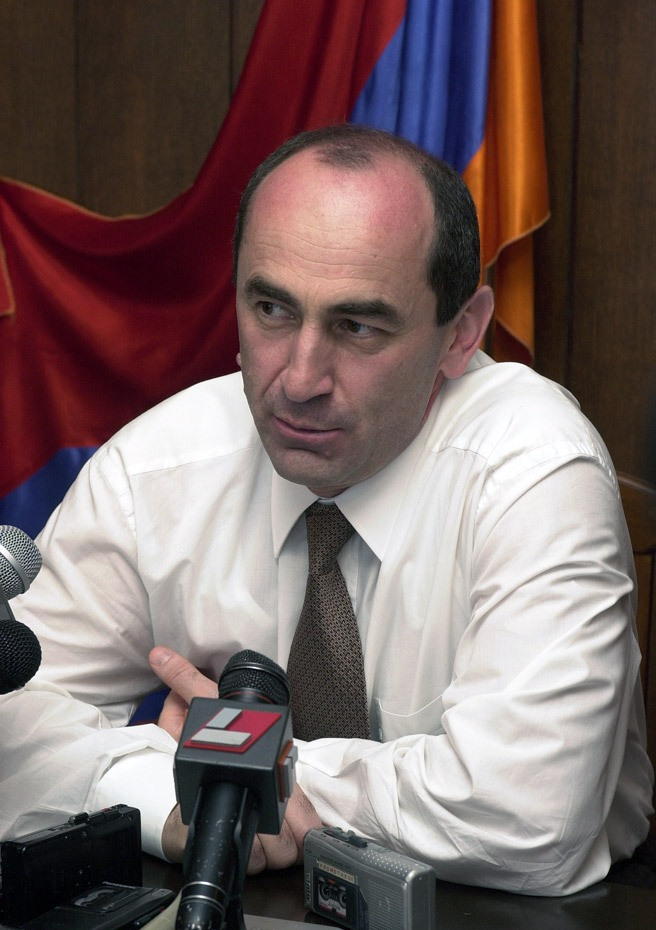
Robert Kocharyan, President at the time of the shooting

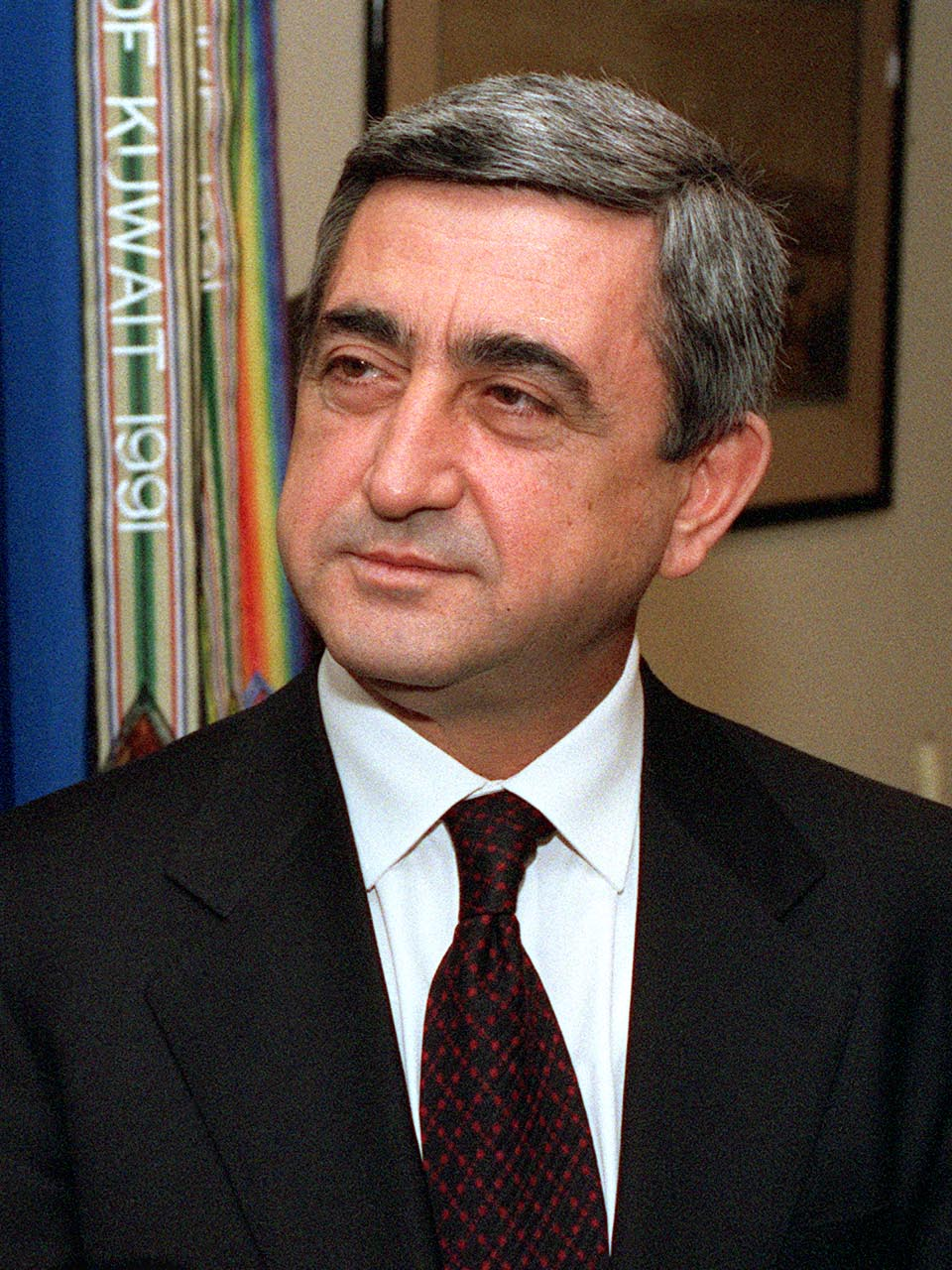
Serzh Sargsyan, National Security Minister at the time of the shooting

Although the investigation did not find any considerable evidence linking Kocharyan to the Hunanyan group, many Armenian people believe that President Robert Kocharyan and National Security Minister Serzh Sargsyan were behind the assassination of Vazgen Sargsyan and other leading politicians. (Note: "Some relatives and friends of the assassinated officials, among them two of Armenia's most popular opposition leaders, suspect Kocharian of having a hand in the killings and have openly accused him of obstructing justice. Kocharian and his supporters have always dismissed the charges." "It thrust the Armenian government into serious turmoil, with government factions loyal to the slain officials suspecting Kocharian and then National Security Minister Serzh Sarkisian of eliminating increasingly powerful rivals.") In January 2000, investigators alleged that several members of President Robert Kocharian's inner circle had been behind the October 27 shooting, promoting some opposition figures to call for Kocharian's resignation. However, Kocharyan gradually consolidated his power throughout the year to emerge as the most powerful figure in the country's leadership.

Armenia's first president Levon Ter-Petrosyan has repeatedly "accused Kocharyan and Serzh Sargsyan and their 'criminal-oligarchic' system of being the real perpetrators of the parliament shooting." In the run up to the 2008 presidential election he explicitly stated that "If you vote for Serzh Sargsyan on February 19, you will vote for Nairi Hunanyan. He who elects Serzh Sarkisian would desecrate the holy graves of Karen Demirchian and Vazgen Sarkisian." In 2009 the Armenian National Congress, an opposition alliance led by Ter-Petrosyan, released a statement on the 10th anniversary of the shooting blaming "Kocharyan and Serzh Sarkisyan for the killings, claiming that most Armenians consider them the masterminds of the crime." The statement continued, "October 27 was a violent seizure of power perpetrated by means of terrorism. Terrorism thus became the regime's main tool for clinging to power and reproducing itself."

In March 2013, Vazgen Sargsyan's younger brother Aram Sargsyan stated that he has many questions to both governments of Robert Kocharyan and Serzh Sargsyan. He claimed the judicial process of October 27 "deepened the public distrust in the authorities" as "many questions remain unanswered today" According to Aram Sargsyan, the disclosure of the shooting is "vital" for Armenia. Sargsyan at conclusion insisted that he "have never accused this or the former authorities in being responsible for October 27. I have accused them in not fully disclosing October 27."

Albert Bazeyan stated in 2002 that "We have come to the conclusion that the crime was aimed at making Robert Kocharian's power unlimited and uncontrolled. By physically eliminating Karen Demirchyan and Vazgen Sargsyan, its organizers wanted to create prerequisites for Kocharyan's victory in the future presidential elections."

=== Alleged Russian involvement ===
In late April 2005, in an interview to an Azerbaijani newspaper Realniy Azerbaijan, the former Russian secret service agent Alexander Litvinenko accused the Main Intelligence Directorate (GRU) of the General Staff of the Armed Forces of the Russian Federation of having organised the Armenian parliament shooting, ostensibly to derail the peace process which would have resolved the Nagorno-Karabakh conflict, but he offered no evidence to support the accusation. In May 2005, the Russian embassy in Armenia denied any such involvement, and described Litvinenko's accusation as an attempt to harm relations between Armenia and Russia by people against the democratic reforms in Russia. The Armenian National Security Service also denied the Russian involvement in the shootings. The NSS spokesman Artsvin Baghramyan stated "not a single fact or even a hint relating to Litvinenko's theory emerged during the trial." President Robert Kocharyan's national security adviser, Garnik Isagulyan, called Litvinenko a "sick man."

On October 27, 2012, the French-based Armenian political refugee and former Apostolic priest Artsruni Avetisysan (also known by his religious name Ter Girgor) gave an interview to A1plus, in which he claimed that the Russian secret services had been behind the shooting. On May 7, 2013, in an interview to the same agency, Artsruni Avetisysan claimed the shooting was perpetrated by Lieutenant General Vahan Shirkhanyan, the Deputy Minister of Defense from 1992 to 1999 and the National Security Minister Serzh Sargsyan. He insisted the shooting was assisted by the Russian secret services in order to bring the "Neo-Bolshevik criminal clan" of Serzh Sargsyan and Robert Kocharyan into power.

==== Other foreign involvement allegations ====
Ashot Manucharyan, one of the leading members of the Karabakh Committee, the former Minister of Internal Affairs and Levon Ter-Petrosyan's National Security Adviser and his close ally until 1993, without presenting any proof and having access to secret services, stated in October 2000 that Armenian officials were warned by a foreign country about the shootings. He also declared that "Western special services" were involved in the October 27 events. In Manucharyan's words, "the special services of the US and France are acting to destroy Armenia, and in this context, they are much likely to be involved in the realization of the terrorist acts in Armenia."

==== Disclaimer of the Armenian Revolutionary Federation ====
Nairi Hunanyan, the leader of the armed group, was an ex-member of the Armenian Revolutionary Federation (Dashnaktsutyun). According to the ARF representatives, Hunanyan was expelled from the party in 1992 for misconduct and had not been in any association with the ARF since then. Some speculations have been made about the involvement of the ARF in the shootings. Ashot Manucharyan stated in 2000 that he is much worried about the circumstance that "a number of Dashnaktsutyun party leaders are acting in the interest of the American foreign policy."

== Aftermath ==
Armenian-American journalist Garin Hovannisian described the aftermath of the attack as follows:

For weeks the Armenians mourned in silence, but from their grief a startling theory began to evolve. The assassinations had been pinned on the terrorist leader, an ex-journalist named Nairi Hunanyan, but the public was not satisfied. The fact was that Prime Minister Sargsyan and Speaker Demirchyan had recently created in parliament an alliance for democratic reform, and they were only men who commanded the resources and popularity to challenge the president one day. Of course, there was no actual evidence that Robert Kocharyan was complicit in this monstrous crime against the Armenian people, but it was clear that he emerged from the bloodbath with absolute power.

From early June to late October 1999, the political system in Armenia was based on the Demirchyan-Sargsyan tandem, which controlled the military, the legislative and the executive branches. Their assassination disrupted the political balance in the country and the political arena of Armenia was left in disarray for months. The assassination hit Armenia's international reputation, resulting in a decline in the foreign investment. The "de facto dual command" of Sargsyan and Demirchyan transferred to President Robert Kocharyan.

Aram Khachatryan from the People's Party of Armenia was elected speaker of the parliament, while Vazgen Sargsyan's brother Aram Sargsyan was appointed prime minister. However, Aram Sargsyan was dismissed by President Kocharyan in May 2000 due to an "inability to work" with Sargsyan's cabinet. Republican Party leader Andranik Margaryan came to replace him as prime minister on May 12, 2000.

Kocharyan successfully prevented the Unity bloc-controlled parliament from impeaching him, and gradually consolidated power around himself. Kocharyan remained highly unpopular in Armenia, as a poll in August 2002 showed at least three other politicians (Stepan Demirchyan, Artashes Geghamyan, Levon Ter-Petrosyan) having more support than him. In 2009, Anahit Bakhshyan, an MP from Heritage and the widow of Yuri Bakhshyan, the assassinated Deputy National Assembly Speaker, stated that "Robert Kocharyan turned October 27, 1999, terrorism act to good use, making a shift towards more totalitarian regime." Human Development Report wrote in 2000 that the "October 27 events adversely impacted the situation in the country in all aspects and spheres and its consequences will be felt for long, in economic, political and social expressions" and predicted a further decline in human development.

== Later developments ==
On 27 October 2009, a memorial was installed in the National Assembly park. During the opening ceremony, Stepan Demirchyan, the son of one of the two most senior victims, Karen Demirchyan, stated that "It is impossible to get an entire revelation while the current authorities are in power. However, sooner or later the reality will be disclosed. This is a matter of our statehood's dignity. Only in case of having an entire revelation we will be able to overcome the negative consequences of the October 27 events."

== See also ==
- List of attacks on legislatures
