= Mikayel Kotanyan =

Armenian economist and politician (1927–1999)

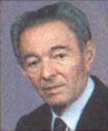
Mikayel Kotanyan

Mikael Khachiki Kotanyan (September 1, 1927, Irind, Etchmiadzin Province, Armenian SSR, AKPFSR, USSR – October 27, 1999, Yerevan, Armenia) was an economist. He was Doctor of Economic Sciences (1972), a professor (1978), an academician of the ASSR Academy of Sciences (1986), correspondent member (1977), and one of the victims of the October 27 terrorist attack.

== Biography ==
In 1945, after graduating from Nerkin Sasnashen Secondary School, he entered the Faculty of Economics at Yerevan State University. He graduated from Yerevan State University in 1950. In 1950–1951, he worked as a financier in the main department of "Hayenergo." In 1951, he was admitted to graduate studies at YSU, and then he was sent to the Academy of Sciences of the USSR to continue his studies. In 1956, he defended his candidate's theses; in 1972, he defended his doctoral theses and received the scientific degree of Doctor of Economics. From 1954 to 1958, he worked as a lecturer at a three-year party school attached to the CPC Central Committee. In 1960–1964, he was the editor-in-chief of the "People's Economy of Armenia" magazine; in 1964–1983, he was a senior researcher, head of the department, and deputy director of the Institute of Economics of the Armenian Academy of Sciences. In 1977, he was elected a correspondent of the Academy of Sciences of Armenia, and in 1986, he became a full member. In 1983–1987, he was the head of the economics department of the CPC Central Committee; in 1987–1999, he was the director of the Institute of Economics of the NAS of RA; in 1989–1999, he was the president of the Union of Economists of Armenia; in 1996, he was a member of the International Academy of Management; in 1985–1989, he was a member of the Supreme Council of the Armenian SSR; and in 1999, he was a member of the RA National Assembly.

== Death ==
He was killed during the crime that took place in the RA National Assembly.

== Legacy ==
After the tragic death of Mikayel Kotanyan, by the decision of the RA President, the Institute of Economics of the National Academy of Sciences of Armenia was named after him. A scholarship was appointed in his name at the Yerevan Institute of People's Economy. The school in his native village was named after Mikael Kotanyan. On October 25, 2000, the US Embassy opened an Internet Computer Center in his name at the Panos Terlemezyan State School of Fine Arts in Yerevan. The "Mikael Kotanyan" charitable foundation was opened.

== Activity ==
The works refer to the economic laws of material interests and material interest, the identification of tendencies to increase the role of spiritual production and intellectual activity in the development of society, the issues of the market economy.

== Awards ==
Movses Khorenatsi Medal, 2000 (posthumous)

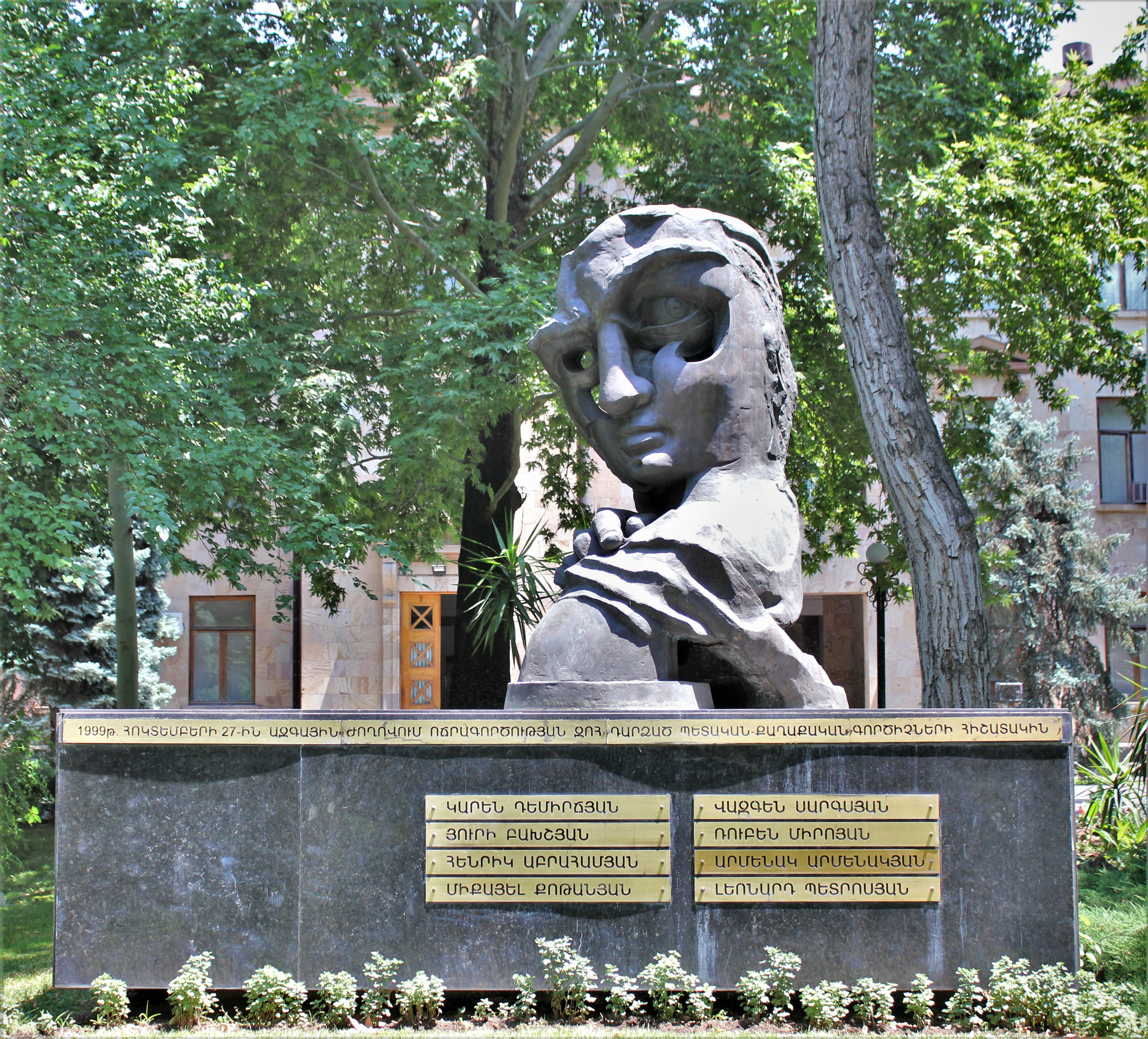
In memory of the victims of October 27, the Biblical David was placed in the courtyard of the RA National Assembly building. Author: Yervand Kochar

== Books ==
- Material interest during the construction of communism, E, 1966.
- Scientific and technical progress and its promotion, E., 1969.
- Targeted complex program of socio-economic development of the Armenian SSR, E., 1982.
- Market economy, E., 1998. Economic stimulation of scientific and technical progress, E., 1975.
- Scientific-technical revolution and economic theory, E., 1988
