= Henrik Abrahamyan =

Armenian politician and journalist (1939–1999)

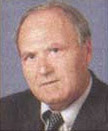
- Born: October 4, 1939; Sarukhan, Kamo region, Armenia
- Died: October 27, 1999 (aged 60); Yerevan, Armenia

Henrik Hayriki Abrahamyan (October 4, 1939, Sarukhan, Nor Bayazet District, Armenian SSR, USSR – October 27, 1999, Yerevan, Armenia) was a statesman and public figure, journalist, philologist, and candidate of the historical sciences. He died as a result of a terrorist attack on the Armenian parliament building.

== Biography ==
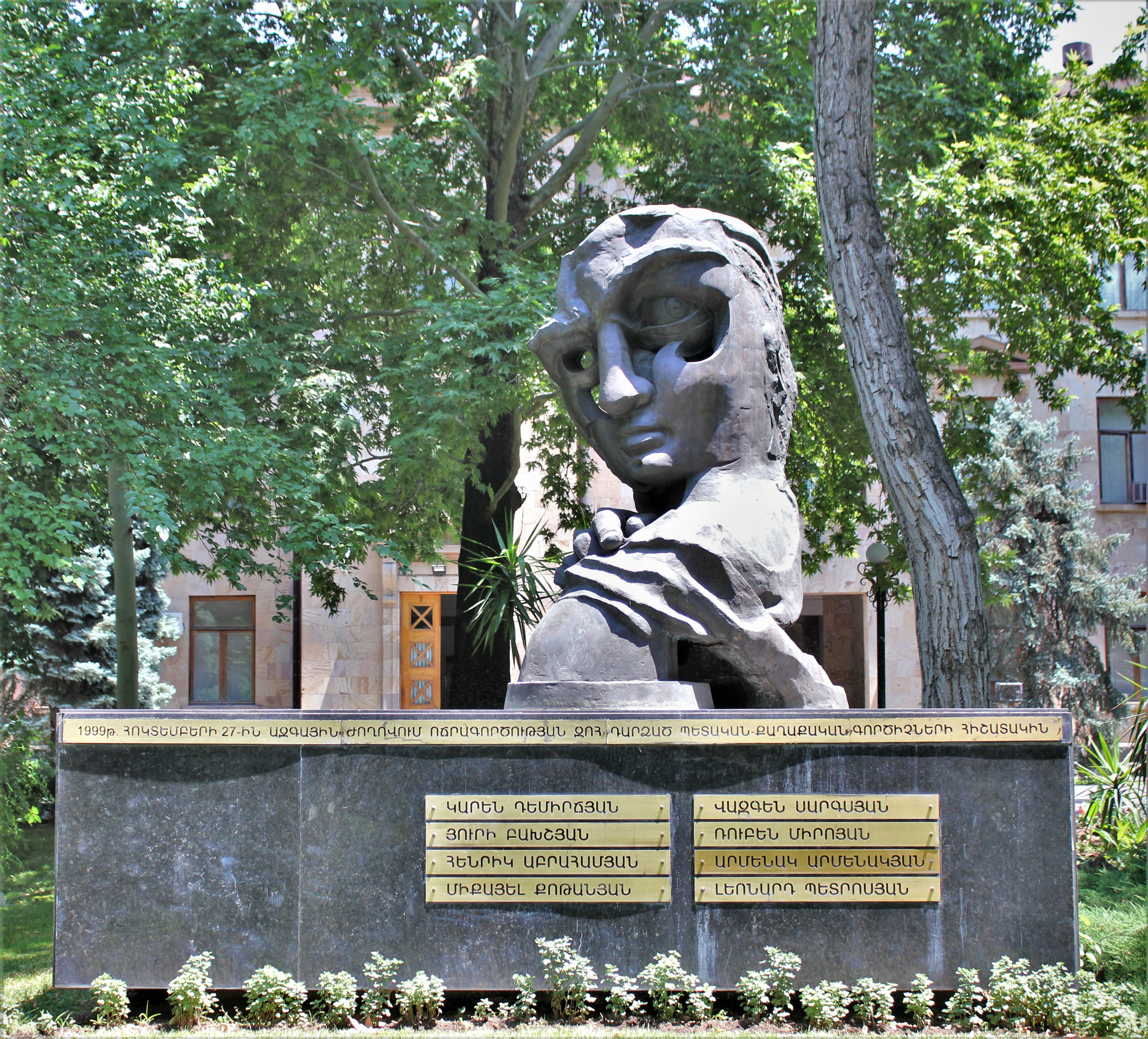
In memory of the victims of October 27, the Biblical David was placed in the courtyard of the RA National Assembly building. Author: Yervand Kochar

Henrik Abrahamyan was born in the village of Sarukhan, Kamo region. In 196 he graduated from Kh. Armenian State Pedagogical Institute named after Abovyan. Since 1961, he worked as a proofreader, reporter, and deputy editor-in-chief in the editorial office of "Avangard" newspaper. In 1982, he started working in the propaganda department of the Central Committee of the Communist Party of Armenia, in 1986 he was appointed the deputy editor-in-chief of the "Soviet Armenia" newspaper. In 1990–1999, he held the position of editor-in-chief of Hayastan newspaper.

On May 30, 1999, he was elected to the National Assembly of Armenia. He was a member of the National Assembly's Standing Committee on Foreign Relations, a member of the "Unity" faction, and a member of the People's Party's political council.

Died as a result of the terrorist attack in the Armenian parliament building.

== Family ==
He was married and has three children.

== Awards and medals ==
Candidate of historical sciences By the decree of the President of Armenia on December 27, 1999, he was awarded the Movses Khorenatsi medal posthumously.

== Books ==
- "On the long road of bravery"
- "Roads of Fate", (co-author: Gevorg Devrikyan)
- "The Two Faces of Time"
- "Armenian fortresses"
- "Bayazet"
