= Frank Jardine (ice hockey) =

British ice hockey player

- Born: March 20, 1924; Glasgow, Scotland
- Died: October 22, 1999 (aged 75)
- Position: Forward
- SNL team: Glasgow Mohawks

William Francis Stuart Jardine (20 March 1924 – 22 October 1999) was a British professional ice hockey player. He played as a forward for the Glasgow Mohawks in the Scottish National League and represented Great Britain at the 1948 Winter Olympics in St. Moritz. He was born in Glasgow, Scotland, United Kingdom.
