= Ruben Miroyan =

Armenian politician (1939–1999)

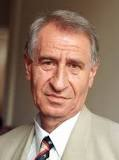
- Born: October 19, 1939; Yerevan, Armenia
- Died: October 27, 1999 (aged 60); Yerevan, Armenia
- Citizenship: Armenian
- Education: Yerevan State University
- Known for: Member of the National Assembly of Armenia
- Term: May 30, 1999 - October 17, 1999
- Political party: Communist Party of the Soviet Union

Ruben Miroyan (October 19, 1939, Yerevan, Armenian SSR, USSR – October 27, 1999, Yerevan, Armenia) was an Armenian politician and statesman. He was killed in the Armenian parliament building as a result of terrorism.

== Biography ==
He was born on November 19, 1939, in Yerevan.

=== Education ===
1959–1964: Faculty of Economics, Yerevan State University.

In 1985, he graduated from the Academy of National Economy under the Council of Ministers of the USSR, receiving the qualification of economist.

=== Work ===
In the years 1965–1971, he was the first secretary of the regional committee of 26 commissars of HLCEM Yerevan. In 1971–1974, he worked for the CPC Central Committee. From 1974, he was the deputy chairman of the 26-commissar regional council of Yerevan, the first deputy; in 1985–1991, he was the inspector of the CPC Central Committee, the chairman of the executive committee of the Yerevan Leninist regional council, and the first secretary of the 26-commissar district committee of the CPC Yerevan. In 1992–1999, he worked in the system of the RA Ministry of Post and Telecommunications.

== Political activity ==
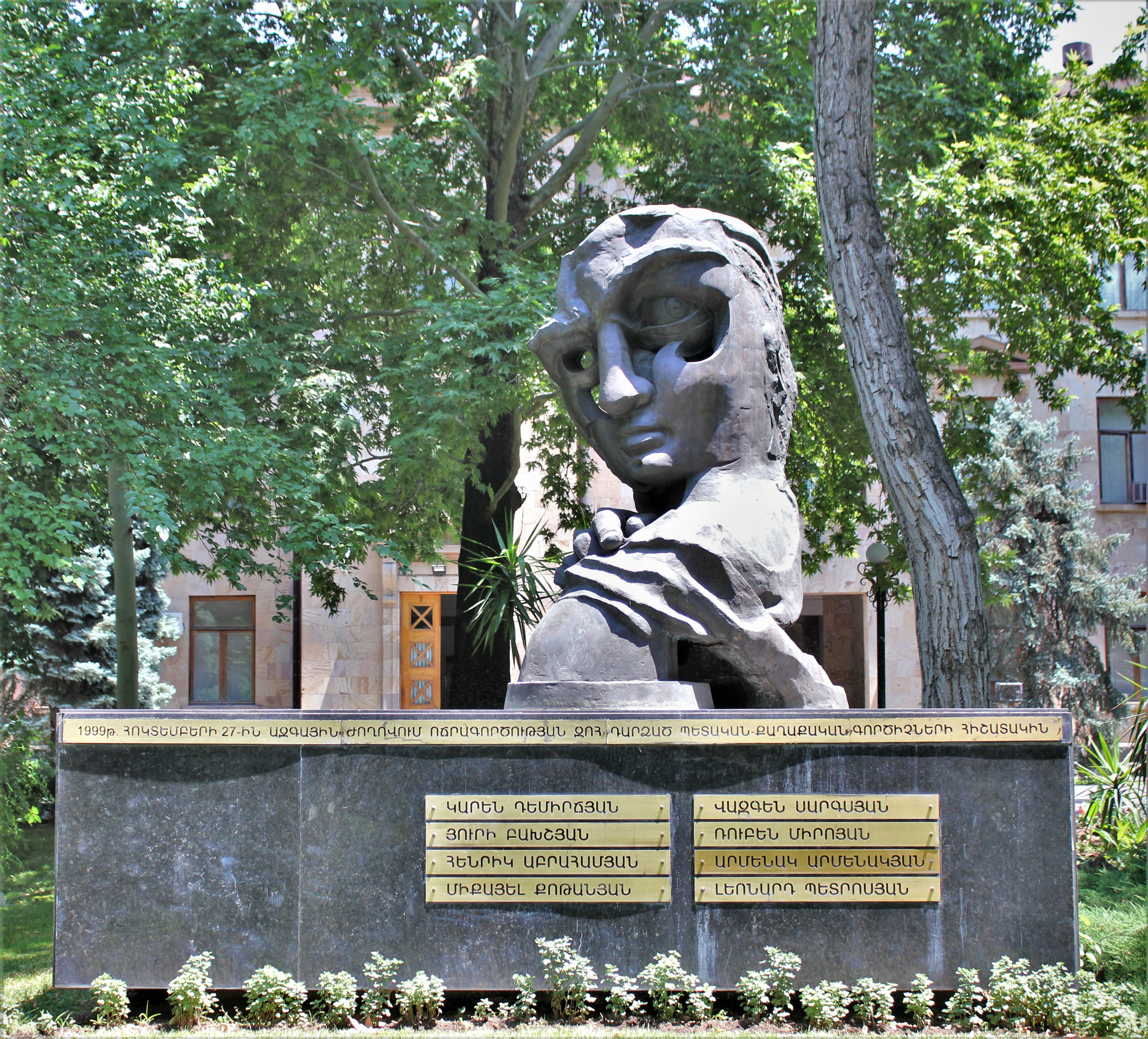
In memory of the victims of October 27, the Biblical David was placed in the courtyard of the RA National Assembly building. Author: Yervand Kochar

On May 30, 1999, he was elected a member of the National Assembly on the proportional list of the "Unity" bloc. In 1999 On June 10, he was elected deputy speaker of the National Assembly. Member of the "Unity" faction. Secretary of PPA department. Awarded posthumously with the "Anania Shirakatsi Medal".

== Death ==
Died in 1999. due to the terrorist attack during the session of the National Assembly on October 27.

== Family ==
He was married and had two children.
