= Rowing at the 1960 Summer Olympics – Men's coxed four =

Men's coxed four at the Games of the XVII Olympiad
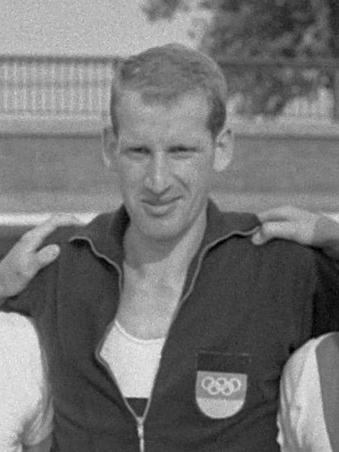
- Horst Effertz (1964), a member of the gold medal team
- Venue: Lake Albano
- Dates: 31 August – 3 September 1960
- Competitors: 105 from 21 nations
- Winning time: 6:39.12

Medalists
1st place, gold medalist(s)		United Team of Germany: Gerd Cintl; Horst Effertz; Klaus Riekemann; Jürgen Litz; Michael Obst (cox)
2nd place, silver medalist(s)		France: Robert Dumontois; Claude Martin; Jacques Morel; Guy Nosbaum; Jean Klein (cox)
3rd place, bronze medalist(s)		Italy: Fulvio Balatti; Romano Sgheiz; Franco Trincavelli; Giovanni Zucchi; Ivo Stefanoni (cox)

The men's coxed four competition at the 1960 Summer Olympics took place at Lake Albano, Italy. It was held from 31 August to 3 September. There were 21 boats (105 competitors) from 21 nations, with each nation limited to a single boat in the competition. The event was won by the United Team of Germany in its debut in the event (the rowers were from West Germany; Germany had previously won four times). Silver went to the French crew, the nation's first medal in the event since 1936. The defending champions Italy received bronze this time. In an event which saw constant turnover even from consistently strong nations, three members of the Italian team returned from the 1956 gold-medal crew to earn a second medal this Games: Romano Sgheiz, Ivo Stefanoni, and Franco Trincavelli were only the 2nd, 3rd, and 4th men to earn multiple medals in the coxed four.

== Background ==
This was the 11th appearance of the event. Rowing had been on the programme in 1896 but was cancelled due to bad weather. The coxed four was one of the four initial events introduced in 1900. It was not held in 1904 or 1908, but was held at every Games from 1912 to 1992 when it (along with the men's coxed pair) was replaced with the men's lightweight double sculls and men's lightweight coxless four.

German teams had won the last three European championships since the 1956 Games (East Germany in 1957, West Germany in 1958 and 1959). The Olympic team for the United Team of Germany was a West German crew, including three of the members of the 1959 European champion team; it was heavily favoured. Italy, the reigning champions and 1960 Olympic hosts, returned three members of their crew but had not found success since their victory in Melbourne.

Romania made its debut in the event; East and West Germany competed together as the United Team of Germany for the first time. The United States made its ninth appearance, most among nations to that point.

== Competition format ==
The coxed four event featured five-person boats, with four rowers and a coxswain. It was a sweep rowing event, with the rowers each having one oar (and thus each rowing on one side). The competition used the 2000 metres distance that became standard at the 1912 Olympics and which has been used ever since except at the 1948 Games.

This rowing competition consisted of three main rounds (heats, semifinals, and final), as well as a repechage round that allowed teams that did not win their heats to advance to the semifinals.

- Quarterfinals: Four heats. With 21 boats entered, there were to be five boats per heat except the last heat, which had six. The winner of each heat advanced directly to the semifinals, all other boats went to the repechage.
- Repechage: Four heats. With 17 boats racing in but not winning their initial heats, there were four or five boats per repechage heat. The top two boats in each repechage heat advanced to the semifinals, with the remaining boats eliminated.
- Semifinals: A total of 12 boats reached the semifinals (4 from the heats, 8 from the repechage). They were divided into two semifinals of six boats each. The top three boats in each semifinal advanced to the final, the fourth through sixth place boats were eliminated.
- Final: The final consisted of the remaining six boats.

== Schedule ==
All times are Central European Time (UTC+1)

Date	Time	Round
Tuesday, 30 August 1960	15:00	Quarterfinals
Wednesday, 31 August 1960	17:00	Repechage
Friday, 2 September 1960	15:00	Semifinals
Saturday, 3 September 1960	15:00	Final

== Results ==
=== Quarterfinals ===
==== Quarterfinal 1 ====
Rank	Rowers	Coxswain	Nation	Time	Notes
1	Fulvio Balatti; Romano Sgheiz; Franco Trincavelli; Giovanni Zucchi	Ivo Stefanoni	Italy	6:40.10	Q
2	Mick Allen; Max Annett; John Hudson; Peter Waddington	Lionel Robberds	Australia	6:47.23	R
3	Martin Bielz; Petre Milincovici; Ionel Petrov; Ștefan Pongratz	Mircea Roger	Romania	6:47.71	R
4	Väinö Huhtala; Matti Maisala; Reino Poutanen; Kauko Hänninen	Reijo Sundén	Finland	6:56.70	R
5	Panagiotis Kalombratsos; Ilias Polyzois; Ioannis Simbonis; Triantafyllos Tsongas	Ioannis Theodorakeas	Greece	7:01.25	R
6	Franco Cobas; Emilio García; José Méndez; Alberto Valtierra	Armando González	Spain	7:07.23	R

==== Quarterfinal 2 ====
Rank	Rowers	Coxswain	Nation	Time	Notes
1	Gerd Cintl; Horst Effertz; Jürgen Litz; Klaus Riekemann	Michael Obst	United Team of Germany	6:34.55	Q
2	Tibor Bedekovits; Csaba Kovács; László Munteán; Pál Wágner	Gyula Lengyel	Hungary	6:40.01	R
3	Svend Helge Hansen; Poul Justesen; Mogens Pedersen; Erik Rask	Ejgo Vejby Nielsen	Denmark	6:47.37	R
4	Jorge Cravinho; José Porto; Ilídio Silva; José Vieira	Rui Valença	Portugal	6:50.94	R
5	Eduardo Endtner; Harri Klein; Paulino Leite; Francisco Todesco	Waldemar Scovino	Brazil	6:57.48	R

==== Quarterfinal 3 ====
Rank	Rowers	Coxswain	Nation	Time	Notes
1	Pavel Hofmann; Richard Nový; Petr Pulkrábek; Oldřich Tikal	Miroslav Koníček	Czechoslovakia	6:47.03	Q
2	Chuck Alm; Roy Rubin; Monte Stocker; Mike Yonker	Kurt Seiffert	United States	6:49.62	R
3	Frank Moerman; Toon de Ruiter; Ype Stelma; Henk Wamsteker	Marius Klumperbeek	Netherlands	6:50.48	R
4	Simon Crosse; Richard Knight; John M. Russell; John Tilbury	Terrence Rosslyn-Smith	Great Britain	6:51.00	R
5	Koji Fukuda; Hatsuhiko Mizuki; Shunji Murai; Naotake Okubo	Osamu Saito	Japan	7:05.51	R

==== Quarterfinal 4 ====
Rank	Rowers	Coxswain	Nation	Time	Notes
1	Oleg Aleksandrov; Boris Fyodorov; Igor Khokhlov; Valentin Zanin	Igor Rudakov	Soviet Union	6:38.76	Q
2	Dieter Ebner; Helmuth Kuttelwascher; Horst Kuttelwascher; Dieter Losert	Wolfdietrich Traugott	Austria	6:42.33	R
3	Robert Dumontois; Claude Martin; Jacques Morel; Guy Nosbaum	Jean Klein	France	6:46.75	R
4	Vladimir Nekora; Janez Pintar; Adolf Potočar; Vekoslav Skalak	Nikola Stipanicev	Yugoslavia	6:56.91	R
5	Rune Andersson; Lars-Eric Gustafsson; Ulf Gustafsson; Kjell Hansson	Owe Lostad	Sweden	8:25.34	R

=== Repechage ===
==== Repechage heat 1 ====
Rank	Rowers	Coxswain	Nation	Time	Notes
1	Robert Dumontois; Claude Martin; Jacques Morel; Guy Nosbaum	Jean Klein	France	6:47.11	Q
2	Mick Allen; Max Annett; John Hudson; Peter Waddington	Lionel Robberds	Australia	6:47.31	Q
3	Simon Crosse; Richard Knight; John M. Russell; John Tilbury	Terrence Rosslyn-Smith	Great Britain	6:48.21	
4	Eduardo Endtner; Harri Klein; Paulino Leite; Francisco Todesco	Waldemar Scovino	Brazil	7:09.78	

==== Repechage heat 2 ====
Rank	Rowers	Coxswain	Nation	Time	Notes
1	Tibor Bedekovits; Csaba Kovács; László Munteán; Pál Wágner	Gyula Lengyel	Hungary	6:51.08	Q
2	Martin Bielz; Petre Milincovici; Ionel Petrov; Ștefan Pongratz	Mircea Roger	Romania	6:55.63	Q
3	Vladimir Nekora; Janez Pintar; Adolf Potočar; Vekoslav Skalak	Nikola Stipanicev	Yugoslavia	7:00.71	
4	Koji Fukuda; Hatsuhiko Mizuki; Shunji Murai; Naotake Okubo	Osamu Saito	Japan	7:10.50	

==== Repechage heat 3 ====
Rank	Rowers	Coxswain	Nation	Time	Notes
1	Chuck Alm; Roy Rubin; Monte Stocker; Mike Yonker	Kurt Seiffert	United States	6:49.78	Q
2	Väinö Huhtala; Matti Maisala; Reino Poutanen; Kauko Hänninen	Reijo Sundén	Finland	6:51.14	Q
3	Svend Helge Hansen; Poul Justesen; Mogens Pedersen; Erik Rask	Ejgo Vejby Nielsen	Denmark	6:51.70	
4	Rune Andersson; Lars-Eric Gustafsson; Ulf Gustafsson; Kjell Hansson	Owe Lostad	Sweden	7:05.90	

==== Repechage heat 4 ====
Rank	Rowers	Coxswain	Nation	Time	Notes
1	Dieter Ebner; Helmuth Kuttelwascher; Horst Kuttelwascher; Dieter Losert	Wolfdietrich Traugott	Austria	6:41.09	Q
2	Frank Moerman; Toon de Ruiter; Ype Stelma; Henk Wamsteker	Marius Klumperbeek	Netherlands	6:41.43	Q
3	Jorge Cravinho; José Porto; Ilídio Silva; José Vieira	Rui Valença	Portugal	6:57.87	
4	Panagiotis Kalombratsos; Ilias Polyzois; Ioannis Simbonis; Triantafyllos Tsongas	Ioannis Theodorakeas	Greece	6:57.98	
5	Franco Cobas; Emilio García; José Méndez; Alberto Valtierra	Armando González	Spain	7:07.50	

=== Semifinals ===
==== Semifinal 1 ====
Rank	Rowers	Coxswain	Nation	Time	Notes
1	Fulvio Balatti; Romano Sgheiz; Franco Trincavelli; Giovanni Zucchi	Ivo Stefanoni	Italy	7:02.86	Q
2	Mick Allen; Max Annett; John Hudson; Peter Waddington	Lionel Robberds	Australia	7:05.04	Q
3	Tibor Bedekovits; Csaba Kovács; László Munteán; Pál Wágner	Gyula Lengyel	Hungary	7:05.84	Q
4	Dieter Ebner; Helmuth Kuttelwascher; Horst Kuttelwascher; Dieter Losert	Wolfdietrich Traugott	Austria	7:06.85	
5	Väinö Huhtala; Matti Maisala; Reino Poutanen; Kauko Hänninen	Reijo Sundén	Finland	7:15.12	
6	Pavel Hofmann; Richard Nový; Petr Pulkrábek; Oldřich Tikal	Miroslav Koníček	Czechoslovakia	7:19.71	

==== Semifinal 2 ====
Rank	Rowers	Coxswain	Nation	Time	Notes
1	Gerd Cintl; Horst Effertz; Jürgen Litz; Klaus Riekemann	Michael Obst	United Team of Germany	7:00.47	Q
2	Robert Dumontois; Claude Martin; Jacques Morel; Guy Nosbaum	Jean Klein	France	7:02.95	Q
3	Oleg Aleksandrov; Boris Fyodorov; Igor Khokhlov; Valentin Zanin	Igor Rudakov	Soviet Union	7:03.26	Q
4	Chuck Alm; Roy Rubin; Monte Stocker; Mike Yonker	Kurt Seiffert	United States	7:06.25	
5	Martin Bielz; Petre Milincovici; Ionel Petrov; Ștefan Pongratz	Mircea Roger	Romania	7:10.58	
6	Frank Moerman; Toon de Ruiter; Ype Stelma; Henk Wamsteker	Marius Klumperbeek	Netherlands	7:12.02	

=== Final ===
Rank	Rowers	Coxswain	Nation	Time
1st place, gold medalist(s)	Gerd Cintl; Horst Effertz; Jürgen Litz; Klaus Riekemann	Michael Obst	United Team of Germany	6:39.12
2nd place, silver medalist(s)	Robert Dumontois; Claude Martin; Jacques Morel; Guy Nosbaum	Jean Klein	France	6:41.62
3rd place, bronze medalist(s)	Fulvio Balatti; Romano Sgheiz; Franco Trincavelli; Giovanni Zucchi	Ivo Stefanoni	Italy	6:43.72
4	Oleg Aleksandrov; Boris Fyodorov; Igor Khokhlov; Valentin Zanin	Igor Rudakov	Soviet Union	6:45.67
5	Mick Allen; Max Annett; John Hudson; Peter Waddington	Lionel Robberds	Australia	6:45.80
6	Tibor Bedekovits; Csaba Kovács; László Munteán; Pál Wágner	Gyula Lengyel	Hungary	6:51.65
