= Finland at the 1960 Summer Olympics =

- IOC code: FIN
- NOC: Finnish Olympic Committee

in Rome
- Competitors: 117 (107 men and 10 women) in 14 sports
- Flag bearer: Eeles Landström
- Medals Ranked 17th: Gold 1 Silver 1 Bronze 3 Total 5

Summer Olympics appearances (overview)
- 1908; 1912; 1920; 1924; 1928; 1932; 1936; 1948; 1952; 1956; 1960; 1964; 1968; 1972; 1976; 1980; 1984; 1988; 1992; 1996; 2000; 2004; 2008; 2012; 2016; 2020; 2024

Other related appearances
- 1906 Intercalated Games

Finland competed at the 1960 Summer Olympics in Rome, Italy. 117 competitors, 107 men and 10 women, took part in 92 events in 14 sports.

== Medalists ==
=== Gold ===
- Eugen Ekman – Gymnastics, Men's Pommeled Horse

=== Silver ===
- Pentti Linnosvuo – Shooting, Rapid-Fire Pistol (Mixed)

=== Bronze ===
- Eeles Landström – Athletics, Men's Pole Vault
- Jorma Limmonen – Boxing, Men's Featherweight
- Veli Lehtelä and Toimi Pitkänen – Rowing, Men's Coxless Pairs

== Athletics ==
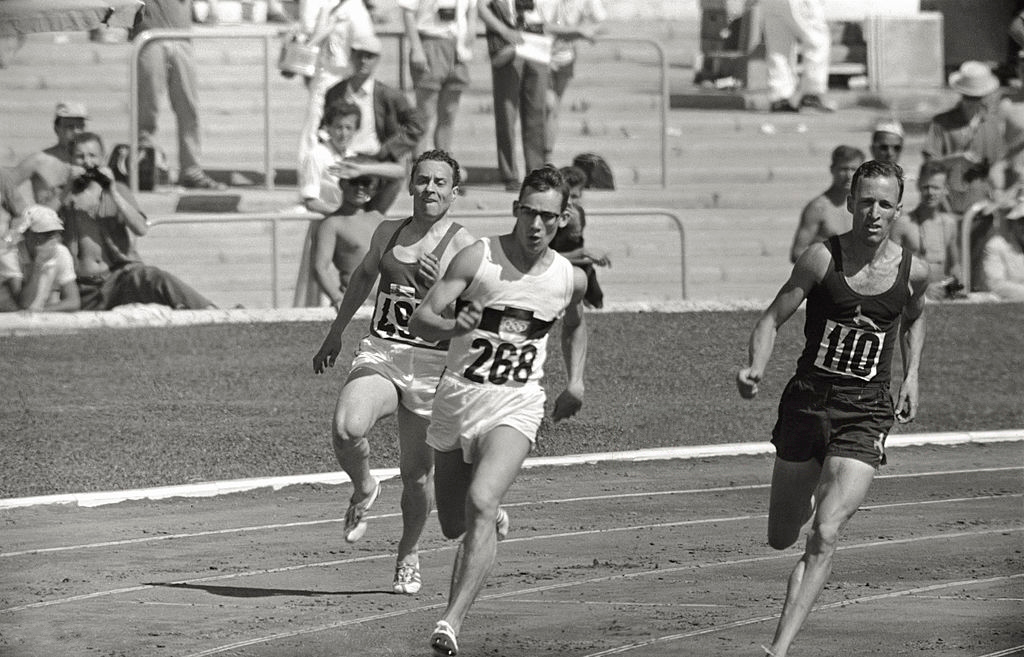
400 metres sprint, Voitto Hellstén, Jochen Reske and Gordon Day

== Cycling ==
Four male cyclists represented Finland in 1960.

Individual road race

- Paul Nyman
- Raimo Honkanen
- Unto Hautalahti
- Matti Herronen

Team time trial

- Paul Nyman
- Unto Hautalahti
- Raimo Honkanen
- Matti Herronen

Sprint

- Paul Nyman

1000m time trial

- Paul Nyman

== Diving ==
Men

Athlete	Event	Preliminary		Semi-final				Final			
Athlete	Event	Points	Rank	Points	Rank	Total	Rank	Points	Rank	Total	Rank
Pekka Heinonen	10 m platform	43.49	26	Did not advance							

== Fencing ==
Six fencers, four men and two women, represented Finland in 1960.

Men's épée

- Rolf Wiik
- Kaj Czarnecki
- Kalevi Pakarinen

Men's team épée

- Kaj Czarnecki, Kurt Lindeman, Rolf Wiik, Kalevi Pakarinen

Women's foil

- Marjatta Moulin
- Barbara Helsingius

== Modern pentathlon ==
Three male pentathletes represented Finland in 1960.

Individual

- Kurt Lindeman
- Berndt Katter
- Eero Lohi

Team

- Kurt Lindeman
- Berndt Katter
- Eero Lohi

== Rowing ==
Finland had 12 male rowers participate in four out of seven rowing events in 1960.

Men's single sculls

- Jorma Kortelainen

Men's coxless pair

- Veli Lehtelä
- Toimi Pitkänen

Men's coxless four

- Eero Laine
- Heikki Laine
- Pertti Laine
- Arto Nikulainen

Men's coxed four

- Väinö Huhtala
- Matti Maisala
- Reino Poutanen
- Kauko Hänninen
- Reijo Sundén

== Shooting ==
Eight shooters represented Finland in 1980.

25 m pistol

- Pentti Linnosvuo
- Kalle Sievänen

50 m pistol

- Pentti Linnosvuo
- Kaarle Pekkala

300 m rifle, three positions

- Vilho Ylönen
- Esa Kervinen

50 m rifle, three positions

- Esa Kervinen
- Pauli Janhonen

50 m rifle, prone

- Vilho Ylönen
- Jussi Nordqvist

Trap

- Väinö Broman

== Swimming ==
Men

Athlete	Event	Heat		Semifinal		Final	
Athlete	Event	Time	Rank	Time	Rank	Time	Rank
Karri Käyhkö	100 m freestyle	56.8	10 Q	56.6	9	Did not advance	
Kari Haavisto	400 m freestyle	4:36.0	15	—N/a		Did not advance	
Ilkka Suvanto	400 m freestyle	4:42.1	25	—N/a		Did not advance	
Ilkka Suvanto	1500 m freestyle	18:41.1	17	—N/a		Did not advance	
Stig-Olof Grenner	100 m backstroke	1:04.7	10 Q	1:05.2	=12	Did not advance	
Pekka Lairola	200 m breaststroke	2:43.3	19	Did not advance			
Ilkka Suvanto	200 m butterfly	2:23.9	=10 Q	DNF		Did not advance	
Ilkka Suvanto; Kari Haavisto; Stig-Olof Grenner; Karri Käyhkö	4 × 200 m freestyle	8:29.7	6 Q	—N/a		8:29.7	5
Ilkka Suvanto; Kari Haavisto; Stig-Olof Grenner; Karri Käyhkö	4 × 100 m medley	4:27.3	14	—N/a		Did not advance	

== See also ==
- Finland at the 1960 Summer Paralympics
