= Denmark at the 1960 Summer Olympics =

- IOC code: DEN (DAN used at these Games)
- NOC: Danish Olympic Committee

in Rome
- Competitors: 100 (88 men and 12 women) in 15 sports
- Flag bearer: Benny Schmidt
- Medals Ranked 13th: Gold 2 Silver 3 Bronze 1 Total 6

Summer Olympics appearances (overview)
- 1896; 1900; 1904; 1908; 1912; 1920; 1924; 1928; 1932; 1936; 1948; 1952; 1956; 1960; 1964; 1968; 1972; 1976; 1980; 1984; 1988; 1992; 1996; 2000; 2004; 2008; 2012; 2016; 2020; 2024; 2028

Other related appearances
- 1906 Intercalated Games

Denmark competed at the 1960 Summer Olympics in Rome, Italy. 100 competitors, 88 men and 12 women, took part in 46 events in 15 sports. Cyclist Knud Enemark Jensen died during the team time trial.

== Medalists ==
=== Gold ===
- Paul Elvstrøm — Sailing, men's Finn individual competition
- Erik Hansen — Canoeing, men's K1 1,000 metres kayak singles

=== Silver ===
- Hans Fogh and Ole Erik Petersen — Sailing, Flying Dutchman
- William Berntsen, Steen Christensen and Søren Hancke — Sailing, 5.5 Metre
- Poul Andersen, John Danielsen, Henning Enoksen, Henry From, Bent Hansen, Poul Jensen, Flemming Nielsen, Hans Nielsen, Harald Nielsen, Poul Pedersen, Jørn Sørensen and Tommy Troelsen — Football (soccer), men's team competition

=== Bronze ===
- Erik Hansen, Arne Høyer, Erling Jessen and Helmuth Nyborg — Canoeing, men's K1 4x500 metres kayak relay

== Boxing ==
Men's flyweight

- Villy Bækgaard Andersen (=17th)

Men's featherweight

- Børge Krogh (=17th)

Men's welterweight

- Benny Nielsen (=17th)

Men's light middleweight

- Leif Hansen (=17th)

Men's middleweight

- Achton Mikkelsen (=17th)

== Canoeing ==
Athlete	Event	Heats		Semifinals		Final	
Athlete	Event	Time	Rank	Time	Rank	Time	Rank
Erik Hansen	Canoeing at the 1960 Summer Olympics – Men's K-1 1000 metres	3:57.04	1	3:57.51	1	3:53.00	1

== Cycling ==
Eight male cyclists represented Denmark in 1960.

Team time trial

- Knud Enemark Jensen
- Vagn Bangsborg
- Niels Baunsøe
- Jørgen Jørgensen

Team pursuit

- John Lundgren
- Leif Larsen
- Jens Sørensen
- Kurt vid Stein

== Diving ==
Women

Athlete	Event	Preliminary		Final			
Athlete	Event	Points	Rank	Points	Rank	Total	Rank
Hanna Laursen	10 m platform	48.89	14	Did not advance			
Bende Velin	10 m platform	48.35	16	Did not advance			

== Fencing ==
One fencer represented Denmark in 1960.

Men's sabre

- Palle Frey

== Modern pentathlon ==
One male pentathlete represented Denmark in 1960.

Individual

- Benny Schmidt

== Rowing ==
Denmark had 16 male rowers participate in five out of seven rowing events in 1960.

Men's double sculls

- Jannik Madum Andersen
- Poul Mortensen

Men's coxless pair

- Tage Grøndahl
- Elo Tostenæs

Men's coxed pair

- Jens Berendt Jensen
- Knud Nielsen
- Sven Lysholt Hansen (cox)

Men's coxless four

- Hugo Christiansen
- Mogens Jensen
- Børge Kaas Andersen
- Ole Kassow

Men's coxed four

- Poul Justesen
- Mogens Pedersen
- Svend Helge Hansen
- Erik Rask
- Ejgo Vejby Nielsen (cox)

== Sailing ==
Open

Athlete	Event	Race							Net points	Final rank
Athlete	Event	1	2	3	4	5	6	7	Net points	Final rank
Paul Elvstrøm	Finn	1	5	1	2	5	1	~~DNS~~	8171	Gold medal
Hans Fogh; Ole Gunnar Petersen	Flying Dutchman	7	18	1	8	5	1	~~13~~	5991	Silver medal
Aage Birch; Paul L. Jørgensen; Niels P. Markussen	Dragon	2	~~DSQ~~	13	11	3	5	7	4715	6
William Berntsen; Søren Hancke; Steen Christensen	5.5 Metre	1	5	5	1	~~10~~	8	2	5678	Silver medal

== Shooting ==
Four shooters represented Denmark in 1960.

25 m pistol

- Per Nielsen

300 m rifle, three positions

- Uffe Schultz Larsen
- Egon Stephansen

50 m rifle, three positions

- Niels Petersen
- Uffe Schultz Larsen

50 m rifle, prone

- Egon Stephansen
- Niels Petersen

== Swimming ==
Women

Athlete	Event	Heat		Final	
Athlete	Event	Time	Rank	Time	Rank
Kirsten Michaelsen	100 m backstroke	1:14.3	18	Did not advance	
Ethel Ward Petersen	100 m backstroke	1:12.6	9	Did not advance	
Inge Andersen	200 m breaststroke	2:59.9	15	Did not advance	
Dorrit Kristensen	200 m breaststroke	2:56.2	7 Q	2:55.7	8
