= Brazil at the 1960 Summer Olympics =

- IOC code: BRA
- NOC: Brazilian Olympic Committee

in Rome
- Competitors: 72 (71 men and 1 woman) in 14 sports
- Flag bearer: Adhemar Ferreira da Silva
- Medals Ranked 39th: Gold 0 Silver 0 Bronze 2 Total 2

Summer Olympics appearances (overview)
- 1920; 1924; 1928; 1932; 1936; 1948; 1952; 1956; 1960; 1964; 1968; 1972; 1976; 1980; 1984; 1988; 1992; 1996; 2000; 2004; 2008; 2012; 2016; 2020; 2024; 2028

Brazil competed at the 1960 Summer Olympics in Rome, Italy. 72 competitors, 71 men and 1 woman, took part in 35 events in 14 sports. Brazilians obtained two bronze medals in Rome. The swimmer Manuel dos Santos was a bronze medalist in men's 100 metre freestyle. The men's basketball team also won the bronze medal. Flagbearer and defending two-time Olympic champion Adhemar Ferreira da Silva could not repeat his performance and placed fourteenth in the triple jump.

== Medalists ==
Medal	Name	Sport	Event	Date
Bronze	Manuel dos Santos	Swimming	Men's 100 metre freestyle	August 27
Bronze	Brazil national men's basketball team: Edson Bispo dos Santos; Moyses Blas; Waldemar Blatskauskas; Algodão; Carmo de Souza; Carlos Domingos Massoni; Waldyr Boccardo; Wlamir Marques; Amaury Pasos; Fernando Pereira De Freitas; Antônio Salvador Sucar; Eduardo Schall Jatyr	Basketball	Men's tournament	September 10

Medals by sport
Sport	1st place, gold medalist(s)	2nd place, silver medalist(s)	3rd place, bronze medalist(s)	Total
Basketball	0	0	1	1
Swimming	0	0	1	1
Total	0	0	2	2

Medals by gender
Gender	1st place, gold medalist(s)	2nd place, silver medalist(s)	3rd place, bronze medalist(s)	Total
Male	0	0	2	2
Female	0	0	0	0
Mixed	0	0	0	0
Total	0	0	2	2

== Athletics ==
Men
Track & road events

Athlete	Event	Heat		Quarterfinal		Semifinal		Final	
Athlete	Event	Result	Rank	Result	Rank	Result	Rank	Result	Rank
José da Conceição	200 m	21.3	2 Q	21.5	7	did not advance			
Anubes da Silva	100 m	10.8	4	did not advance					
Anubes da Silva	400 m	48.0	4	did not advance					
Anubes da Silva	400 m hurdles	52.25	3	did not advance					

Field events

Athlete	Event	Qualification		Final	
Athlete	Event	Distance	Position	Distance	Position
Adhemar da Silva	Triple jump	15.61	13 Q	15.07	14

Women
Track & road events

Athlete	Event	Heat		Quarterfinal		Semifinal		Final	
Athlete	Event	Result	Rank	Result	Rank	Result	Rank	Result	Rank
Wanda dos Santos	80 m hurdles	11.84	4	did not advance					

== Basketball ==
=== Preliminary round ===
==== Group C ====
Team	Pld	W	L	PF	PA	PD	Pts
Brazil	3	3	0	213	198	+15	6
Soviet Union	3	2	1	220	170	+50	5
Mexico	3	1	2	189	210	−21	4
Puerto Rico	3	0	3	199	243	−44	3

August 26
20:00

Puerto Rico	72–75	Brazil
Scoring by half: 35–33, 37–42
Pts: Walle (22)		Pts: Pasos (18)

Palazzetto dello sport, Rome
Referees: P. Reverberi (Italy)
K. Klima (Czechoslovakia)

August 27
21:30

Soviet Union	54–58	Brazil
Scoring by half: 23–28, 31–30
Pts: Blatskauskas, Pasos (14)		Pts: Muzhniek (14)

Palazzetto dello sport, Rome
Referees: D. Shirley (United States)
E. Kassai (Hungary)

August 29
21:30

Brazil	80–72 ()	Mexico
Scoring by half: 29–32, 32–29 Overtime: 19–11
Pts: Pasos (19)		Pts: A. Herrera (22)

Palazzetto dello sport, Rome
Referees: E. Luglini (Italy)
C. Sien (Singapore)

=== Semifinals ===
Advance to the championship round
Relegated to 5th-8th place classification playoffs

==== Pool A ====
Team	Pld	W	L	PF	PA	PD	Pts
Brazil	3	3	0	240	221	+19	6
Italy	3	2	1	226	216	−10	5
Czechoslovakia	3	1	2	236	237	−1	4
Poland	3	0	3	211	239	−28	3

September 1
21:30

Brazil	78–75 (OT)	Italy
Scoring by half: 29–39, 41–31 Overtime: 8–5
Pts: Marques, Pasos (18)		Pts: Alesini (18)

Palazzetto dello sport, Rome
Referees: R. Klima (Switzerland)
B. Takev (Bulgaria)

September 2
20:00

Brazil	77–68	Poland
Scoring by half: 39–46, 38–22
Pts: Baumruk, Konecny (18)		Pts: Wichowski (24)

Palazzetto dello sport, Rome
Referees: B. Takev (Bulgaria)
Harvey (New Zealand)

September 3
21:30

Czechoslovakia	78–85	Brazil
Scoring by half: 30–43, 48–42
Pts: Baumruk (23)		Pts: Pasos (25)

Palazzetto dello sport, Rome
Referees: E. Alvarez Frausto (Mexico)
E. Kassai (Hungary)

==== Championship Round ====
Team	Pld	W	L	PF	PA	PD	Pts
United States	3	3	0	283	201	+82	6
Soviet Union	3	2	1	199	213	−14	5
Brazil	3	1	2	203	229	−26	4
Italy	3	0	3	226	268	−42	3

September 8
21:00

Brazil	62–64	Soviet Union
Scoring by half: 32–28, 30–36
Pts: Marques (25)		Pts: Voljnov (19)

Palazzo dello Sport, Rome
Referees: R. Weber (Switzerland)
Bilek (Turkey)

September 10
22:30

Brazil	63–90	United States
Scoring by half: 24–50, 39–40
Pts: Marques (19)		Pts: Lucas (23)

Palazzo dello Sport, Rome
Referees: E. Alvarez Frausto (Mexico)
E. Kassai (Hungary)

== Boxing ==
Men

Athlete	Event	1 Round	2 Round	3 Round	Quarterfinals	Semifinals	Final	
Athlete	Event	Opposition Result	Opposition Result	Opposition Result	Opposition Result	Opposition Result	Opposition Result	Rank
José Martins	Flyweight	BYE	Mircea Dobrescu (ROU); L 0–5	did not advance				
Waldomiro Pinto	Bantamweight	BYE	Oleg Grigoriew (URS); L 0–5	did not advance				
Jorge Salomão	Light welterweight	BYE	Miguel Amarista (VEN); L 2–3	did not advance				
Hélio Crescencio	Light middleweight	BYE	Michael Reid (IRL); L 1–4	did not advance				
José Leite	Light heavyweight	BYE	Rafael Gargiulo (ARG); L KO-1	did not advance				

== Cycling ==
One male cyclist represented Brazil in 1960.

=== Track ===
1000m time trial

Athlete	Event	Time	Rank
Anésio Argenton	1000m time trial	1:09.96	6

Men's Sprint

Athlete	Event	Heats	Repechage 1	Repechage 2	Round 2	Repechage 3	1/8 Finals	Quarterfinals	Semifinals	Final	
Athlete	Event	Time Speed (km/h)	Rank	Opposition Time Speed (km/h)	Opposition Time Speed (km/h)	Opposition Time Speed (km/h)	Opposition Time Speed (km/h)	Opposition Time Speed (km/h)	Opposition Time Speed (km/h)	Opposition Time Speed (km/h)	Rank
Anésio Argenton	Sprint	Sterckx (BEL); L	Barton (GBR); W12.3	Bodnieks (URS); Mucino (MEX); L	—N/a	—N/a	Baensch (AUS); Gasparella (ITA); W	Gaiardoni (ITA); L	did not advance		5

== Diving ==
Men

Athlete	Event	Preliminary		Final			
Athlete	Event	Points	Rank	Points	Rank	Total	Rank
Fernando Ribeiro	3 m springboard	49.27	22	did not advance			

== Equestrian ==
=== Show jumping ===
Athlete	Horse	Event	Round 1		Round 2		Final		
Athlete	Horse	Event	Penalties	Rank	Penalties	Rank	Total	Jump-off	Rank
Renyldo Ferreira	Marengo	Individual	50.00	44	did not advance		did not finish		
Mario Leite Neto	Biguaj	Individual	29.75	32	did not advance		did not finish		
Oscar da Silva	Eldorado	Individual	34.00	36	did not advance		did not finish		
Renyldo Ferreira; Mario Leite Neto; Oscar da Silva	See above	Team	AC	DNF	did not advance		did not finish		

== Football ==
=== First round ===
==== Group B ====
Pos	Team	Pld	W	D	L	GF	GA	GD	Pts	Qualification
1	Italy (H)	3	2	1	0	9	4	+5	5	Advanced to knockout stage
2	Brazil	3	2	0	1	10	6	+4	4	
3	Great Britain	3	1	1	1	8	8	0	3	
4	Formosa	3	0	0	3	3	12	−9	0	

Source: RSSSF
(H) Hosts
August 26, 1960
12:00

Brazil	4–3	Great Britain
Gérson 2'; China 61', 72'; Wanderley 64'	Report	Brown 32', 87'; Lewis 47'

Livorno, Stadio di Ardenza
Referee: Josef Kandlbinder (FRG)

August 29, 1960
12:00

Brazil	5–0	Taiwan
Gérson 13', 16', 47'; Roberto Dias 73', 87'	Report

Rome, Stadio Flaminio
Referee: E. Erlich (YUG)

September 1, 1960
12:00

Italy	3–1	Brazil
Rivera 69'; Rossano 70', 86'	Report	Didi 4'

Florence, Stadio Comunale
Referee: Pierre Schwinte (FRA)

== Modern pentathlon ==
Three male pentathletes represented Brazil in 1960.

Men

Athlete	Event	Riding (show jumping)	Fencing (épée one touch)	Shooting (25 m rapid-fire pistol)	Swimming (300 m freestyle)	Running (4000 m)	Total points	Final rank
Athlete	Event	Points	Points	Points	Points	Points	Total points	Final rank
Justo Botelho	Men's	718	724	840	940	1,048	4,270	27
Wenceslau Malta	Men's	1,066	586	860	750	919	4,181	32
José Wilson	Men's	433	448	800	920	919	3,520	50
Justo Botelho; Wenceslau Malta; José Wilson	Team	2,217	1,724	2,500	2,610	2,886	11,937	13

== Rowing ==
Brazil had five male rowers participate in one out of seven rowing events in 1960.

Men

Athlete	Event	Heats		Repechage		Semifinals		Final	
Athlete	Event	Time	Rank	Time	Rank	Time	Rank	Time	Rank
Harri Klein; Paulino Leite; Eduardo Endtner; Francisco Todesco; Waldemar Scovino	Coxed four	6:57.48	5 R	7:09.78	4	did not advance			

== Sailing ==
Open

Athlete	Event	Race														Final rank	
Athlete	Event	1		2		3		4		5		6		7		Final rank	
Athlete	Event	Score	Rank	Score	Rank	Score	Rank	Score	Rank	Score	Rank	Score	Rank	Score	Rank	Score	Rank
Reinaldo Conrad	Finn	~~15~~	~~469~~	3	1168	10	645	1	1645	10	645	18	390	11	604	5176	5
Richter Wolfgang Edgard; Roberto Ferreira Da Rosa	Flying Dutchman	21	270	17	362	20	291	23	231	21	270	~~DNS~~	~~0~~	DNS	0	1424	26
Jorge Pontual; Cid Nascimento	Star	10	516	~~13~~	~~482~~	9	562	6	738	8	613	11	475	9	562	3466	9

== Shooting ==
Three shooters represented Brazil in 1960.

Men

Athlete	Event	Qualification		Final	
Athlete	Event	Score	Rank	Score	Rank
Luiz Martins	50 m rifle, three positions	525	28	did not advance	
Luiz Martins	50 m rifle, prone	387	9 Q	577	33
Ambrosio Rocha	50 m pistol	—N/a		503	50
Ambrosio Rocha	25 m rapid fire pistol	—N/a		556	42
Álvaro dos Santos Filho	50 m pistol	—N/a		518	43

== Swimming ==
Men

Athlete	Event	Heat		Semifinal		Final	
Athlete	Event	Time	Rank	Time	Rank	Time	Rank
Fernando de Abreu	100 metre freestyle	1:00.1	5	did not advance			
Athos de Oliveira	100 metre backstroke	1:07.9	7	did not advance			
Aldo Perseke	200 metre butterfly	2:50.8	6	did not advance			
Manuel dos Santos Filho	100 metre freestyle	56.3	1 Q	56.3	1 Q	55.4	3rd place, bronze medalist(s)
Farid Zablith Filho	200 metre breaststroke	2:48.6	5	did not advance			
Athos de Oliveira; Farid Zablith Filho; Aldo Perseke; Fernando de Abreu	4 × 100 metre medley relay	4:30.1	6	did not advance			

== Water polo ==
=== First round ===
==== Group B ====
Team	Pld	W	D	L	GF	GA	GD	Pts
Soviet Union	3	3	0	0	20	10	+10	6
United Team of Germany	3	2	0	1	15	9	+6	4
Argentina	3	0	1	2	7	14	−7	1
Brazil	3	0	1	2	7	16	−9	1

Source: sports-reference.com
August 25, 1960
21:30

Brazil	2–2	Argentina
	(1:0)

Rome, Stadio Olimpico del Nuoto

August 26, 1960
21:00

Brazil	3–6	United Team of Germany
	(1:3)

Rome, Stadio Olimpico del Nuoto

August 29, 1960
12:00

Soviet Union	8–2	Brazil
	(5:1)

Rome, Stadio Olimpico del Nuoto

== Weightlifting ==
Men

Athlete	Event	Military Press		Snatch		Clean & Jerk		Total	Rank
Athlete	Event	Result	Rank	Result	Rank	Result	Rank	Total	Rank
Bruno Barabani	90 kg	120.0	15	117.5	14	152.5	14	390.0	15
