= Yugoslavia at the 1960 Summer Olympics =

- Flag of FPR Yugoslavia
- IOC code: YUG (JUG used at these Games)
- NOC: Yugoslav Olympic Committee

in Rome
- Competitors: 116 (107 men, 9 women) in 14 sports
- Flag bearer: Radovan Radović
- Medals Ranked 18th: Gold 1 Silver 1 Bronze 0 Total 2

Summer Olympics appearances (overview)
- 1920; 1924; 1928; 1932; 1936; 1948; 1952; 1956; 1960; 1964; 1968; 1972; 1976; 1980; 1984; 1988; 1992; 1996; 2000

Other related appearances
- Serbia (1912, 2008–pres.); Croatia (1992–pres.); Slovenia (1992–pres.); Bosnia and Herzegovina (1992 S–pres.); Independent Olympic Participants (1992 S); North Macedonia (1996–pres.); Serbia and Montenegro (1996–2006); Montenegro (2008–pres.); Kosovo (2016–pres.)

Athletes from the Federal People's Republic of Yugoslavia competed at the 1960 Summer Olympics in Rome, Italy. 116 competitors, 107 men and 9 women, took part in 64 events in 14 sports.

Yugoslavia had won silver medals in Men's Football (Soccer) for the past 3 Summer Games and finally won gold in Rome.

== Medalists ==
Medal	Name	Sport	Event
Gold	Andrija Anković; Vladimir Durković; Milan Galić; Fahrudin Jusufi; Tomislav Knez; Bora Kostić; Aleksandar Kozlina; Dušan Maravić; Željko Matuš; Željko Perušić; Novak Roganović; Velimir Sombolac; Milutin Šoškić; Silvester Takač; Blagoje Vidinić; Ante Žanetić	Football (Soccer)	Men's Team Competition
Silver	Branislav Martinović	Wrestling	Men's Greco-Roman Lightweight

== Competitors ==
The following is the list of Yugoslav competitors at the 1960 Olympic Games by sport.

Sport	Men	Women	Total
Athletics	17	5	22
Basketball	12	0	12
Boxing	4	0	4
Canoeing	3	0	3
Cycling	5	0	5
Fencing	1	1	2
Football	16	0	16
Gymnastics	6	3	9
Rowing	12	0	12
Sailing	3	0	3
Shooting	6	0	6
Swimming	9	0	9
Water polo	8	0	8
Wrestling	5	0	5
Total	107	9	116

== Athletics ==
Men's Marathon

- Franjo Škrinjar
  → 2:21.40 (10th place)
- Franjo Mihalić
  → 2:21:52 (12th place)

== Boxing ==
- Obrad Sretenović, (heavyweight, Fifth place tie)
- Featherweight, Men Miloslav Paunović =17
- Welterweight, Men Tomislav Kelava =17
- Light-Middleweight, Men Dragoslav Jakovljević =17

== Cycling ==
Five male cyclists represented Yugoslavia in 1960.

Individual road race

- Janez Žirovnik
- Ivan Levačić
- Nevenko Valčić
- Alojz Bajc

Team time trial

- Ivan Levačić
- Veselin Petrović
- Janez Žirovnik
- Nevenko Valčić

== Fencing ==
Two fencers, one man and one woman, represented Yugoslavia in 1960.

Men's sabre

- Aleksandar Vasin

Women's foil

- Vera Jeftimijades

== Rowing ==
Yugoslavia had 12 male rowers participate in four out of seven rowing events in 1960.

Men's double sculls

- Joža Lovec
- Perica Vlašić

Men's coxless pair

- Nikola Čupin
- Antun Ivanković

Men's coxed pair

- Paško Škarica
- Ante Vrčić
- Josip Bujas (cox)

Men's coxed four

- Vladimir Nekora
- Janez Pintar
- Adolf Potočar
- Vekoslav Skalak
- Nikola Stipanicev (cox)

== Shooting ==
Six shooters represented Yugoslavia in 1960.

50 m pistol

- Karlo Umek
- Ilija Ničić

300 m rifle, three positions

- Josip Ćuk
- Vladimir Grozdanović

50 m rifle, three positions

- Miroslav Stojanović
- Branislav Lončar

50 m rifle, prone

- Miroslav Stojanović
- Josip Ćuk

== Swimming ==
Men

Athlete	Event	Heat		Semifinal		Final	
Athlete	Event	Time	Rank	Time	Rank	Time	Rank
Gojko Arneri	100 m freestyle	1:00.5	39	Did not advance			
Janez Kocmur	100 m freestyle	58.7	28	Did not advance			
Milan Jeger	400 m freestyle	4:41.4	24	—N/a		Did not advance	
Veljko Rogošić	400 m freestyle	4:39.5	20	—N/a		Did not advance	
Slobodan Kićović	1500 m freestyle	20:29.0	29	—N/a		Did not advance	
Veljko Rogošić	1500 m freestyle	18:51.8	18	—N/a		Did not advance	
Mihovil Dorčić	100 m backstroke	1:06.0	=23	Did not advance			
Đorđe Perišić	200 m breaststroke	2:41.1	7 Q	2:44.2	16	Did not advance	
Lovro Radonić	200 m butterfly	3:00.6	34	Did not advance			
Veljko Rogošić	200 m butterfly	2:35.5	27	Did not advance			
Milan Jeger; Slobodan Kićović; Vlado Brinovec; Veljko Rogošić	4 × 200 m freestyle	8:49.8	13	—N/a		Did not advance	
Mihovil Dorčić; Đorđe Perišić; Veljko Rogošić; Janez Kocmur	4 × 100 m medley	4:25.5	13	—N/a		Did not advance	
