= Swimming at the 1960 Summer Olympics – Men's 4 × 200 metre freestyle relay =

Men's 4 × 200 metre freestyle relay at the Games of the XVII Olympiad
- Venue: Stadio Olimpico del Nuoto
- Dates: 29 August 1960 (heats); 1 September 1960 (final)
- Competitors: 67 from 15 nations
- Teams: 15
- Winning time: 8:10.2 WR

Medalists
1st place, gold medalist(s)		George Harrison, Dick Blick, Mike Troy, Jeff Farrell, Bill Darnton*, Tom Winters*, Steve Clark*	United States
2nd place, silver medalist(s)		Makoto Fukui, Hiroshi Ishii, Tsuyoshi Yamanaka, Tatsuo Fujimoto	Japan
3rd place, bronze medalist(s)		David Dickson, John Devitt, Murray Rose, John Konrads, John Rigby*, Allan Wood* *Indicates the swimmer only competed in the preliminary heats.	Australia

The men's 4 × 200 metre freestyle relay event at the 1960 Olympic Games took place August 29 — September 1. The relay featured teams of four swimmers each swimming four lengths of the 50 m pool freestyle.

== Results ==
=== Heats ===
Two heats were held; the fastest eight teams advanced to the Finals. The teams that advanced are highlighted.

==== Heat One ====
Place	Swimmers	Time	Notes
1	Tsuyoshi Yamanaka, Makoto Fukui, Hiroshi Ishii, Tatsuo Fujimoto (JPN)	8:17.1	
2	Hamilton Milton, John Martin-Dye, Richard Campion, Ian Black (GBR)	8:26.9	
3	Vitaly Sorokin, Gennady Nikolayev, Serhiy Tovstoplet, Boris Nik'it'ini (URS)	8:30.6	
3	Bengt-Olov Almstedt, Lars-Erik Bengtsson, Bengt Nordwall, Per-Ola Lindberg (SWE)	8:30.6	
5	Andrzej Salamon, Bernard Aluchna, Jerzy Tracz, Jan Lutomski (POL)	8:32.0	
6	Jean-Pascal Curtillet, Gérard Gropaiz, Marc Kamoun, Jean Boiteux (FRA)	8:41.2	
7	Peter Bärtschi, Rainer Goltzsche, Karl Fridlin, Hans-Ulrich Dürst (SUI)	9:18.1	
-	Horst-Günter Gregor, Gerhard Hetz, Frank Wiegand, Hans-Joachim Klein (GER)	DNS	

==== Heat Two ====
Place	Swimmers	Time	Notes
1	Bill Darnton, Tom Winters, Steve Clark, George Harrison (USA)	8:18.0	
2	David Dickson, John Rigby, Allan Wood, John Devitt (AUS)	8:24.2	
3	Frank Wiegand, Gerhard Hetz, Hans Zierold, Hans-Joachim Klein (GER)	8:29.4	
4	Ilkka Suvanto, Kari Haavisto, Stig-Olof Grenner, Karri Käyhkö (FIN)	8:29.7	
5	György Müller, László Lantos, Gyula Dobay, József Katona (HUN)	8:32.6	
6	Fritz Dennerlein, Bruno Bianchi, Angelo Romani, Paolo Galleti (ITA)	8:38.1	
7	Milan Jeger, Slobodan Kićović, Vlado Brinovec, Veljko Rogošić (YUG)	8:49.8	
8	Raúl Guzmán, Alfredo Guzmán, Jorge Escalante, Mauricio Ocampo (MEX)	8:50.4	

=== Final ===
Place	Swimmers	Time	Notes
1st place, gold medalist(s)	George Harrison, Dick Blick, Mike Troy, Jeff Farrell (USA)	8:10.2	WR
2nd place, silver medalist(s)	Makoto Fukui, Hiroshi Ishii, Tsuyoshi Yamanaka, Tatsuo Fujimoto (JPN)	8:13.2	
3rd place, bronze medalist(s)	David Dickson, John Devitt, Murray Rose, John Konrads (AUS)	8:13.8	
4	Hamilton Milton, John Martin-Dye, Richard Campion, Ian Black (GBR)	8:28.1	
5	Ilkka Suvanto, Kari Haavisto, Stig-Olof Grenner, Karri Käyhkö (FIN)	8:29.7	
6	Sven-Göran Johansson, Lars-Erik Bengtsson, Bengt Nordwall, Per-Ola Lindberg (SWE)	8:31.0	
7	Frank Wiegand, Gerhard Hetz, Hans Zierold, Hans-Joachim Klein (GER)	8:31.8	
8	Igor Luzhkovsky, Gennady Nikolayev, Vitaly Sorokin, Boris Nik'it'ini (URS)	8:32.8	
