= Claus Heß =

German rower and sports official (1933–2018)

Personal information
- Born: 23 June 1933 Düsseldorf, Germany
- Died: 2 April 2018 (aged 84)

Sport
- Sport: Rowing
Medal record
Men's rowing
Representing West Germany
European Rowing Championships
Gold medal – first place	1959 Mâcon	Coxed four

Claus Gert Heß (23 June 1933 – 2 April 2018) was a German Olympic rower and sports official.

== Early life ==
Heß was born in 1933 in Düsseldorf, Germany. His parents were Kurt and Hildegard Heß; his father was a merchant. He received his secondary education at the Lessing Gymnasium und Berufskolleg in his home town, and he graduated with his Abitur in 1953. He studied economics, first at the University of Cologne and then at the University of Würzburg, and he graduated from the latter in 1956. He received his doctorate in Würzburg in 1958.

In March 1957, Heß married Helga Schöll in Würzburg. They have two sons who were born in 1958 and 1966.

== Competitive rowing ==
While at school in 1947, he started rowing for RC Germania Düsseldorf 1904. A career highlight was representing the United Team of Germany at the 1956 Summer Olympics in Melbourne with the men's coxless pair where they were eliminated in the semi-final. He became European champion at the 1959 European Rowing Championships in Mâcon, France, with the coxed four; team members were Klaus Wegner, Gerd Cintl, Horst Effertz, and cox Michael Obst.

== Later career ==
From 1961, Heß took on roles for the German Rowing Association. At the age of 32, he was elected unanimously as president of the German Rowing Association as successor to Walter Wülfing; he held this role until 1983. From 1969, he was on the board of the Deutscher Sportbund, the German sports association. He was vice-president of the National Olympic Committee for Germany (since succeeded by the German Olympic Sports Confederation). Heß represented Germany on the International Rowing Federation (FISA) council since 1968, and he was FISA vice-president from 1979 until 1993. He was honorary president of the German Rowing Association until his death.
