= Hiroshi Ishii =

Hiroshi Ishii may refer to:

- Hiroshi Ishii (computer scientist), Japanese computer scientist
- Hiroshi Ishii (swimmer) (born 1939), Japanese swimmer and Olympic medalist
- Hiroshi Ishii (golfer) (1941–2006), Japanese professional golfer
