= Cravinho =

Cravinho is a Portuguese surname. Notable people with the surname include:

- João Cravinho (1936–2025), Portuguese politician
- João Gomes Cravinho (born 1964), Portuguese diplomat and politician, son of João Cravinho
- Jorge Cravinho (1933–?), Portuguese rower

== See also ==
- Cravinhos, a municipality in the state of São Paulo in Brazil
