= Sundén =

Sundén is a Swedish surname. On 31 December 2013, the number of people were residents Sweden with the spelling variants

- Sundén 1 182
- Sundeen 12

Together, this name is shared by 1,194 people.

Notable people with the surname include:

- Hjalmar Sundén (1908–1993), Swedish psychologist
- Reijo Sundén (born 1941), Finnish rower
