= Michael Obst =

Michael Obst may refer to:

- Michael Obst (rower)
- Michael Obst (composer)
