= Caminha =

- Municipality
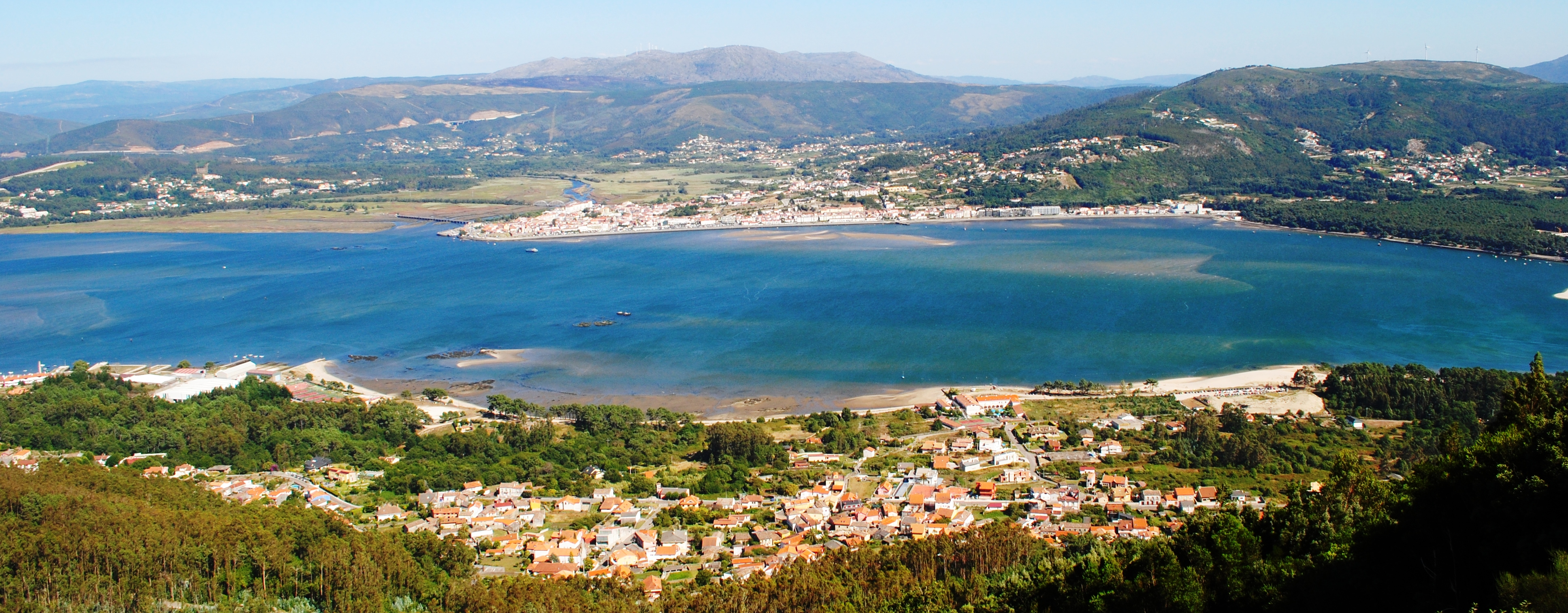

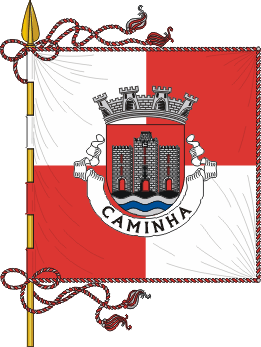
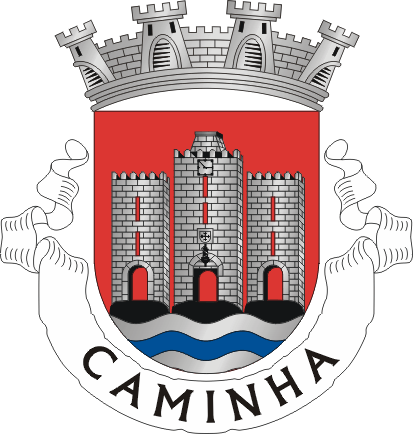
- Flag Coat of arms
- Interactive map of Caminha
- Location in Portugal
- Coordinates: 41°50′N 8°50′W
- Country: Portugal
- Region: Norte
- Intermunic. comm.: Alto Minho
- District: Viana do Castelo
- Parishes: 14

Government
  - President: Rui Lages (PS)

Area
  - Total: 136.52 km^{2} (52.71 sq mi)

Population (2021)
  - Total: 15,797
  - Density: 115.71/km^{2} (299.69/sq mi)
- Time zone: UTC+00:00 (WET)
  - Summer (DST): UTC+01:00 (WEST)
- Website: http://www.cm-caminha.pt

Caminha (Portuguese pronunciation: [kɐˈmiɲɐ]) is a town and a municipality in northwestern Portugal, located 21 kilometres (13 mi) north of Viana do Castelo, in Viana do Castelo District. In 2021, 2,373 people lived within the town of Caminha, and 15,797 lived in the municipality as a whole, in an area of 136.52 square kilometres (52.71 mi^{2}). Caminha municipality is subdivided into 14 civil parishes, including the town and parish of Vila Praia de Âncora. The parish Vilar de Mouros is well known for the oldest rock festival in Portugal.

The present Mayor is Rui Lages from the Socialist Party. The municipal holiday is Easter Monday.

== History ==
Despite Strabo's reference to Phoenician docks in the mouth of the Minho, no further evidence was found. An islet at the confluence of the Minho and Coura, now connected to the mainland, was the site of a small military settlement in Roman Gallaecia. Caminha was called Camenae or Camina during the period of Sueve dominationas part of the Kingdom of Galicia in the 5th century.

The area was depopulated due to Arab and Norman raids, and slowly reoccupied after the 10th century. Around 1060, during the reign of Ferdinand I of León, Caminha was the seat of the Caput Mini county and it is known that a castle existed in the area.

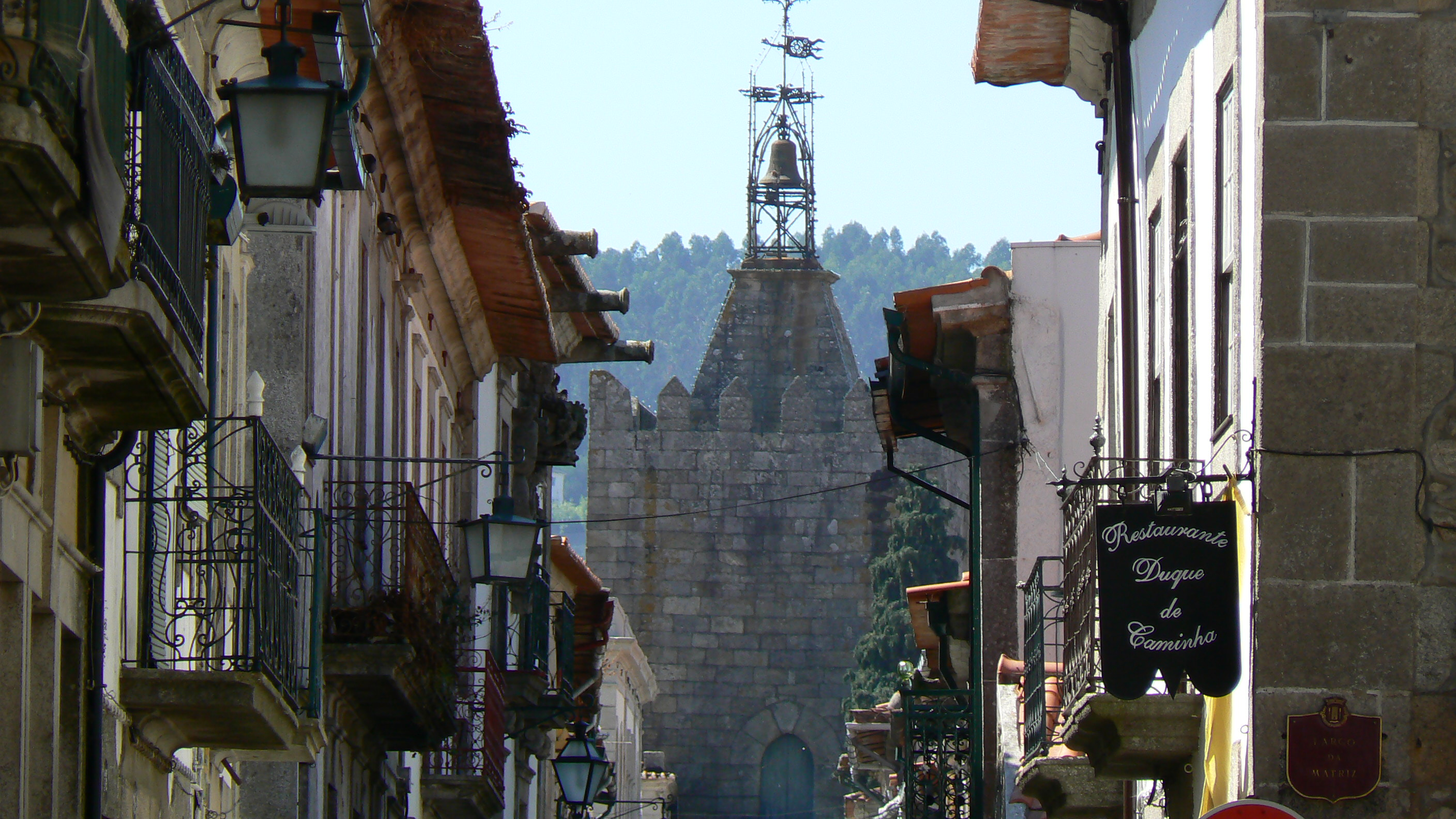
Caminha - Rua Direita, main street of the medieval old town.

In the 13th century, Caminha was just a fishing village until King Afonso III decided to build a modern castle and a fortified village following the bastide model, finished in 1260. At that time, the region was of great military importance, since it was located at the border with Galicia. The castle was later reinforced by Kings Dinis I, when reclaimed land finally connected the original island to the shore, and Ferdinand I. Although most of the walls and towers were torn down or built over, the oval shape of the castle is still clearly visible in the design of some streets, and the keep tower is still intact and serves as entrance to the historical centre. The pinewood of Camarido, stabilizing the sandbars at the mouth of the Minho, was another important initiative of Dinis I.

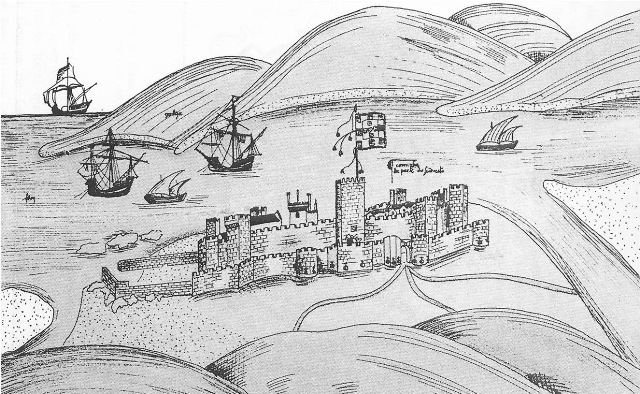
Caminha viewed from the South ("Livro das Fortalezas", 1510)

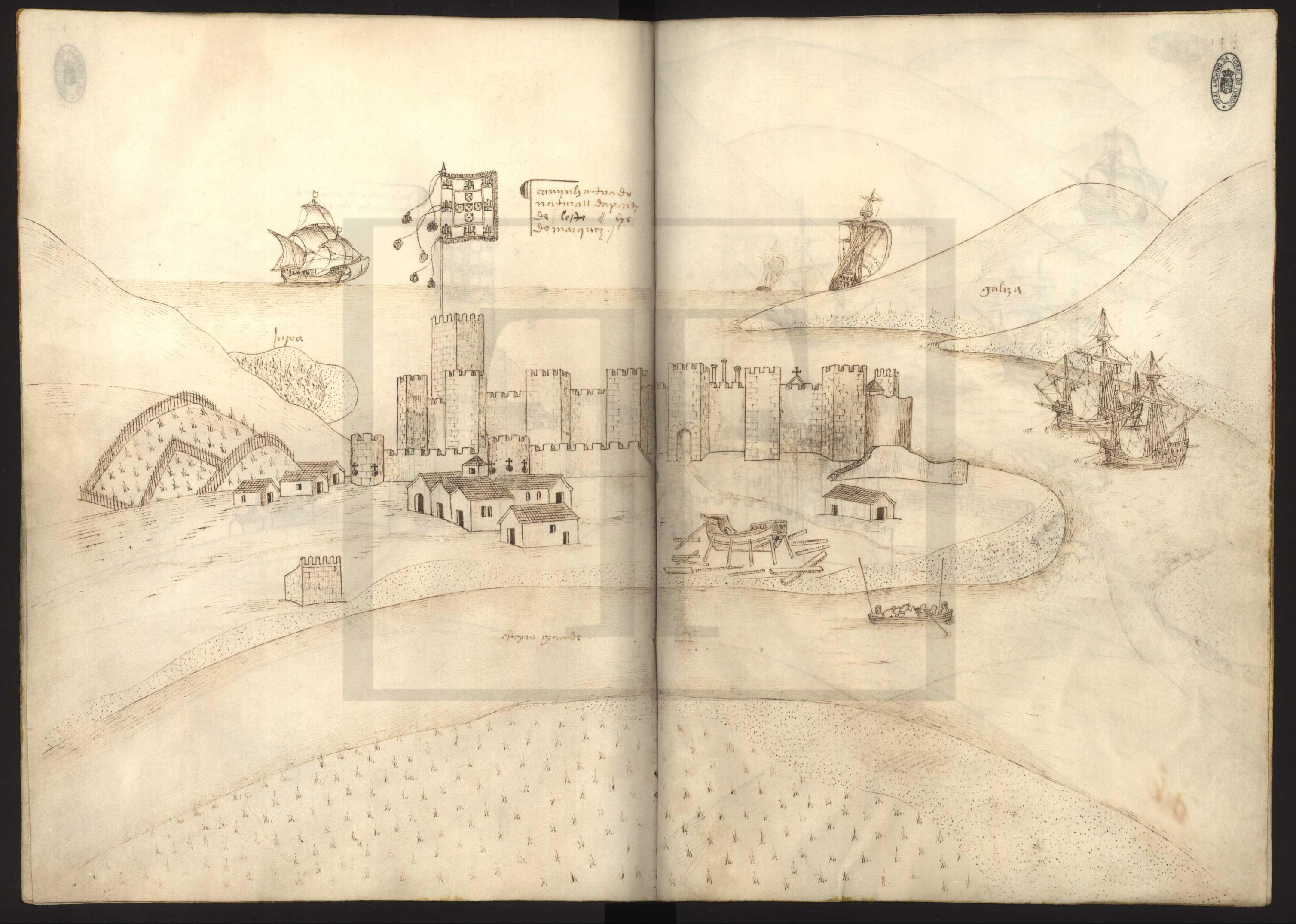
Caminha viewed from the East ("Livro das Fortalezas", 1510)

Caminha received its first royal charter (foral) from Dinis I in 1284. Caminha belonged to the crown until King Ferdinand I established in 1371 the County of Caminha, whose first count was Álvaro Pires de Castro. In 1390, King John I granted much freedom to the town (creating a póvoa marítima), leading maritime commerce to flourish. In the 15th and 16th centuries, it became one of the main ports in Northern Portugal, trading extensively with Northern Europe, Africa and India. A witness of this golden age is the main church (Igreja Matriz), built between the 15th and 16th centuries in an exuberant late Gothic-Renaissance mixed style. King Manuel I granted Caminha a new foral in 1512. King Manuel also rebuilt the Ínsua Fort (Forte da Ínsua), located in an island at sea and close to the village of Moledo.

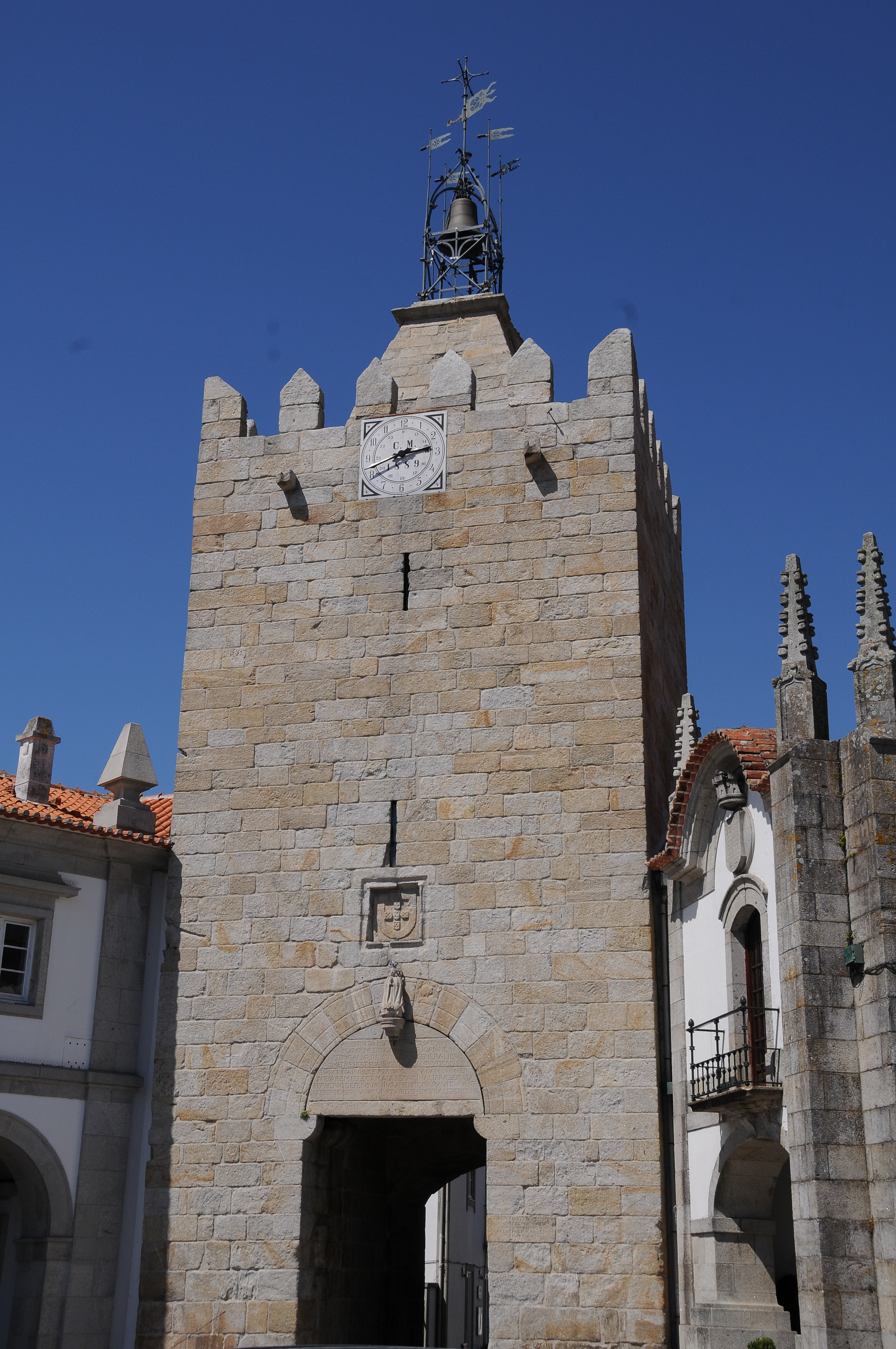
Old castle keep of Caminha, turned into a public clock tower in the 17th century. Its gate leads to the historical centre. The building to the right is the municipality.

After Portugal regained its independence from Spain in 1640, King John IV remodeled the fortifications of Caminha following modern ballistic advances. The Ínsua Fort was also remodeled. Together with the fortifications of Viana do Castelo, Valença, and Monção, the castle of Caminha was part of the defence line against the Castilians in the North.

With time, Caminha was superseded by Viana do Castelo in dominating maritime trade in Northern Portugal. Now Caminha lives from trade and tourism.

== Geography ==
Caminha municipality is located in the Alto Minho region and in Viana do Castelo district, in northwestern Portugal, on the border with Galicia, Spain. It is bounded by the municipalities of Viana do Castelo and Ponte de Lima to the south Vila Nova de Cerveira to the east, the Atlantic Ocean to the west, and the Minho River to the north, with the Spanish municipalities of A Guarda and O Rosal situated across the river. In the southern part of the municipality lies the Arga mountain range, a mountainous massif reaching 825 metres (2,707 ft) in altitude, of which 1,891 hectares (4,670 acres) are within Caminha.

The town of Caminha lies on the southern bank of the Minho estuary, near its confluence with the smaller Coura River, 2 kilometres (1.2 mi) from the Atlantic Ocean. The area is characterised by a broad estuary with sandbanks, wetlands, and riparian habitats, supporting a diverse birdlife, particularly wintering aquatic species. There is a second town within Caminha municipality, Vila Praia de Âncora, located by the Atlantic coast in the south of the municipality.

=== Parishes ===
Administratively, the municipality is divided into 14 civil parishes (freguesias):

- Âncora
- Arga (Baixo, Cima e São João)
- Argela
- Caminha (Matriz) e Vilarelho
- Dem
- Gondar e Orbacém
- Lanhelas
- Moledo e Cristelo
- Riba de Âncora
- Seixas
- Venade e Azevedo
- Vila Praia de Âncora
- Vilar de Mouros
- Vile

== Attractions ==
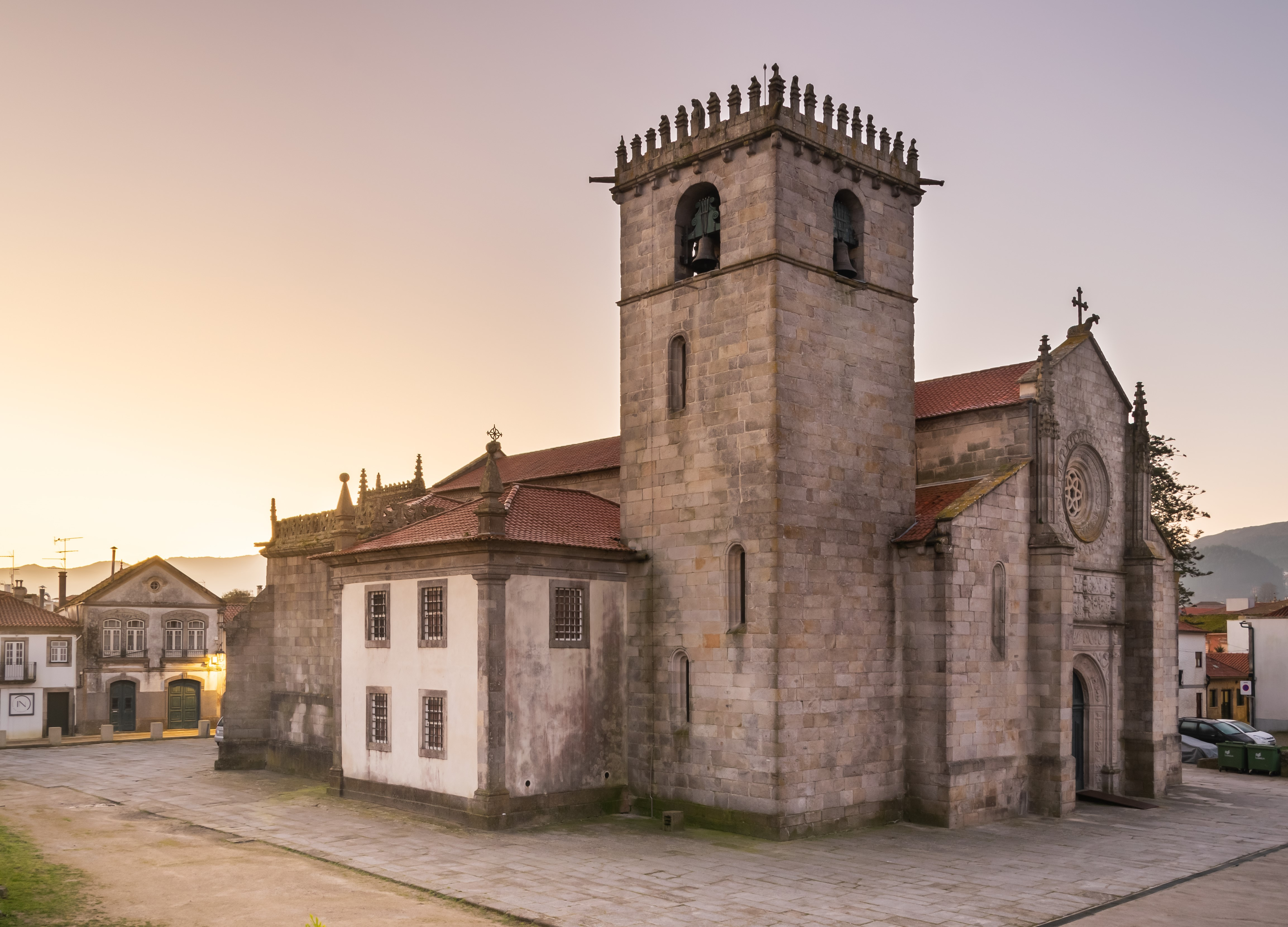
Mother Church of Caminha.

The Mother Church (Igreja Matriz) dates back to the 16th century and it illustrates the transition from Gothic to Renaissance in Portugal, with Manueline influence. Several architects from Northern Spain participated in its long construction. The outstanding timber roof in the interior has rich decoration showing Moorish influences (Mudéjar style).

Other major points of interest include the main square (Renaissance fountain of 1551), several Gothic and Renaissance houses in the old core and main square, and remains of medieval and 17th-century fortifications. Some pre-Roman archeological findings and ethnographic pieces are shown in the Municipal Museum. A weekly market is held every Wednesday and work from local coppersmiths and lacemakers can be found around town. Caminha is on the coastal part of the Portuguese Way path of the Camino de Santiago.

The Atlantic beaches in the area are wide and have good sand but tend to be windy for part of the day; the Moledo beach, located 4 kilometres (2.5 mi) southwest of the town of Caminha. River and sea excursions can be arranged with local fishermen.

The parish Vilar de Mouros is known for the oldest rock festival in Portugal.

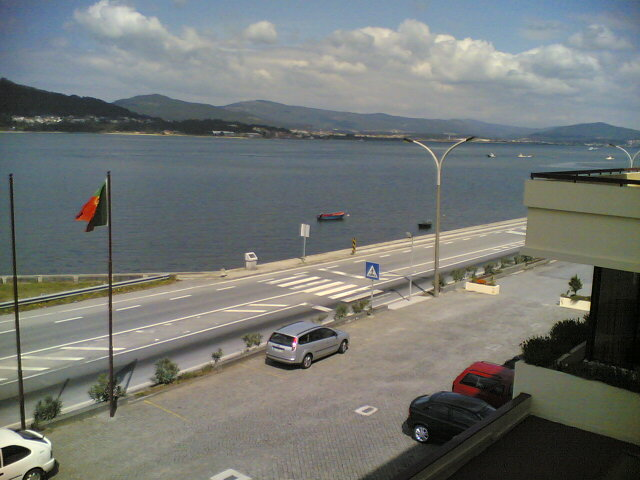
Caminha and the Minho river

Caminha municipality contains significant nature areas, such as its river estuaries and the Arga mountain range. The estuaries of the Minho and Coura rivers form a protected landscape of 3,392.6 hectares (8,383 acres), composed of wetlands, sandbanks, and reed beds that provide habitat for various bird species, particularly during the winter months. To the south, the Serra de Arga includes wetlands, river corridors, and mountain grasslands with a high presence of indigenous flora. Within this range stands the Romanesque Monastery of São João d’Arga, founded in the late 13th century and known for its annual pilgrimage held on 28 and 29 August.

== Population ==
Population of Caminha municipality (1801–2021)
1801	1849	1900	1930	1960	1981	1991	2001	2011	2021
9,251	12,167	15,288	15,810	16,688	15,883	16,207	17,069	16,684	15,797

== Infrastructure ==
Caminha is connected to northern Portugal and neighbouring Galicia, Spain, by a network of major roads. The A28 motorway runs along the Portuguese northern coast, linking the municipality with cities such as Viana do Castelo and Porto. National Road 13 follows the Atlantic coast and the southern bank of the Minho River, providing access to several local parishes as well as to Viana do Castelo, Vila Nova de Cervera and Valença. In Valença, it connects with the A3 motorway, which offers an inland route between Porto and the Alto Minho region, and with the A-55 motorway leading into Galicia.

Regional rail services are provided via the Minho Line, which connects Porto to Valença, with stops in Caminha and neighbouring municipalities including Viana do Castelo, Vila Nova de Cerveira and Valença. There are two stations within the town of Caminha, named Caminha and Senhora da Agonia, and four other in the parishes of Vila Praia de Âncora, Moledo, Seixas and Lanhelas (Esqueiro). From Valença or Viana do Castelo, it is possible to take long distance trains to Galicia or central Portugal.

Until 2020, Caminha was linked to A Guarda, Galicia, by the ferry Santa Rita de Cássia. This service was initially suspended due to COVID-19 restrictions and later because of the inoperability of the Spanish pontoon and the silting of the Minho River. In 2025, the ferry was moved to a shipyard in A Guarda for technical evaluation to determine whether it can resume operations, pending dredging of the river to ensure safe navigation.

The nearest airport is Porto Airport, approximately 91 kilometres (57 mi) south of Caminha.

== Notable people ==
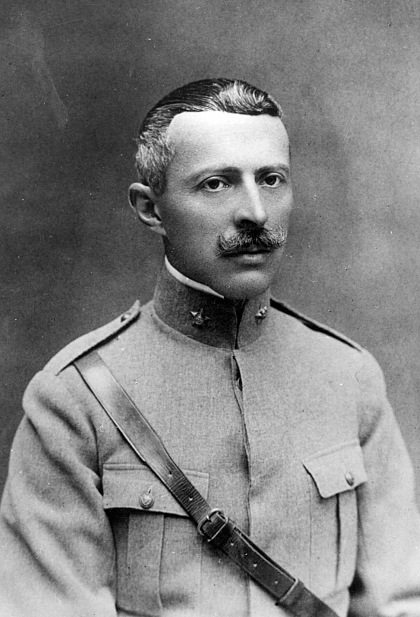
Sidónio Pais

- Quim Barreiros (born 1947) a Pimba musician known for his double entendre songs.
- Marina Gonçalves (born 1988) a politician and former Minister of Housing.
- João Lourenço Rebelo (1610–1661) a composer who adopted the Venetian polychoral style.
- Sidónio Pais (1872–1918) a politician, military officer, diplomat and the fourth President of the First Portuguese Republic.
- Marcos Soares Pereira (?–1655) a Portuguese composer.

=== Sport ===
- José Cancela (1925–2003) a rower who competed in the 1948 Olympics.
- Jorge Cravinho (born 1933) a rower who competed in the 1960 Olympics.
- José Porto (born 1933) a rower who competed in the 1960 Olympics.
- Ilídio Silva (born 1932) a rower who competed in the 1960 Olympics.
- Romeu Silva (born 1954) a former footballer with 252 club appearances and 11 caps.
- Rui Valença (born 1932) a rower who competed in the 1960 Olympics.
- José Vieira (born 1932) a rower who competed in the 1960 Olympics.

== International relations ==
Caminha is twinned with:

- Pontault-Combault (1978)
- Rădăuți (1998)
