= Henk Wamsteker =

Henk Wamsteker can refer to:

- Henk Wamsteker (footballer) (1900–1959), Dutch association footballer
- Henk Wamsteker (rower) (born 1936), Dutch Olympic rower
