= Roy Rubin =

Roy Rubin may refer to:

- Roy Rubin (basketball) (1925–2013), American former college and professional basketball coach
- Roy Rubin (rower) (born 1941), American rower
