= Gyula Lengyel (rowing) =

Hungarian rower

Personal information
- Born: 20 September 1931 Budapest, Hungary
- Died: 14 September 2000 (aged 68)
- Height: 168 cm (5 ft 6 in)
- Weight: 50 kg (110 lb)

Sport
- Sport: Rowing
Medal record
Men's rowing
Representing Hungary
European Championships
Bronze medal – third place	1956 Bled	Eight

Gyula Lengyel (20 September 1931 – 14 September 2000) was a Hungarian coxswain. He competed at the 1960 Summer Olympics in Rome with the men's coxed four where they came sixth.
