= Petre Milincovici =

Romanian rower (1936–2019)

Personal information
- Nationality: Romanian
- Born: 5 May 1936; Arad, Romania
- Died: 20 January 2019 (aged 82)

Sport
- Sport: Rowing

Petre Milincovici (5 May 1936 – 20 January 2019) was a Romanian rower. He competed in the men's coxed four event at the 1960 Summer Olympics.
