= José Méndez (rower) =

Spanish rower (1937–2021)

Personal information
- Nationality: Spanish
- Born: 9 May 1937; Pontevedra, Spain
- Died: 8 January 2021 (aged 83)

Sport
- Sport: Rowing

José Méndez (9 May 1937 – 8 January 2021) was a Spanish rower. He competed in the men's coxed four event at the 1960 Summer Olympics.
