= Monte Stocker =

American rower

Personal information
- Nationality: American
- Born: December 27, 1931 Seattle, Washington, United States
- Died: July 15, 2008 (aged 76) Tacoma, Washington, United States

Sport
- Sport: Rowing

Monte Stocker (December 27, 1931 – July 15, 2008) was an American rower. He competed in the men's coxed four event at the 1960 Summer Olympics.
