= Boris Fyodorov (rower) =

Soviet rower

Personal information
- Full name: Boris Dmitriyevich Fyodorov
- Born: 18 May 1931 Leningrad, Russian SFSR, Soviet Union
- Height: 182 cm (6 ft 0 in)
- Weight: 82 kg (181 lb)

Sport
- Sport: Rowing
Medal record
Men's rowing
Representing the Soviet Union
World Rowing Championships
Bronze medal – third place	1962 Lucerne	Coxed four
Bronze medal – third place	1966 Bled	Coxless pair
European Rowing Championships
Silver medal – second place	1953 Copenhagen	Coxed four
Silver medal – second place	1957 Duisburg	Eight
Bronze medal – third place	1958 Poznań	Eight
Bronze medal – third place	1959 Mâcon	Eight
Silver medal – second place	1961 Prague	Coxed four

Boris Fyodorov (Russian name: Борис Фёдоров; born 18 May 1931) is a Soviet rower. He had a long career, having won international medals between the ages of 22 and 35.

Fyodorov was born in Leningrad, now known as Saint Petersburg, in 1931. He competed at the 1952 Summer Olympics in Helsinki with the coxed four where his team was eliminated in the semi-finals repêchage. The following year, he won a silver medal at the 1953 European Rowing Championships in Copenhagen with the coxed four. At the 1956 Summer Olympics in Melbourne, he competed with the men's eight and the team was eliminated in the semi-finals. He continued to row with the eight and won silver at the 1957 European Rowing Championships in Duisburg, and bronze medals in the two subsequent years.

Fyodorov competed at the 1960 Summer Olympics in Rome with the men's coxed four where they came fourth. At the 1961 European Rowing Championships in Prague, the coxed four won a silver medal. At the inaugural 1962 World Rowing Championships in Lucerne, his coxed four team won bronze. At the next World Championships in 1966 in Bled, he won a bronze medal in the coxless pair.
