= Klaus Riekemann =

German rower

Personal information
- Born: 19 May 1940 (age 86)
- Height: 192 cm (6 ft 4 in)
- Weight: 87 kg (192 lb)

Sport
- Sport: Rowing
- Club: RC Germania Düsseldorf
Medal record
Men's rowing
Representing Germany
Gold medal – first place	1960 Rome	Coxed four
European Rowing Championships
Representing West Germany
Gold medal – first place	1958 Poznań	Coxed pair
Gold medal – first place	1959 Mâcon	Coxed pair
Bronze medal – third place	1961 Prague	Coxless four

Klaus Riekemann (born 19 May 1940) is a rower who competed for the United Team of Germany as a West German in the 1960 Summer Olympics.

He was born in Dorsten, though he lived most of his life in Marl, before moving around Europe and America.

In the coxed pair, he was European champion in both 1958 and 1959. He was a crew member of the German boat which won the gold medal in the coxed four event at the 1960 Summer Olympics. It was after this event that Riekemann made it into the newspapers due to an unfortunate accident. Whilst warming down after his event, he was jumping on a trampoline and misjudged his landing and badly shattered his ankle. His recuperation took a while at an Italian hospital near to Lake Como where the regatta took place.

He rowed at the European Championships. At the 1961 European Rowing Championships, he won a bronze medal in the coxless four. He was also present in the east side of Berlin at the building of the Berlin Wall.
