= Oldřich Tikal =

Czech rower (born 1938)

Personal information
- Born: 28 November 1938 (age 87) Prague, Czechoslovakia
- Height: 173 cm (5 ft 8 in)
- Weight: 78 kg (172 lb)

Sport
- Sport: Rowing
Medal record
Men's rowing
Representing Czechoslovakia
European Rowing Championships
| Bronze medal – third place | 1963 Copenhagen | Eight |

Oldřich Tikal (born 28 November 1938) is a Czech rower who represented Czechoslovakia. He competed at the 1960 Summer Olympics in Rome with the men's coxed four where they were eliminated in the semi-finals.
