= Mike Yonker =

American rower (born 1940)

Personal information
- Nationality: American
- Born: November 12, 1940 (age 85) Seattle, Washington, United States

Sport
- Sport: Rowing

Mike Yonker (born November 12, 1940) is an American rower. He competed in the men's coxed four event at the 1960 Summer Olympics.
