= Petr Pulkrábek =

Czech rower (born 1939)

Personal information
- Born: 4 May 1939 (age 86); Prague, Protectorate of Bohemia and Moravia
- Education: chemical engineer PhD
- Years active: 11
- Height: 175 cm (5 ft 9 in)
- Weight: 83 kg (183 lb)
- Spouse: Jana Pulkrabek

Sport
- Sport: Rowing
- Club: Blesk Prague and Dukla prague

Petr Pulkrábek (born 4 May 1939) is a Czech rower who represented Czechoslovakia. He competed at the 1960 Summer Olympics in Rome with the men's coxed four where they were eliminated in the semi-finals.
