= Naotake Okubo =

Japanese rower (born 1940)

Personal information
- Nationality: Japanese
- Born: 16 March 1940 (age 85); Hokkaido, Japan

Sport
- Sport: Rowing

Naotake Okubo (born 16 March 1940) is a Japanese rower. He competed in the men's coxed four event at the 1960 Summer Olympics.
