= Triantafyllos Tsongas =

Greek rower (born 1938)

Personal information
- Nationality: Greek
- Born: 23 October 1938 (age 86); Kozani, Greece

Sport
- Sport: Rowing

Triantafyllos Tsongas (born 23 October 1938) is a Greek rower. He competed in the men's coxed four event at the 1960 Summer Olympics.
