= Osamu Saito =

Japanese rower (born 1938)

Personal information
- Nationality: Japanese
- Born: 12 June 1938 (age 86); Osaka Prefecture, Japan

Sport
- Sport: Rowing

Osamu Saito (斎藤 修, Saitō Osamu, born 12 June 1938) is a Japanese rower. He competed in the men's coxed four event at the 1960 Summer Olympics.
