= Terrence Rosslyn-Smith =

British rower (born 1940)

Terence Rosslyn-Smith
Personal information
- Nationality: British
- Born: 28 March 1940 (age 85); London, England

Sport
- Sport: Rowing

Terence Rosslyn-Smith (born 28 March 1940) is a British rower. He competed in the men's coxed four event at the 1960 Summer Olympics. Appointed MBE in 2003 “for services to the disadvantaged.”
