= Koji Fukuda =

Japanese rower (born 1940)

Personal information
- Nationality: Japanese
- Born: 23 August 1940 (age 84); Tottori, Japan

Sport
- Sport: Rowing

Koji Fukuda (born 23 August 1940) is a Japanese rower. He competed in the men's coxed four event at the 1960 Summer Olympics.
