= Serhiy Tovstoplet =

Ukrainian swimmer

Personal information
- Nationality: Ukrainian
- Born: 6 March 1937 Kirovohrad, Soviet Union
- Died: 23 January 2017 (aged 79)

Sport
- Sport: Swimming

Serhiy Tovstoplet (6 March 1937 – 23 January 2017) was a Ukrainian swimmer. He competed in the men's 4 × 200 metre freestyle relay at the 1960 Summer Olympics for the Soviet Union.
