= José Porto =

Portuguese rower (born 1933)

Personal information
- Nationality: Portuguese
- Born: 5 January 1933; Caminha, Portugal

Sport
- Sport: Rowing

José Porto (born 5 January 1933, date of death unknown) was a Portuguese rower. He competed in the men's coxed four event at the 1960 Summer Olympics. Porto died before 2018.
