= Marc Kamoun =

French swimmer

Personal information
- Nationality: French
- Born: 7 November 1937 (age 88) Algiers, French Algeria

Sport
- Sport: Swimming

Marc Kamoun (born 7 November 1937) is a French former swimmer. He competed in the men's 4 × 200 metre freestyle relay at the 1960 Summer Olympics.
