= José Vieira (rower) =

Portuguese rower

Personal information
- Nationality: Portuguese
- Born: 22 October 1932; Caminha, Portugal
- Died: 10 March 2022 (aged 89)

Sport
- Sport: Rowing

José Vieira (22 October 1932 – 10 March 2022) was a Portuguese rower. He competed in the men's coxed four event at the 1960 Summer Olympics.
