= Ilias Polyzois =

Greek rower (born 1939)

Personal information
- Nationality: Greek
- Born: 15 October 1939 (age 85); Piraeus, Greece

Sport
- Sport: Rowing

Ilias Polyzois (born 15 October 1939) is a Greek rower. He competed in the men's coxed four event at the 1960 Summer Olympics.
