= Alberto Valtierra =

Spanish rower

Personal information
- Full name: Alberto Valtierra Martínez
- Nationality: Spanish
- Born: 19 September 1931; Vigo, Spain
- Died: 15 February 2013 (aged 81); Madrid, Spain

Sport
- Sport: Rowing

Alberto Valtierra Martínez (Note: In this Spanish name, the first or paternal surname is Valtierra and the second or maternal family name is Martínez.) (19 September 1931 – 15 February 2013) was a Spanish rower. He competed in the men's coxed four event at the 1960 Summer Olympics.
