= Gerd Cintl =

German rower

Personal information
- Born: 11 December 1938 Düsseldorf, Germany
- Died: 26 December 2017 (aged 79) Düsseldorf, Germany

Sport
- Sport: Rowing
- Club: Ruderclub Germania Düsseldorf
Medal record
Men's rowing
Olympic Games
Representing Germany
Gold medal – first place	1960 Rome	Coxed four
European Championships
Representing West Germany
Silver medal – second place	1958 Poznań	Coxless pair
Gold medal – first place	1959 Mâcon	Coxed four

Gerd Cintl (11 December 1938 – 26 December 2017) was a West German rower who competed for the United Team of Germany in the 1960 Summer Olympics.

He was born in Düsseldorf in 1938. At the 1958 European Rowing Championships in Poznań, he won silver in the coxless pair with Horst Effertz. At the 1959 European Rowing Championships in Mâcon, he won gold with the coxed four. In 1960 he was a crew member of the German boat which won the gold medal at the Summer Olympics in the coxed four event. He died on 26 December 2017 in Düsseldorf at the age of 79.
