= Giovanni Zucchi =

Italian rower (1931–2021)

Personal information
- Born: 14 August 1931 Mandello del Lario, Italy
- Died: 19 January 2021 (aged 89)
- Height: 167 cm (5 ft 6 in)

Sport
- Sport: Rowing
Medal record
Men's rowing
Representing Italy
Bronze medal – third place	1960 Rome	Coxed four
European Rowing Championships
Gold medal – first place	1954 Amsterdam	Coxless four
Gold medal – first place	1956 Bled	Coxless four
Gold medal – first place	1957 Duisburg	Eight
Gold medal – first place	1958 Poznań	Eight
Gold medal – first place	1961 Prague	Eight
Silver medal – second place	1963 Copenhagen	Coxless four
Bronze medal – third place	1964 Amsterdam	Coxless four

Giovanni Zucchi (14 August 1931 – 19 January 2021) was an Italian rower who competed in the 1956, 1960, and the 1964 Summer Olympics, winning bronze in 1960. He won five gold medals at European Rowing Championships.

Zucchi was born in Mandello del Lario.

At the 1954 European Rowing Championships, Zucchi won gold with the coxless four. At the 1956 European Rowing Championships, Zucchi regained his European title. Later that year, he was a crew member of the Italian boat that finished fourth in the coxless four event at the 1956 Summer Olympics.

For the 1957 European Rowing Championships, Zucchi changed to the eight and won gold; he repeated this success at the 1958 European Rowing Championships. At the 1960 Summer Olympics, he won the bronze medal with the Italian boat in the coxed four competition.

For the 1961 European Rowing Championships, Zucchi was back in the eight and they won gold. At the 1963 European Rowing Championships, he was part of the coxless four that won silver. At the 1964 European Rowing Championships, his coxless four won bronze. At the 1964 Summer Olympics, he was part of the Italian boat that finished fifth in the coxless four event.
