= John Hudson (rower) =

Australian rower (1940–2024)

Personal information
- Nationality: Australian
- Born: 4 August 1940; Sydney, Australia
- Died: 16 March 2024 (aged 83)

Sport
- Sport: Rowing

John Hudson (4 August 1940 – 16 March 2024) was an Australian representative rower. He competed in the men's coxed four event at the 1960 Summer Olympics.

== Club and state rowing ==
Hudson's senior rowing was from Mosman Rowing Club in 1959 and 1960. In 1961 he moved to the Leichhardt Rowing Club where he was club captain in 1964.

Hudson first made state selection for New South Wales in the 1959 men's senior eight which contested and won the King's Cup at the 1959 Australian Interstate Regatta. He made further King's Cup appearances for New South Wales in 1960, 1963 and 1964.

At the second ever Australian Rowing Championships held in 1964, Hudson contested the national coxless fours title in Leichhardt colours. That crew placed second.

== International representative rowing ==
For the 1960 Rome Olympics the selected Australian eight was the winning King's Cup West Australian eight. A coxed four was selected as the fourth priority boat and a New South Wales four was picked with Hudson in the stroke seat. In Rome they were the only Australian crew to make the Olympic final and finished in fifth place.
