= Bill Darnton =

American swimmer

Personal information
- Full name: William Thomas Darnton
- Nickname: "Bill"
- National team: United States
- Born: June 16, 1940 (age 86) Flint, Michigan, U.S.
- Height: 6 ft 1 in (1.85 m)
- Weight: 163 lb (74 kg)

Sport
- Sport: Swimming
- Strokes: Freestyle
- Club: Detroit Athletic Club
- College team: University of Michigan

William Thomas Darnton (born June 16, 1940) is an American former competition swimmer who represented the United States at the 1960 Summer Olympics in Rome, Italy. Darnton swam for the gold medal-winning U.S. team in the qualifying heats of the men's 4×200-meter freestyle relay. He did not receive a medal, however, because under the Olympic swimming rules in effect in 1960, only relay swimmers who competed in the event final were medal-eligible.

== See also ==
- List of University of Michigan people

Darnton was captain of the University of Michigan 1962 Swimming Team where he earned a B.S. in engineering. He was a member of the Tau Beta Pi academic honorary and a two-time winner of the Fielding H. Yost Award for Michigan's Outstanding Student-Athlete. He broke NCAA records in the 220 and 440 yard freestyle events and Michigan's teams finished 1st (twice), 2nd and 4th in his four years there. He received an MBA from the University of California, Berkeley, was a Managing Partner at Andersen Consulting (now Accenture) and President of the Chicago Athletic Association.
