= Mauno Maisala =

Finnish rower

Personal information
- Nationality: Finnish
- Born: 26 August 1933 Koivisto, Finland
- Died: 27 December 2009 (aged 76)

Sport
- Sport: Rowing

Mauno Maisala (26 August 1933 – 27 December 2009) is a Finnish rower. He competed in the men's coxed four event at the 1964 Summer Olympics. His brother Matti was also a rower.
