= John Rigby (swimmer) =

Australian swimmer (1942–2022)

Personal information
- Born: 21 August 1942 Brisbane, Queensland, Australia
- Died: 13 June 2022 (aged 79)

Sport
- Sport: Swimming
- Strokes: Freestyle

John Rigby (21 August 1942 – 13 June 2022) was an Australian swimmer. He competed in the men's 4 × 200 metre freestyle relay at the 1960 Summer Olympics.
