= Franco Cobas =

Spanish rower

Personal information
- Nationality: Spanish
- Born: 18 May 1939 (age 85); Boiro, Spain

Sport
- Sport: Rowing

Franco Cobas (born 18 May 1939) is a Spanish rower. He competed in the men's coxed four event at the 1960 Summer Olympics.
