= Tibor Bedekovits =

Hungarian rower

Personal information
- Born: 24 September 1930 Baja, Hungary
- Died: 6 April 1999 (aged 68)
- Height: 188 cm (6 ft 2 in)
- Weight: 90 kg (198 lb)

Sport
- Sport: Rowing
Medal record
Men's rowing
Representing Hungary
European Championships
Bronze medal – third place	1956 Bled	Eight

Tibor Bedekovits (24 September 1930 – 6 April 1999) was a Hungarian rower. He competed at the 1960 Summer Olympics in Rome with the men's coxed four where they came sixth.
