= Hatsuhiko Mizuki =

Japanese rower (born 1939)

Personal information
- Nationality: Japanese
- Born: 12 August 1939 (age 86) Akita, Japan

Sport
- Sport: Rowing

Hatsuhiko Mizuki (born 12 August 1939) is a Japanese rower. He competed in the men's coxed four event at the 1960 Summer Olympics.
