= 1959 European Rowing Championships =

- Venue: Mâcon regatta course
- Location: Mâcon, France
- Dates: 14–16 August 1959 (women); 20–23 August 1959 (men)

The 1959 European Rowing Championships were rowing championships held on the Mâcon regatta course on the Saône in Mâcon, France. The event for women was held from 14 to 16 August, and 16 races were held. The event for men was held from 20 to 23 August. Men competed in all seven Olympic boat classes (M1x, M2x, M2-, M2+, M4-, M4+, M8+), and women entered in five boat classes (W1x, W2x, W4x+, W4+, W8+).

== Medal summary – women's events ==
Event	Gold		Silver		Bronze	
Event	Country & rowers	Time	Country & rowers	Time	Country & rowers	Time
W1x	Hungary; Kornélia Pap		Soviet Union; Emiliya Mukhina		Austria; Eva Sika	
W2x	Soviet Union; Nina Opalenko; Lyudmila Otrosko		Romania; Magda Jifcu; Dora Lakatos		Czechoslovakia; Svetla Bartakova; Hana Musilova	
W4+	Soviet Union; Valentina Terekhova; Nadezhda Skunkova; Ella Sergeyeva; Nina Shamanova; Viktoriya Dobrodeeva (cox)		Romania; Felicia Urziceanu; Maria Trinks; Stela Gavan-Georgescu; Marta Kardos; Stefania Borisov (cox)		Hungary; Alajosne Labody; Gyözöne Lukachich; Zsuzsa Rakitay; Ottone Nagy; Rudolfne Radvanyi (cox)	
W4x+	Soviet Union; Olimpiada Mikhaylova; Valentina Kalegina; Galina Putyrskaya; Larisa Pisareva; Zinaida Andreyeva (cox)		East Germany; Herta Weissig; Gisela Heisse; Hannelore Göttlich; Helga Richter; Hannelore Schneider (cox)		Romania; Magda Jifcu; Emilia Rigard; Doina Ciolacu; Stela Stanciu; Angela Codreanu (cox)	
W8+	Soviet Union; Valentina Sirsikova; Vera Rebrova; Nonna Petsernikova; Lidiya Zontova; Sinayda Kirillina; Nina Korobkova; Zinaida Korotova; Nadezhda Gontsarova; Viktoriya Dobrodeeva (cox)		East Germany; Anita Blankenfeld; Ingeborg Peter; Ingrid Drews; Waltraud Dinter; Hilde Amelang; Marianne Schulze; Hella Schulz; Marianne Falk; Ursula Wiek (cox)		Hungary; Alajosne Labody; Maria Zakaly; Laszlone Halasz; Magda Helmich; Judit Szalatnay; Zsuzsa Rakitay; Gyözöne Lukachich; Ottone Nagy; Rudolfne Radvanyi (cox)	

== Medal summary – men's events ==
Event	Gold		Silver		Bronze	
Event	Country & rowers	Time	Country & rowers	Time	Country & rowers	Time
M1x	Soviet Union; Vyacheslav Ivanov		West Germany; Klaus von Fersen		Poland; Teodor Kocerka	
M2x	Soviet Union; Aleksandr Berkutov; Yuriy Tyukalov		Czechoslovakia; Václav Kozák; Pavel Schmidt		Netherlands; Peter Bakker; Co Rentmeester	
M2-	West Germany; Ingo Kliefoth; Bernd Kruse		Soviet Union; Oleg Golovanov; Valentin Boreyko		Austria; Alfred Sageder; Josef Kloimstein	
M2+	West Germany; Klaus Riekemann; Hans-Joachim Berendes; Hans-Dieter Maier (cox)		Italy; Renzo Ostino; Giovanni Anselmi; Vincenzo Bruno (cox)		Romania; Stelian Petrov; Ion Voican; Oprea Păunescu (cox)	
M4-	Switzerland; Gottfried Kottmann; Rolf Streuli; Émile Ess; Hansruedi Scheller		West Germany; Günter Schroers; Manfred Uellner; Victor Hendrix; Manfred Kluth		Czechoslovakia; Ludek Musil; René Líbal; Miroslav Jíška; Jindřich Blažek	
M4+	West Germany; Klaus Wegner; Gerd Cintl; Horst Effertz; Claus Heß; Michael Obst (cox)		Netherlands; Maarten Christiaan Fehmers; Cornelis Jacobus Westermann; Peter van Haaps; Feye Meye; Ivan Vanier (cox)		Sweden; Kjell Hansson; Ulf Gustafsson; Lennart Hansson; Lars-Eric Gustafsson; Bengt Gunnarsson (cox)	
M8+	West Germany; Hans Lenk; Karl-Heinz Hopp; Klaus Bittner; Karl-Heinrich von Groddeck; Kraft Schepke; Frank Schepke; Walter Schröder; Manfred Rulffs; Willi Padge (cox)		Czechoslovakia; Pavel Hofmann; Václav Jindra; Bohumil Janoušek; Jan Švéda; Josef Švec; Luděk Pojezný; Jan Jindra; Stanislav Lusk; Miroslav Koníček (cox)		Soviet Union; Igor Khokhlov; Boris Fyodorov; Georgy Gushchenko; Anatoly Antonov; Yury Popov; Yaroslav Cherstvy; Georgiy Bryulgart; Oleg Vasiliev; Yuri Polyakov (cox)	
