= Claude Martin (rower) =

French rower (1930–2017)

Personal information
- Born: 6 February 1930 Paris
- Died: 5 December 2017 (aged 87)

Sport
- Sport: Rowing
Medal record
Men's rowing
Representing France
Olympic Games
Silver medal – second place	1960 Rome	Coxed four
European Rowing Championships
Gold medal – first place	1953 Copenhagen	Coxed pair
Bronze medal – third place	1955 Ghent	Coxed pair
Mediterranean Games
Gold medal – first place	1955 Barcelona	Coxed pair

Claude Auguste Martin (French pronunciation: [klod ogyst maʁtɛ̃]; 6 February 1930 – 5 December 2017) was a French rower who competed in the 1952 Summer Olympics and in the 1960 Summer Olympics.

He was born in Paris. In 1952, he was a crew member of the French boat eliminated in the semi-finals of the coxed four event. Eight years later, he won the silver medal with the French boat in the coxed four competition. His death was announced on 13 December 2017. He was 87.
