= Emilio García (rower) =

Spanish rower

Personal information
- Nationality: Spanish
- Born: 24 November 1938 (age 86); Vigo, Spain

Sport
- Sport: Rowing

Emilio García (born 24 November 1938) is a Spanish rower. He competed in the men's coxed four event at the 1960 Summer Olympics.
