= Ilídio Silva =

Portuguese rower

Personal information
- Nationality: Portuguese
- Born: 23 January 1932; Caminha, Portugal

Sport
- Sport: Rowing

Ilídio Silva (23 January 1932 – before 2018) was a Portuguese rower. He competed in the men's coxed four event at the 1960 Summer Olympics.
