= Ype Stelma =

Dutch rower

Personal information
- Nationality: Dutch
- Born: 12 January 1936; Rotterdam, Netherlands
- Died: 27 May 2022 (aged 86)

Sport
- Sport: Rowing

Ype Juurd Stelma (12 January 1936 – 27 May 2022) was a Dutch rower. He competed in the men's coxed four event at the 1960 Summer Olympics. Stelma studied at the University of Leiden, and the Dutch rowing team was the University of Leiden team. He migrated to Norway in 1967 and settled as district physician in Hvaler.
