= Max Annett =

Australian rower

Personal information
- Nationality: Australian
- Born: 6 February 1931 New South Wales, Australia
- Died: 6 July 2015 (aged 84)

Sport
- Sport: Rowing
- Club: Leichhardt Rowing Club

Achievements and titles
- Olympic finals: Coxed four Rome 1960
- National finals: King's Cup 1958-59.

Max Annett (6 February 1931 – 6 July 2015) was an Australian representative rower. He competed in the men's coxed four event at the 1960 Summer Olympics.

== Club and state rowing ==
Annett took up rowing at the Nepean Rowing Club and then rowed in Sydney at Leichhardt Rowing Club.

Annett was selected in New South Wales state representative men's senior eights contesting the King's Cup at the Interstate Regatta within the Australian Rowing Championships in 1958 and 1959 and was a reserve for the 1960 crew. The 1959 NSW eight won the King's Cup.

== International representative rowing ==
For the 1960 Rome Olympics the Australian eight was the winning King's Cup West Australian eight. A coxed four was selected as the fourth priority boat and a New South Wales based four was picked with Annett in the bow seat. In Rome they were the only Australian crew to make their Olympic A final and finished in fifth place.
