= Robert Dumontois =

French rower (1941–2022)

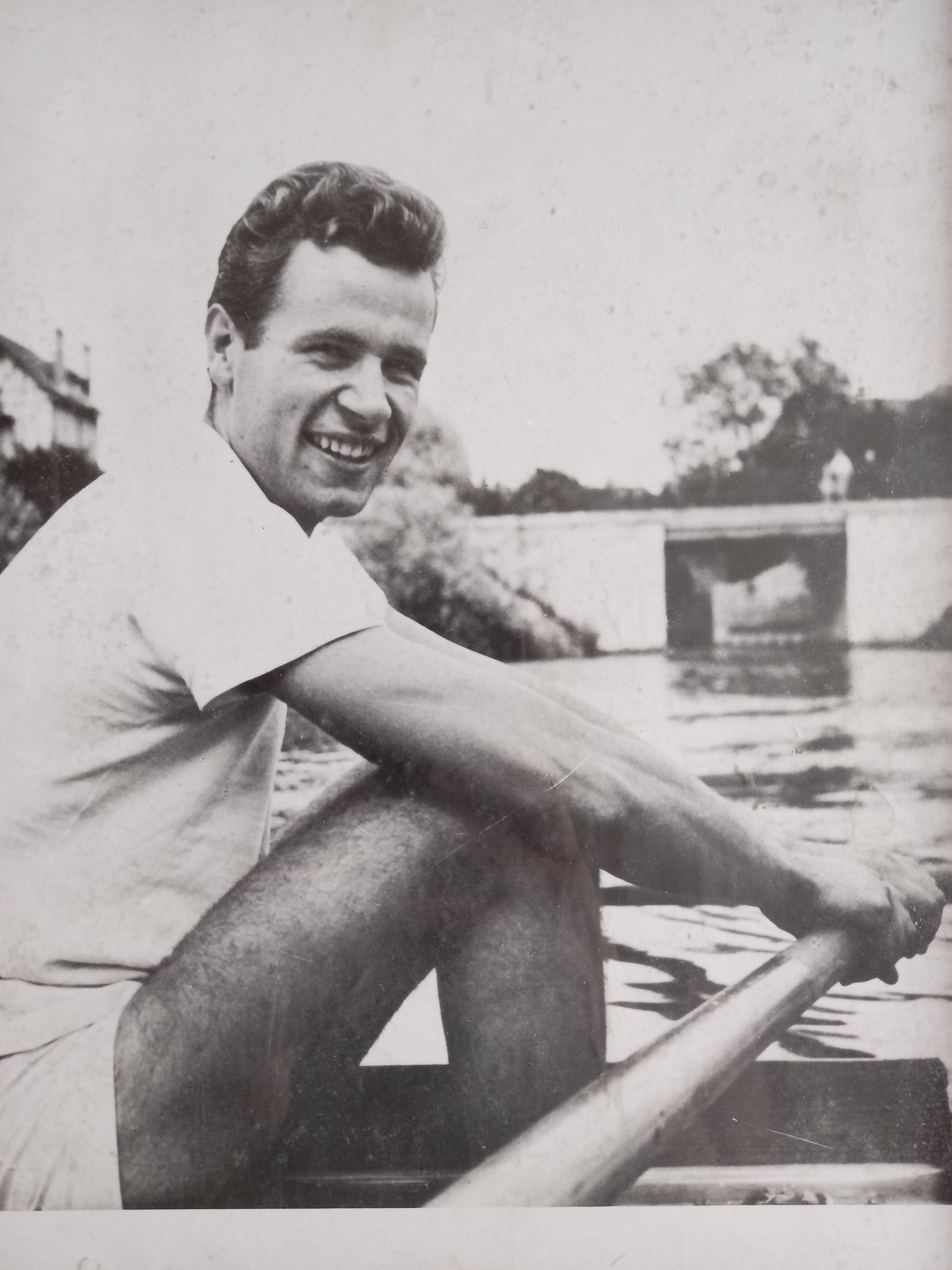

Personal information
- Born: 6 August 1941 Lyon, France
- Died: 15 June 2022 (aged 80)
- Height: 190 cm (6 ft 3 in)
- Weight: 82 kg (181 lb)

Sport
- Sport: Rowing
- Club: Cercle de l'Aviron de Lyon
Medal record
Men's rowing
Representing France
Olympic Games
Silver medal – second place	1960 Rome	Coxed four
World Championships
Bronze medal – third place	1962 Lucerne	Eight
European Rowing Championships
Bronze medal – third place	1961 Prague	Eight

Robert Dumontois (6 August 1941 – 15 June 2022) was a French former rower who competed in the 1960 Summer Olympics and in the 1964 Summer Olympics. He was born in Lyon in 1941 and rowed for Cercle de l'Aviron de Lyon.

At the 1960 Summer Olympics, he was a crew member of the French boat that won the silver medal in the coxed four event. At the 1961 European Rowing Championships, Dumontois won a bronze medal with the eight. At the inaugural World Rowing Championships in 1962, he won a bronze medal with the eight. At the 1964 Summer Olympics, he finished seventh with the French boat in the eight competition.
