= Toon de Ruiter =

Dutch rower

Personal information
- Nationality: Dutch
- Born: 12 June 1935; Ende, Dutch East Indies
- Died: 23 November 2001 (aged 66); Doetinchem, Netherlands

Sport
- Sport: Rowing

Toon de Ruiter (12 June 1935 – 23 November 2001) was a Dutch rower. He competed in the men's coxed four event at the 1960 Summer Olympics.
