= Oleg Aleksandrov =

Soviet rower (1937–1997)

Personal information
- Born: 13 July 1937 Yaroslavl, Russian SFSR, Soviet Union
- Died: 1997 (aged 59–60)
- Height: 185 cm (6 ft 1 in)
- Weight: 81 kg (179 lb)

Sport
- Sport: Rowing
Medal record
Men's rowing
Representing the Soviet Union
European Rowing Championships
Silver medal – second place	1961 Prague	Coxed four

Oleg Aleksandrov (Russian name: Олег Александров; 13 July 1937 – 1997) was a Soviet rower. He competed at the 1960 Summer Olympics in Rome with the men's coxed four where they came fourth. At the 1961 European Rowing Championships in Prague, the coxed four won a silver medal.
