= Rui Valença =

Portuguese rower (1932–2018)

Personal information
- Full name: Ruimondo Augusto Gavinha da Silva Valença
- Nationality: Portuguese
- Born: 28 September 1932 Caminha, Portugal
- Died: 2 November 2018 (aged 86) Porto, Portugal

Sport
- Sport: Rowing

Ruimondo Augusto Gavinha da Silva Valença (28 September 1932 – 2 November 2018) was a Portuguese rower. He competed in the men's coxed four event at the 1960 Summer Olympics. Valença died in Porto on 2 November 2018, at the age of 86.
