= Frank Moerman =

Dutch rower

Personal information
- Nationality: Dutch
- Born: 12 May 1937 Rotterdam, Netherlands
- Died: 27 January 2025 (aged 87)

Sport
- Sport: Rowing

Frank Moerman (12 May 1937 – 27 January 2025) was a Dutch rower. He competed in the men's coxed four event at the 1960 Summer Olympics.
