= Valentin Zanin =

Soviet rower

Personal information
- Born: 27 October 1937 (age 88) Leningrad, Russian SFSR, Soviet Union
- Height: 191 cm (6 ft 3 in)
- Weight: 89 kg (196 lb)

Sport
- Sport: Rowing
Medal record
Men's rowing
Representing the Soviet Union
European Rowing Championships
Silver medal – second place	1956 Bled	Coxed four

Valentin Petrovich Zanin (Russian name: Валентин Занин; born 27 October 1937) is a Soviet rower.

Zanin was born in 1937 in Leningrad. At the 1956 European Rowing Championships in Bled, he competed with the coxed four and they won silver. He went to the 1956 Summer Olympics in Melbourne and competed in the coxed four, where they were eliminated in the semi-final. He competed at the 1960 Summer Olympics in Rome with the coxed four where they came fourth.
