= Armando González (rowing) =

Spanish rower (1931–2022)

Personal information
- Nationality: Spanish
- Born: 8 August 1931; Vigo, Spain
- Died: 7 December 2022 (aged 91); Vigo, Spain

Sport
- Sport: Rowing

Armando González (8 August 1931 – 7 December 2022) was a Spanish coxswain. He competed in the men's coxed four event at the 1960 Summer Olympics.
