= Martin Bielz =

Romanian rower (1936–2023)

Personal information
- Nationality: Romanian
- Born: 12 August 1936; Sighișoara, Romania
- Died: 20 September 2023 (aged 87); Ottawa, Ontario, Canada

Sport
- Sport: Rowing

Martin Bielz (12 August 1936 – 20 September 2023) was a Romanian rower. He competed in the men's coxless four and men's coxed four events at the 1960 Summer Olympics.

He later became the technical director of The Canadian Association of Amateur Oarsmen. Bielz died on 20 September 2023, at the age of 87.
