= Guy Nosbaum =

French rower (1930–1996)

Personal information
- Born: 10 May 1930 Corbeil
- Died: 12 August 1996 (aged 66)

Sport
- Sport: Rowing
Medal record
Men's rowing
Representing France
Olympic Games
Silver medal – second place	1960 Rome	Coxed four
European Rowing Championships
Gold medal – first place	1953 Copenhagen	Coxed pair

Guy Nosbaum (10 May 1930 – 12 August 1996) was a French rower who competed in the 1952 Summer Olympics and in the 1960 Summer Olympics. He was Jewish, and was born in Corbeil. In 1952 he was a crew member of the French boat which was eliminated in the semi-finals of the coxed four event. Eight years later he won the silver medal with the French boat in the coxed fours competition.
