= Wolfdietrich Traugott =

Austrian rower

Personal information
- Nationality: Austrian
- Born: 12 May 1939 (age 85); Linz, Nazi Germany

Sport
- Sport: Rowing

Wolfdietrich Traugott (born 12 May 1939) is an Austrian rower. He competed in the men's coxed four event at the 1960 Summer Olympics.
