= Panagiotis Kalombratsos =

Greek rower (born 1934)

Personal information
- Nationality: Greek
- Born: 24 November 1934 (age 90); Thessaloniki, Greece

Sport
- Sport: Rowing

Panagiotis Kalombratsos (born 24 November 1934) is a Greek rower. He competed in the men's coxed four event at the 1960 Summer Olympics.
