= Igor Khokhlov =

Soviet rower

Personal information
- Born: 8 April 1937 (age 89) Leningrad, Soviet Union
- Height: 187 cm (6 ft 2 in)
- Weight: 83 kg (183 lb)

Sport
- Sport: Rowing
Medal record
Men's rowing
Representing the Soviet Union
European Rowing Championships
Bronze medal – third place	1959 Mâcon	Eight

Igor Nikolayevich Khokhlov (Russian name: Игорь Хохлов; born 8 April 1937) is a Soviet rower. He competed at the 1960 Summer Olympics in Rome with the men's coxed four where they came fourth. He later worked as a rowing coach.
