= Fulvio Balatti =

Italian rower (1938–2001)

Personal information
- Born: 3 January 1938 Mandello del Lario, Italy
- Died: 27 October 2001 (aged 63)
- Height: 185 cm (6 ft 1 in)
- Weight: 88 kg (194 lb)

Sport
- Sport: Rowing
- Club: GS Moto Guzzi
Medal record
Men's rowing
Bronze medal – third place	1960 Rome	Coxed four
European Rowing Championships
Gold medal – first place	1958 Poznań	Eight
Gold medal – first place	1961 Prague	Eight
Silver medal – second place	1963 Copenhagen	Coxless four
Bronze medal – third place	1964 Amsterdam	Coxless four

Fulvio Balatti (3 January 1938 – 27 October 2001) was an Italian rower who competed in the 1960 Summer Olympics and in the 1964 Summer Olympics. He was born in Mandello del Lario in 1938 and rowed for GS Moto Guzzi.

At the 1958 European Rowing Championships, Balatti rowed for the eight and won gold. At the 1960 Summer Olympics, he was a crew member of the Italian boat that won the bronze medal in the coxed four event. At the 1961 European Rowing Championships, Balatti was back in the eight and won gold. At the 1963 European Rowing Championships, he was part of the coxless four that won silver. At the 1964 European Rowing Championships, his coxless four won bronze. At the 1964 Summer Olympics, he was part of the Italian boat that finished fifth in the coxless four event. Balatti died on 27 October 2001.
