= Jean Klein (rower) =

French rower

Medal record

Men's rowing

Olympic Games
| Silver medal – second place | 1960 Rome | Coxed four |

Jean-Claude Klein (22 June 1944 – 1 December 2014) was a French rower who competed in the 1960 Summer Olympics. There, he won a silver medal in the four-oared shell with coxswain. He was Jewish, and was born in Créteil. In 1960 he was the coxswain of the French boat which won the silver medal in the coxed fours event.
