= Chuck Alm =

American rower (1937–2025)

Olympic medal record

Men's Rowing

Representing the United States

Charles Pfeiffer Alm (March 27, 1937 – January 16, 2025) was an American rower who competed at the 1960 Summer Olympics in Rome, Italy. He was born in Seattle, Washington. In 1960 he was a crew member of the American boat in the coxed fours events.
