= Niels Petersen (sport shooter) =

Danish former sport shooter (born 1932)

Personal information
- Born: 8 September 1932 (age 93) Aarhus, Denmark

Sport
- Sport: Sports shooting

Niels Petersen (born 8 September 1932) is a Danish former sport shooter who competed in the 1960 Summer Olympics and in the 1964 Summer Olympics.
