= Ejgo Vejby Nielsen =

Danish rower

Personal information
- Nationality: Danish
- Born: 29 April 1940 (age 84); Lolland, Denmark

Sport
- Sport: Rowing

Ejgo Vejby Nielsen (born 29 April 1940) is a Danish rower. He competed in the men's coxed four event at the 1960 Summer Olympics.
