= Matti Maisala =

Finnish rower

Personal information
- Nationality: Finnish
- Born: 14 November 1931 (age 94) Koivisto, Finland

Sport
- Sport: Rowing

Matti Maisala (born 14 November 1931) is a Finnish rower. He competed in the men's coxed four event at the 1960 Summer Olympics. His brother Mauno was also a rower.
