= Dieter Ebner =

Austrian rower

Personal information
- Nationality: Austrian
- Born: 26 June 1940 (age 86) Linz, Nazi Germany

Sport
- Sport: Rowing
Medal record
Men's rowing
Representing Austria
World Rowing Championships
Bronze medal – third place	1962 Lucerne	Coxless four

Dieter Ebner (born 26 June 1940) is an Austrian rower. He competed at the 1960 Summer Olympics, 1964 Summer Olympics and the 1968 Summer Olympics. He won a bronze medal at the inaugural 1962 World Rowing Championships in the coxless four event.
