= Roy Rubin (rower) =

American rower (born 1941)

Personal information
- Full name: Roy John Rubin
- Nationality: American
- Born: January 24, 1941 (age 85) Bellingham, Washington, United States

Sport
- Sport: Rowing

Roy John Rubin (born January 24, 1941) is an American rower. He competed in the men's coxed four event at the 1960 Summer Olympics.
