= Janez Pintar =

Slovenian rower

Personal information
- Nationality: Croatian
- Born: 11 March 1931; Ljubljana, Yugoslavia
- Died: 22 April 2006 (aged 75); Ljubljana, Slovenia

Sport
- Sport: Rowing

Janez Pintar (11 March 1931 – 22 April 2006) was a Slovenian rower who represented Yugoslavia. He competed in the men's coxed four event at the 1960 Summer Olympics.
