= Poul Justesen =

Danish rower

Personal information
- Nationality: Danish
- Born: 26 May 1933 (age 91); Lolland, Denmark

Sport
- Sport: Rowing

Poul Justesen (born 26 May 1933) is a Danish rower. He competed in the men's coxed four event at the 1960 Summer Olympics.
