= Erik Rask =

Danish rower

Personal information
- Nationality: Danish
- Born: 3 April 1936 (age 88); Lolland, Denmark

Sport
- Sport: Rowing

Erik Rask (born 3 April 1936) is a Danish rower. He competed in the men's coxed four event at the 1960 Summer Olympics.
