= Ionel Petrov =

Romanian rower

Personal information
- Born: 7 October 1934 (age 91) Sulina, Romania
- Height: 184 cm (6 ft 0 in)
- Weight: 100 kg (220 lb)

Sport
- Sport: Rowing
Medal record
Men's rowing
Representing Romania
World Championships
Silver medal – second place	1962 Lucerne	Coxed pair
European Championships
Silver medal – second place	1961 Prague	Coxed pair
Bronze medal – third place	1963 Copenhagen	Coxed pair

Ionel Petrov (born 7 October 1934) is a Romanian rower. He competed at the 1960 Summer Olympics in Rome with the men's coxless four where they were eliminated in the round one repêchage.
