= Vladimir Nekora =

Croatian rower

Personal information
- Nationality: Croatian
- Born: 10 August 1938; Gornja Toplica, Yugoslavia
- Died: 24 January 2004 (aged 65); Pula, Croatia

Sport
- Sport: Rowing

Vladimir Nekora (10 August 1938 – 24 January 2004) was a Croatian rower. He competed in the men's coxed four event at the 1960 Summer Olympics.
