= Svend Helge Hansen =

Danish rower (1930–2025)

Personal information
- Nationality: Danish
- Born: 13 September 1930 Lolland, Denmark
- Died: 29 April 2004 (aged 73)

Sport
- Sport: Rowing

Svend Helge Hansen (13 September 1930 – 29 April 2004) was a Danish rower. He competed in the men's coxed four event at the 1960 Summer Olympics. Hansen died on 29 April 2004, at the age of 73.
