= Adolf Potočar =

Slovenian rower (1932–2022)

Adolf Potokar
Personal information
- Nationality: Slovenian
- Born: 18 August 1932 Ljubljana, Yugoslavia
- Died: December 2022 (aged 90)

Sport
- Sport: Rowing

Adolf Potokar (18 August 1932 – December 2022) was a Slovenian rower. He competed in the men's coxed four event at the 1960 Summer Olympics. Potokar died in December 2022, at the age of 90.
