= Henk Wamsteker (rower) =

Dutch rower

Personal information
- Nationality: Dutch
- Born: 6 August 1936 (age 88); Oegstgeest, Netherlands

Sport
- Sport: Rowing

Henk Wamsteker (born 6 August 1936) is a Dutch rower. He competed in the men's coxed four event at the 1960 Summer Olympics.
