= Lars-Eric Gustafsson =

Swedish rower

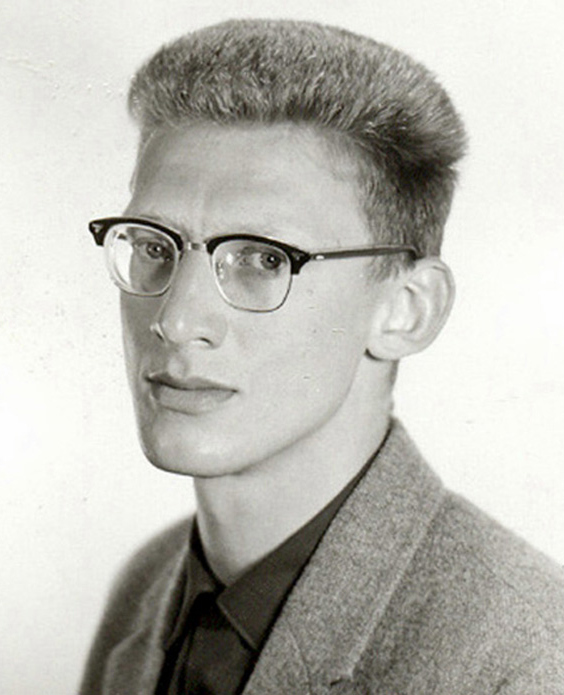

Personal information
- Born: 6 June 1935 (age 91) Gothenburg, Sweden

Sport
- Sport: Rowing
- Club: Uddevalla Roddklubb
Medal record
Representing Sweden
European Rowing Championships
Bronze medal – third place	1959 Mâcon	Coxed four

Lars-Eric Gustafsson (also Gustavsson; born 6 June 1935) is a retired Swedish rower who won a bronze medal in the coxed fours at the 1959 European Championships. He competed in the coxed fours and in the eights at the 1960 Summer Olympics, but failed to reach the finals.
