= Kjell Hansson =

Swedish rower (1931–2019)

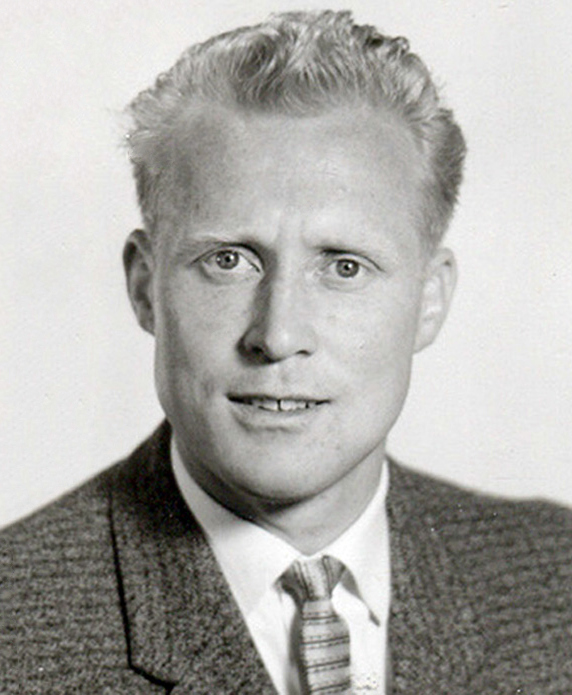

Personal information
- Born: 16 July 1931 Halden, Norway
- Died: 22 June 2019 (aged 87)

Sport
- Sport: Rowing
- Club: Roddklubben Three Towns; Uddevalla Roddklubb
Medal record
Representing Sweden
European Rowing Championships
| Bronze medal – third place | 1959 Mâcon | Coxed four |

Kjell Hansson (16 July 1931 – 22 June 2019) was a Swedish rower. He won a bronze medal in the coxed fours at the 1959 European Championships.

== Career ==
He competed in the eights at the 1956 and 1960 Olympics and finished in fourth place in 1956.
