= Hiroshi Ishii (swimmer) =

Japanese swimmer

Personal information
- Born: September 21, 1939 (age 86)

Sport
- Sport: Swimming
Medal record
Representing Japan
Olympic Games
Silver medal – second place	1960 Rome	4x200m freestyle relay
Asian Games
Silver medal – second place	1958 Tokyo	1500m freestyle

Hiroshi Ishii (石井 宏, Ishii Hiroshi) (born 21 September 1939) is a Japanese swimmer and Olympic medalist. He participated at the 1960 Summer Olympics, winning a silver medal in 4 x 200 metre freestyle relay.
