= Paulino Leite =

Brazilian rower

Personal information
- Nationality: Brazilian
- Born: 1 April 1937 (age 87); Portugal

Sport
- Sport: Rowing

Paulino Leite (born 1 April 1937) is a Brazilian rower. He competed in the men's coxed four event at the 1960 Summer Olympics.
