= Väinö Huhtala (rower) =

Finnish rower

Personal information
- Nationality: Finnish
- Born: 23 June 1934; Sievi, Finland
- Died: 25 February 1997 (aged 62)

Sport
- Sport: Rowing

Väinö Huhtala (23 June 1934 – 25 February 1997) was a Finnish rower. He competed in the men's coxed four event at the 1960 Summer Olympics.
