= Mogens Pedersen (rower, born 1937) =

Danish rower

Personal information
- Nationality: Danish
- Born: 15 December 1937 (age 87); Lolland, Denmark

Sport
- Sport: Rowing

Mogens Pedersen (born 15 December 1937) is a Danish rower. He competed in the men's coxed four event at the 1960 Summer Olympics.
