= Eduardo Endtner =

Brazilian rower

Personal information
- Born: 11 June 1942; Rio Grande do Sul, Brazil
- Died: 5 August 1995 (aged 53)

Sport
- Sport: Rowing

Eduardo Endtner (11 June 1942 – 5 August 1995) was a Brazilian rower. He competed in the men's coxed four event at the 1960 Summer Olympics.
