= Francisco Todesco =

Brazilian rower

Personal information
- Nationality: Brazilian
- Born: 31 October 1937 (age 87); Vicenza, Italy

Sport
- Sport: Rowing

Francisco Todesco (born 31 October 1937) is a Brazilian rower. He competed in the men's coxed four event at the 1960 Summer Olympics.
