= Mircea Roger =

Romanian rower

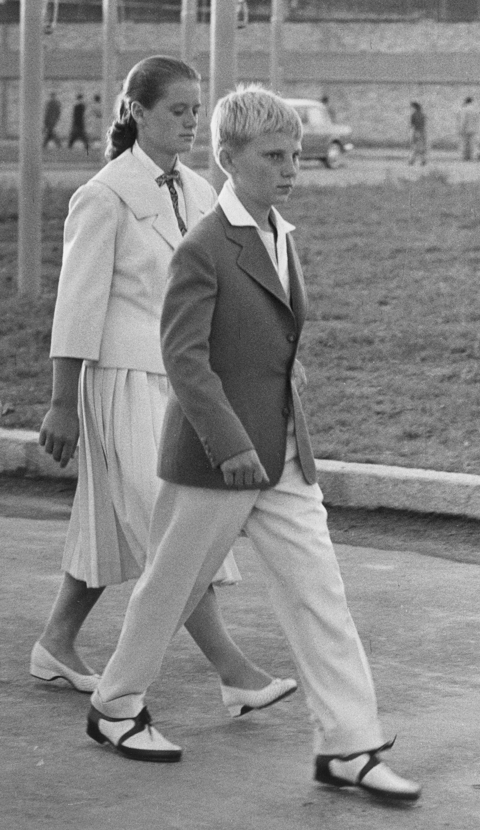
- Roger (right) at the 1960 Olympics

Personal information
- Born: 16 June 1947 (age 79) Cimpulung Moldovenesc, Suceava, Romania
- Height: 1.46 m (4 ft 9 in)
- Weight: 40 kg (88 lb)

Sport
- Sport: Rowing

Mircea Roger (born 16 June 1947) is a retired Romanian rowing coxswain. He was the youngest Romanian participant at the 1960 Summer Olympics, where he competed in the coxed pairs and coxed fours and placed sixth in the pairs.
