= Pál Wágner =

Hungarian rower

Personal information
- Nationality: Hungarian
- Born: 1 November 1935 (age 89); Budapest, Hungary

Sport
- Sport: Rowing

Pál Wágner (born 1 November 1935) is a Hungarian rower. He competed in two events at the 1960 Summer Olympics.
