= Kirsten Michaelsen =

Danish swimmer

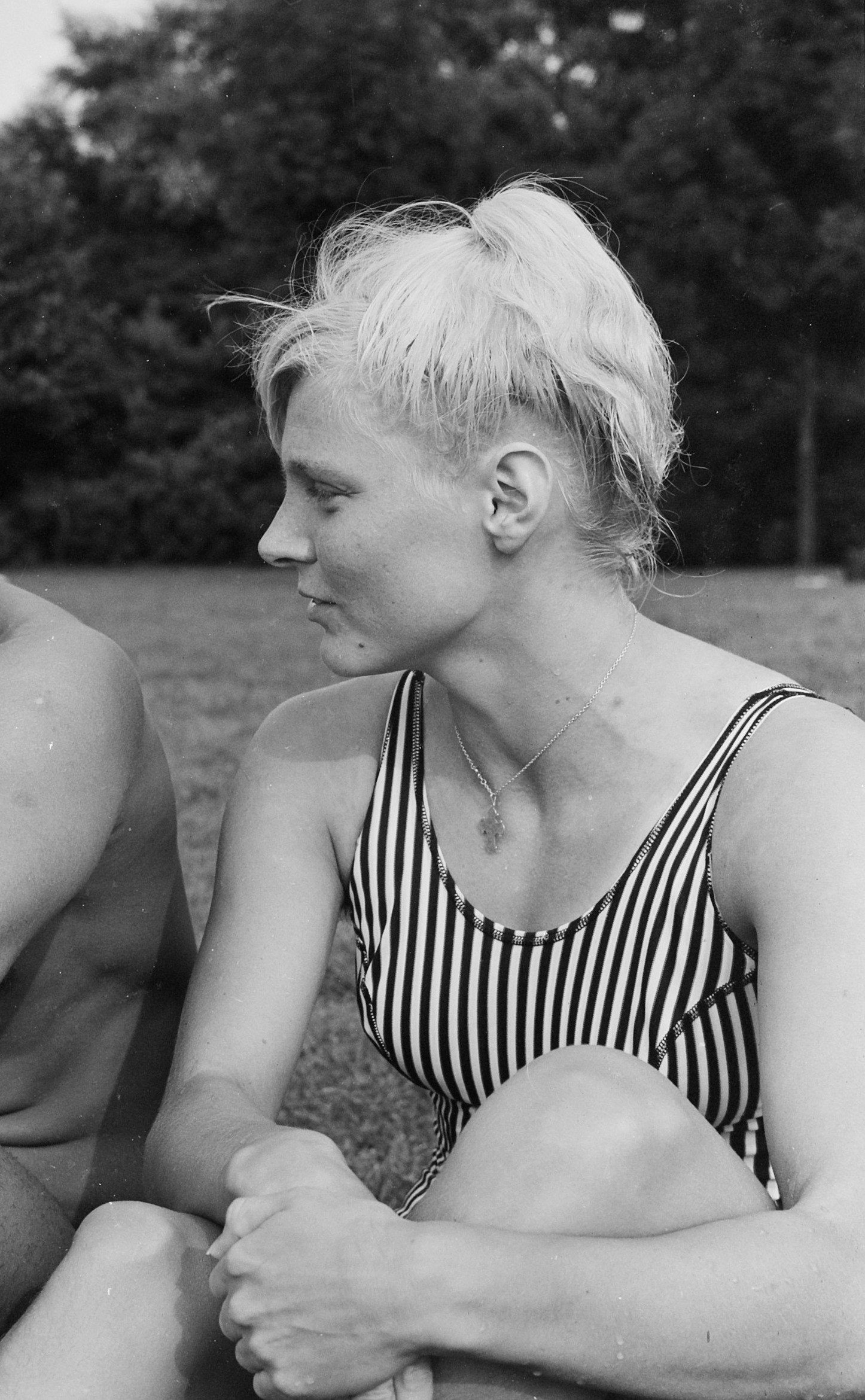
- Kirsten Michaelsen in 1964

Personal information
- Born: 16 June 1943 (age 83) Copenhagen, Denmark
- Height: 1.66 m (5 ft 5 in)
- Weight: 58 kg (128 lb)

Sport
- Sport: Swimming
- Club: Svømmeklubben Triton, Ballerup

Kirsten Michaelsen (born 16 June 1943) is a Danish retired swimmer. She competed at the 1960 and 1964 Summer Olympics in the 100-meter backstroke event, but failed to reach the finals.

She is acclaimed in the Danish Swimming Hall of Fame for setting 20 individual Danish records and more than 8 Nordic records. At the 1964 Summer Olympics, she set the Nordic record in the 100-meter backstroke with a time of 1:09.9, lasting 12 years undefeated.
