= Fernando de Abreu =

Brazilian swimmer (born 1944)

Personal information
- Full name: Fernando Nabuco de Abreu
- Born: 22 June 1944 (age 82) São Paulo, São Paulo, Brazil
- Height: 1.83 m (6 ft 0 in)

Sport
- Sport: Swimming
- Strokes: Freestyle
Medal record
Men's swimming
Representing Brazil

Fernando Nabuco de Abreu (born 22 June 1944 in São Paulo) is a former Olympic freestyle swimmer from Brazil, who participated at one Summer Olympics for his native country.

He was president of the Brazilian Cycling Confederation and CEO of São Paulo Stock Exchange.

He was the son of an Olympic athlete, the rower Fernando Nabuco de Abreu, and started swimming at the age of six, at Club Athletico Paulistano, where he always competed.

At 16 years of age, at the 1960 Summer Olympics in Rome, he swam the 100-metre freestyle and the 4×100-metre medley, not reaching the finals.

He was Brazilian and South American champion and ended his swimming career at the age of 17. He was also a water polo player and sailor.
