= Ulf Gustafsson =

Swedish rower

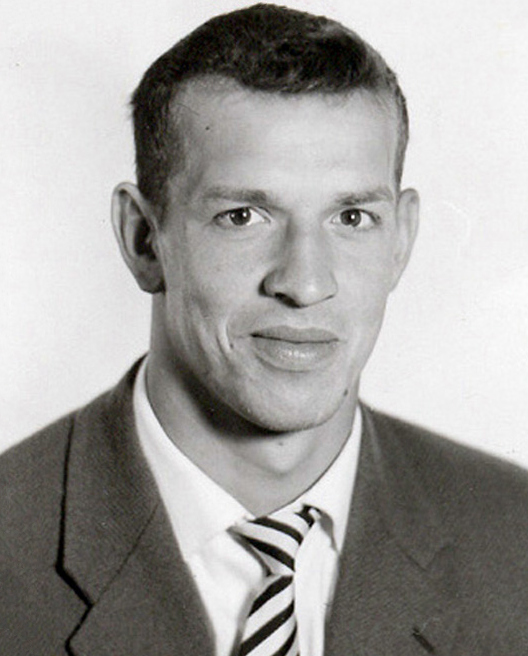

Personal information
- Born: 13 December 1937 (age 88) Skållerud, Mellerud, Sweden

Sport
- Sport: Rowing
- Club: Uddevalla Roddklubb
Medal record
Representing Sweden
European Rowing Championships
| Bronze medal – third place | 1959 Mâcon | Coxed four |

Ulf Lindor Gustafsson (also Gustavsson; born 13 December 1937) is a retired Swedish rower who won a bronze medal in the coxed fours at the 1959 European Championships. He competed in the coxed fours and the eights at the 1960 Summer Olympics, but failed to reach the finals.
