= László Munteán =

Hungarian rower

Personal information
- Nationality: Hungarian
- Born: 30 November 1935; Budapest, Hungary
- Died: 3 May 1983 (aged 47); Budapest, Hungary

Sport
- Sport: Rowing

László Munteán (30 November 1935 – 3 May 1983) was a Hungarian rower. He competed in two events at the 1960 Summer Olympics.
