= Raimo Honkanen =

Finnish cyclist (1938–2020)

Personal information
- Born: 10 August 1938 Turku, Finland
- Died: 17 June 2020 (aged 81) Turku, Finland

Cycling career
- Sport: Cycling

Raimo Honkanen (10 August 1938 – 17 June 2020) was a Finnish cyclist. He was born in Turku and his profession was a postal worker. He competed at the 1960 Summer Olympics and the 1968 Summer Olympics.
