= Matti Herronen =

Finnish cyclist

Personal information
- Born: 19 January 1933 (age 93) Kälviä, Finland

Cycling career
- Sport: Cycling

Matti Herronen (born 19 January 1933) is a Finnish former cyclist. He competed in the individual road race and team time trial events at the 1960 Summer Olympics.
