= Waldemar Scovino =

Brazilian rower

Personal information
- Born: 6 December 1931; Rio de Janeiro, Brazil
- Died: 20 November 1963 (aged 31)

Sport
- Sport: Rowing

Waldemar Scovino (6 December 1931 – 20 November 1963) was a Brazilian rower. He competed in the men's coxed four event at the 1960 Summer Olympics.
