= Dieter Losert =

Austrian rower

Personal information
- Nationality: Austrian
- Born: 1 November 1940 (age 85) Linz, Nazi Germany

Sport
- Sport: Rowing
Medal record
Men's rowing
Representing Austria
World Rowing Championships
Bronze medal – third place	1962 Lucerne	Coxless four

Dieter Losert (born 1 November 1940) is an Austrian rower. He competed at the 1960 Summer Olympics, 1964 Summer Olympics and the 1968 Summer Olympics. He won a bronze medal at the inaugural 1962 World Rowing Championships in the coxless four event.
