= Nikola Stipanicev =

Croatian rower

Personal information
- Nationality: Croatian
- Born: 9 December 1936; Tribulj, Yugoslavia
- Died: 20 April 2022 (aged 85)

Sport
- Sport: Rowing

Nikola Stipanicev (9 December 1936 – 20 April 2022) was a Croatian rower. He competed in the men's coxed four event at the 1960 Summer Olympics.
