= Veljko Rogošić =

Croatian long-distance swimmer

Personal information
- Born: July 21, 1941
- Died: August 7, 2012 (aged 71)

Sport
- Sport: Swimming
Medal record
Representing Yugoslavia
Mediterranean Games
Silver medal – second place	1963 Naples	400 m freestyle
Bronze medal – third place	1963 Naples	1500 m freestyle

Veljko Rogošić (21 July 1941 – 7 August 2012) was a Croatian long-distance swimmer who competed at the Olympics for SFR Yugoslavia and won numerous awards from the start of his swimming career in 1959. Rogošić also holds the world record for longest distance ever swum in open ocean without flippers. He swam a total of 225 km (139.8 miles) across the Adriatic Sea in a time of 50 hours and 10 minutes from Grado to Riccione in Italy on 29–31 August 2006, setting the Guinness World Record.

== See also ==
- List of members of the International Swimming Hall of Fame
