= Stig-Olof Grenner =

Finnish swimmer

Personal information
- Born: 6 May 1939 Helsinki, Finland
- Died: 14 March 2008 (aged 68) Helsinki, Finland

Sport
- Sport: Swimming

Stig-Olof Grenner (6 May 1939 – 14 March 2008) was a Finnish swimmer. He competed in three events at the 1960 Summer Olympics.
