= Michael Obst (rower) =

German rower

Personal information
- Born: 22 June 1944 (age 82) Leipzig, Germany

Sport
- Sport: Rowing
- Club: RC Germania Düsseldorf
Medal record
Men's rowing
Olympic Games
Representing Germany
Gold medal – first place	1960 Rome	Coxed four
European Championships
Representing West Germany
Gold medal – first place	1959 Mâcon	Coxed four

Michael Obst (born 22 June 1944) is a German rower who competed for the United Team of Germany in the 1960 Summer Olympics.

He was born in Leipzig. At the 1959 European Rowing Championships in Mâcon, he won gold with the coxed four. In 1960 he was the coxswain of the German boat which won the gold medal in the coxed four event.
