= Slobodan Kićović =

Yugoslav swimmer (1941–2020)

Personal information
- Born: 19 July 1941 Cetinje, Yugoslavia
- Died: 16 March 2020 (aged 78)

Sport
- Sport: Swimming

Slobodan Kićović (19 July 1941 – 16 March 2020) was a Yugoslav swimmer. He competed in two events at the 1960 Summer Olympics.
