= Ilkka Suvanto =

Finnish swimmer (born 1943)

Personal information
- Born: 13 August 1943 (age 82) Helsinki, Finland

Sport
- Sport: Swimming

Ilkka Suvanto (born 13 August 1943) is a Finnish former butterfly, freestyle and medley swimmer. He competed at the 1960 Summer Olympics and the 1964 Summer Olympics. Suvanto became a U.S. citizen in 1968.
