= Kari Haavisto =

Finnish swimmer

Personal information
- Born: 26 April 1941 (age 85) Helsinki, Finland

Sport
- Sport: Swimming

Kari Haavisto (born 26 April 1941) is a Finnish former freestyle swimmer. He competed in two events at the 1960 Summer Olympics.
