= Harri Klein =

Brazilian rower

Personal information
- Born: 1 January 1942; Porto Alegre, Brazil
- Died: 29 December 2019 (aged 77)

Sport
- Sport: Rowing

Harri Klein (1 January 1942 – 29 December 2019) was a Brazilian rower. He competed at the 1960 Summer Olympics and the 1968 Summer Olympics.
