= Reijo Sundén =

Finnish rower

Personal information
- Nationality: Finnish
- Born: 27 September 1941 (age 83); Turku, Finland

Sport
- Sport: Rowing

Reijo Sundén (born 27 September 1941) is a Finnish rower. He competed in the men's coxed four event at the 1960 Summer Olympics.
