= Karri Käyhkö =

Finnish swimmer (1937–2020)

Personal information
- Born: 16 December 1937 Espoo, Finland
- Died: 7 March 2020 (aged 82)

Sport
- Sport: Swimming

Karri Käyhkö (16 December 1937 – 7 March 2020) was a Finnish freestyle swimmer. He competed at the 1956 Summer Olympics and the 1960 Summer Olympics.
