= Horst Effertz =

German rower (born 1938)

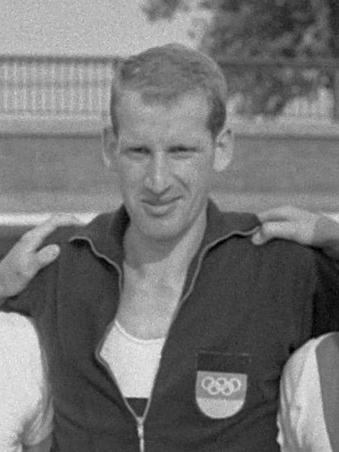
- Horst Effertz in 1964

Personal information
- Born: 4 August 1938 (age 87) Düsseldorf, Germany
- Height: 1.94 m (6 ft 4 in)
- Weight: 90 kg (200 lb)

Sport
- Sport: Rowing
- Club: RC Germania Düsseldorf
Medal record
Representing Germany
Olympic Games
Gold medal – first place	1960 Rome	Coxed four
Representing West Germany
European Rowing Championships
Silver medal – second place	1958 Poznań	Coxless pair
Gold medal – first place	1959 Mâcon	Coxed four
Gold medal – first place	1964 Amsterdam	Coxless four

Horst Effertz (born 4 August 1938) is a retired German rower who won a gold medal in the coxed fours at the 1960 Summer Olympics. Four years later he competed in the coxless fours and finished in sixth place. Effertz won two European titles in 1959 and 1964 and finished second in 1958.
