= Soviet Union at the 1960 Summer Olympics =

- Flag of the Soviet Union
- IOC code: URS
- NOC: Soviet Olympic Committee

in Rome, Italy 25 August 1960 – 11 September 1960
- Competitors: 283 (233 men, 50 women) in 17 sports
- Flag bearer: Yury Vlasov
- Medals Ranked 1st: Gold 43 Silver 29 Bronze 31 Total 103

Summer Olympics appearances (overview)
- 1952; 1956; 1960; 1964; 1968; 1972; 1976; 1980; 1984; 1988

Other related appearances
- Russian Empire (1900–1912); Estonia (1920–1936, 1992–pres.); Latvia (1924–1936, 1992–pres.); Lithuania (1924–1928, 1992–pres.); Unified Team (1992); Armenia (1994–pres.); Belarus (1994–2020); Georgia (1994–pres.); Kazakhstan (1994–pres.); Kyrgyzstan (1994–pres.); Moldova (1994–pres.); Russia (1994–2016); Ukraine (1994–pres.); Uzbekistan (1994–pres.); Azerbaijan (1996–pres.); Tajikistan (1996–pres.); Turkmenistan (1996–pres.); ROC (2020); Individual Neutral Athletes (2024)

The Soviet Union (USSR) competed at the 1960 Summer Olympics in Rome, Italy. 283 competitors, 233 men and 50 women, took part in 145 events in 17 sports.

== Medalists ==
The USSR finished first in the final medal rankings, with 43 gold and 103 total medals.

=== Gold ===
- Larisa Latynina — Artistic gymnastics, women's floor exercise
- Boris Shakhlin — Artistic gymnastics, men's individual all-round
- Larisa Latynina — Artistic gymnastics, women's individual all-round
- Boris Shakhlin — Artistic gymnastics, men's parallel bars
- Boris Shakhlin — Artistic gymnastics, men's pommel horse
- Albert Azaryan — Artistic gymnastics, men's rings
- Sofia Muratova, Larisa Latynina, Polina Astakhova, Tamara Lyukhina-Zamotailova, Lidiya Kalinina-Ivanova, Margarita Nikolaeva — Artistic gymnastics, women's team competition
- Polina Astakhova — Artistic gymnastics, women's uneven bars
- Boris Shakhlin — Artistic gymnastics, men's vault
- Margarita Nikolaeva — Artistic gymnastics, women's vault
- Pyotr Bolotnikov — Athletics, men's 10000 m
- Vladimir Golubnichy — Athletics, men's 20 km walk
- Lyudmila Lisenko-Shevtsova — Athletics, women's 800 m
- Irina Press — Athletics, women's 80 m hurdles
- Nina Romashkova — Athletics, women's discus throw
- Vasili Rudenkov — Athletics, men's hammer throw
- Robert Shavlakadze — Athletics, men's high jump
- Viktor Tsybulenko — Athletics, men's javelin throw
- Elvīra Ozoliņa — Athletics, women's javelin throw
- Vera Krepkina — Athletics, women's long jump
- Tamara Press — Athletics, women's shot put
- Oleg Grigoryev — Boxing, men's bantamweight
- Leonid Geishtor, Sergei Makarenko — Canoeing, men's C-2 1000 m
- Antonina Seredina — Canoeing, women's K-1 500 m
- Mariya Shubina, Antonina Seredina — Canoeing, women's K-2 500 m
- Viktor Kapitonov — Cycling road, men's individual road race
- Sergei Filatov and his horse Absent — Equestrian, individual mixed
- Viktor Zhdanovich — Fencing, men's foil individual
- Viktor Zhdanovich, Mark Midler, Yuri Rudov, Yuri Sisikin, German Sveshnikov — Fencing, men's foil team
- Valentina Prudskova, Aleksandra Zabelina, Lyudmila Shishova, Tatyana Petrenko-Samusenko, Galina Gorokhova, Valentina Rastvorova — Fencing, women's foil team
- Valentin Boreiko, Oleg Golovanov — Rowing, men's coxless pair
- Vyacheslav Ivanov — Rowing, men's single sculls
- Timir Pinegin, Fyodor Shutkov — Sailing, Star class
- Aleksey Gushchin — Shooting, men's 50 m pistol
- Viktor Shamburkin — Shooting, men's rifle 3 positions
- Yury Vlasov — Weightlifting, men's heavyweight
- Yevgeni Minaev — Weightlifting, men's featherweight
- Viktor Georgiyevitch Bushuyev — Weightlifting, men's lightweight
- Aleksandr Kurynov — Weightlifting, men's middleweight
- Arkady Vorobyov — Weightlifting, men's middle-heavyweight
- Ivan Bogdan — Wrestling, men's Greco-Roman superheavyweight
- Oleg Karavaev — Wrestling, men's Greco-Roman bantamweight
- Avtandil Koridze — Wrestling, men's Greco-Roman lightweight

=== Silver ===
- Larisa Latynina — Artistic gymnastics, women's balance beam
- Yuri Titov — Artistic gymnastics, men's floor exercise
- Polina Astakhova — Artistic gymnastics, women's floor exercise
- Sofia Muratova — Artistic gymnastics, women's individual all-round
- Boris Shakhlin — Artistic gymnastics, men's rings
- Boris Shakhlin, Yuri Titov, Albert Azaryan, Vladimir Portnoi, Valeri Kerdemilidi, Nikolai Miligulo — Artistic gymnastics, men's team competition
- Larisa Latynina — Artistic gymnastics, women's uneven bars
- Sofia Muratova — Artistic gymnastics, women's vault
- Nikolay Sokolov — Athletics, men's 3000 m steeplechase
- Gusman Kosanov, Leonid Bartenev, Yuriy Konovalov, Edvin Ozolin — Athletics, men's 4 × 100 m relay
- Tamara Press — Athletics, women's discus throw
- Valery Brumel — Athletics, men's high jump
- Vladimir Goryaev — Athletics, men's triple jump
- Yuri Korneev, Yanis Krumins, Guram Minashvili, Valdis Muizhniek, Tsezar Ozer, Aleksandr Petrov, Mikhail Semyonov, Vladimir Ugrekhelidze, Maigonis Valdmanis, Albert Valtin, Gennadi Volnov, Viktor Zubkov — Basketball, men's team competition
- Sergei Sivko — Boxing, men's flyweight
- Yuri Radonyak — Boxing, men's welterweight
- Aleksandr Silaev — Canoeing, men's C-1 1000 m
- Yuri Sisikin — Fencing, men's foil individual
- Valentina Rastvorova — Fencing, women's foil individual
- Nikolai Tatarinov, Hanno Selg, Igor Novikov — Modern pentathlon, men's team competition
- Aleksandr Berkutov, Yuriy Tyukalov — Rowing, men's double sculls
- Antanas Bogdanavichus, Zigmas Yukna, Igor Rudakov — Rowing, men's pair-oared shell with coxswain
- Aleksandr Chuchelov — Sailing, men's Finn class
- Makhmud Umarov — Shooting, men's 50 m pistol
- Marat Niyazov — Shooting, men's 50 m rifle 3 positions
- Vladimir Semyonov, Anatoly Kartashov, Vladimir Novikov, Petre Mshvenieradze, Yuri Grigorovsky, Viktor Ageev, Givi Chikvanaya, Leri Gogoladze, Vyacheslav Kurennoi, Boris Goikhmann and Yevgeni Saltsyn — Water polo, men's team competition
- Trofim Lomakin — Weightlifting, men's middle-heavyweight
- Vladimir Sinyavsky — Wrestling, men's freestyle lightweight
- Georgi Skhirtladze — Wrestling, men's freestyle middleweight

=== Bronze ===
- Sofia Muratova — Artistic gymnastics, women's balance beam
- Tamara Lyukhina-Zamotailova — Artistic gymnastics, women's floor exercise
- Boris Shakhlin — Artistic gymnastics, men's horizontal bar
- Yuri Titov — Artistic gymnastics, men's individual all-round
- Polina Astakhova — Artistic gymnastics, women's individual all-round
- Tamara Lyukhina-Zamotailova — Artistic gymnastics, women's uneven bars
- Vladimir Portnoi — Artistic gymnastics, men's vault
- Larisa Latynina — Artistic gymnastics, women's vault
- Semen Rzhischin — Athletics, men's 3000 m steeplechase
- Vasili Kuznetsov — Athletics, men's decathlon
- Birutė Kalėdienė — Athletics, women's javelin throw
- Igor Ter-Ovanesyan — Athletics, men's long jump
- Vitold Kreer — Athletics, men's triple jump
- Boris Lagutin — Boxing, men's light-middleweight
- Yevgeni Feofanov — Boxing, men's 71–75 kg
- Viktor Kapitonov, Yevgeni Klevtsov, Yuri Melikhov, Aleksei Petrov — Cycling road, men's team time trial
- Rostislav Vargashkin — Cycling track, men's 1 km time trial
- Boris Vasilyev, Vladimir Leonov — Cycling track, men's 2000 m tandem
- Stanislav Moskvin, Viktor Romanov, Leonid Kolumbet, Arnold Belgardt — Cycling track, men's team pursuit
- Ninel Krutova — Diving, women's 10 m platform
- Bruno Khabarov — Fencing, men's épée individual
- Valentin Chernikov, Guram Kostava, Arnold Chernushevich, Bruno Khabarov, Aleksandr Pavlovsky — Fencing, men's épée team
- Igor Akhremchik, Yuriy Bachurov, Valentin Morkovkin, Anatoli Tarabrin — Rowing, men's four without coxswain
- Aleksandr Zabelin — Shooting, men's 25 m rapid fire pistol
- Vasily Borisov — Shooting, men's 300 m free rifle 3 positions
- Sergei Kalinin — Shooting, men's trap
- Savkus Dzarasov — Wrestling, men's freestyle heavyweight
- Vladimir Rubashvili — Wrestling, men's freestyle featherweight
- Anatoli Albul — Wrestling, men's freestyle light-heavyweight
- Konstantin Vyrupaev — Wrestling, men's Greco-Roman featherweight
- Givi Kartoziya — Wrestling, men's Greco-Roman light-heavyweight

Medals by sport
Sport	1st place, gold medalist(s)	2nd place, silver medalist(s)	3rd place, bronze medalist(s)	Total
Athletics	11	5	5	21
Gymnastics	10	8	8	26
Weightlifting	5	1	0	6
Wrestling	3	2	5	10
Fencing	3	2	2	7
Canoeing	3	1	0	4
Shooting	2	2	3	7
Rowing	2	2	1	5
Boxing	1	2	2	5
Sailing	1	1	0	2
Cycling	1	0	4	5
Equestrian events	1	0	0	1
Basketball	0	1	0	1
Water polo	0	1	0	1
Modern pentathlon	0	1	0	1
Diving	0	0	1	1
Total	43	29	31	103

== Boxing ==
Men's flyweight (– 51 kg)

- Sergey Sivko → Silver Medal

- First Round — Bye
- Second Round — Defeated Chung Shin-Cho (KOR), KO-1
- Third Round — Defeated Antoine Porcel (FRA), DSQ-3
- Quarterfinals — Defeated Manfred Homberg (FRG), 5:0
- Semifinals — Defeated Kiyoshi Tanabe (JPN), 4:1
- Final — Lost to Gyula Török (HUN), 2:3

== Cycling ==
13 male cyclists represented the Soviet Union in 1960.

Individual road race

- Viktor Kapitonov
- Yury Melikhov
- Yevgeny Klevtsov
- Gaynan Saydkhuzhin

Team time trial

- Viktor Kapitonov
- Yevgeny Klevtsov
- Yury Melikhov
- Aleksei Petrov

Sprint

- Boris Vasilyev
- Imants Bodnieks

1000 m time trial

- Rostislav Vargashkin

Tandem

- Boris Vasilyev
- Vladimir Leonov

Team pursuit

- Stanislav Moskvin
- Viktor Romanov
- Leonid Kolumbet
- Arnold Belgardt

== Diving ==
Men

Athlete	Event	Preliminary		Semi-final				Final			
Athlete	Event	Points	Rank	Points	Rank	Total	Rank	Points	Rank	Total	Rank
Vyacheslav Chernyshov	3 m springboard	50.87	17	Did not advance							
Yury Melnikov	3 m springboard	53.30	10 Q	38.56	13	91.86	12	Did not advance			
Gennady Galkin	10 m platform	54.07	5 Q	42.67	5	96.74	5 Q	44.95	7	141.69	6
Anatoly Sysoyev	10 m platform	54.03	6 Q	39.00	7	93.03	8 Q	42.56	8	135.59	8

Women

Athlete	Event	Preliminary		Semi-final				Final			
Athlete	Event	Points	Rank	Points	Rank	Total	Rank	Points	Rank	Total	Rank
Yelena Kosolapova	3 m springboard	47.88	12 Q	36.13	12	84.01	11	Did not advance			
Ninel Krutova	3 m springboard	52.35	4 Q	39.84	3	92.19	2 Q	43.92	5	136.11	5
Raisa Gorokhovskaya	10 m platform	51.53	8 Q	—N/a				31.50	5	83.03	5
Ninel Krutova	10 m platform	53.38	3 Q	—N/a				33.61	3	86.99	3rd place, bronze medalist(s)

== Fencing ==
21 fencers, 15 men and 6 women, represented the Soviet Union in 1960.

Men's foil

- Viktor Zhdanovich
- Yury Sisikin
- Mark Midler

Men's team foil

- Viktor Zhdanovich, Yury Sisikin, Mark Midler, German Sveshnikov, Yury Rudov

Men's épée

- Bruno Habārovs
- Guram Kostava
- Arnold Chernushevich

Men's team épée

- Guram Kostava, Bruno Habārovs, Arnold Chernushevich, Valentin Chernikov, Aleksandr Pavlovsky

Men's sabre

- David Tyshler
- Yakov Rylsky
- Nugzar Asatiani

Men's team sabre

- Yevgeny Cherepovsky, Umyar Mavlikhanov, Nugzar Asatiani, David Tyshler, Yakov Rylsky

Women's foil

- Valentina Rastvorova
- Galina Gorokhova
- Aleksandra Zabelina

Women's team foil

- Valentina Rastvorova, Galina Gorokhova, Tatyana Petrenko-Samusenko, Lyudmila Shishova, Valentina Prudskova, Aleksandra Zabelina

== Modern pentathlon ==
Three male pentathletes represented the Soviet Union in 1960. In the team event, they won the silver medal.

Individual

- Igor Novikov
- Nikolay Tatarinov
- Hanno Selg

Team

- Igor Novikov
- Nikolay Tatarinov
- Hanno Selg

== Rowing ==
The Soviet Union had 25 male rowers participate in seven rowing events in 1960.

Men's single sculls – 1st place ( Gold medal)

- Vyacheslav Ivanov (Вячеслав Иванов)

Men's double sculls – 2nd place ( Silver medal)

- Aleksandr Berkutov (Александр Беркутов)
- Yuriy Tyukalov (Юрий Тюкалов)

Men's coxless pair – 1st place ( Gold medal)

- Valentin Boreyko (Валентин Борейко)
- Oleg Golovanov (Олег Голованов)

Men's coxed pair – 2nd place ( Silver medal)

- Antanas Bagdonavičius (Antanas Bagdonavichyus, Антанас Багдонавичюс)
- Zigmas Jukna (Zigmas Yukna, Зигмас Юкна)
- Igor Rudakov (Игорь Рудаков)

Men's coxless four – 3rd place ( Bronze medal)

- Igor Akhremchik (Игорь Ахремчик)
- Yury Bachurov (Юрий Бачуров)
- Valentin Morkovkin (Валентин Морковкин)
- Anatoly Tarabrin (Анатолий Тарабрин)

Men's coxed four – 4th place

- Oleg Aleksandrov (Олег Александров)
- Igor Khokhlov (Игорь Хохлов)
- Boris Fyodorov (Борис Фёдоров)
- Valentin Zanin (Валентин Занин)
- Igor Rudakov (Игорь Рудаков)

Men's eight

- Mikhail Balenkov (Михаил Баленков)
- Viktor Barinov (Виктор Баринов)
- Viktor Bogachev (Виктор Богачев)
- Voldemar Dundur (Вольдемар Дундур)
- Nikolay Gomolko (Николай Гомолко)
- Boris Gorokhov (Борис Горохов)
- Leonid Ivanov (Леонид Иванов)
- Vladimir Malik (Владимир Малик)
- Yury Lorentsson (Юрий Лоренцсон)

== Shooting ==
Ten shooters represented the Soviet Union in 1960. Between them, they won three bronze medals, two silvers and two golds.

25 m pistol

- Aleksandr Zabelin
- Yevgeny Cherkasov

50 m pistol

- Aleksey Gushchin
- Makhmud Umarov

300 m rifle, three positions

- Vasily Borisov
- Moisei Itkis

50 m rifle, three positions

- Viktor Shamburkin
- Marat Nyýazow

50 m rifle, prone

- Vasily Borisov
- Marat Nyýazow

Trap

- Sergey Kalinin
- Yury Nikandrov

== Swimming ==
Men

Athlete	Event	Heat		Semifinal		Final	
Athlete	Event	Time	Rank	Time	Rank	Time	Rank
Igor Luzhkovsky	100 m freestyle	57.9	=19 Q	57.5	14	Did not advance	
Vitaly Sorokin	100 m freestyle	58.2	=23 Q	58.7	23	Did not advance	
Leonid Kolesnikov	400 m freestyle	DNF		—N/a		Did not advance	
Gennady Androsov	1500 m freestyle	18:39.0	16	—N/a		Did not advance	
Leonid Barbier	100 m backstroke	1:03.5	4 Q	1:04.3	7 Q	1:03.5	5
Veiko Siimar	100 m backstroke	1:04.6	9 Q	1:04.6	8 Q	1:04.6	8
Arkady Golovchenko	200 m breaststroke	2:41.0	6 Q	2:40.9	9	Did not advance	
Georgy Prokopenko	200 m breaststroke	2:39.2	4 Q	2:41.0	10	Did not advance	
Grigory Kiselyov	200 m butterfly	2:24.6	=13 Q	2:24.8	11	Did not advance	
Valentin Kuzmin	200 m butterfly	2:19.3	6 Q	2:19.1	3 Q	2:18.9	7
Igor Luzhkovsky; Gennady Nikolayev; Vitaly Sorokin; Boris Nikitin; Serhiy Tovstoplet	4 × 200 m freestyle	8:30.6	=7 Q	—N/a		8:32.8	8
Leonid Barbier; Leonid Kolesnikov; Grigory Kiselyov; Igor Luzhkovsky	4 × 100 m medley	4:16.2	7 Q	—N/a		4:16.8	5

Women

Athlete	Event	Heat		Semifinal		Final	
Athlete	Event	Time	Rank	Time	Rank	Time	Rank
Marina Shamal	100 m freestyle	1:06.4	=17	Did not advance			
Ulvi Voog	100 m freestyle	1:06.7	19	Did not advance			
Lyudmila Klipova	100 m backstroke	1:14.5	19	—N/a		Did not advance	
Larisa Viktorova	100 m backstroke	1:12.8	10	—N/a		Did not advance	
Lyudmila Korobova	200 m breaststroke	3:02.7	21	—N/a		Did not advance	
Eve-Mai Maurer	200 m breaststroke	3:03.1	22	—N/a		Did not advance	
Zinaida Belovetskaya	100 m butterfly	1:12.6	7 Q	—N/a		1:13.3	6
Valentina Poznyak	100 m butterfly	1:13.2	=9	—N/a		Did not advance	
Irina Lyakhovskaya; Ulvi Voog; Galina Sosnova; Marina Shamal	4 × 100 m freestyle	4:31.9	8 Q	—N/a		4:29.0	8
Larisa Viktorova; Lyudmila Korobova; Zinaida Belovetskaya; Marina Shamal; Valentina Poznyak	4 × 100 m medley	4:54.4	6 Q	—N/a		4:58.1	8

== Medals by republic ==
In the following table for team events number of team representatives, who received medals are counted, not "one medal for all the team", as usual. Because there were people from different republics in one team.

Rank	Republic	Gold	Silver	Bronze	Total
1	Russian SFSR	39	31	30	100
2	Ukrainian SSR	16	11	6	33
3	Byelorussian SSR	4	2	2	8
4	Georgian SSR	2	5	3	10
5	Armenian SSR	1	2	1	4
6	Latvian SSR	0	4	2	6
7	Lithuanian SSR	0	2	1	3
8	Azerbaijan SSR	0	2	0	2
8	Estonian SSR	0	2	0	2
10	Moldavian SSR	0	1	0	1
10	Turkmen SSR	0	1	0	1
Totals (11 entries)		62	63	45	170
