= Bydgoszcz Rowing Association =

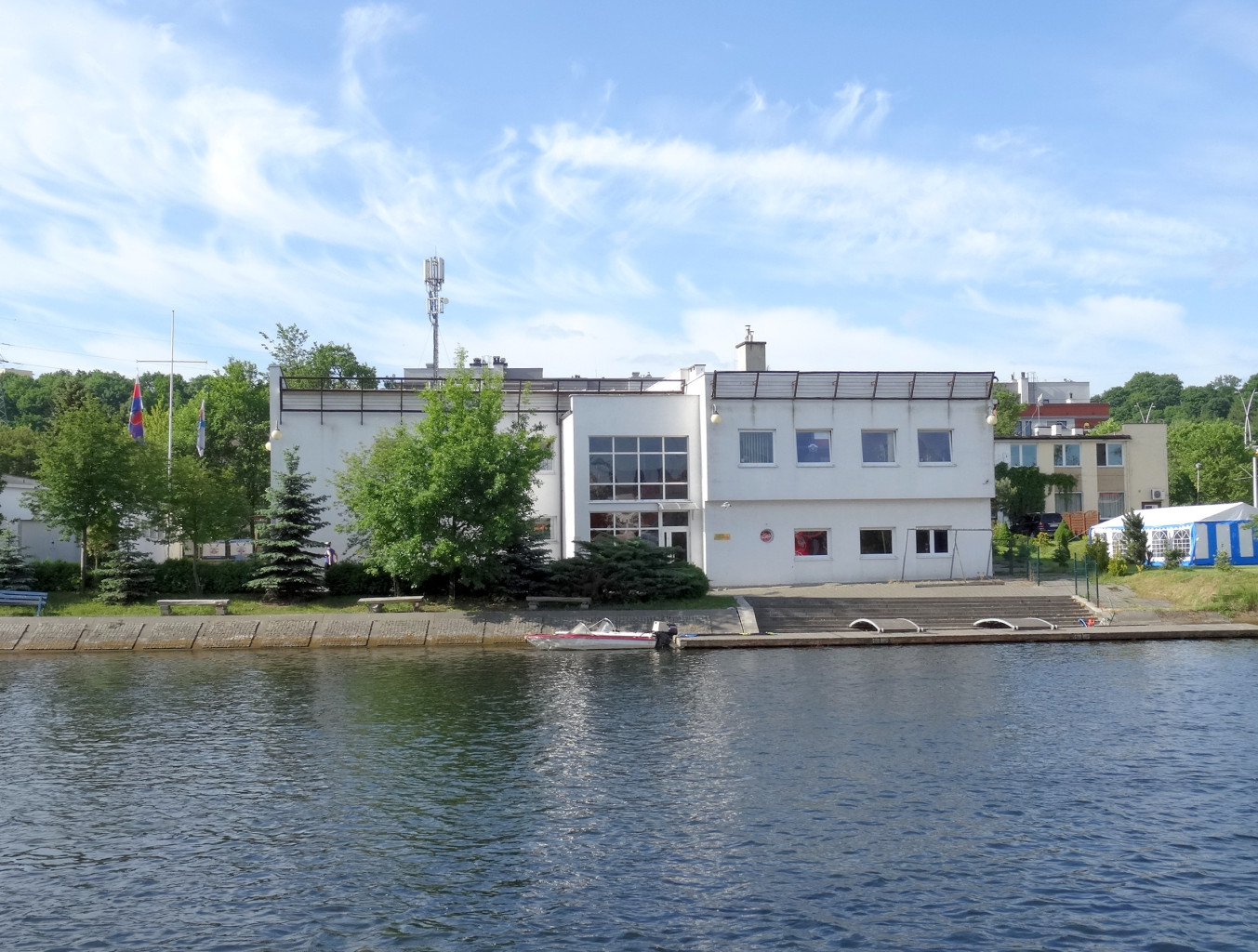
Marina of the Bydgoszcz Rowing Association on the Brda river in Bydgoszcz

Bydgoszcz Rowing Association (Polish: Bydgoskie Towarzystwo Wioślarskie, BTW) is a sports club founded on 16 March 1920 as Towarzystwo Wioślarzy Tryton Bydgoszcz (Bydgoszcz Tryton Rowing Association). It is one of the oldest Polish sports clubs in Bydgoszcz and was one of the leading rowing clubs in Poland during the interwar period.

== Overview ==
Bydgoszcz Rowing Association is the oldest Polish club in Bydgoszcz specializing in rowing. The club's headquarters are located at 2 Żupy Street in Bydgoszcz, on the banks of the Brda river, where its boathouse is also situated. Approximately four coaches train athletes in various age groups (seniors, juniors, and cadets). The club has a cooperation agreement with School Complex No. 8 at 4 Pijarów Street in Bydgoszcz for rowing training within the sports class at Gymnasium No. 33. Since 2000, in addition to the rowing section, a tourism kayaking section has been active.

== History ==
=== Interwar period ===
On 16 March 1920, in the hall of Hotel Pod Orlem, a group of Bydgoszcz activists from the Sokół movement, with representatives from the Poznań Tryton Rowing Association, resolved to establish the Bydgoszcz Tryton Rowing Association as a counterbalance to German clubs, primarily Frithjof Rowing Club Bydgoszcz. The club's statute, board, and emblem were established, and a banner was adopted in 1924. Without its own headquarters and using boats borrowed from the Humanistic Gymnasium, Tryton entered two crews in the first all-Polish regatta at the Bydgoszcz Regatta Course on 29 June 1920, one of which won second place. On 31 August 1920, to distinguish itself from the Poznań Tryton, the club changed its name to Bydgoszcz Rowing Association. In 1921, it acquired its first boat, named Henryk after its sponsor, from the Poznań Rowing Club's fleet. By 1921, BTW had its own boathouse near the Bernardyński Bridge and six boats. On 3 July 1921, at the second Polish championships at the Bydgoszcz Regatta Course, the BTW crew (Leon Twardowski, Witecki, Gole, and Paweł Twardowski) won the Polish championship title in the coxed four, along with the Kraków Sokół Cup. The same award was won again on 15 August 1922.

In 1924, a boathouse was opened at the Bydgoszcz Regatta Course, and the fleet was expanded by six boats. At the Polish championships, newly built stands were filled by a 5,000-strong audience, including President of Poland Stanisław Wojciechowski. The national press dubbed Bydgoszcz's rowing center "Polish Henley". In 1924, the rowing section was expanded to include student and military groups. The club promoted water sports. BTW activists helped establish the Bydgoszcz Women's Rowing Club in 1926 and the Association of Gymnastic Rowing Societies from the Poznań and Pomeranian voivodeships. In 1927, at the initiative of BTW members, the Pomeranian District of the Polish Swimming Association was founded, followed by the Bydgoszcz Committee of Rowing Associations in 1928. In 1926, sections for winter sports (hockey, ice skating) and fencing were opened. The swimming section, established in 1927, took first place in Pomerania in its inaugural year. In 1928, BTW's winter sports section joined the Polish Ice Hockey Federation in Warsaw, becoming a pioneer of ice hockey in Kuyavia and Pomerania. By 1930, the section had 72 BTW members.

The year 1926 brought significant success for BTW. At the European Rowing Championships in Lucerne, the Bydgoszcz eight won a bronze medal, the first international rowing medal for Poland. This achievement brought fame to BTW and led to the first international regatta at the Bydgoszcz Regatta Course in 1927, with participants from 10 foreign and 21 Polish clubs. BTW crews represented Poland at the European Championships in 1931, 1933, and 1934. In 1927, BTW ranked first among Polish rowing clubs and associations. The greatest achievement of Bydgoszcz and Polish rowing in the interwar period was the bronze medal won by BTW's coxed four at the Amsterdam 1928 Olympics.

From 16 to 19 August 1929, BTW organized the European Rowing Championships at the Bydgoszcz Regatta Course. The city expanded the stands to accommodate 30,000 spectators. Eleven national teams with 152 athletes in 35 crews competed. Italy topped the medal table (17 points), followed by the Netherlands and Poland (5 points each). A Polish coxless four, composed of Bydgoszcz Olympic medalists (with Bernard Ormanowski replaced by Jerzy Braun), won a bronze medal. In 1928, BTW competed in seven regattas, winning 16 first places, and in 1929, it won 15 first places in seven regattas. In 1930, BTW was awarded a diploma by the Association of Polish Sports Clubs and the Polish Olympic Committee for its contributions to Polish rowing.

At the Los Angeles 1932 Olympics, former BTW member Jerzy Braun won a silver medal in the coxed pair (with Janusz Ślązak from Warsaw and coxswain Jerzy Skolimowski) and a bronze in the coxed four (with Janusz Ślązak, Edward Kobyliński, Stanisław Urban, and Jerzy Skolimowski). He also competed at the Berlin 1936 Olympics in the coxed pair and won a silver medal at the 1933 European Championships in Budapest in the coxed pair (with Ślązak and Skolimowski).

In 1934, BTW crews achieved 11 victories in eight regattas, and in 1935, 14 victories, placing the club third in the Polish Association of Rowing Societies points table. By winning the eights championship for the third time, BTW permanently claimed the President of Poland's award.

The peak of BTW's interwar achievements came in 1937. Athletes competed in 13 national and international regattas, achieving 23 victories, securing first place in Poland's club rankings. That year, the number of active athletes reached 240. In 1938 and 1939, the Bydgoszcz Railway Sports Club took the lead in Bydgoszcz and Polish rowing, with several BTW athletes transferring to it.

During the German occupation, the club could not operate. 27 BTW members died in executions or on the fronts of World War II. Olympic medalist Edmund Jankowski was executed in October 1939 in the Valley of Death.

Interwar period

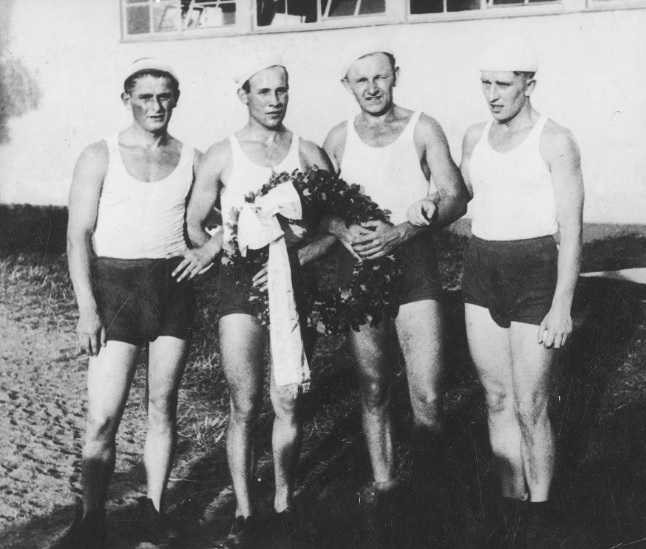
Coxless four BTW – Polish champions 1932

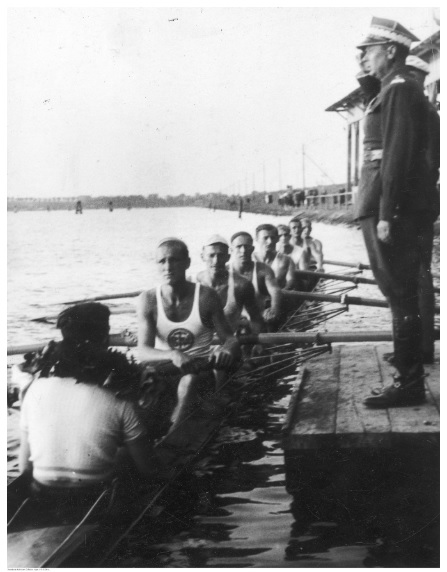
Polish champion eight BTW 1936

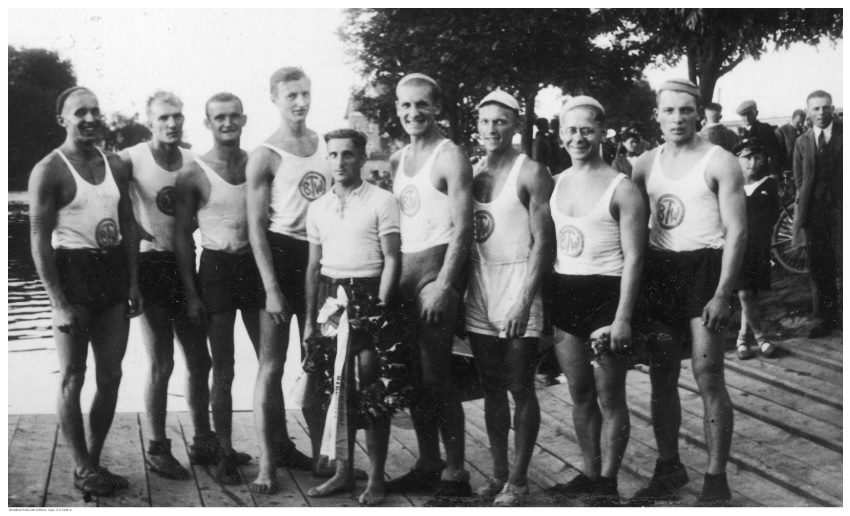
Polish champions 1936

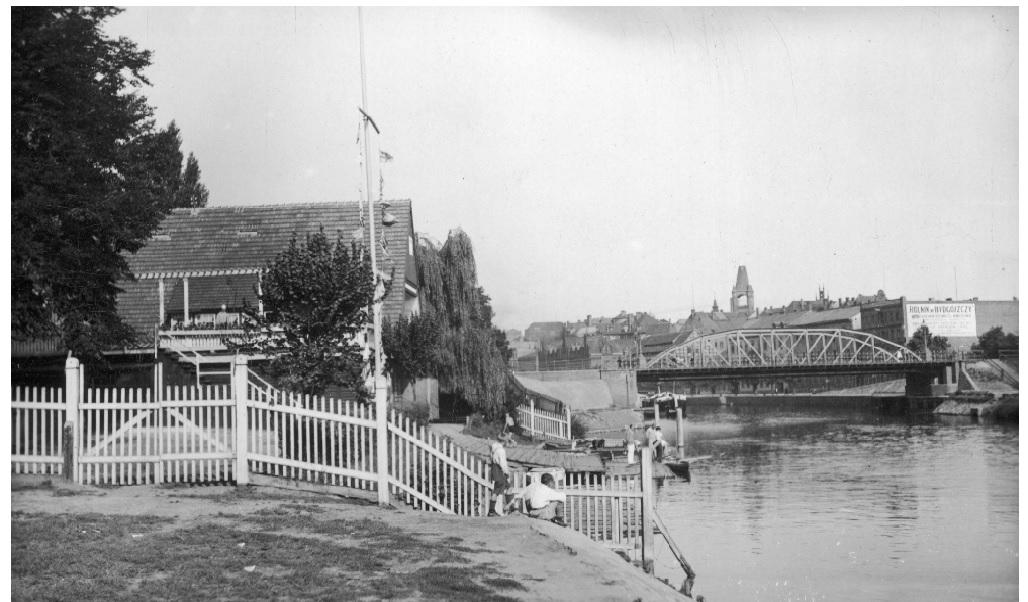
BTW Bydgoszcz boathouse in 1938

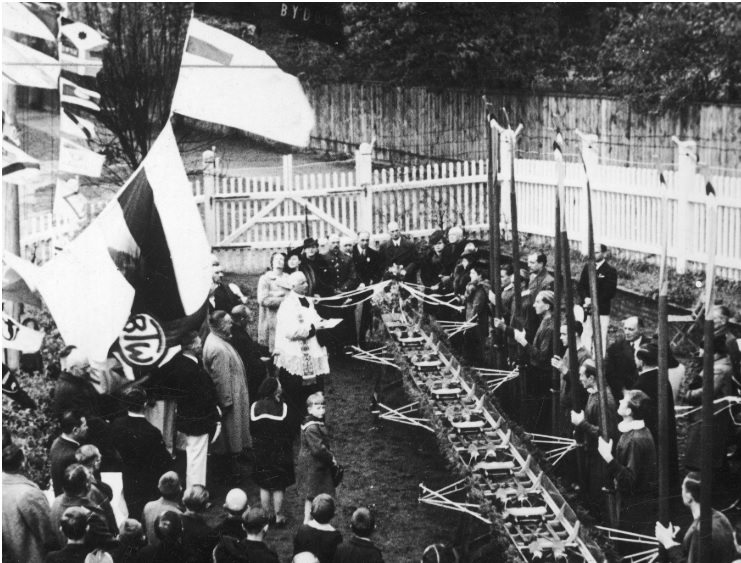
Dedication of BTW's eight in 1939

=== Post-war period ===
During the January 1945 fighting, BTW's headquarters burned down, and the Bydgoszcz Regatta Course was devastated. The only chance for BTW's revival was joining the newly formed Bydgoszcz Sports Club under the city's administration, creating a rowing section. The club was granted use of the palace of the former German Frithjof Rowing Club Bydgoszcz. On 7 October 1945, BTW became independent again, operating under the Union of Youth Struggle with Witold Czajkowski as president. Former members and athletes of the Bydgoszcz Women's Rowing Club were integrated into BTW's women's rowing section. On 12 August 1945, BTW organized the first post-war Polish rowing championships in Bydgoszcz, with 226 athletes from 16 clubs. BTW's women's four won the championship, the men's four took silver, and the men's eight won bronze.

On 30 September 1945, the Polish Association of Rowing Societies was reactivated at BTW's headquarters, which remained in Bydgoszcz until 1948. By late 1947, BTW had 408 members, making it one of Bydgoszcz's largest sports clubs. From 1946 to 1950 (except 1949), the club topped the Polish Association of Rowing Societies team rankings, and in 1948, its coxed four broke the 1929 Bydgoszcz Regatta Course record. The coxed four (cox Egon Szyperski, Henryk and Teodor Kocerka, Zygmunt Kościelniak, and Ludwik Suligowski) dominated national regattas but was not sent to the London 1948 Olympics due to lack of funds. In 1949, provincial security authorities infiltrated BTW with secret agents to discredit activists perceived as hostile to the new regime, targeting co-founder Witold Czajkowski. In 1951, inspired by the Security Office, negative political reports were issued against Ludwik Suligowski and Henryk Kocerka, barring them from international competitions, including the Helsinki 1952 Olympics.

In 1949, following the Soviet-style reorganization of Polish sports, BTW was subordinated to sports associations, initially ZS Związkowiec, and from 1 January 1951, to the Stal Metalworkers' Union under the patronage of United Bicycle Works Romet and Belma Electromechanical Works. The club's flagship was the coxless pair of Bogdan Poniatowski and Henryk Kocerka, achieving second and third places nationally (1953, 1954). From 1945 to 1956, BTW athletes won 21 men's and 3 women's national championship gold medals, and the Bydgoszcz Regatta Course hosted Poland's major rowing events.

After the Polish October, BTW regained its identity. Membership grew tenfold, and the women's section reestablished the Bydgoszcz Women's Rowing Club. The most outstanding BTW athlete from 1948 to 1960 was Teodor Kocerka, winning two Olympic bronze medals (Helsinki 1952 for AZS Warsaw and Rome 1960 for AZS Szczecin), 19 Polish championship titles in single, double, four, and eight, and medals in every European Championship from 1953 to 1960. In 1956 and 1957, he won the prestigious Diamond Sculls for single sculls at the Henley Royal Regatta on the Thames.

In 1962, four BTW athletes competed in the World Championships, and from 1954 to 1974, 10 participated in the European Rowing Championships, including Bogdan Poniatowski (5 times), Henryk Kocerka and Antoni Rosołowicz (3 times each), Teodor Kocerka, Benedykt Augustyniak, and Marian Lewandowski (2 times each), plus Kazimierz Neumann, Wanda Laskowska, Jachowska, and Zielińska. After 1967, BTW's senior crews ceased participating in international regattas, world championships, or Olympics. Success returned in the 1990s. In 1995, Paprocki won the Masters World Championship in singles, and in 1997, he became European champion in singles and vice-champion in double sculls. In 1998, the BTW double sculls team (Ratkowski, Pawłowski) won first place in the Polish Youth Championships.

In 2004, BTW seniors achieved their first success in decades when the coxed pair (Piotr Hojka and Rafał Piecuch) won the Polish championship. Notable alumni include Michał Stawowski, a two-time Olympian (Athens 2004, Beijing 2008) in the coxed eight; Piotr Hojka, a European Championship medalist and Beijing 2008 Olympian in double sculls; and Jakub Jabłoński, youth world champion (eight). Dawid Kalinowski became the 2008 European Academic Champion and 2009 bronze medalist in lightweight singles. Junior coxed fours (men's and women's) also won Polish championship medals. In 2011, BTW won 6 junior championship medals, ranking third in the team standings, and in 2012, it won 16 medals across various categories, placing fifth in the Polish Association of Rowing Societies Team Championship.

== Sports facilities ==
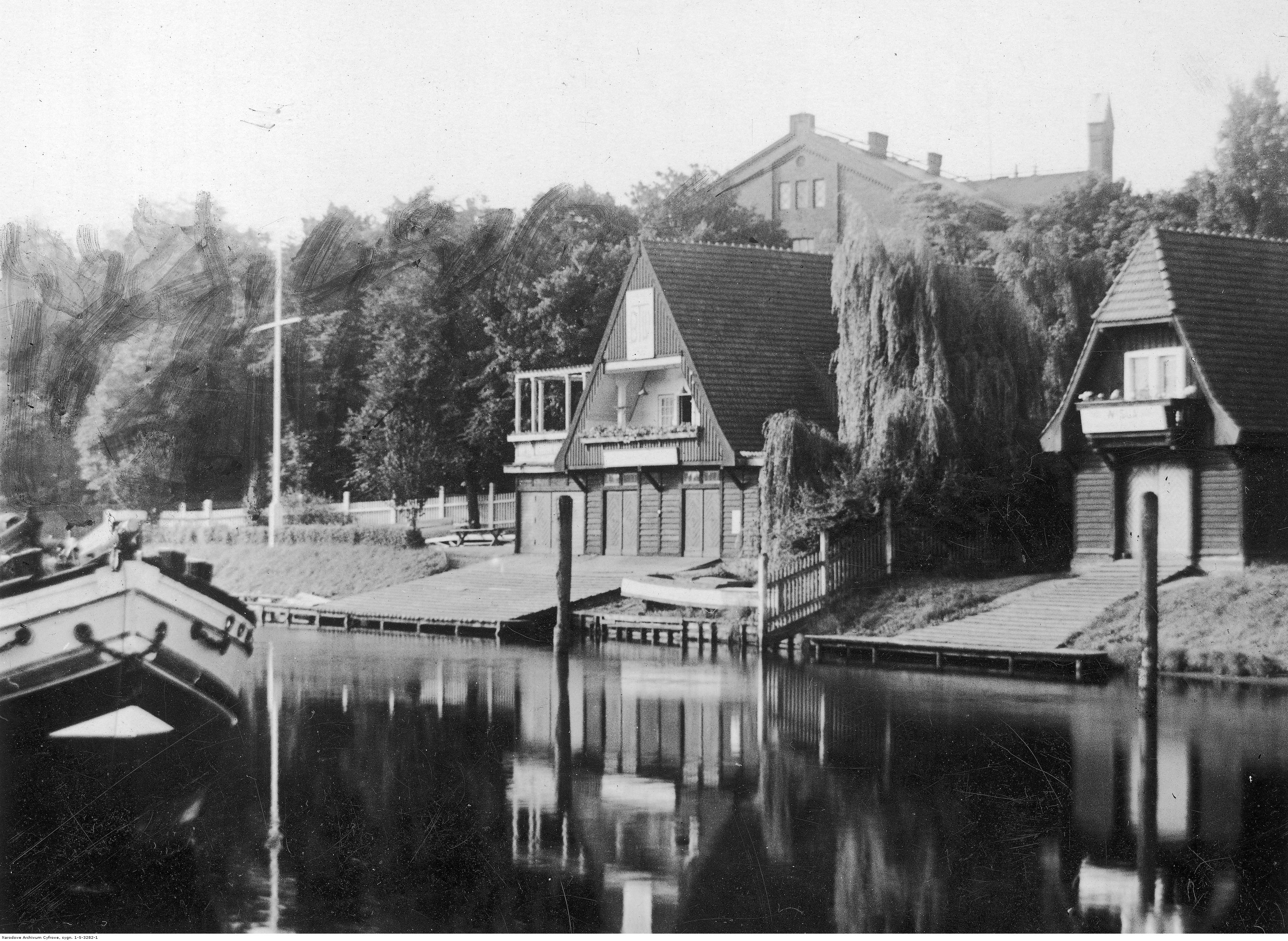
BTW boathouse in the interwar period

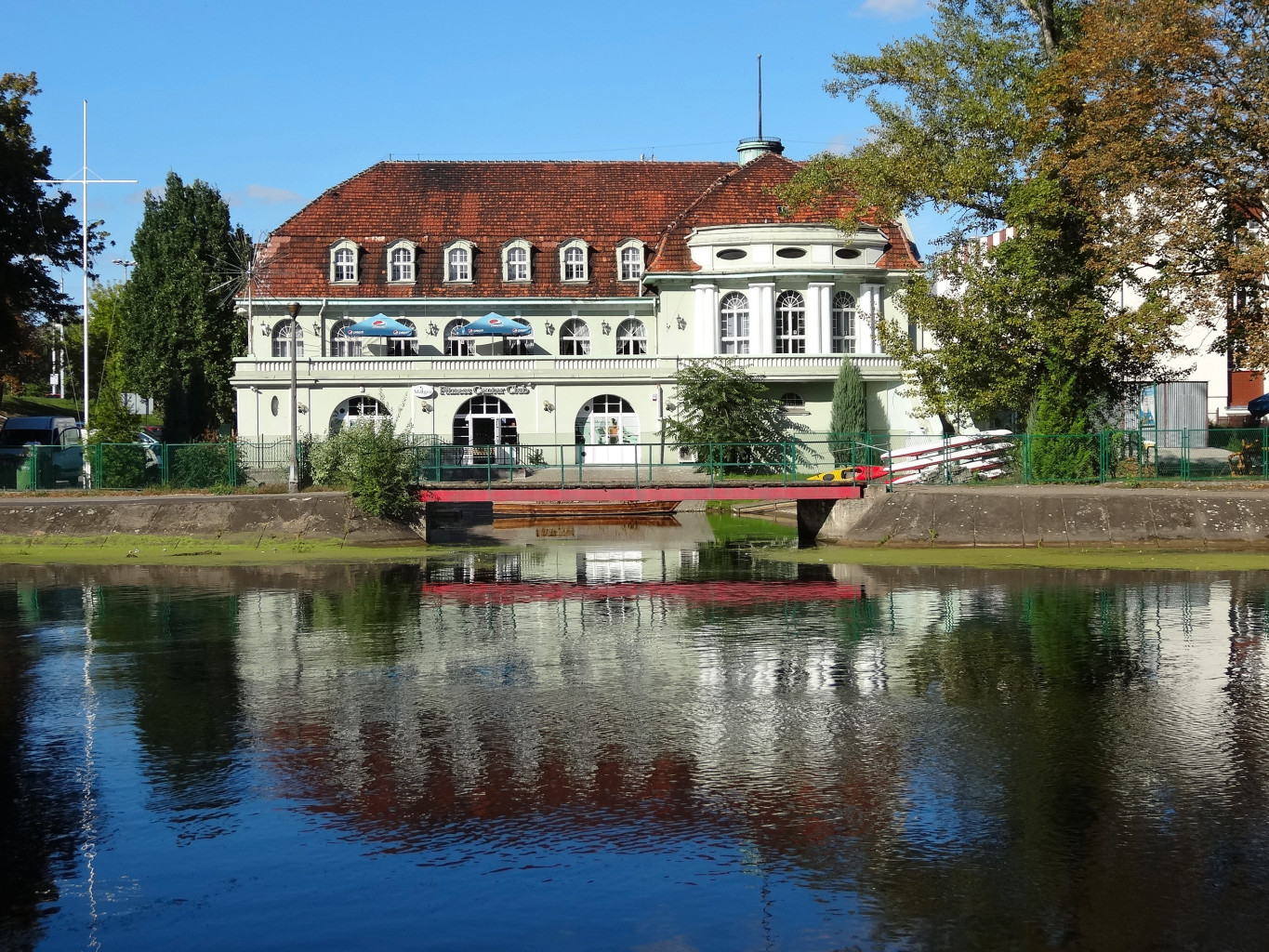
Headquarters from 1945 to 1996 (former German Frithjof Rowing Club Bydgoszcz palace)

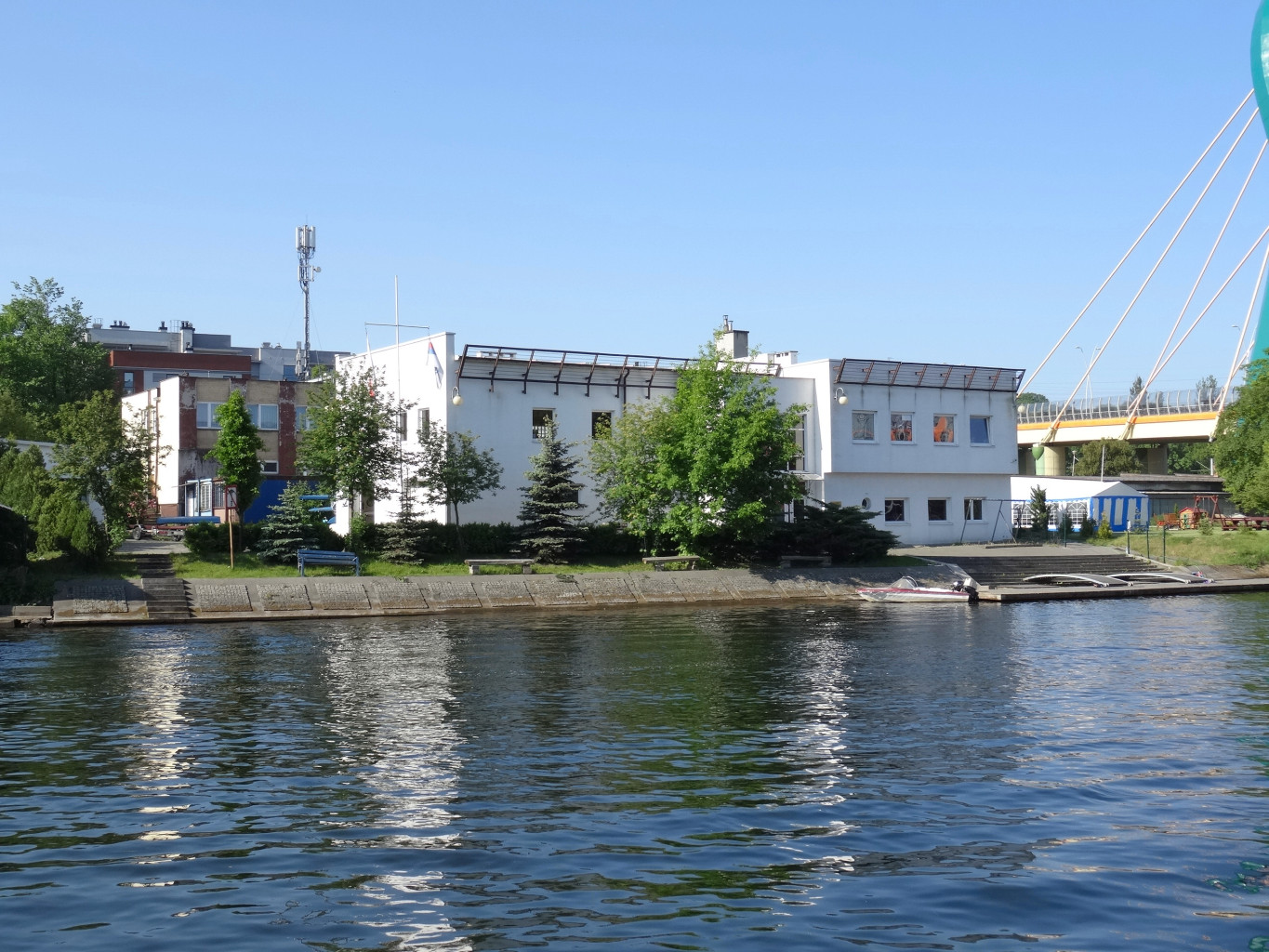
BTW boathouse since 1999

By late 1920, with 100 members, BTW sought its own headquarters. The Bydgoszcz magistrate leased a shed near the Bernardyński Bridge, opposite the German Frithjof Rowing Club Bydgoszcz's masonry headquarters. In summer 1923, electricity, a telephone, and fencing were installed. BTW owned land around the Bydgoszcz Regatta Course, leasing a "rowing resort" in 1924. On 3 August 1924, BTW built wooden stands at its own expense, expanded by the magistrate in 1929. On behalf of the Polish Association of Rowing Societies, BTW organized Polish championships at the Bydgoszcz Regatta Course from 1920 to 1937 and the European Rowing Championships in August 1929. In 1929, a club ice rink was set up for ice hockey matches and ice skating in winter. The boathouse served as the start and finish for the annual Swim Across Bydgoszcz event. In 1936, the boathouse was renovated, and a pier was built to meet regatta club standards.

On 23 January 1945, the boathouse burned down when retreating Wehrmacht troops blew up the Bernardyński Bridge. Post-war, the city granted BTW the former German Frithjof Rowing Club Bydgoszcz's palace. In 1996, the magistrate sold it to a Chinese company from Shanghai, and in 1999, BTW relocated to premises bought from Dräger at 2 Żupy Street, behind the Bydgoszcz Construction Sports Club headquarters. From 2001 to 2007, with funds from the city of Bydgoszcz and the Ministry of Education and Sport, a new boathouse was built with a training room, gym, short and long boat hangars, a waterfront, and a floating pier.

== BTW athletes ==
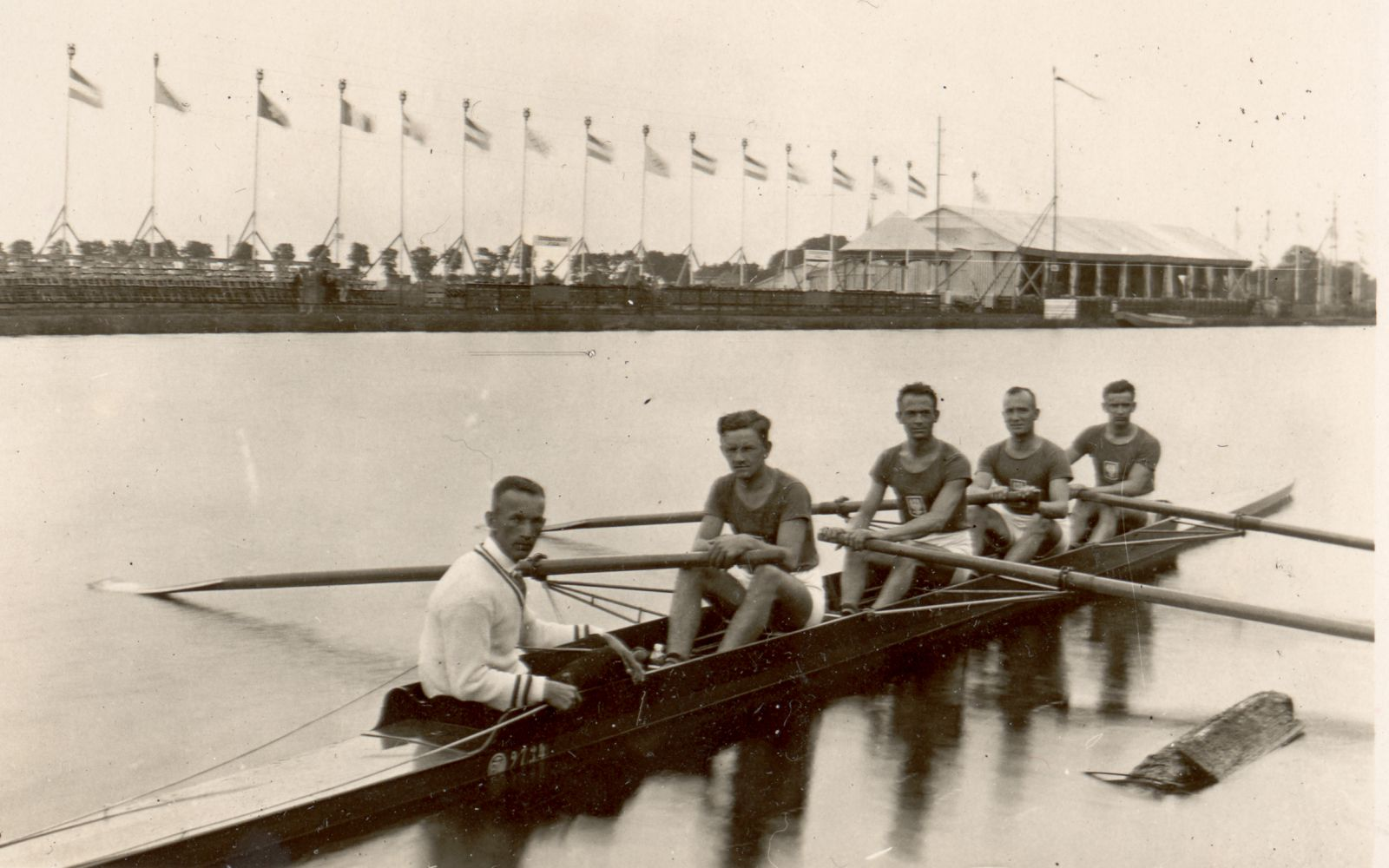
Coxed four BTW – 1928 Olympic bronze medalists

=== Team achievements ===
- Polish team rowing championships:
  - First place in 1926, 1937, 1946, 1947, 1948, 1950
  - Second place in 1927, 1928, 1929, 1930, 1954, 1959, 1966
  - Third place in 1931, 1933, 1934, 1935, 1936, 1945, 1953, 1957, 1960

Bydgoszcz Rowing Association dominated among the 12 rowing clubs active in Bydgoszcz during the interwar period and was among Poland's top clubs.

=== Individual achievements ===
From 1921 to 1977, BTW athletes won 48 individual Polish senior championship titles. In national competitions, they earned over 600 medals.

== Trivia ==
- In the 1930s, Jeremi Przybora, later creator of Kabaret Starszych Panów, was introduced to rowing at BTW's boathouse.
- In 2002, the Bydgoszcz Rowing Association Laurel award was established for individuals and institutions with significant contributions to the club.
