= Rowing at the 1960 Summer Olympics – Men's coxless four =

Men's coxless fours at the Games of the XVII Olympiad
- Venue: Lake Albano
- Date: 31 August – 3 September 1960
- Competitors: 64 from 16 nations

Medalists
1st place, gold medalist(s)		Arthur Ayrault; Ted Nash; John Sayre; Rusty Wailes	United States
2nd place, silver medalist(s)		Tullio Baraglia; Renato Bosatta; Giancarlo Crosta; Giuseppe Galante	Italy
3rd place, bronze medalist(s)		Igor Akhremchik; Yuriy Bachurov; Valentin Morkovkin; Anatoly Tarabrin	Soviet Union

The men's coxless fours competition at the 1960 Summer Olympics took place at Lake Albano, Italy. The event was held from August 31 until September 3.

== Competition format ==
This rowing competition consisted of two main rounds (heats and final), as well as a repechage round that allowed teams that did not win their heats to advance to the final. All races were 2,000 metres in distance.

- Heats: Three heats. With 16 boats entered, there were five or six boats per heat. The winner of each heat advanced directly to the final; all other boats went to the repechage.
- Repechage: Three heats. With 13 boats racing in but not winning their initial heats, there were four or five boats per repechage heat. The top boat in each repechage heat advanced to the final, with the remaining boats eliminated.
- Final: The final consisted of the six boats that had won either the preliminary heats or the repechage heats.

== Results ==
=== Heats ===
==== Heat 1 ====
Rank	Rowers	Nation	Time	Notes
1	Michael Beresford; Christopher Davidge; Colin Porter; John Vigurs	Great Britain	6:28.18	Q
2	Arthur Ayrault; Ted Nash; John Sayre; Rusty Wailes	United States	6:29.67	R
3	Benedykt Augustyniak; Kazimierz Neumann; Bogdan Poniatowski; Antoni Rosołowicz	Poland	6:34.20	R
4	Lajos Kiss; György Sarlós; József Sátori; Béla Zsitnik	Hungary	6:34.90	R
5	Hugo Christiansen; Mogens Jensen; Børge Kaas Andersen; Ole Kassow	Denmark	6:44.20	R
6	Eero Laine; Heikki Laine; Pertti Laine; Arto Nikulainen	Finland	7:08.95	R

==== Heat 2 ====
Rank	Rowers	Nation	Time	Notes
1	Jindřich Blažek; Miroslav Jíška; René Líbal; Jaroslav Starosta	Czechoslovakia	6:36.65	Q
2	Martin Bielz; Ionel Petrov; Ștefan Pongratz; Iosif Varga	Romania	6:43.45	R
3	David Lord; Jack Mok; Trevor Steyn; John Stocchi	South Africa	6:46.58	R
4	Peter Gillon; Peter Guest; Kim Jelbart; Brian Vear	Australia	6:49.83	R
5	Robert Adams; Clayton Brown; Chris Leach; Franklin Zielski	Canada	6:56.32	R

==== Heat 3 ====
Rank	Rowers	Nation	Time	Notes
1	Igor Akhremchik; Yuriy Bachurov; Valentin Morkovkin; Anatoly Tarabrin	Soviet Union	6:29.41	Q
2	Tullio Baraglia; Renato Bosatta; Giancarlo Crosta; Giuseppe Galante	Italy	6:31.84	R
3	Victor Hendrix; Manfred Kluth; Georg Niermann; Albrecht Wehselau	United Team of Germany	6:36.81	R
4	Paul Kölliker; Gottfried Kottmann; Kurt Schmid; Rolf Streuli	Switzerland	6:43.48	R
5	Juan Huber; Héctor Moni; Ángel Pontarolo; Vicente Vansteenkiste	Argentina	6:52.32	R

=== Repechage ===
==== Repechage heat 1 ====
Rank	Rowers	Nation	Time	Notes
1	Arthur Ayrault; Ted Nash; John Sayre; Rusty Wailes	United States	6:24.84	Q
2	Victor Hendrix; Manfred Kluth; Georg Niermann; Albrecht Wehselau	United Team of Germany	6:27.61	
3	Robert Adams; Clayton Brown; Chris Leach; Franklin Zielski	Canada	6:44.77	
4	Peter Gillon; Peter Guest; Kim Jelbart; Brian Vear	Australia	6:45.25	

==== Repechage heat 2 ====
Rank	Rowers	Nation	Time	Notes
1	Paul Kölliker; Gottfried Kottmann; Kurt Schmid; Rolf Streuli	Switzerland	6:42.19	Q
2	Martin Bielz; Ionel Petrov; Ștefan Pongratz; Iosif Varga	Romania	6:47.04	
3	Benedykt Augustyniak; Kazimierz Neumann; Bogdan Poniatowski; Antoni Rosołowicz	Poland	6:48.50	
4	Juan Huber; Héctor Moni; Ángel Pontarolo; Vicente Vansteenkiste	Argentina	6:56.35	
–	Eero Laine; Heikki Laine; Pertti Laine; Arto Nikulainen	Finland	DNS	

==== Repechage heat 3 ====
Rank	Rowers	Nation	Time	Notes
1	Tullio Baraglia; Renato Bosatta; Giancarlo Crosta; Giuseppe Galante	Italy	6:37.79	Q
2	Lajos Kiss; György Sarlós; József Sátori; Béla Zsitnik	Hungary	6:43.44	
3	Hugo Christiansen; Mogens Jensen; Børge Kaas Andersen; Ole Kassow	Denmark	6:49.75	
4	David Lord; Jack Mok; Trevor Steyn; John Stocchi	South Africa	6:50.32	

=== Final ===
Rank	Rowers	Nation	Time
1st place, gold medalist(s)	Arthur Ayrault; Ted Nash; John Sayre; Rusty Wailes	United States	6:26.26
2nd place, silver medalist(s)	Tullio Baraglia; Renato Bosatta; Giancarlo Crosta; Giuseppe Galante	Italy	6:28.78
3rd place, bronze medalist(s)	Igor Akhremchik; Yuriy Bachurov; Valentin Morkovkin; Anatoly Tarabrin	Soviet Union	6:29.62
4	Jindřich Blažek; Miroslav Jíška; René Líbal; Jaroslav Starosta	Czechoslovakia	6:34.30
5	Michael Beresford; Christopher Davidge; Colin Porter; John Vigurs	Great Britain	6:36.18
6	Paul Kölliker; Gottfried Kottmann; Kurt Schmid; Rolf Streuli	Switzerland	6:38.81
