= Diving at the 1960 Summer Olympics – Men's 10 metre platform =

Men's 10 metre platform at the Games of the XVII Olympiad

Medalists
1st place, gold medalist(s)		Bob Webster	United States
2nd place, silver medalist(s)		Gary Tobian	United States
3rd place, bronze medalist(s)		Brian Phelps	Great Britain

The men's 10 metre platform, also reported as 10-metre high diving, was one of four diving events on the Diving at the 1960 Summer Olympics programme.

The competition was split into three phases:

1. Preliminary round (31 August)
  Divers performed four voluntary dives without limit of degrees of difficulty. The sixteen divers with the highest scores advanced to the semi-finals.
2. Semi-final (1 September)
  Divers performed three voluntary dives without limit of degrees of difficulty. The eight divers with the highest combined scores from the preliminary round and semi-final advanced to the final.
3. Final (2 September)
  Divers performed three voluntary dives without limit of degrees of difficulty. The final ranking was determined by the combined score from all three rounds.

== Results ==
Rank	Diver	Nation	Preliminary		Semi-final				Final		
Rank	Diver	Nation	Points	Rank	Points	Rank	Total	Rank	Points	Rank	Total
1st place, gold medalist(s)	Bob Webster	United States	52.21	9	47.51	2	99.72	3	65.84	1	165.56
2nd place, silver medalist(s)	Gary Tobian	United States	54.10	4	51.98	1	106.08	1	59.17	2	165.25
3rd place, bronze medalist(s)	Brian Phelps	Great Britain	57.35	1	44.50	3	101.85	2	55.28	4	157.13
4	Roberto Madrigal	Mexico	52.03	10	43.85	4	95.88	6	56.98	3	152.86
5	Rolf Sperling	United Team of Germany	57.25	2	38.59	8	96.83	4	55.00	5	151.83
6	Gennady Galkin	Soviet Union	54.07	5	42.67	5	96.74	5	44.95	7	141.69
7	Fritz Enskat	United Team of Germany	51.23	13	41.80	6	93.03	7	45.83	6	138.86
8	Anatoly Sysoyev	Soviet Union	54.03	6	39.00	7	93.03	8	42.56	8	135.59
9	Kurt Mrkwicka	Austria	55.13	3	36.24	14	91.37	9	did not advance		
10	Shunsuke Kaneto	Japan	52.65	7	38.34	11	90.99	10	did not advance		
11	Göran Lundqvist	Sweden	52.32	8	38.54	9	90.86	11	did not advance		
12	Toivo Öhman	Sweden	50.97	15	38.53	10	89.50	12	did not advance		
13	Ryo Mabuchi	Japan	51.12	14	38.01	12	89.13	13	did not advance		
14	Antonio Sbordone	Italy	51.90	11	36.87	13	88.77	14	did not advance		
15	Jerzy Kowalewski	Poland	51.24	12	35.98	15	87.22	15	did not advance		
16	Henri Rouquet	France	50.74	16	32.81	16	83.55	16	did not advance		
17	John Candler	Great Britain	50.20	17	did not advance						
18	Fabio Paiella	Italy	50.01	18	did not advance						
18	Konkoly János	Hungary	50.01	18	did not advance						
20	Alvaro Gaxiola	Mexico	49.30	20	did not advance						
21	Tomáš Bauer	Czechoslovakia	46.06	21	did not advance						
22	Ernest Meissner	Canada	45.71	22	did not advance						
23	Dóra József	Hungary	45.51	23	did not advance						
24	Ahmed Moharran	Egypt	45.10	24	did not advance						
25	Moustafa Hassan	Egypt	43.82	25	did not advance						
26	Pekka Heinonen	Finland	43.49	26	did not advance						
27	Barry Holmes	Australia	40.24	27	did not advance						
28	Lee Pil-jung	South Korea	28.34	28	did not advance						
