= Augustyniak =

Augustyniak is a surname. Notable people with the surname include:

- Benedykt Augustyniak (1932–2017), Polish rower
- Jerry Augustyniak (born 1958), American drummer
- Julie Augustyniak (born 1979), American soccer player
- Mike Augustyniak (born 1956), American football player
- Mirosław Augustyniak (born 1963), Polish politician
- Nancy Augustyniak Goffi (born 1979), American soccer player
- Rafał Augustyniak (born 1993), Polish association football player
- Urszula Augustyniak (born 1950), Polish historian and academic
