= Lajos Kiss =

Lajos Kiss may refer to:

- Lajos Kiss (ethnomusicologist) (1900–1982), Hungarian ethnomusicologist, music educator, academic administrator, conductor, editor, and folk-song collector
- Lajos Kiss (rower), (1940–2009), Hungarian rower and Olympian
- Lajos Kiss (sprint canoer), (1934–2014), Hungarian sprint canoer and Olympic medalist
