= Iosif Varga =

Iosif Varga may refer to:

- Iosif Varga (rower) (born 1934), Romanian rower
- Iosif Varga (footballer) (1941–1992), Romanian footballer
