= Gottfried Kottmann =

Swiss rower and bobsledder (1932–1964)

Personal information
- Born: Gottfried Kottmann; 15 October 1932 Zürich
- Died: 6 November 1964 (aged 32) Rüdlingen

Sport
- Sport: Rowing; Bobsledding
- Club: Belvoir RC,
Medal record
Representing Switzerland
Men's rowing
Olympic Games
Bronze medal – third place	1964 Tokyo	Single sculls
European Rowing Championships
Gold medal – first place	1954 Amsterdam	Coxed pair
Gold medal – first place	1955 Ghent	Coxed pair
Silver medal – second place	1956 Bled	Coxed pair
Bronze medal – third place	1957 Duisburg	Coxed four
Bronze medal – third place	1958 Poznań	Coxed pair
Gold medal – first place	1959 Mâcon	Coxless four
Men's bobsleigh
World Championship
Bronze medal – third place	1960 Cortina d'Ampezzo	Four-man

Gottfried "Göpf" Kottmann (15 October 1932 – 6 November 1964) was a Swiss rower and bobsledder who competed from the mid-1950s until his death by drowning shortly after his second Olympic appearance in 1964.

== Biography ==
Kottmann, born 1932 in Zürich, started rowing aged 13 with Belvoir Ruderclub in his home city. For several years, he rowed with Rolf Streuli and various coxswains in the coxed pair event. They won the European Rowing Championships in 1954 in Amsterdam, in 1955 in Ghent, and came second in 1956 in Bled. They had qualified for the 1956 Summer Olympics in Melbourne but Switzerland was one of four countries to boycott the Games over the Soviet invasion of Hungary. At the 1958 European Rowing Championships in Poznań, Kottmann and Streuli won bronze.

At the 1959 European Rowing Championships in Mâcon, Kottmann won a gold medal in the coxless four event. Two of the four rowers remained part of the coxless four that went to the 1960 Summer Olympics in Rome, where they came sixth.

Kottmann won a bronze medal in the four-man bobsleigh event at the 1960 FIBT World Championships in Cortina d'Ampezzo.

In 1963, Kottmann won the Diamond Challenge Sculls (the premier singles sculls event) at the Henley Royal Regatta, rowing for Belvoir RC.

At the 1964 European Rowing Championships in Amsterdam, he competed in single sculls and came in sixth place. Two months later competing at the 1964 Summer Olympics in Tokyo, he won a bronze medal in the single sculls event.

He drowned in the Rhine at Rüdlingen while taking part in a military exercise as a diver.
