= Tarabrin =

Tarabrin (Russian: Тарабрин) is a Russian masculine surname, its feminine counterpart is Tarabrina. Notable people with the surname include:

- Alexandr Tarabrin (born 1985), Kazakhstani swimmer
- Anatoly Tarabrin (1934–2008), Russian rower
- Dmitri Tarabrin (born 1976), Russian ice hockey player
