= Villers-Sainte-Gertrude =

Villers-Sainte-Gertrude Viyé-Sinte-Djetrou (Walloon)
- village
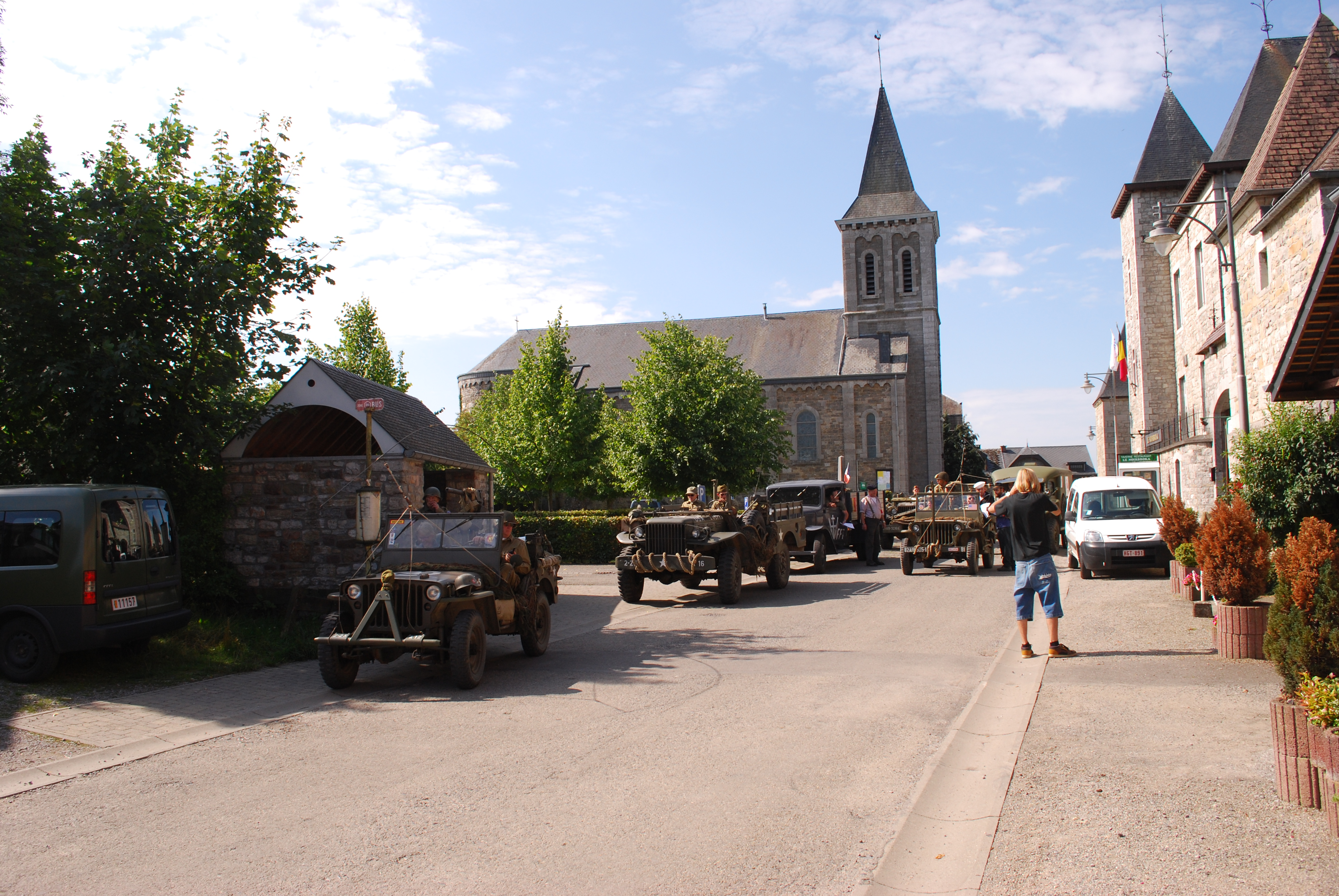
- The church and surrounding areas during an American military parade

- Location in Belgium
- Coordinates: 50°21′40″N 5°34′45″E
- Country: Belgium
- Region: Wallonia
- Province: Luxembourg
- Municipality: Durbuy
- Postal code: 6941

Villers-Sainte-Gertrude (Walloon: Viyé-Sinte-Djetrou) is a village of Wallonia and a district of the municipality of Durbuy, located in the province of Luxembourg, Belgium. Villers-Sainte-Gertrude has been part of the province of Luxembourg only since 1839. Before that, it was part of the department of the Ourthe. The communities of Deux Rys and Roche à Frêne (detached from Harre) were attached to it in 1826. It was a fully-fledged municipality before the fusion of municipalities in 1977, and is now part of the Belgian town of Durbuy. The district consists of Grand-Bru and Villers-Sainte-Gertrude and of the localities Moulin des Roches, Hiva and Champs des Cognées.

The village, located on a ridge at the foot of which flows the Aisne, a small tributary of the Ourthe and the stream of Vieux-Fourneau is a resort frequented by tourists during the summer period.

== History ==
In 966, Villers was mentioned in a document in which the Emperor Otto I confirmed the possessions of the Abbey of Nivelles. The land of Villers had been divested by the count of Hainaut to the monastery founded by Gertrude of Nivelles. Pledged by the monastery of Nivelles at the end of the 16th century, the estate of Villers became the property of Val-Saint-Lambert Abbey to which it would belong until the 18th century.

From the 16th to the 18th century, Villers-Sainte-Gertrude participated in the metallurgical activity of the Land of Durbuy which was happening at that time.

== Figures ==
- J. Pondant. Enrolled in the French armies after the invasion of the Netherlands, he was in Bayonne (Pyrénées-Atlantiques, France) when Napoleon was gathering troops there in order to invade Portugal. Pondant would write a dozen letters addressed to the members of his family who stayed home. He expresses his pride at becoming a corporal but hinted at the atrocities carried out by the French soldiers back from Lisbon. This correspondence, kept in France by the descendants Brisbois, has been published.
