= Børge Andersen =

Børge Andersen may refer to:

- Børge Kaas Andersen (1937–2019), Danish rower
- Børge Andersen (chess player) (1934–1993), Danish chess player
