= Mogens Jensen =

Mogens Jensen is the name of:

- Mogens Frey Jensen, Danish cyclist
- Mogens Jensen (rower), Danish rower
- Mogens Jensen (politician), Danish politician
