= Franklin Zielski =

Canadian rower (1941–2021)

Personal information
- Born: 1 March 1941; Welland, Ontario, Canada
- Died: 27 April 2021 (aged 80)

Sport
- Sport: Rowing

Franklin Zielski (1 March 1941 – 27 April 2021) was a Canadian rower. He competed in the men's coxless four event at the 1960 Summer Olympics.
