= René Líbal =

Czech rower (born 1937)

Personal information
- Born: 15 July 1937 (age 88) Prague, Czechoslovakia
- Height: 178 cm (5 ft 10 in)
- Weight: 76 kg (168 lb)

Sport
- Sport: Rowing
Medal record
Men's rowing
Representing Czechoslovakia
European Rowing Championships
Bronze medal – third place	1958 Poznań	Coxless four
Bronze medal – third place	1959 Mâcon	Coxless four
Silver medal – second place	1963 Copenhagen	Coxed four

René Líbal (born 15 July 1937) is a Czech rower who represented Czechoslovakia. He competed at the 1960 Summer Olympics in Rome with the men's coxless four where they came fourth.
