= Ted Nash (rower) =

American rower (1932–2021)

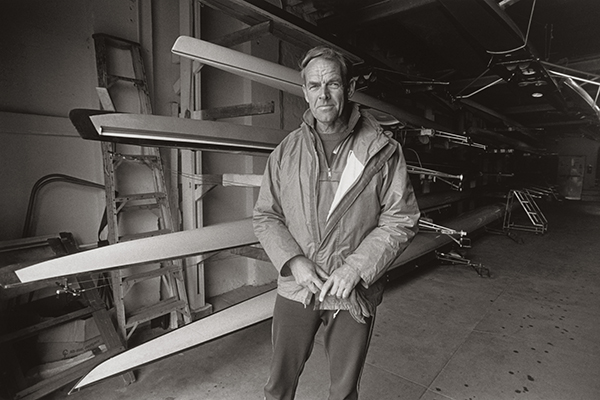
- Nash in 1991

Personal information
- Born: October 29, 1932 Melrose, Massachusetts, U.S.
- Died: July 3, 2021 (aged 88) Medford, New Jersey, U.S.
Medal record
Men's rowing
Representing the United States
Olympic Games
Gold medal – first place	1960 Rome	Coxless four
Bronze medal – third place	1964 Tokyo	Coxless four

Theodore Allison Nash II (October 29, 1932 – July 3, 2021) was an American competition rower and Olympic champion, rowing coach, and sports administrator. Nash participated, either as a coach or athlete, in eleven separate Olympic Games from 1960 to 2008.

In March 2023, Jennifer Fox named him as the real-life coach from her film The Tale, which detailed her sexual abuse as a child.

== Early life ==
He was born in Melrose, Massachusetts. Nash served as a pilot and first lieutenant in the Army Aviation division, teaching aviation and aerobatics. He was a member of the U.S. Marine Corps Reserve. While in the military, he was also an anti-guerrilla warfare instructor, an officer candidate school tactical officer for the Army and a member of the elite Green Beret, and special forces units for the Army. He was recalled four times on special friendly projects across the world.

Nash has served as both freshman and varsity coach for Penn and been a longtime supporter and icon of Penn AC.

== Rowing career ==
Nash won a gold medal in coxless fours at the 1960 Summer Olympics and a bronze for the same event at the 1964 Olympics. He also won gold medals at the 1959 and 1963 Pan American Games.

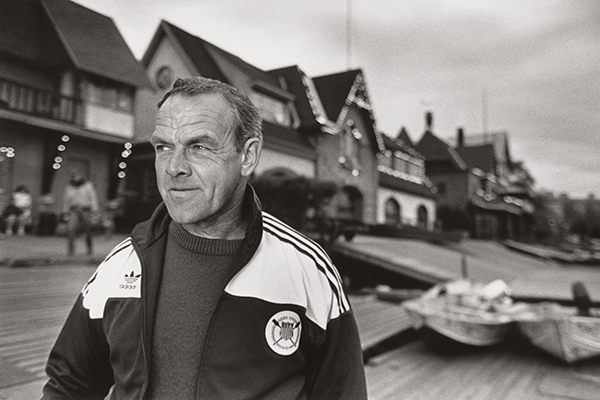
Rowing coach Ted Nash in 1991

== Coaching career ==
Nash coached at the University of Pennsylvania, first as freshman coach from 1965, then as head coach from 1969 to 1983. He was also a longtime supporter of Penn AC. Nash co-founded the National Women's Rowing Association and was the unofficial running coach at the Padukies Track Club in Philadelphia.

He also coached entrepreneurs Cameron and Tyler Winklevoss in the coxless pair at the 2008 Beijing Olympics.

== Personal life and sexual assault allegations ==
Nash died at the age of 88 on July 3, 2021, in Medford, New Jersey.

In 2023, the documentary filmmaker Jennifer Fox said that Nash had sexually abused her when she was 13 and he was 40. Nash was Fox's running instructor in 1973 when she was at horseback riding summer camp. Fox alleges that Nash forced her to perform oral sex multiple times. Fox also disclosed that in high school she wrote an essay detailing the abuse. She had previously told the story of her abuse, without revealing Nash's identity, in the 2018 film The Tale.

Nash's first wife Aldina Nash-Hampe described the accusation as a "surprise", but conceded that Nash "seemed to have affairs with a lot of women" and in 1972 she filed for a divorce after she found letters from Nash to other women. Jan Nash, his second wife, and Sean P. Colgan, one of Nash's former collegiate and national team rowers, described the accusations as uncharacteristic.

USRowing initiated an investigation into Ted Nash after being contacted by Jennifer Fox in 2022. The investigation was conducted by the law firm of Shearman & Sterling over a 16 month period. On April 30, 2024, USRowing released the investigation's 154 page report. In their statement, USRowing said, "Having reviewed the investigation's findings, USRowing believes there is compelling evidence supporting Ms. Fox's allegations of child sex abuse by Mr. Nash... In response to the findings of the investigation, we are rescinding all honors USRowing previously conferred upon Mr. Nash... Furthermore, we encourage all other organizations affiliated with Mr. Nash, and who may have granted him similar honors, to review the full report."
