= 1958 European Rowing Championships =

- Venue: Lake Malta
- Location: Poznań, Poland

The 1958 European Rowing Championships were rowing championships held on Lake Malta in the city of Poznań in Poland. Men competed in all seven Olympic boat classes (M1x, M2x, M2-, M2+, M4-, M4+, M8+), and women entered in five boat classes (W1x, W2x, W4x+, W4+, W8+).

== Medal summary – women's events ==
Event	Gold		Silver		Bronze	
Event	Country & rowers	Time	Country & rowers	Time	Country & rowers	Time
W1x	Hungary; Kornélia Pap		Austria; Eva Sika		West Germany; Ursula Vogt	
W2x	Soviet Union; Zossia Rakitskaya; Valentina Kalegina		Romania; Maria Laub; Florica Ghiuzelea		Czechoslovakia; Svetla Bartakova; Hana Musilova	
W4+	Soviet Union; Galina Gorelova; Ella Sergeyeva; Lidiya Risova; Valentina Terekhova; Viktoriya Dobrodeeva (cox)		Romania; Felicia Urziceanu; Rita Bonfert-Schob; Iuliana Toganel; Marta Kardos; Stefania Borisov (cox)		Hungary; Borbála Sebestyén; Zsuzsa Rakitay; Győzőné Lukachich; Ottoné Nagy; Antalné Benedek (cox)	
W4x+	Soviet Union; Alexandra Kulesova; Inna Lisany; Nina Yegorova; Svetlana Belyakova; Tamara Saretskaya (cox)		East Germany; Annemarie Otte; Helga Fischer; Ruth Harre; Brigitte Raue; Karla Fischer (cox)		Hungary; Istvánné Granek; Józsefné Raskó; Lászlóné Terelmes; Jánosné Kőszegi; Rudolfné Radványi (cox)	
W8+	Soviet Union; Irina Kamenkova; Vera Rebrova; Sinayda Abramkina; Nadezhda Gontsarova; Nina Korobkova; Lidiya Zontova; Zinaida Korotova; Galina Gorelova; Viktoriya Dobrodeeva (cox)		East Germany; Anita Blankenfeld; Ingeborg Peter; Ingeborg Bassler; Waltraud Dinter; Christl Langner; Marianne Schulze; Hella Schulz; Marianne Falk; Ursula Wiek (cox)		Romania; Iuliana Toganel; Elsa Oxenfeld; Felicia Urziceanu; Viorica Udrescu; Sonia Balan; Rita Bonfert-Schob; Stela Georgescu; Marta Kardos; Stefania Borisov (cox)	

== Medal summary – men's events ==
Event	Gold		Silver		Bronze	
Event	Country & rowers	Time	Country & rowers	Time	Country & rowers	Time
M1x	Australia; Stuart Mackenzie		West Germany; Klaus von Fersen		Soviet Union; Vyacheslav Ivanov	
M2x	Soviet Union; Aleksandr Berkutov; Yuriy Tyukalov		France; René Duhamel; Bernard Monnereau		West Germany; Thomas Schneider; Friedrich-Wilhelm Sidow	
M2-	Finland; Veli Lehtelä; Toimi Pitkänen		West Germany; Gerd Cintl; Horst Effertz		Romania; Stefan Kureska; Carol Vereș	
M2+	West Germany; Klaus Riekemann; Hans-Joachim Berendes; Hans-Dieter Maier (cox)		Italy; Renzo Ostino; Giovanni Anselmi; Vincenzo Bruno (cox)		Switzerland; Gottfried Kottmann; Rolf Streuli; Werner Ehrensperger (cox)	
M4-	West Germany; Hans Lenk; Manfred Rulffs; Kraft Schepke; Karl-Heinz Hopp		Romania; Stefan Kureska; Gheorghe Riffelt; Iuliu Sehovitz; Carol Vereș		Czechoslovakia; Ludek Musil; René Líbal; Miroslav Jíška; Jindřich Blažek	
M4+	West Germany; Georg Niermann; Friedrich Arfmann; Heinz-Werner Kollmann; Albrecht Wehselau; Gerd Jürgenbehring (cox)		Romania; Ion Boicu; Carol Kiss; Ion Bulugioiu; Tudor Bompa; Stefan Lupu (cox)		Yugoslavia; Nikola Cupin; Antun Ivankovic; Zseljko Plascar; Branko Vuletic; Antun Butkovic (cox)	
M8+	Italy; Romano Sgheiz; Alberto Winkler; Attilio Cantoni; Fulvio Balatti; Ellero Borgnolo; Giampiero Gilardi; Giovanni Zucchi; Giuseppe Moioli; Ivo Stefanoni (cox)		United States; John Kelly; Bill Knecht; George Herman; Paul Ignas; George Coleman; Gerald Heffernan; Harry Halloran; David Wilmerding; Allen Rosenberg (cox)		Soviet Union; Boris Fyodorov; Georgy Gushchenko; Yury Popov; Georgiy Bryulgart; Yaroslav Cherstvy; Anatoly Antonov; Yury Rogozov; Oleg Vasiliev; Yuri Polyakov (cox)	
