= Giancarlo Crosta =

Italian rower (1934–2024)

Personal information
- Born: 7 August 1934 Pianello del Lario, Italy
- Died: 23 September 2024 (aged 90) Pianello del Lario

Sport
- Sport: Rowing
Medal record
Men's rowing
Representing Italy
Olympic Games
Silver medal – second place	1960 Rome	Coxless four
European Rowing Championships
Gold medal – first place	1961 Prague	Coxless four

Giancarlo Crosta (7 August 1934 – 23 September 2024) was an Italian rower who competed in the 1960 Summer Olympics.

== Biography ==
Crosta was born in Pianello del Lario.

In 1960 he was a crew member of the Italian boat which won the silver medal in the coxless four event at the 1960 Summer Olympics. At the 1961 European Rowing Championships, he won gold with the coxless four in Prague.

Crosta died on 23 September 2024, at the age of 90.
