= John Sayre =

American rower (1936–2023)

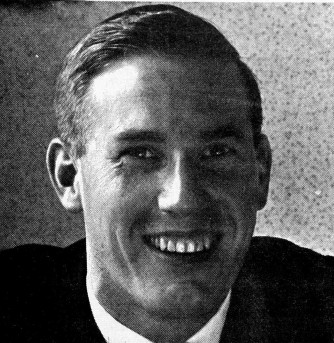
- Sayre in 1965

Personal information
- Born: April 1, 1936 Tacoma, Washington, U.S.
- Died: November 9, 2023 (aged 87)
Medal record
Men's rowing
Representing the United States
Olympic Games
Gold medal – first place	1960 Rome	Coxless four

John Sayre (April 1, 1936 – November 9, 2023) was an American competition rower and Olympic champion.

Born in Tacoma, Washington, Sayre won a gold medal in coxless fours at the 1960 Summer Olympics. He died November 9, 2023, at the age of 87.
