= Pekka Heinonen =

Finnish diver

Personal information
- Nationality: Finnish
- Born: 19 June 1940 Helsinki, Finland
- Died: 22 February 2017 (aged 76)

Sport
- Sport: Diving

Pekka Heinonen (19 June 1940 – 22 February 2017) was a Finnish diver. He competed in the men's 10 metre platform event at the 1960 Summer Olympics.
