= Henri Rouquet =

French diver

Personal information
- Nationality: French
- Born: 22 March 1942 (age 83) Bordeaux, France

Sport
- Sport: Diving

Henri Rouquet (born 22 March 1942) is a French diver. He competed in the men's 10 metre platform event at the 1960 Summer Olympics.
