= Giuseppe Galante =

Italian rower (1937–2021)

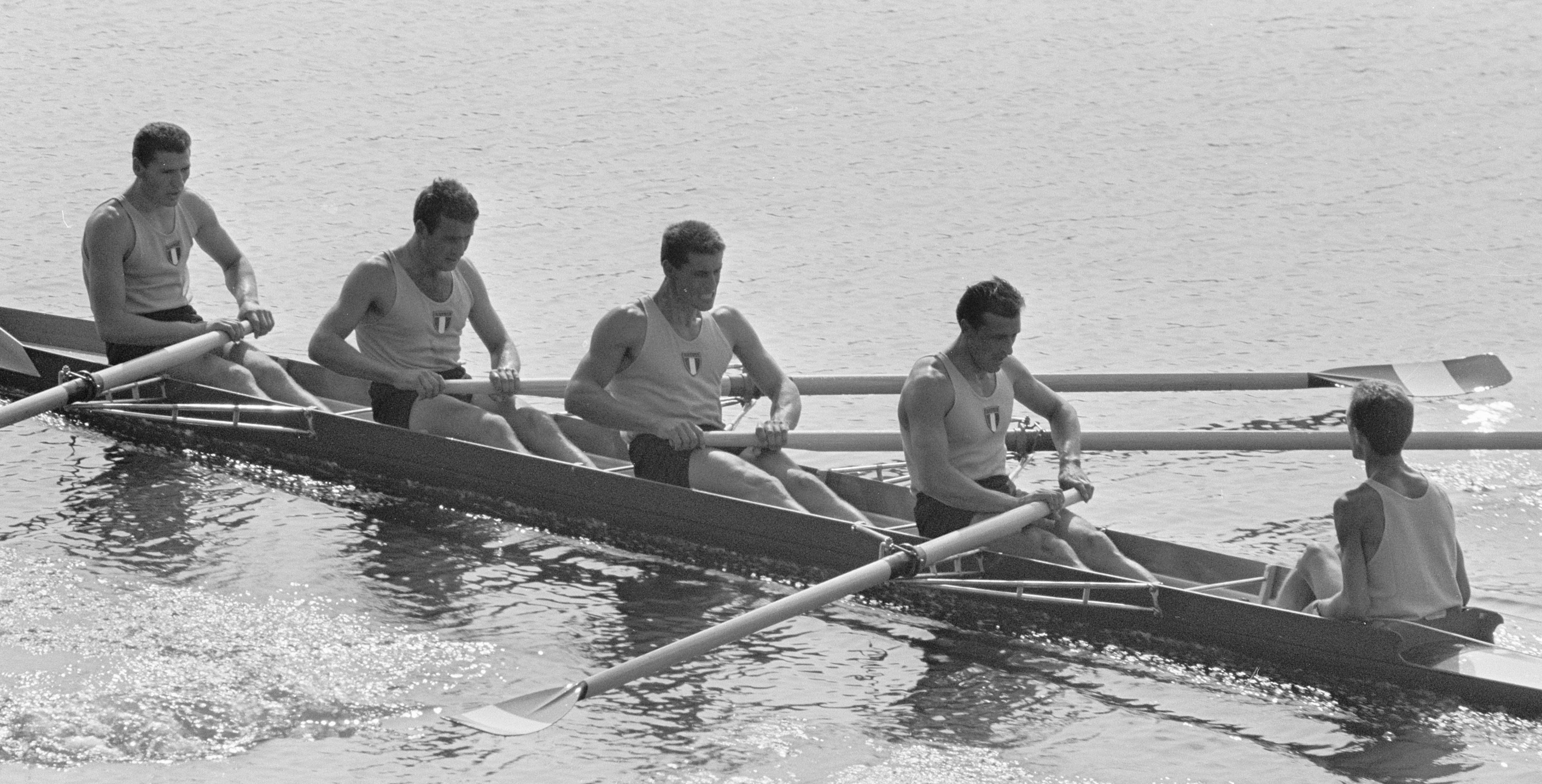
- Galante (second left) with the Italian coxed four at the 1964 European Championships

Personal information
- Born: 2 September 1937 Domaso, Italy
- Died: 20 December 2021 (aged 84) Domaso, Italy
- Height: 178 cm (5 ft 10 in)
- Weight: 75 kg (165 lb)

Sport
- Sport: Rowing
- Club: Canottieri Sampierdarenesi; Canottieri Falk Dongo
Medal record
Men's rowing
Representing Italy
Olympic Games
Silver medal – second place	1960 Rome	Coxless four
Silver medal – second place	1964 Tokyo	Coxed four
European Rowing Championships
Gold medal – first place	1961 Prague	Coxless four
Bronze medal – third place	1964 Amsterdam	Coxed four

Giuseppe Galante (2 September 1937 – 20 December 2021) was an Italian rower.

Galante was born in Domaso on 2 September 1937. He won a silver medal at the 1960 Summer Olympics and a European title in 1961 in the coxless four. He then changed to the coxed four and won a silver medal at the 1964 Summer Olympics and a bronze at the 1964 European Championships. His team finished fourth at the 1968 Games. Galante died on 20 December 2021, at the age of 84.
