= Anatoly Sysoyev =

Russian diver

Personal information
- Native name: Анатолий Сысоев
- Nationality: Russian
- Born: 12 June 1937 (age 87); Moscow, Russia

Sport
- Country: Soviet Union
- Sport: Diving

Anatoly Sysoyev (Russian: Анатолий Сысоев, also transliterated Anatoli Sysoev, born 12 June 1937) is a Russian former diver. He competed in the men's 10 metre platform event for the Soviet Union at the 1960 Summer Olympics.
