= Pertti Laine =

Finnish rower

Personal information
- Nationality: Finnish
- Born: 13 December 1938 Turku, Finland
- Died: 20 October 1999 (aged 60) Turku, Finland

Sport
- Sport: Rowing

Pertti Laine (13 December 1938 – 20 October 1999) was a Finnish rower. He competed in the men's coxless four event at the 1960 Summer Olympics.
