= Jindřich Blažek =

Czech rower

Personal information
- Born: 26 November 1933 Prague, Czechoslovakia
- Died: 30 June 1997 (aged 63)
- Height: 177 cm (5 ft 10 in)
- Weight: 78 kg (172 lb)

Sport
- Sport: Rowing
Medal record
Men's rowing
Representing Czechoslovakia
European Rowing Championships
Bronze medal – third place	1958 Poznań	Coxless four
Bronze medal – third place	1959 Mâcon	Coxless four

Jindřich Blažek (26 November 1933 – 30 June 1997) was a Czech rower who represented Czechoslovakia. He competed at the 1960 Summer Olympics in Rome with the men's coxless four where they came fourth. He died on 30 June 1997, at the age of 63.
