= Harre =

Harre or Harré is a surname. Notable people with the surname include:

- Horace Romano Harré (1927–2019), British philosopher and psychologist
- Alan Harre (1940–2020), the seventeenth president of Valparaiso University
- Laila Harré (born 1966), New Zealand politician
- Ruth Harre, German rower
