= Antonio Sbordone =

Italian diver (1932–2000)

Personal information
- Nationality: Italian
- Born: 16 June 1932; Naples, Italy
- Died: 5 December 2000 (aged 68)

Sport
- Sport: Diving

Antonio Sbordone (16 June 1932 – 5 December 2000) was an Italian diver. He competed in the men's 10 metre platform event at the 1960 Summer Olympics.
