= Miroslav Jíška =

Czech rower (born 1933)

Personal information
- Born: 4 October 1933 (age 92) Litoměřice, Czechoslovakia
- Height: 181 cm (5 ft 11 in)
- Weight: 84 kg (185 lb)

Sport
- Sport: Rowing
Medal record
Men's rowing
Representing Czechoslovakia
European Rowing Championships
Bronze medal – third place	1958 Poznań	Coxless four
Bronze medal – third place	1959 Mâcon	Coxless four

Miroslav Jíška (born 4 October 1933) is a Czech rower who represented Czechoslovakia. He competed at the 1960 Summer Olympics in Rome with the men's coxless four where they came fourth.
