= Kim Jelbart =

Australian rower (1937–2024)

Personal information
- Full name: James M Jelbart
- Nationality: Australian
- Born: 4 May 1937 Victoria, Australia
- Died: 10 April 2024 (aged 86)
- Education: University of Melbourne

Sport
- Sport: Rowing
- Club: MUBC

Achievements and titles
- National finals: King's Cup 1958

Kim Jelbart (4 May 1937 – 10 April 2024) was an Australian representative rower. He competed in the men's coxless four event at the 1960 Summer Olympics.

== Rowing pedigree ==
Jelbart's father Ron represented Victoria in the single scull in 1930 and later coached Australian crews. His uncle Peter and cousins Norman and Lloyd also rowed and they had teamed up with Ron in an MUBC crew which dominated Victorian fours racing in the late 1930s. Peter's son Kerry Jelbart (Kim's cousin) was also an Australian representative rower who enjoyed notable success.

Kim Jelbart rowed for Trinity College at Melbourne University and for the Melbourne University Boat Club. He was selected in the Victorian state representative men's senior eight which contested and won the King's Cup at the 1958 Interstate Regatta within the Australian Rowing Championships. In 1959 he stroked an MUBC eight to second place in the Victorian state championship.

== International representative rowing ==
For the 1960 Rome Olympics a Victorian coxless four was selected as the 7th and last priority boat and wholly on the basis of self-funding. Jelbart was instrumental in gathering a crew of Melbourne contenders who ultimately won through in selection trials. Peter Gillon was rowing at the Yarra Yarra Rowing Club but Jelbart had raced with him in varsity MUBC crews; Brian Vear was from the Banks Rowing Club but known to the Jelbarts; Peter Guest was new on the scene at MUBC but was a skillful rower. Ron Jelbart took on the role of coaching the four but he (like the coach of the coxed four) was not an official member of Australian squad. The lack of coaching support provided to the team by the Australian Olympic Federation proved to be an issue. The four placed 4th in their heat, then 4th in the repechage stage where they were eliminated. There was no B final so no overall placings.

== Death ==
Jelbart died on 10 April 2024, at the age of 86.
