= Paul Kölliker =

Swiss rower (1932–2021)

Personal information
- Nationality: Swiss
- Born: 19 February 1932; Wolfwil, Switzerland
- Died: 11 January 2021 (aged 88); Adligenswil, Switzerland

Sport
- Sport: Rowing

Paul Kölliker (19 February 1932 – 11 January 2021) was a Swiss rower. He competed in the men's coxless four event at the 1960 Summer Olympics.
