= Carol Vereș =

Romanian rower

Personal information
- Born: 12 April 1926 Arad, Romania
- Died: 20 February 2017 (aged 90)
- Height: 184 cm (6 ft 0 in)
- Weight: 77 kg (170 lb)

Sport
- Sport: Rowing
Medal record
Men's rowing
Representing Romania
World Rowing Championships
| Silver medal – second place | 1962 Lucerne | Coxed pair |
European Rowing Championships
| Silver medal – second place | 1958 Poznań | Coxless pair |

Carol Vereș (12 April 1926 – 20 February 2017) was a Romanian rower. He competed at the 1964 Summer Olympics in Tokyo with the men's coxless four where they came ninth.

He coached the Romanian National Team at the Munich Olympic Games in 1972.

He died on 20 February 2017.
