= Arto Nikulainen =

Finnish rower

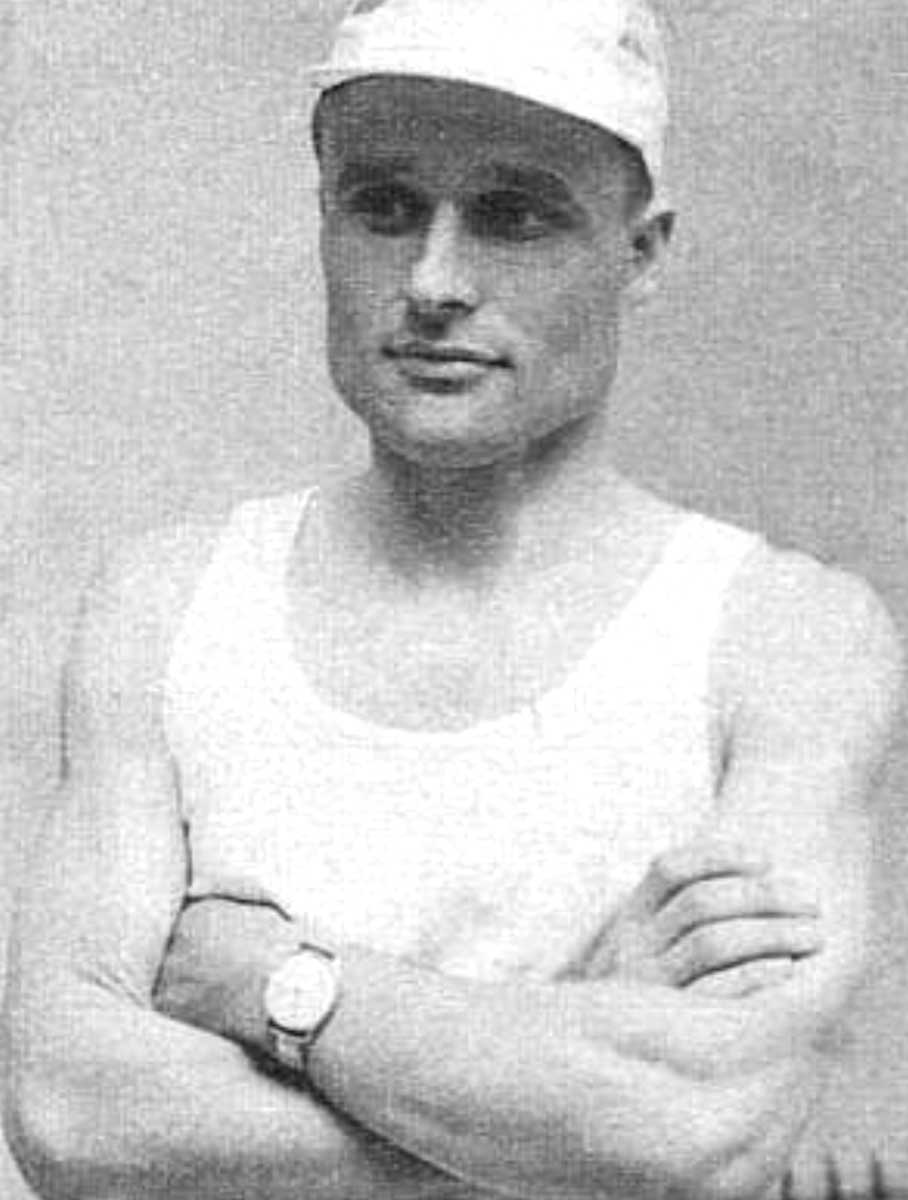

Personal information
- Nationality: Finnish
- Born: 28 August 1930; Piikkiö, Finland
- Died: 20 February 2010 (aged 79); Turku, Finland

Sport
- Sport: Rowing

Arto Nikulainen (28 August 1930 – 20 February 2010) was a Finnish rower. He competed in the men's coxless four event at the 1960 Summer Olympics.
