= Fritz Enskat =

German diver

Personal information
- Nationality: German
- Born: 1 January 1939; Neustadt an der Donau, Germany
- Died: 8 February 2023 (aged 84)

Sport
- Sport: Diving

Fritz Enskat (1 January 1939 – 8 February 2023) was a German diver. He competed in the men's 10 metre platform event at the 1960 Summer Olympics.
