= Victor Hendrix =

West German rower (1935–2020)

Personal information
- Born: 22 September 1935 Neuss, Germany
- Died: 16 April 2020 (aged 84)
- Height: 182 cm (6 ft 0 in)
- Weight: 80 kg (176 lb)

Sport
- Sport: Rowing
Medal record
Representing West Germany
European Rowing Championships
Silver medal – second place	1959 Mâcon	Coxless four

Victor Hendrix (22 September 1935 – 16 April 2020) was a West German rower who represented the United Team of Germany. He competed at the 1960 Summer Olympics in Rome with the men's coxless four where they were eliminated in the round one repechage.
