= Heikki Laine (rower) =

Finnish rower

Personal information
- Full name: Heikki Tapani Laine
- Nationality: Finnish
- Born: 16 June 1936 Turku, Finland
- Died: 7 May 2025 (aged 88) Turku, Finland

Sport
- Sport: Rowing

Heikki Tapani Laine (16 June 1936 – 7 May 2025) was a Finnish rower. He competed in the men's coxless four event at the 1960 Summer Olympics.

Laine died on 7 May 2025 in Turku, at the age of 88.
