= Albrecht Wehselau =

German rower

Personal information
- Born: 5 November 1937 (age 88) Bremen, Germany
- Height: 183 cm (6 ft 0 in)
- Weight: 88 kg (194 lb)

Sport
- Sport: Rowing
Medal record
Men's rowing
Representing West Germany
European Rowing Championships
Gold medal – first place	1958 Poznań	Coxed four

Albrecht Wehselau (born 5 November 1937) is a West German rower who represented the United Team of Germany. He competed at the 1960 Summer Olympics in Rome with the men's coxless four where they were eliminated in the round one repechage.
