= Georg Niermann =

West German rower (born 1937)

Personal information
- Born: 8 March 1937 (age 89) Bremen, Germany
- Height: 183 cm (6 ft 0 in)
- Weight: 83 kg (183 lb)

Sport
- Sport: Rowing
Medal record
Men's rowing
Representing West Germany
European Rowing Championships
Gold medal – first place	1958 Poznań	Coxed four

Georg Niermann (born 8 March 1937) is a West German rower who represented the United Team of Germany. He competed at the 1960 Summer Olympics in Rome with the men's coxless four where they were eliminated in the round one repêchage. In 1958 he was rewarded with the Silbernes Lorbeerblatt.
