= Hugo Christiansen =

Danish rower

Personal information
- Nationality: Danish
- Born: 5 July 1940 (age 84); Copenhagen, Denmark

Sport
- Sport: Rowing

Hugo Christiansen (born 5 July 1940) is a Danish rower. He competed in the men's coxless four event at the 1960 Summer Olympics.
