= Yury Rogozov =

Russian rower (born 1930)

Personal information
- Born: 8 September 1930

Sport
- Sport: Rowing
Medal record
Men's rowing
Representing the Soviet Union
European Rowing Championships
Silver medal – second place	1957 Duisburg	Eight
Bronze medal – third place	1958 Poznań	Eight

Yury Rogozov (Russian: Юрий Рогозов; born 8 September 1930) is a Russian rower who represented the Soviet Union. He competed at the 1952 Summer Olympics in Helsinki with the men's coxless four where they were eliminated in the semi-final repêchage.
