= Peter Guest =

Australian rower

Personal information
- Full name: Peter John Guest
- Nationality: Australian
- Born: 14 February 1938 (age 88) Victoria, Australia

Sport
- Sport: Rowing

Peter John Guest (born 14 February 1938) is an Australian former representative rower. He competed in the men's coxless four event at the 1960 Summer Olympics.

== Early rowing ==
Guest was educated at Wesley College in Melbourne where he took up rowing. He rowed in the Wesley senior eight in both of his senior years at the school - 1954 and 1955. He did not initially pursue rowing after school but after seeing the success which his younger brother Paul was having at the Melbourne University Boat Club, he again took up the sport and joined the MUBC.

Guest was selected as an emergency in 1960 for the Victorian men's senior eight which contested the King's Cup at the Interstate Regatta but he did not race.

His brother Paul also rowed at the 1960 Rome Olympics and went on to row at both Tokyo 1964 and Mexico City 1968.

== International representative rowing ==
For the 1960 Rome Olympics, a Victorian coxless four was selected as the 7th and last priority boat and wholly on the basis of self-funding. Guest was picked in the two seats of that crew with the others coming from various Melbourne clubs - Peter Gillon, Brian Vear and Kim Jelbart (albeit that Jelbart and Gillon rowed at varsity level at the MUBC). The lack of coaching support provided to the team by the Australian Olympic Federation proved to be an issue. The four was eliminated at the repechage stage and there was no B final.
