= Manfred Kluth =

German rower (born 1936)

Personal information
- Born: 2 July 1936 (age 90) Düsseldorf, Germany
- Height: 180 cm (5 ft 11 in)
- Weight: 77 kg (170 lb)

Sport
- Sport: Rowing
Medal record
Representing West Germany
European Rowing Championships
| Silver medal – second place | 1959 Mâcon | Coxless four |

Manfred Kluth (born 2 July 1936) is a West German rower who represented the United Team of Germany. He competed at the 1960 Summer Olympics in Rome with the men's coxless four where they were eliminated in the round one repêchage.
