= Fabio Paiella =

Italian diver (1939–2003)

Personal information
- Nationality: Italian
- Born: 25 April 1939; Rome, Italy
- Died: 4 March 2003 (aged 63)

Sport
- Sport: Diving

Fabio Paiella (25 April 1939 – 4 March 2003) was an Italian diver. He competed in the men's 10 metre platform event at the 1960 Summer Olympics.
