= Eero Laine (rower) =

Finnish rower (1933–2023)

Personal information
- Nationality: Finnish
- Born: 17 September 1933; Turku, Finland
- Died: 4 September 2023 (aged 89); Turku, Finland

Sport
- Sport: Rowing

Eero Laine (17 September 1933 – 4 September 2023) was a Finnish rower. He competed in the men's coxless four event at the 1960 Summer Olympics. Laine died in Turku on 4 September 2023, at the age of 89.
