= Igor Luzhkovsky =

Russian swimmer (1938–2000)

Personal information
- Born: 18 March 1938 Saint Petersburg, Russia
- Died: 14 September 2000 (aged 62)
- Height: 1.74 m (5 ft 9 in)
- Weight: 72 kg (159 lb)

Sport
- Sport: Swimming
- Club: Burevestnik Leningrad
Medal record
Representing Soviet Union
European Championships
Gold medal – first place	1958 Budapest	4×200 m freestyle
Universiade
Gold medal – first place	1959 Turin	100 m freestyle
Gold medal – first place	1959 Turin	400 m freestyle

Igor Georgiyevich Luzhkovsky (Russian: Игорь Георгиевич Лужковский; 18 March 1938 – 14 September 2000) was a Russian swimmer who won a gold medal in the 4 × 200 m freestyle relay at the 1958 European Aquatics Championships. He also competed at the 1960 Summer Olympics and finished fifth in the 4 × 100 m medley and eights in the 4 × 200 m freestyle relay. In 1959 he won two gold medals at the Summer Universiade and a national title in the 100 m freestyle, setting a new national record. Between 1958 and 1960 he also set three European records.

He graduated from the Lesgaft University of Physical Education in Saint Petersburg and married Marina Shamal, who also competed in swimming at the 1960 Olympics. He was a lieutenant colonel in the Soviet Army.
