= Rolf Streuli =

Swiss rower (1931–1995)

Personal information
- Born: 13 July 1931 Zürich, Switzerland
- Died: 27 November 1995 (aged 64) Zürich, Switzerland
- Height: 188 cm (6 ft 2 in)
- Weight: 80 kg (176 lb)

Sport
- Sport: Rowing
Medal record
Men's rowing
Representing Switzerland
European Rowing Championships
Gold medal – first place	1954 Amsterdam	Coxed pair
Gold medal – first place	1955 Ghent	Coxed pair
Silver medal – second place	1956 Bled	Coxed pair
Bronze medal – third place	1957 Duisburg	Coxed four
Bronze medal – third place	1958 Poznań	Coxed pair
Gold medal – first place	1959 Mâcon	Coxless four

Rolf Streuli (13 July 1931 – 27 November 1995) was a Swiss rower. He competed at the 1960 Summer Olympics in Rome with the men's coxless four where they came sixth. Streuli died in Zürich on 27 November 1995, at the age of 64.
