= Valentin Morkovkin =

Russian rower (1933–1999)

Medal record

Men's rowing

Representing the Soviet Union

Olympic Games
Bronze medal – third place	1960 Rome	Coxless four

Valentin Ivanovich Morkovkin (Russian: Валентин Иванович Морковкин, 20 September 1933 – 1999) was a Russian rower who competed for the Soviet Union in the 1960 Summer Olympics.

He was born in Nizhny Novgorod.

In 1960 he was a crew member of the Soviet boat which won the bronze medal in the coxless fours event.
