= Iosif Varga (rower) =

Romanian rower

Personal information
- Nationality: Romanian
- Born: 6 September 1934 (age 92) Lorinti, Romania

Sport
- Sport: Rowing

Iosif Varga (born 6 September 1934) is a Romanian rower. He competed in the men's coxless four event at the 1960 Summer Olympics.
