= Urszula Augustyniak =

Polish historian and academic

Urszula Augustyniak (born 1950) is a Polish historian and academic, who specializes in cultural history of the early modern period.

She graduated in history from the University of Warsaw in 1973. She holds a PhD (1979) and habilitation (1988) from the same university. She has been full professor since 2000. Urszula Augustyniak is a member of editorial board of "Odrodzenie i Reformacja w Polsce".

She has written extensively about the functioning of the Polish-Lithuanian royal court, customs of the nobility, clientelism, relations between the clergy and the secular estate, religious differences in the early modern period, Baroque art and the ways of disseminating information in the Polish-Lithuanian Commonwealth.

== Books ==
- Informacja i propaganda w Polsce za Zygmunta III (1981)
- Koncepcje narodu i społeczeństwa w literaturze plebejskiej od końca XVI do końca XVII wieku (1989)
- Testamenty ewangelików reformowanych w Wielkim Księstwie Litewskim (1992) (second edition published in 2014)
- Skarb litewski za pierwszych dwu Wazów : 1587-1648 (1994)
- Wazowie i "królowie rodacy" : studium władzy królewskiej w Rzeczypospolitej XVII wieku (1999)
- Dwór i klientela Krzysztofa Radziwiłła (1585-1640) : mechanizmy patronatu (2001)
- W służbie hetmana i Rzeczypospolitej : klientela wojskowa Krzysztofa Radziwiłła (1585-1640) (2004)
- Historia Polski 1572-1795 (2008)
- Państwo świeckie czy księże? Spór o rolę duchowieństwa katolickiego w Rzeczypospolitej w czasach Zygmunta III Wazy. Wybór tekstów (2012)
- History of the Polish-Lithuanian Commonwealth: State - Society - Culture - Editorial work by Iwo Hryniewicz - Translated by Grażyna Waluga and Dorota Sobstel (2015)
