= John Candler (diver) =

British diver

Personal information
- Nationality: British
- Born: 13 December 1939 (age 86) Scarborough, England

Sport
- Sport: Diving

John Candler (born 13 December 1939) is a British diver. He competed at the 1960 Summer Olympics and the 1964 Summer Olympics.
