= Igor Akhremchik =

Soviet rower (1933–1990)

Personal information
- Born: 18 October 1933 Leningrad, Soviet Union
- Died: 5 January 1990 (aged 56)

Sport
- Sport: Rowing
Medal record
Men's rowing
Representing the Soviet Union
Olympic Games
Bronze medal – third place	1960 Rome	Coxless four
European Rowing Championships
Silver medal – second place	1961 Prague	Coxless four

Igor Vladimirovich Akhremchik (Russian: Игорь Владимирович Ахремчик, 18 October 1933 – 5 January 1990) was a Russian rower who competed for the Soviet Union in the 1960 Summer Olympics.

He was born in Leningrad.

At the 1960 Summer Olympics, he was a crew member of the Soviet boat that won the bronze medal in the coxless four event. At the 1961 European Rowing Championships, he won silver with the coxless four in Prague.
