= Antoni Rosołowicz =

Polish rower

Personal information
- Born: 13 July 1933 (age 92) Wilno, Poland
- Height: 186 cm (6 ft 1 in)
- Weight: 81 kg (179 lb)

Sport
- Country: Poland
- Sport: Rowing

Antoni Rosołowicz (born 13 July 1933) is a Polish rower. He competed in the men's coxless four event at the 1960 Summer Olympics.
