= Marina Shamal =

Russian swimmer

Personal information
- Born: 9 April 1939 (age 85); Moscow, Russian SFSR, Soviet Union
- Height: 1.70 m (5 ft 7 in)
- Weight: 63 kg (139 lb)

Sport
- Sport: Swimming
- Club: Dynamo Moscow

Marina Yakubovna Shamal (Russian: Марина Якубовна Шамаль; born 9 April 1939) is a retired Russian swimmer. She competed at the 1960 Summer Olympics and finished eights in the 4×100 m freestyle and medley relays. She was a national champion in the 100 m freestyle (1962, 1963), 4×100 m freestyle (1955) and 4×100 m medley events (1956).

She married Igor Luzhkovsky, who also competed at the 1960 Olympics in swimming, and changed her last name to Luzhkovskaya (Russian: Лужковская). After retiring from competitions she worked as a coach in swimming and synchronized swimming.
