= Kazimierz Neumann =

Polish rower

Personal information
- Nationality: Polish
- Born: 23 November 1933; Toruń, Poland
- Died: 16 July 2011 (aged 77); Bydgoszcz, Poland

Sport
- Sport: Rowing

Kazimierz Neumann (23 November 1933 – 16 July 2011) was a Polish rower. He competed in the men's coxless four event at the 1960 Summer Olympics.
