= Ruth Harre =

German rower

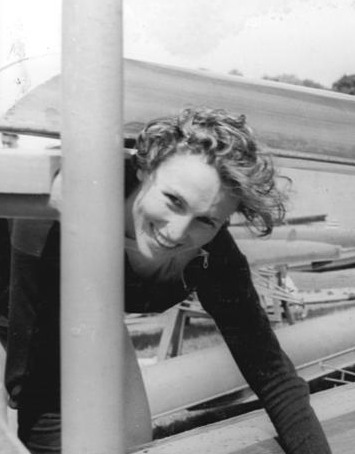
- Ruth Harre in 1957

Sport
- Sport: Rowing
Medal record
Women's rowing
Representing East Germany
European Rowing Championships
Bronze medal – third place	1957 Duisburg	Quad sculls
Silver medal – second place	1958 Poznań	Quad sculls

Ruth Harre is a retired German rower who won a bronze and a silver medal in the quad sculls at the European championships of 1957 and 1958, respectively.
