= Yury Melikhov =

Russian cyclist

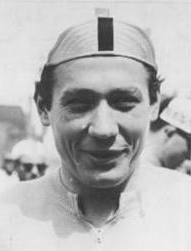
- Yury Melikhov in 1961

Personal information
- Born: 1 April 1937 Leningrad, Russian SFSR, Soviet Union
- Died: February 2000 (aged 62)
- Height: 1.75 m (5 ft 9 in)
- Weight: 76 kg (168 lb)

Sport
- Sport: Cycling
- Club: VS Leningrad
Medal record
Representing the Soviet Union
Olympic Games
Bronze medal – third place	1960 Rome	Team time trial
World championships
Bronze medal – third place	1963 Rocourt	Team time trial

Yury Afanasyevich Melikhov (Russian: Юрий Афанасьевич Мелихов; 1 April 1937 – February 2000) was a Russian cyclist. He competed in the road race and 100 km team time trial at the 1960 and 1964 Summer Olympics. In 1960 he finished in fourth place on the road and won a bronze medal in the time trial. In 1964 he finished in 60th and 5th place respectively.

He won a bronze medal in the team time trial at the world championship in 1963 and six national titles in road race disciplines in 1958–1963. He took part in the Peace Race in 1959, 1961, 1962 and 1965, winning them all in the team competition. In 1959, he won one stage and finished in seventh place individually. In 1961, he won four stages and the overall race. In 1962, with no single stage win he managed to finishing second overall. In 1965 he won two stages, but ended in a disappointing 45th place.

After retirement from competitions he coached cycling teams in Saint Petersburg and in East Germany.
