= Børge Kaas Andersen =

Danish rower (1937–2019)

Personal information
- Nationality: Danish
- Born: 26 April 1937 Copenhagen, Denmark
- Died: 16 December 2019 (aged 82)

Sport
- Sport: Rowing

Børge Kaas Andersen (26 April 1937 – 16 December 2019) was a Danish rower. He competed in the men's coxless four event at the 1960 Summer Olympics. He served for some time as the chairman of the umpiring commission of the International Rowing Federation (FISA).
