= Mogens Jensen (rower) =

Danish rower

Personal information
- Nationality: Danish
- Born: 20 May 1937 (age 87); Copenhagen, Denmark

Sport
- Sport: Rowing

Mogens Jensen (born 20 May 1937) is a Danish rower. He competed in the men's coxless four event at the 1960 Summer Olympics.
