= Lajos Kiss (rower) =

Hungarian rower

Personal information
- Nationality: Hungarian
- Born: 6 June 1940 Budapest, Hungary
- Died: 21 January 2009 (aged 68) Budapest, Hungary

Sport
- Sport: Rowing

Lajos Kiss (6 June 1940 – 21 January 2009) was a Hungarian rower. He competed in the men's coxless four event at the 1960 Summer Olympics.
