= Yuriy Bachurov =

Russian rower

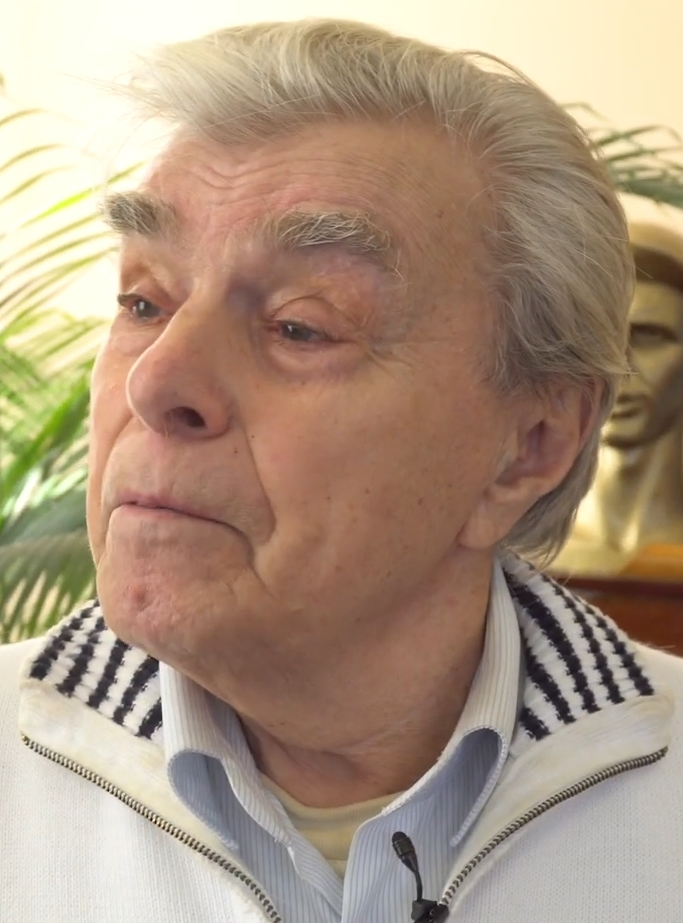
- Yuriy Bachurov in November 2019

Personal information
- Born: Yuriy Kuzmich Bachurov; 14 October 1933 (age 93) Ivanovo, Russian SFSR, Soviet Union

Sport
- Sport: Rowing
Medal record
Men's rowing
Representing the Soviet Union
Olympic Games
Bronze medal – third place	1960 Rome	Coxless four

Yuriy Kuzmich Bachurov (Russian: Юрий Кузьмич Бачуров, born 14 October 1933) is a Russian rower who competed for the Soviet Union in the 1960 Summer Olympics.

He was born in Ivanovo.

In 1960 he was a crew member of the Soviet boat which won the bronze medal in the coxless fours event.
