= Zinaida Belovetskaya =

Russian swimmer

Personal information
- Nationality: Russian
- Born: 10 November 1939 Severodvinsk, Soviet Union
- Died: 26 November 2011 (aged 72)

Sport
- Sport: Swimming

Zinaida Belovetskaya (10 November 1939 – 26 November 2011) was a Russian butterfly swimmer. She competed in two events at the 1960 Summer Olympics for the Soviet Union.
