= Roberto Madrigal =

Mexican diver

Personal information
- Full name: Roberto Madrigal García
- Born: 20 April 1941 (age 84) Mexico City, Mexico

Sport
- Sport: Diving

Roberto Madrigal García (Note: In this Spanish name, the first or paternal surname is Madrigal and the second or maternal family name is García.) (born 20 April 1941) is a Mexican diver. He competed at the 1960 Summer Olympics and the 1964 Summer Olympics.
