= Lyudmila Korobova =

Russian swimmer

Personal information
- Nationality: Russian
- Born: 15 May 1942 (age 84) Chelyabinsk, Soviet Union

Sport
- Sport: Swimming

Lyudmila Korobova (born 15 May 1942) is a Russian former swimmer. She competed in two events at the 1960 Summer Olympics for the Soviet Union.
