= Brian Vear =

Australian rower

Personal information
- Born: 16 November 1937
- Died: 18 February 2008 (aged 70)
- Height: 6 ft 0.5 in (184 cm)
- Weight: 174 lb (79 kg)

Sport
- Club: Banks Rowing Club

Achievements and titles
- National finals: King's Cup 1963-65

Brian Vear (16 November 1937 (Note: The Banks Rowing Club obituary has a date of birth of 25 January 1937, Sports-reference has 16 November 1937) - 18 February 2008) was an Australian representative rower who competed at two Olympic Games. In later life he was a tireless organiser and convenor of regattas at state, national and international levels.

== Club and state rowing ==
Vear was educated at St Patrick's College, Ballarat where he took up rowing. He was a member of that school's first IV when they won the Ballarat Public Schools' Head of the Lake race in 1955. In Melbourne, Vear's senior club rowing was from the Banks Rowing Club where he was a member and President from 1996 to 2006.

Vear first made state selection for Victoria in the 1963 men's eight which contested and won the King's Cup at the Australian Interstate Regatta. He also rowed in the victorious 1964 Victorian King's Cup eight and again in 1965 when they placed second.

== International representative rowing ==
For the 1960 Rome Olympics a Victorian coxless four was selected as the 7th and last priority boat and on the basis of self-funding. Vear was picked in the bow seat of that crew with the others coming from various Melbourne clubs - Peter Guest, Peter Gillon and Kim Jelbart. The lack of coaching support provided to the team by the Australian Olympic Federation proved to be an issue. The four was eliminated at the repechage stage and there was no B final.

For the 1964 Tokyo Olympics that year's winning Victorian King's Cup eight was selected in toto as the Australian men's eight. They took a new Sargent & Burton racing shell to the Olympics but quickly saw that its design and technology was way behind the European built Donoratico and Stampfli shells used by the other nations. With Vear in the bow seat they raced in a borrowed Donoratico boat for the B final and rowed to an overall eighth place in the Olympic regatta.

== Championships convenor ==
Vear had a role as the Victorian team manager for the interstate regatta in 1997 and from 2000 onward began to play a leading role in the organisation of the Australian Rowing Championships and of Master Regattas at an International level. He was Chairman of the Organising Committee for the Australian Rowing Championships in 2002, 2004 and 2007. He was President of the Australian Masters Committee for a period from 2001 and Chairman of the Organising Committee for the 2003 World Masters Games.
