= Robert Adams (rower) =

Canadian rower

Personal information
- Born: 26 October 1942 (age 84) St. Catharines, Ontario, Canada
- Height: 1.88 m (6 ft 2 in)
- Weight: 85 kg (187 lb)

Sport
- Sport: Rowing

Robert P. Adams (born 26 October 1942) is a Canadian rower. He competed in the 1960 Summer Olympics.
