= Peter Gillon =

Australian rower (1939–2018)

Personal information
- Born: 11 August 1939
- Died: 6 December 2018 (aged 79)
- Education: Xavier College, Melbourne

Sport
- Club: Yarra Yarra Rowing Club; Mercantile Rowing Club

Achievements and titles
- National finals: King's Cup 1965

Peter Gillon (11 August 1939 – 6 December 2018) was an Australian representative rower who competed at two Olympic Games. He competed at the 1960 Rome and 1964 Tokyo Olympics in the men's coxless four.

== Club and state rowing ==
Gillon was educated at Xavier College, Melbourne where he took up rowing. His senior club rowing was from the Yarra Yarra Rowing Club and later the Mercantile Rowing Club in Melbourne.

The strength of Victorian rowing in the early 1960s was such that Gillon had already rowed at two Olympic Games before he was able to earn a seat in the Victorian state representative men's senior eight contesting the King's Cup at the Interstate Regattas within the Australian Rowing Championships. That selection came in 1965 when he rowed in the two seat of the Victorian eight to a second placing in the King's Cup behind NSW.

He contested national title events at Australian Rowing Championships first held in 1962 and thereafter every second year. He won silver in a coxed four at the 1962 Australian Championships and gold in Mercantile colours in a coxless four which he stroked in 1964.

== International representative rowing ==
For the 1960 Rome Olympics a Victorian coxless four was selected as the 7th and last priority boat and wholly on the basis of self-funding. Gillon was picked in the three seat of that crew with the others coming from various Melbourne clubs - Peter Guest, Brian Vear and Kim Jelbart. The lack of coaching support provided to the team by the Australian Olympic Federation proved to be an issue. The four was eliminated at the repechage stage and there was no B final.

For the 1964 Tokyo Olympics, the Australian 1964 national champion Mercantile coxless four was selected in-toto as Australia's coxless four entrants with Gillon at stroke. They placed 4th in their heat and 4th in the repechage, to be eliminated at that point, missing the B final and an overall regatta placing.

== Professional career ==
Peter Gillon later became a property developer in Melbourne, as managing director of Gillon Group.
