= Bogdan Poniatowski =

Polish rower

Personal information
- Born: 6 November 1931 Bydgoszcz, Poland
- Died: 24 April 2014 (aged 82)
- Height: 183 cm (6 ft 0 in)
- Weight: 82 kg (181 lb)

Sport
- Country: Poland
- Sport: Rowing

Bogdan Poniatowski (6 November 1931 – 24 April 2014) was a Polish rower. He competed in the Men's Coxless Fours event at the 1960 Summer Olympics in Rome, Italy.

Poniatowski died at the age of 82 on 24 April 2014.
