= Anatoly Tarabrin =

Soviet rower

Personal information
- Full name: Anatoly Petrovich Tarabrin
- Born: 28 June 1935 Smolensk, Soviet Union
- Died: 11 February 2008 (aged 72)
- Height: 184 cm (6 ft 0 in)
- Weight: 79 kg (174 lb)

Sport
- Sport: Rowing
Medal record
Men's rowing
Representing the Soviet Union
Olympic Games
Bronze medal – third place	1960 Rome	Coxless four
European Championships
Silver medal – second place	1961 Prague	Coxless four

Anatoly Petrovich Tarabrin (Russian: Анатолий Пётрович Тарабрин, 28 June 1935 – 11 February 2008) was a Russian rower who competed for the Soviet Union in the 1960 Summer Olympics.

He was born in Smolensk. He was a crew member of the 1960 Summer Olympics Soviet boat that won the bronze medal in the coxless four event. At the 1961 European Rowing Championships, he won silver with the coxless four in Prague. He died in Saint Petersburg, Russia, on 11 February 2008.
