= Benedykt Augustyniak =

Polish rower

Personal information
- Full name: Benedykt Stanisław Augustyniak
- Born: 1 March 1932 Poznań, Poland
- Died: 18 April 2017 (aged 85)
- Height: 185 cm (6 ft 1 in)
- Weight: 84 kg (185 lb)

Sport
- Country: Poland
- Sport: Rowing
- Club: KW 04 Poznań; Zawisza Bydgoszcz

Benedykt Stanisław Augustyniak (1 March 1932 – 18 April 2017) was a Polish rower. He competed in the men's coxless four event at the 1960 Summer Olympics.
