= Rowing at the 1960 Summer Olympics – Men's coxed pair =

Men's coxed pair at the Games of the XVII Olympiad
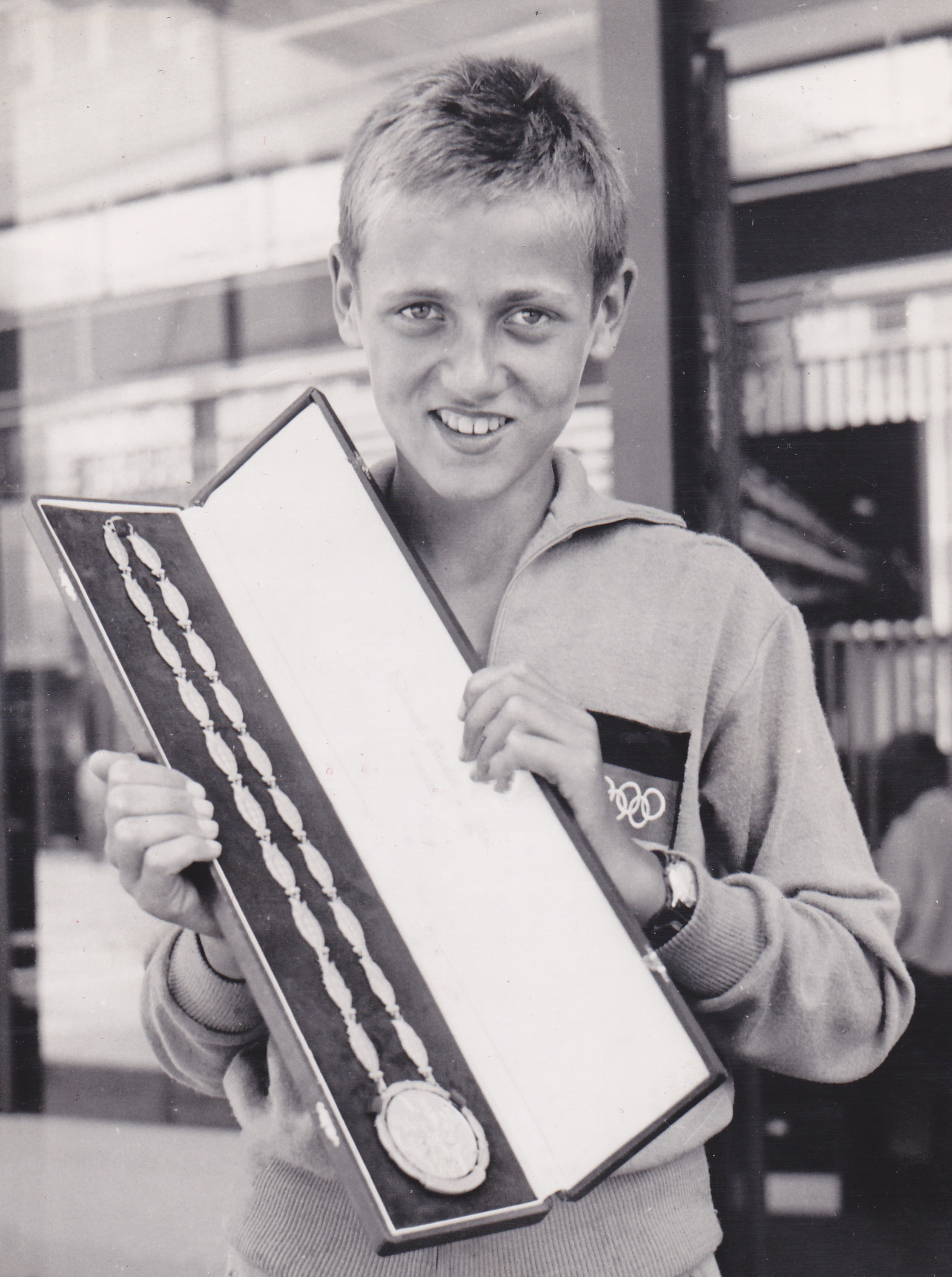
- Klaus Zerta, coxswain of the gold medal team
- Venue: Lake Albano,
- Dates: 31 August – 3 September 1960
- Competitors: 54 from 18 nations
- Winning time: 7:29.14

Medalists
| 1st place, gold medalist(s) | | Bernhard Knubel; Heinz Renneberg; Klaus Zerta; United Team of Germany |
| 2nd place, silver medalist(s) | | Antanas Bagdonavičius; Zigmas Jukna; Igor Rudakov; Soviet Union |
| 3rd place, bronze medalist(s) | | Richard Draeger; Conn Findlay; Kent Mitchell; United States |

The men's coxed pair competition at the 1960 Summer Olympics took place at took place at Lake Albano, Italy. It was held from 31 August to 3 September. There were 18 boats (54 competitors) from 18 nations, with each nation limited to a single boat in the event. The three nations on the podium were the same as those in 1956, though in a different order (and with only 1 of the 9 individual competitors being the same). The event was won by the United Team of Germany (bronze in 1956), with Bernhard Knubel and Heinz Renneberg rowing with Klaus Zerta the coxswain. Zerta is the youngest confirmed male gold medalist in Olympic history at 13 years and 283 days, just beating Hans Bourquin (also in the men's coxed pair, in 1928) by 9 days. The 1900 men's coxed pair gold-medal-winning coxswain may have been younger (estimates range from 7 to 12 years old), but the identities and ages of most coxswains in that event, including the gold medalist, are not known. The Soviet Union, bronze in 1956, took silver this time with Antanas Bagdonavičius, Zigmas Jukna, and Igor Rudakov. Defending champions the United States took bronze; Conn Findlay was the only man from the 1956 podium to return, this time with Richard Draeger as his rowing partner and Kent Mitchell the coxswain.

== Background ==
This was the 10th appearance of the event. Rowing had been on the programme in 1896 but was cancelled due to bad weather. The men's coxed pair was one of the original four events in 1900, but was not held in 1904, 1908, or 1912. It returned to the programme after World War I and was held every Games from 1924 to 1992, when it (along with the men's coxed four) was replaced with the men's lightweight double sculls and men's lightweight coxless four.

Only 1 of the 12 competitors from the 1956 coxed pair final returned: Conn Findlay from the gold-medal United States team. The United Team of Germany had been dominant the last few years other than their second-place finish to the Americans in the 1956 Games, winning four European championships with various crew compositions.

Czechoslovakia, Romania, Spain, and Uruguay each made their debut in the event. The United States made its eighth appearance, matching the absent France for most among nations to that point.

== Competition format ==
The coxed pair event featured three-person boats, with two rowers and a coxswain. It was a sweep rowing event, with the rowers each having one oar (and thus each rowing on one side). The course used the 2000 metres distance that became the Olympic standard in 1912 (with the exception of 1948).

This rowing competition consisted of two main rounds (heats and final), as well as a repechage round that allowed teams that did not win their heats to advance to the final.

- Semifinals: Three heats. With 18 boats entered, there were six boats per heat. The winner of each heat advanced directly to the final; all other boats went to the repechage.
- Repechage: Three heats. With 15 boats racing in but not winning their initial heats, there were five boats per repechage heat. The top boat in each repechage heat advanced to the final, with the remaining boats eliminated.
- Final: The final consisted of the six boats that had won either the preliminary heats or the repechage heats.

== Schedule ==
All times are Central European Time (UTC+1)

| Date | Time | Round |
|---|---|---|
| Wednesday, 31 August 1960 | 10:00 | Semifinals |
| Thursday, 1 September 1960 | 15:00 | Repechage |
| Saturday, 3 September 1960 | 16:30 | Final |

== Results ==
=== Semifinals ===
==== Heat 1 ====
| Rank | Rowers | Coxswain | Nation | Time | Notes |
|---|---|---|---|---|---|
| 1 | Antanas Bagdonavičius; Zigmas Jukna | Igor Rudakov | Soviet Union | 7:31.70 | Q |
| 2 | Richard Draeger; Conn Findlay | Kent Mitchell | United States | 7:39.50 | R |
| 3 | Václav Chalupa Sr.; Miroslav Strejček | František Staněk | Czechoslovakia | 7:47.60 | R |
| 4 | Paško Škarica; Ante Vrčić | Josip Bujas | Yugoslavia | 7:49.81 | R |
| 5 | Stewart Farquharson; Jeffrey Reeves | Ken Lester | Great Britain | 7:55.59 | R |
| 6 | Ioannis Khrysokhoou; Ioannis Simbonis | Ioannis Theodorakeas | Greece | 7:59.42 | R |

==== Heat 2 ====
| Rank | Rowers | Coxswain | Nation | Time | Notes |
|---|---|---|---|---|---|
| 1 | Ștefan Kurecska; Gheorghe Riffelt | Mircea Roger | Romania | 7:43.38 | Q |
| 2 | Maarten van Dis; Arnold Wientjes | Jan Just Bos | Netherlands | 7:48.01 | R |
| 3 | Gösta Eriksson; Lennart Hansson | Owe Lostad | Sweden | 7:56.06 | R |
| 4 | Osvaldo Cavagnaro; Mario Maire | Jorge Somlay | Argentina | 8:02.36 | R |
| 5 | Enrique Castelló; José Sahuquillo | Joaquín del Real | Spain | 8:06.44 | R |
| – | László Munteán; Pál Wágner | Gyula Lengyel | Hungary | DSQ | R |

==== Heat 3 ====
| Rank | Rowers | Coxswain | Nation | Time | Notes |
|---|---|---|---|---|---|
| 1 | Bernhard Knubel; Heinz Renneberg | Klaus Zerta | United Team of Germany | 7:31.64 | Q |
| 2 | Jens Berendt Jensen; Knud Nielsen | Sven Lysholt Hansen | Denmark | 7:36.04 | R |
| 3 | Luis Aguiar; Gustavo Pérez | Raúl Torrieri | Uruguay | 7:38.17 | R |
| 4 | Paul Guest; Walter Howell | Ian Johnston | Australia | 7:49.06 | R |
| 5 | Renzo Ostino; Giancarlo Piretta | Vincenzo Bruno | Italy | 8:09.20 | R |
| 6 | Roland Bollenberg; Edgard Luca | Étienne Pollet | Belgium | 8:14.40 | R |

=== Repechage ===
==== Repechage heat 1 ====
| Rank | Rowers | Coxswain | Nation | Time | Notes |
|---|---|---|---|---|---|
| 1 | Richard Draeger; Conn Findlay | Kent Mitchell | United States | 7:39.00 | Q |
| 2 | Luis Aguiar; Gustavo Pérez | Raúl Torrieri | Uruguay | 7:45.02 | |
| 3 | Osvaldo Cavagnaro; Mario Maire | Jorge Somlay | Argentina | 7:59.33 | |
| 4 | Enrique Castelló; José Sahuquillo | Joaquín del Real | Spain | 8:04.63 | |
| 5 | Roland Bollenberg; Edgard Luca | Étienne Pollet | Belgium | 8:18.29 | |

==== Repechage heat 2 ====
| Rank | Rowers | Coxswain | Nation | Time | Notes |
|---|---|---|---|---|---|
| 1 | Renzo Ostino; Giancarlo Piretta | Vincenzo Bruno | Italy | 7:39.52 | Q |
| 2 | Václav Chalupa Sr.; Miroslav Strejček | František Staněk | Czechoslovakia | 7:40.98 | |
| 3 | Maarten van Dis; Arnold Wientjes | Jan Just Bos | Netherlands | 7:42.15 | |
| 4 | Paul Guest; Walter Howell | Ian Johnston | Australia | 7:47.82 | |
| 5 | Ioannis Khrysokhoou; Ioannis Simbonis | Ioannis Theodorakeas | Greece | 7:54.75 | |

==== Repechage heat 3 ====
| Rank | Rowers | Coxswain | Nation | Time | Notes |
|---|---|---|---|---|---|
| 1 | Jens Berendt Jensen; Knud Nielsen | Sven Lysholt Hansen | Denmark | 7:39.70 | Q |
| 2 | Paško Škarica; Ante Vrčić | Josip Bujas | Yugoslavia | 7:48.05 | |
| 3 | Stewart Farquharson; Jeffrey Reeves | Ken Lester | Great Britain | 7:49.01 | |
| 4 | Gösta Eriksson; Lennart Hansson | Owe Lostad | Sweden | 7:50.77 | |
| 5 | László Munteán; Pál Wágner | Gyula Lengyel | Hungary | 8:01.35 | |

=== Final ===
| Rank | Rowers | Coxswain | Nation | Time |
|---|---|---|---|---|
| 1st place, gold medalist(s) | Bernhard Knubel; Heinz Renneberg | Klaus Zerta | United Team of Germany | 7:29.14 |
| 2nd place, silver medalist(s) | Antanas Bagdonavičius; Zigmas Jukna | Igor Rudakov | Soviet Union | 7:30.17 |
| 3rd place, bronze medalist(s) | Richard Draeger; Conn Findlay | Kent Mitchell | United States | 7:34.58 |
| 4 | Jens Berendt Jensen; Knud Nielsen | Sven Lysholt Hansen | Denmark | 7:39.20 |
| 5 | Renzo Ostino; Giancarlo Piretta | Vincenzo Bruno | Italy | 7:40.92 |
| 6 | Ștefan Kurecska; Gheorghe Riffelt | Mircea Roger | Romania | 7:49.57 |

== Results summary ==
| Rank | Rowers | Coxswain | Nation | Semifinals | Repechage | Final |
|---|---|---|---|---|---|---|
| 1st place, gold medalist(s) | Bernhard Knubel; Heinz Renneberg | Klaus Zerta | United Team of Germany | 7:31.64 | Bye | 7:29.14 |
| 2nd place, silver medalist(s) | Antanas Bagdonavičius; Zigmas Jukna | Igor Rudakov | Soviet Union | 7:31.70 | Bye | 7:30.17 |
| 3rd place, bronze medalist(s) | Richard Draeger; Conn Findlay | Kent Mitchell | United States | 7:39.50 | 7:39.00 | 7:34.58 |
| 4 | Jens Berendt Jensen; Knud Nielsen | Sven Lysholt Hansen | Denmark | 7:36.04 | 7:39.70 | 7:39.20 |
| 5 | Renzo Ostino; Giancarlo Piretta | Vincenzo Bruno | Italy | 8:09.20 | 7:39.52 | 7:40.92 |
| 6 | Ștefan Kurecska; Gheorghe Riffelt | Mircea Roger | Romania | 7:43.38 | Bye | 7:49.57 |
| 7 | Václav Chalupa Sr.; Miroslav Strejček | František Staněk | Czechoslovakia | 7:47.60 | 7:40.98 | Did not advance |
| 8 | Maarten van Dis; Arnold Wientjes | Jan Just Bos | Netherlands | 7:48.01 | 7:42.15 | Did not advance |
| 9 | Luis Aguiar; Gustavo Pérez | Raúl Torrieri | Uruguay | 7:38.17 | 7:45.02 | Did not advance |
| 10 | Paul Guest; Walter Howell | Ian Johnston | Australia | 7:49.06 | 7:47.82 | Did not advance |
| 11 | Paško Škarica; Ante Vrčić | Josip Bujas | Yugoslavia | 7:49.81 | 7:48.05 | Did not advance |
| 12 | Stewart Farquharson; Jeffrey Reeves | Ken Lester | Great Britain | 7:55.59 | 7:49.01 | Did not advance |
| 13 | Gösta Eriksson; Lennart Hansson | Owe Lostad | Sweden | 7:56.06 | 7:50.77 | Did not advance |
| 14 | Ioannis Khrysokhoou; Ioannis Simbonis | Ioannis Theodorakeas | Greece | 7:59.42 | 7:54.75 | Did not advance |
| 15 | Osvaldo Cavagnaro; Mario Maire | Jorge Somlay | Argentina | 8:02.36 | 7:59.33 | Did not advance |
| 16 | László Munteán; Pál Wágner | Gyula Lengyel | Hungary | DSQ | 8:01.35 | Did not advance |
| 17 | Enrique Castelló; José Sahuquillo | Joaquín del Real | Spain | 8:06.44 | 8:04.63 | Did not advance |
| 18 | Roland Bollenberg; Edgard Luca | Étienne Pollet | Belgium | 8:14.40 | 8:18.29 | Did not advance |
