= Rowing at the 1952 Summer Olympics – Men's coxless pair =

Men's coxless pairs at the Games of the XV Olympiad
- Date: 20–23 July 1952
- Competitors: 32 from 16 nations

Medalists
1st place, gold medalist(s)		Charlie Logg; Tom Price	United States
2nd place, silver medalist(s)		Michel Knuysen; Bob Baetens	Belgium
3rd place, bronze medalist(s)		Kurt Schmid; Hans Kalt	Switzerland

The men's coxless pairs competition at the 1952 Summer Olympics took place at Mei Bay, Helsinki, Finland.

== Schedule ==
Date	Round
20 July 1952	Heats
21 July 1952	Repechage
21 July 1952	Semifinal
22 July 1952	Semifinal repechage
23 July 1952	Final

== Results ==
=== Heats ===
First boat of each heat qualified to the semifinal, remainder goes to the repechage.

==== Heat 1 ====
Rank	Rowers	Country	Time	Notes
1	Kurt Schmid; Hans Kalt	Switzerland	7:46.0	Q
2	David Callender; Christopher Davidge	Great Britain	7:47.0	
3	Michel Knuysen; Bob Baetens	Belgium	7:48.9	
4	Charlie Logg; Tom Price	United States	7:50.7	

==== Heat 2 ====
Rank	Rowers	Country	Time	Notes
1	Don Palmer; Vic Middleton	Australia	8:06.4	Q
2	Bent Jensen; Palle Tillisch	Denmark	8:13.3	
3	Bruno Gamba; Antonio Saverio	Italy	9:21.2	
3	Jan Świątkowski; Stanisław Wieśniak	Poland	DQ	

==== Heat 3 ====
Rank	Rowers	Country	Time	Notes
1	Ben Binnendijk; Carl Kuntze	Netherlands	8:00.4	Q
2	Alberto Madero; Óscar Almirón	Argentina	8:02.2	
3	Klaus Hahn; Herbert Kesel	Saar	8:09.5	
3	Mikhail Plaksin; Vasily Bagretsov	Soviet Union	8:12.3	

==== Heat 4 ====
Rank	Rowers	Country	Time	Notes
1	Bernt Torberntsson; Evert Gunnarsson	Sweden	7:54.5	Q
2	Jean-Pierre Souche; René Guissart	France	7:57.9	
3	Heinz Renneberg; Heinz Eichholz	Germany	8:03.3	
4	Bengt Ahlström; Stig Winter	Finland	8:06.7	

=== Repechage ===
First boat of each heat qualified to the semifinal.

==== Heat 1 ====
Rank	Rowers	Country	Time	Notes
1	Michel Knuysen; Bob Baetens	Belgium	7:22.8	Q
2	Mikhail Plaksin; Vasily Bagretsov	Soviet Union	7:31.9	
3	Bruno Gamba; Antonio Saverio	Italy	7:43.4	
4	Bengt Ahlström; Stig Winter	Finland	7:47.9	

==== Heat 2 ====
Rank	Rowers	Country	Time	Notes
1	Charlie Logg; Tom Price	United States	7:28.4	Q
2	Jan Świątkowski; Stanisław Wieśniak	Poland	7:39.7	
3	Klaus Hahn; Herbert Kesel	Saar	DNF	

=== Semifinal ===
First boat of each heat qualified to the final, remainder goes to the repechage.

==== Heat 1 ====
Rank	Rowers	Country	Time	Notes
1	Kurt Schmid; Hans Kalt	Switzerland	7:37.7	Q
2	Don Palmer; Vic Middleton	Australia	7:46.8	
3	Jean-Pierre Souche; René Guissart	France	7:54.7	
4	Alberto Madero; Óscar Almirón	Argentina	7:59.8	

==== Heat 2 ====
Rank	Rowers	Country	Time	Notes
1	David Callender; Christopher Davidge	Great Britain	7:45.6	Q
2	Ben Binnendijk; Carl Kuntze	Netherlands	7:53.2	
3	Bernt Torberntsson; Evert Gunnarsson	Sweden	8:07.5	
4	Bent Jensen; Palle Tillisch	Denmark	8:15.7	

=== Semifinal repechage ===
First boat of each heat qualified to the final.

==== Heat 1 ====
Rank	Rowers	Country	Time	Notes
1	Charlie Logg; Tom Price	United States	7:36.2	Q
2	Bent Jensen; Palle Tillisch	Denmark	7:47.1	
3	Don Palmer; Vic Middleton	Australia	7:50.5	

==== Heat 2 ====
Rank	Rowers	Country	Time	Notes
1	Michel Knuysen; Bob Baetens	Belgium	7:35.0	Q
2	Alberto Madero; Óscar Almirón	Argentina	7:41.0	
3	Ben Binnendijk; Carl Kuntze	Netherlands	7:44.7	

==== Heat 3 ====
Rank	Rowers	Country	Time	Notes
1	Jean-Pierre Souche; René Guissart	France	7:57.1	Q
2	Bernt Torberntsson; Evert Gunnarsson	Sweden	7:58.6	

=== Final ===
Rank	Rowers	Country	Time	Notes
1st place, gold medalist(s)	Charlie Logg; Tom Price	United States	8:20.7	
2nd place, silver medalist(s)	Michel Knuysen; Bob Baetens	Belgium	8:23.5	
3rd place, bronze medalist(s)	Kurt Schmid; Hans Kalt	Switzerland	8:32.7	
4	David Callender; Christopher Davidge	Great Britain	8:37.4	
5	Jean-Pierre Souche; René Guissart	France	8:48.8	
