= Greece at the 1960 Summer Olympics =

- IOC code: GRE
- NOC: Committee of the Olympic Games

in Rome Italy
- Competitors: 48 in 8 sports
- Flag bearer: Crown Prince Constantine
- Medals Ranked 21st: Gold 1 Silver 0 Bronze 0 Total 1

Summer Olympics appearances (overview)
- 1896; 1900; 1904; 1908; 1912; 1920; 1924; 1928; 1932; 1936; 1948; 1952; 1956; 1960; 1964; 1968; 1972; 1976; 1980; 1984; 1988; 1992; 1996; 2000; 2004; 2008; 2012; 2016; 2020; 2024

Other related appearances
- 1906 Intercalated Games

Greece competed at the 1960 Summer Olympics in Rome, Italy. 48 competitors, all men, took part in 38 events in 8 sports. Greek athletes have competed in every Summer Olympic Games.

== Medalists ==
Medal	Name	Sport	Event	Date
Gold	Crown Prince Constantine; Odysseus Eskitzoglou; Georgios Zaïmis	Sailing	Dragon	September 7

== Rowing ==
Greece had six male rowers participate in two out of seven rowing events in 1960.

Men's coxed pair

- Ioannis Khrysokhoou
- Ioannis Simbonis
- Ioannis Theodorakeas (cox)

Men's coxed four

- Panagiotis Kalombratsos
- Ilias Polyzois
- Ioannis Simbonis
- Triantafyllos Tsongas
- Ioannis Theodorakeas (cox)

== Shooting ==
Seven shooters represented Greece in 1960.

25 m pistol

- Alkiviadis Papageorgopoulos
- Georgios Marmaridis

50 m pistol

- Dimitrios Kasoumis
- Georgios Marmaridis

50 m rifle, three positions

- Georgios Liveris
- Nikolaos Triantafyllopoulos

50 m rifle, prone

- Nikolaos Triantafyllopoulos
- Georgios Liveris

Trap

- Platon Georgitsis
- Georgios Pangalos

== Swimming ==
Men

Athlete	Event	Heat		Semifinal		Final	
Athlete	Event	Time	Rank	Time	Rank	Time	Rank
Dimitrios Kolovos	100 m backstroke	1:13.8	35	Did not advance			
Nikolaos Zakharopoulos	200 m breaststroke	2:56.4	36	Did not advance			
