= Don Palmer =

Don or Donald Palmer may refer to:

- Don Palmer (footballer) (born 1938), Australian rules footballer
- Don Palmer (rower) (1927–1980), Australian rower
- Donald Palmer, United States emeritus professor of philosophy
