= Uruguay at the 1960 Summer Olympics =

- IOC code: URU
- NOC: Uruguayan Olympic Committee

in Rome
- Competitors: 34 in 8 sports
- Medals: Gold 0 Silver 0 Bronze 0 Total 0

Summer Olympics appearances (overview)
- 1924; 1928; 1932; 1936; 1948; 1952; 1956; 1960; 1964; 1968; 1972; 1976; 1980; 1984; 1988; 1992; 1996; 2000; 2004; 2008; 2012; 2016; 2020; 2024

Uruguay competed at the 1960 Summer Olympics in Rome, Italy. 34 competitors, all men, took part in 15 events in 8 sports.

== Athletics ==
- Fermín Donazar

== Basketball ==
- Preliminary Round (Group D)

- Lost to Spain (72-77)
- Defeated Poland (76-72)
- Defeated Philippines (80-76)

- Semi Final Round (Group B)

- Lost to Soviet Union (53-89)
- Lost to United States (50-108)
- Lost to Yugoslavia (83-94)

- Classification Round

- Lost to Czechoslovakia (72-98)
- Lost to Poland (62-64) → 8th place

- Team Roster

- Carlos Blixen
- Danilo Coito
- Héctor Costa
- Nelson Chelle
- Manuel Gadea
- Adolfo Lubnicki
- Sergio Matto
- Raúl Mera
- Washington Poyet
- Waldemar Rial
- Milton Scaron
- Edison Ciavattone

== Boxing ==
- Gualberto Gutiérrez
- Roberto Martínez
- Pedro Votta

== Cycling ==
Five cyclists, all male, represented Uruguay in 1960.

Individual road race

- Rubén Etchebarne
- Rodolfo Rodino
- Juan José Timón
- Alberto Velázquez

1000m time trial

- Luis Serra

Team pursuit

- Alberto Velázquez
- Juan José Timón
- Rubén Etchebarne
- Rodolfo Rodino

== Equestrian ==
- Carlos Colombino
- Germán Mailhos
- Rafael Paullier

== Fencing ==
Two fencers represented Uruguay in 1960.

Men's foil

- Juan Paladino

Men's sabre

- Teodoro Goliardi
- Juan Paladino

== Rowing ==
Uruguay had five male rowers participate in two out of seven rowing events in 1960.

Men's double sculls

- Paulo Carvalho
- Mariano Caulín

Men's coxed pair

- Luis Aguiar
- Gustavo Pérez
- Raúl Torrieri (cox)

== Sailing ==
- Gonzalo García
- Horacio García
- Víctor Trinchin
