= List of flag bearers for Uruguay at the Olympics =

Uruguay at the Olympics
- IOC code: URU
- NOC: Uruguayan Olympic Committee
- Website: www.cou.org.uy (in Spanish)
- Medals: Gold 2 Silver 2 Bronze 6 Total 10

Summer appearances
- 1924; 1928; 1932; 1936; 1948; 1952; 1956; 1960; 1964; 1968; 1972; 1976; 1980; 1984; 1988; 1992; 1996; 2000; 2004; 2008; 2012; 2016; 2020; 2024

Winter appearances
- 1998; 2002–2022; 2026

This is a list of flag bearers who have represented Uruguay at the Olympics.

Flag bearers carry the national flag of their country at the opening ceremony of the Olympic Games.

#	Event year	Season	Flag bearer	Sport	References
1	1924	Summer			
2	1928	Summer			
3	1932	Summer	Guillermo Douglas	Rowing	
4	1936	Summer			
5	1948	Summer			
6	1952	Summer	Estrella Puente	Athletics	
7	1956	Summer	Héctor Costa	Basketball	
8	1960	Summer	Luis Aguiar	Rowing	
9	1964	Summer	Rubén Etchebarne	Cycling	
10	1968	Summer	Ana María Norbis	Swimming	
11	1972	Summer	Darwin Piñeyrúa	Athletics	
12	1976	Summer			
13	1984	Summer	Carlos Peinado	Basketball	
14	1988	Summer	Jesús Posse	Rowing	
15	1992	Summer	Ricardo Fabini	Sailing	
16	1996	Summer	Marcelo Filippini	Tennis	
17	1998	Winter	Gabriel Hottegindre	Skiing	
18	2000	Summer	Mónica Falcioni	Athletics	
19	2004	Summer	Serrana Fernández	Swimming	
20	2008	Summer	Alejandro Foglia	Sailing	
21	2012	Summer	Rodolfo Collazo	Rowing	
22	2016	Summer	Dolores Moreira	Sailing	
23	2020	Summer	Déborah Rodríguez	Athletics	
23	2020	Summer	Bruno Cetraro	Rowing	
24	2024	Summer	María Sara Grippoli	Taekwondo	
24	2024	Summer	Emiliano Lasa	Athletics	

== See also ==
- Uruguay at the Olympics
