= Heinz Renneberg =

West German rower

Olympic medal record

Men's rowing
Gold medal – first place	1960 Rome	Coxed pair

Karl Heinz Renneberg (29 January 1927 – 21 October 1999) was a West German rower who competed in the 1952 and 1960 Summer Olympics. He was born in Gelsenkirchen. In 1952 he and his partner Heinz Eichholz were eliminated in the first round repêchage of the Coxless pair event. Eight years later was a crew member of the boat starting for the United Team of Germany that won the gold medal in the coxed pair competition.
