= Van Dis =

van Dis is a Dutch surname. Notable people with the surname include:

- Adriaan van Dis (born 1946), Dutch author
- Leendert van Dis (born 1944), Dutch rower
- Maarten van Dis (born 1936), Dutch rower
