= Binnendijk =

Binnendijk may refer to:

== People ==
- Ben Binnendijk (1927-2020), Dutch rower
- Marlijn Binnendijk (born 1986), Dutch professional racing cyclist
- Simon Binnendijk (1821-1883), Dutch gardener and botanist

== Others ==
- SS Binnendijk, Dutch cargo steamship
