= Strejček =

Strejček (feminine Strejčková) is a Czech surname. Notable people with the surname include:

- Ivo Strejček (born 1962), Czech politician
- Jarmila Nygrýnová-Strejčková (1953–1999), Czech athlete
- Miroslav Strejček (1929–2000), Czech rower
