= Knud Nielsen =

Knud Nielsen may refer to:

- Knud Aage Nielsen (born 1937), Danish badminton player
- Knud Nielsen (rower) (1936–2011), Danish rower
