= Škarica =

Skarica is a surname. Notable people with the surname include:

- Paško Škarica (born 1934), Croatian rower
- Siniša Škarica (born 1949), Croatian music producer
- Toni Skarica (born 1954), Canadian politician of Bosnian descent
- Vjekoslav Škarica (1863–1945), Croatian and Yugoslavian politician and lawyer
