= René Guissart =

René Guissart may refer to:

- René Guissart (director), French cinematographer and film director
- René Guissart (rower), French rower at the 1956 Olympics
