= Bujas =

Bujas is a Croatian surname. Notable people with the surname include:

- Gašpar Bujas (1906–1963), Croatian poet and historian
- Josip Bujas (1930–1976), Croatian rower
- Leonardo Bujas (1904–1981), Croatian rower
- Ramiro Bujas (1879–1959), Croatian psychologist
- Šime Bujas (1927–2001), Croatian rower
- Zoran Bujas (1910–2004), Croatian psychologist
- Željko Bujas (1928–1999), Croatian linguist
