= Giancarlo Piretta =

Italian rower

Personal information
- Nationality: Italian
- Born: 20 March 1942 (age 83); Turin, Italy

Sport
- Sport: Rowing

Giancarlo Piretta (born 20 March 1942) is an Italian rower. He competed in the men's coxed pair event at the 1960 Summer Olympics.
