= Faxe =

Faxe Fakse
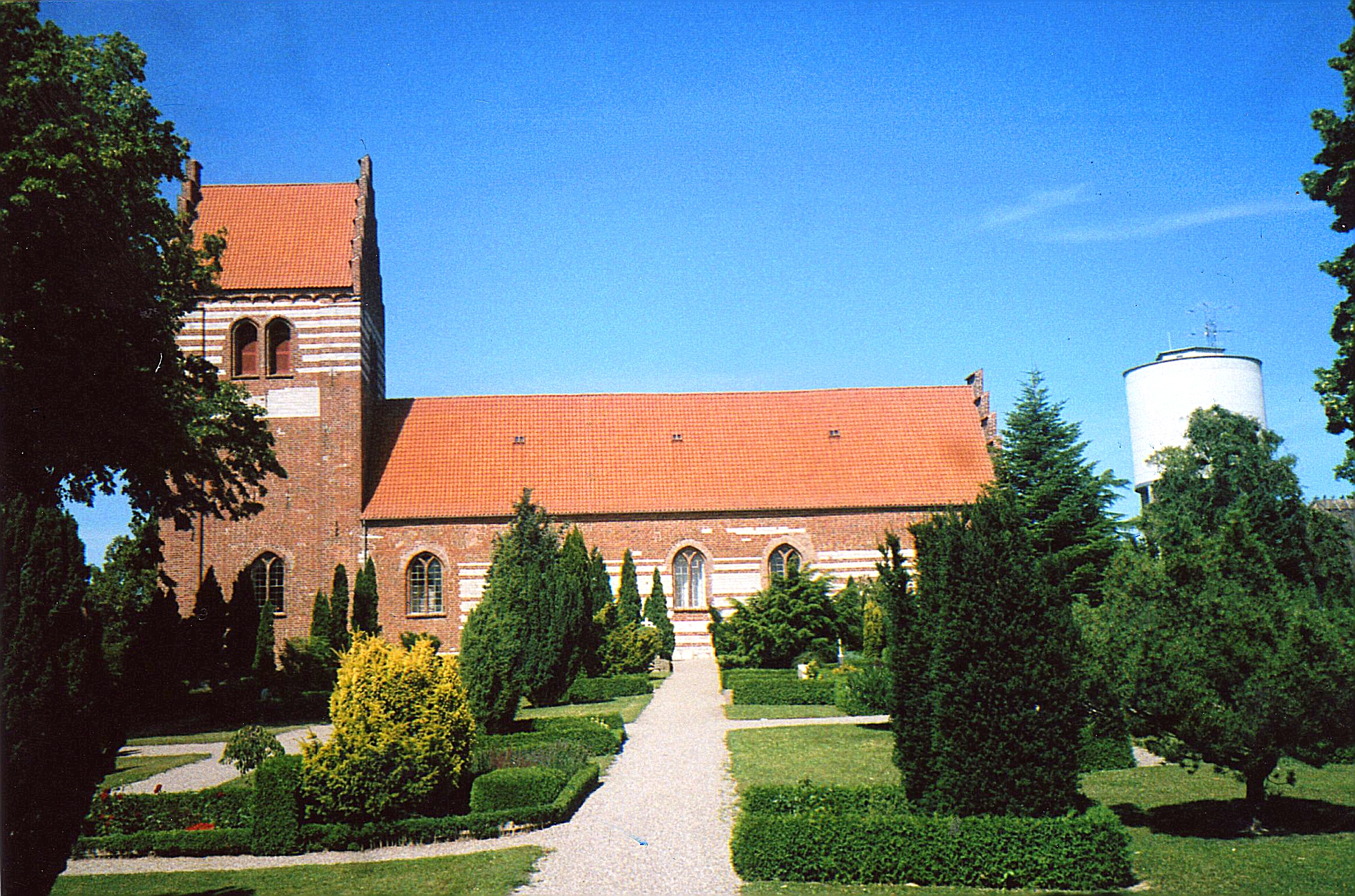
- Faxe Church in Faxe, Fakse

- Location in Denmark Faxe (Denmark Region Zealand)
- Coordinates: 55°15′19″N 12°07′10″E
- Country: Denmark
- Region: Region Sjælland
- Municipality: Faxe
- Current municipality: 2007-01-01

Area
  - Urban: 2.8 km^{2} (1.1 sq mi)
- Elevation: 8 m (26 ft)

Population (2026)
  - Urban: 4,204
  - Urban density: 1,500/km^{2} (3,900/sq mi)
  - Gender: 2,104 males and 2,100 females
- Time zone: UTC+1 (CET)
  - Summer (DST): UTC+1 (CEST)
- Postal code: DK-4640 Faxe
- Area code: (+45) 49

Faxe or Fakse is a town on the island of Zealand in eastern Denmark. It is located in Faxe Municipality in Region Zealand. The town is most known for the Faxe Brewery, Royal Unibrew, a relatively large brewery producing a range of beer and soft drinks, soda, energy drinks, Faxe Kondi and many more. On the edge of town lies a big limestone quarry (1 km^{2}), Faxe Quarry owned by Faxe Kalk. A Haribo Licorice ("Haribo Lakrids A/S") factory was also founded in Faxe in 1935.

== History ==
The name Faxe is Old Norse and means "horse mane", probably a reference to its location on a long hill. The town is mentioned in 1280. The first church was built in 1440.

For many years the letter x was considered unnatural in Danish and the Fakse spelling was enforced instead of the Old Norse Faxe. When hyphenated, the x still splits into ks (Fak-se).

A narrow gauge railway line between the Faxe Quarry and the harbor in Faxe Ladeplads opened in 1865. In 1879, the Østbanen railway line from Køge to Faxe opened. The two railway lines were connected in 1880. The quarry's narrow gauge railway was shut down many years ago, but one of the trains from the narrow gauge railway line is located in Faxe mini by as the only and the last train from the narrow gauge railway line.

== Landmarks ==
Faxe Church is from the late 15th century. The half-timbered Rasmus Svendsens Skole from 1633 is Denmark's oldest still existing village school. The Jomfruens Egede estate traces its history to 1346.

== Notable people ==
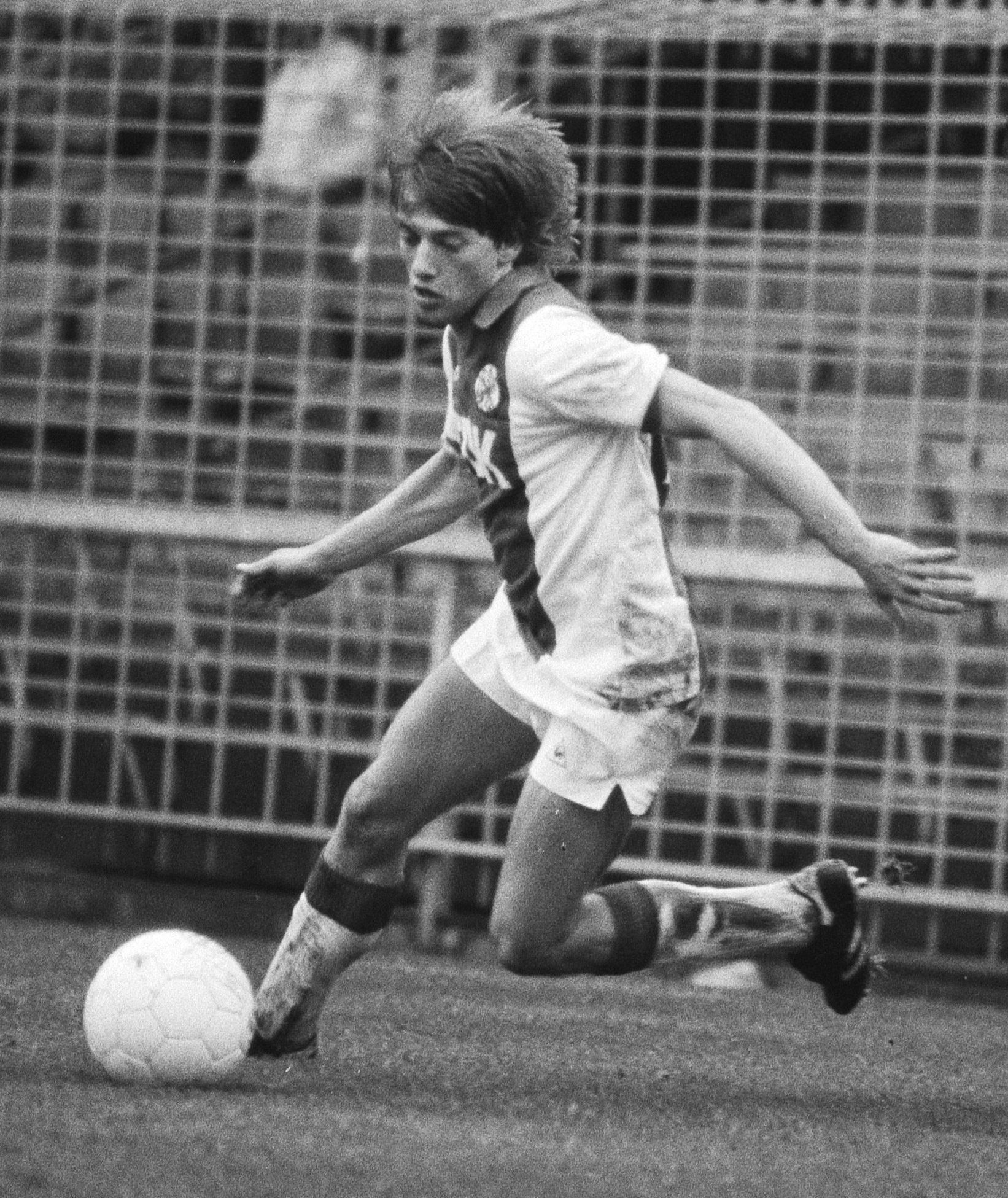
Jesper Olsen, 1983

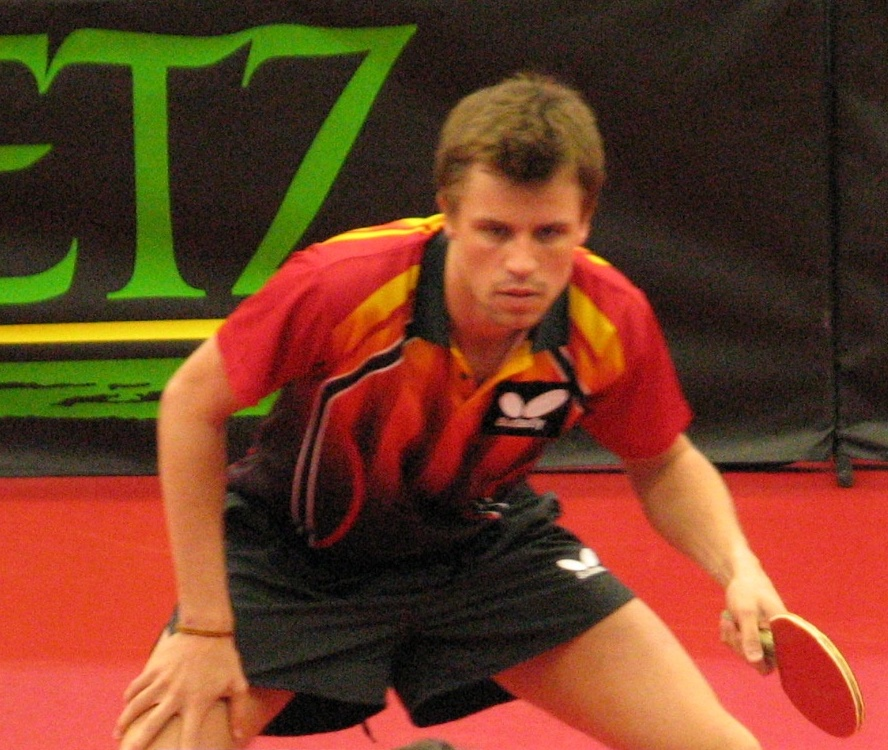
Michael Maze, 2007

- Possibly: Rollo (c. 846 in Faxe - c. 930) a viking and the first ruler of Normandy.
- Joachim Neergaard (1877 in Stubberup – 1920) a Danish composer.
- Ib Nielsen (born 1926 in Faxe) a Danish rower, competed at the 1948 Summer Olympics
- Knud Nielsen (born 1936 in Faxe) a Danish rower, competed at the 1960 and 1964 Summer Olympics
- Jens Berendt Jensen (born 1940 in Faxe) a Danish rower, competed at the 1960 and 1964 Summer Olympics
- Sven Lysholt Hansen (born 1945 in Faxe) a Danish rower, competed in the 1960 Summer Olympics
- Niels Olsen (born 1948 in Faxe) a Danish rower, competed at the 1964 Summer Olympics
- Jesper Olsen (born 1961 in Faxe) a Danish former footballer with 402 club caps and 43 for Denmark
- Michael Maze (born 1981 in Faxe) a former professional table tennis player

== Gallery ==
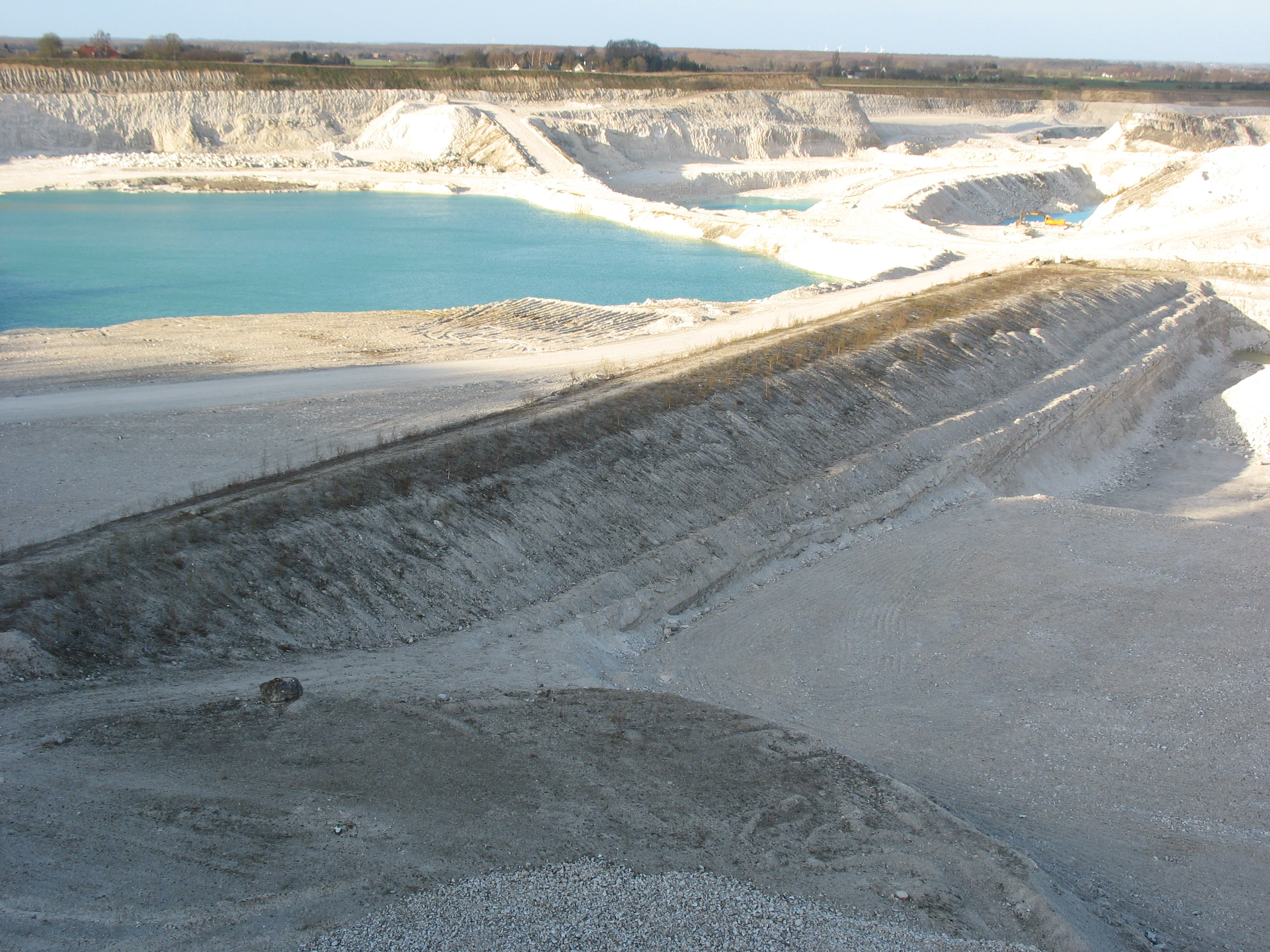
Faxe Kalkbrud lime quarry

== See also ==
- Dalby, Faxe Municipality
- Faxe Ladeplads
- Haslev
- Karise
- Rønnede
