= Ian Johnston (rowing) =

Australian rowing coxswain (1947–2018)

Personal information
- Nationality: Australian
- Born: 18 June 1947 Victoria, Australia
- Died: 4 September 2018 (aged 71)

Sport
- Sport: Rowing

Ian Johnston (18 June 1947 – 4 September 2018) was an Australian representative rowing coxswain and Australia's youngest ever Olympian. He competed in the men's coxed pair event at the 1960 Summer Olympics aged 13 years and 75 days and as of 2023 remains as Australia's youngest ever Olympian.

== Rowing career ==
Johnston competed for the Banks Rowing Club in Melbourne.

Following the 1960 King's Cup win by Western Australia and the in-toto selection of that crew as the Australian eight for the 1960 Rome Olympics, test races were held in Victoria and New South Wales for the other boats. The coxed pair was graded as the fifth priority boat and Victorians Paul Guest, his King's Cup crew-mate Neville Howell and their Banks Rowing Club coxswain Johnston prevailed in a selection trial in Ballarat. They had to finance their own travel to the Rome Olympics, where as a coxed pair rowing in the only competing shell with its coxswain in the stern, they placed fourth in both their heat and repêchage.
