= Enrique Castelló =

Spanish rower

Personal information
- Nationality: Spanish
- Born: 13 February 1938 Seville, Spain
- Died: 10 March 2009 (aged 71) Seville, Spain

Sport
- Sport: Rowing

Enrique Castelló (13 February 1938 – 10 March 2009) was a Spanish rower. He competed in the men's coxed pair event at the 1960 Summer Olympics.
