= Klaus Hahn =

German rower (1925–2019)

Personal information
- Nationality: German
- Born: 4 December 1925; Heilbronn, Germany
- Died: 10 June 2019 (aged 93); Lacanau, France

Sport
- Sport: Rowing

Klaus Friedrich Karl Hahn (4 December 1925 – 10 June 2019) was a German rower. He competed in the men's coxless pair event at the 1952 Summer Olympics, representing Saar. He died in June 2019 at the age of 93, leaving just two living former competitors who had represented Saar at the Olympics.
