= Carl Kuntze =

Dutch rower

Personal information
- Nationality: Dutch
- Born: 29 October 1922; Rotterdam, Netherlands
- Died: 26 May 2006 (aged 83)

Sport
- Sport: Rowing

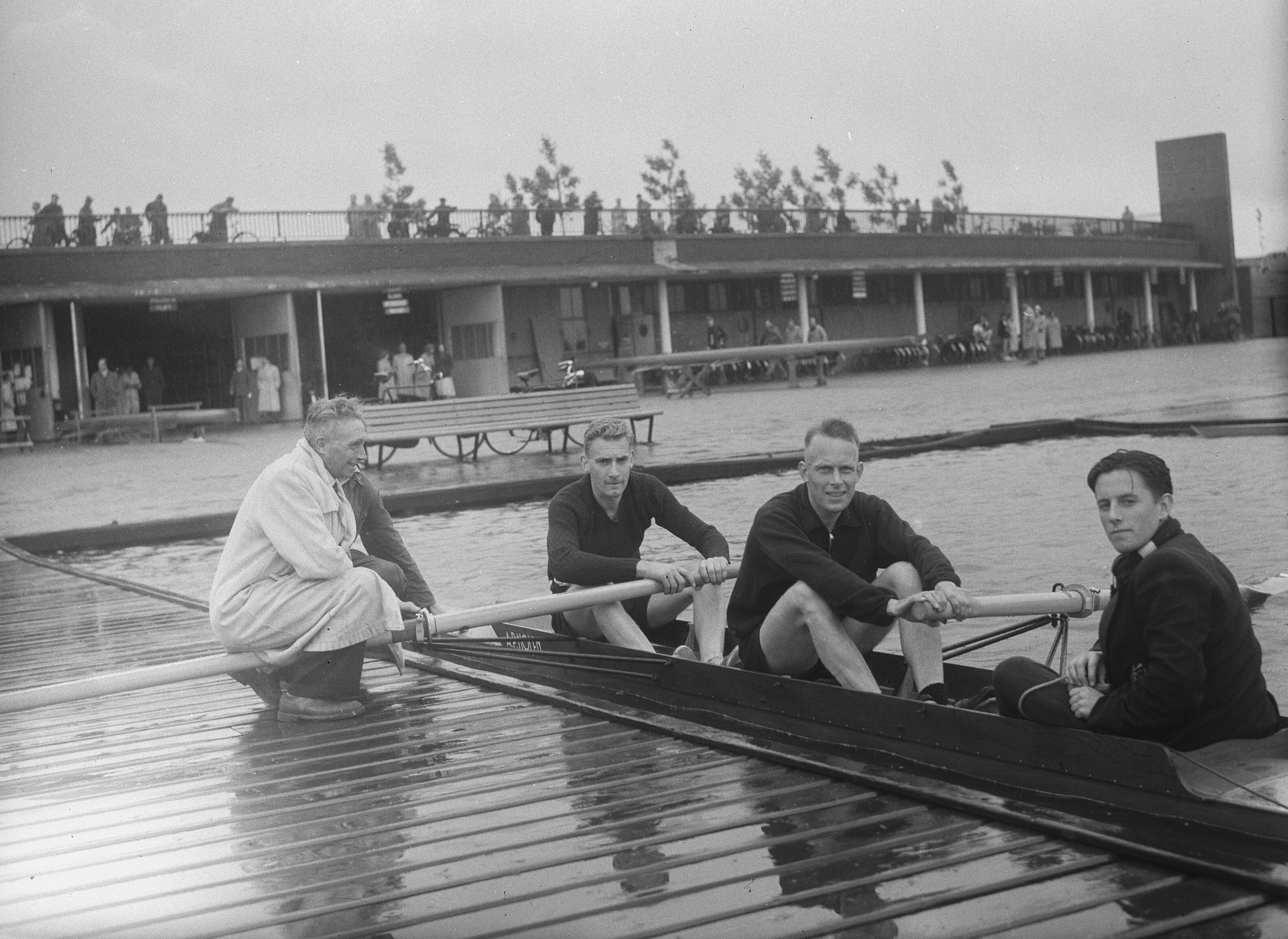

Carl Kuntze (29 October 1922 – 26 May 2006) was a Dutch rower. He competed in the men's coxless pair event at the 1952 Summer Olympics.
