= Stanisław Wieśniak =

Polish rower

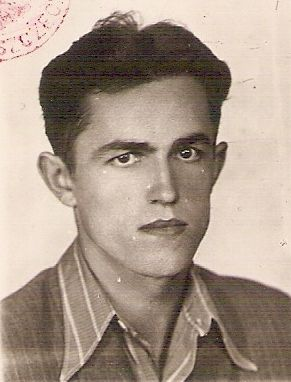
- Wieśniak in 1953

Personal information
- Nationality: Polish
- Born: 14 March 1930 Wilno, Poland
- Died: 21 February 2012 (aged 81) Szczecin, Poland

Sport
- Sport: Rowing

Stanisław Wieśniak (14 March 1930 – 21 February 2012) was a Polish rower. He competed in the men's coxless pair event at the 1952 Summer Olympics.
