= Herbert Kesel =

German rower

Personal information
- Nationality: German
- Born: 3 November 1931; Mannheim, Germany
- Died: 5 December 2011 (aged 80)

Sport
- Sport: Rowing

Herbert Kesel (3 November 1931 – 15 December 2011) was a German rower. He competed in the men's coxless pair event at the 1952 Summer Olympics, representing Saar.
