= Renzo Ostino =

Italian rower (1936–2020)

Personal information
- Born: 7 May 1936 Turin, Italy
- Died: 19 April 2020 (aged 83) Italy
- Height: 190 cm (6 ft 3 in)
- Weight: 88 kg (194 lb)

Sport
- Sport: Rowing
Medal record
Men's rowing
Representing Italy
European Rowing Championships
Silver medal – second place	1958 Poznań	Coxed pair
Silver medal – second place	1959 Mâcon	Coxed pair

Renzo Ostino (7 May 1936 – 19 April 2020) was an Italian rower. He competed at the 1960 Summer Olympics in Rome with the men's coxed pair where they came fifth.
