= Mikhail Plaksin =

Soviet rower

Personal information
- Born: 24 January 1929
- Died: 17 January 1996 (aged 66)

Sport
- Sport: Rowing

Mikhail Andreyevich Plaksin (Russian: Михаил Андреевич Плаксин; 24 January 1929 – 17 January 1996) was a Russian rower who represented the Soviet Union. He competed at the 1952 Summer Olympics in Helsinki with the men's coxless pair where they were eliminated in the round one repêchage.
