= Jan Świątkowski =

Polish rower

Personal information
- Nationality: Polish
- Born: 31 December 1920; Bydgoszcz, Poland
- Died: 2007 (aged 86–87); Bydgoszcz, Poland

Sport
- Sport: Rowing

Jan Świątkowski (31 December 1920 – 2007) was a Polish rower. He competed in the men's coxless pair event at the 1952 Summer Olympics.
