= José Sahuquillo =

Spanish rower

Personal information
- Nationality: Spanish
- Born: 9 January 1939 (age 86); Mérida, Spain

Sport
- Sport: Rowing

José Sahuquillo (born 9 January 1939) is a Spanish rower. He competed in the men's coxed pair event at the 1960 Summer Olympics.
