= Sven Lysholt Hansen =

Danish rower

Personal information
- Nationality: Danish
- Born: 28 June 1945 (age 79); Faxe, Denmark

Sport
- Sport: Rowing

Sven Lysholt Hansen (born 28 June 1945) is a Danish rower. He competed in the men's coxed pair event at the 1960 Summer Olympics.
