= Edgard Luca =

Belgian rower

Personal information
- Nationality: Belgian
- Born: 5 October 1941 (age 83); Oudenburg, Belgium

Sport
- Sport: Rowing

Edgard Luca (born 5 October 1941) is a Belgian rower. He competed in the men's coxed pair event at the 1960 Summer Olympics.
