= Osvaldo Cavagnaro =

Argentine rower

Personal information
- Born: 22 April 1938 Rosario, Argentina
- Died: 8 February 2024 (aged 85)

Sport
- Sport: Rowing

Osvaldo Cavagnaro (22 April 1938 – 8 February 2024) was an Argentine rower. He competed in the men's coxed pair event at the 1960 Summer Olympics.
