= Jean-Pierre Souche =

French rower (1927–2020)

Personal information
- Born: Jean-Pierre Louis Souche; 2 September 1927 Paris, France
- Died: 10 January 2020 (aged 92) Guérande, France

Sport
- Sport: Rowing
Medal record
Men's rowing
Representing France
European Rowing Championships
Bronze medal – third place	1951 Mâcon	Coxless four

Jean-Pierre Louis Souche (2 September 1927 – 10 January 2020) was a French rower who competed in the 1948 Summer Olympics and in the 1952 Summer Olympics. He was born in Paris. In 1948 he was a crew member of the French boat which was eliminated in the semi-finals of the coxed fours event. Four years later he and his partner René Guissart finished fifth in the coxless pairs event. He died in Guérande in January 2020 at the age of 92.
