= Ken Lester =

British rower

Personal information
- Nationality: British
- Born: 9 April 1947 (age 77); Didcot, England

Sport
- Sport: Rowing

Ken Lester (born 9 April 1947) is a British rower and cox. He competed in the men's coxed pair event at the 1960 Summer Olympics as the cox at the age of 13, and is Britain's youngest male Olympian.
