= Richard Draeger =

American rower (1937–2016)

Personal information
- Full name: Richard Arthur Draeger
- Born: 22 September 1937 Pasadena, California, U.S.
- Died: February 8, 2016 (aged 78) Novato, California, U.S.
Medal record
Men's rowing
Representing United States
Olympic Games
Bronze medal – third place	1960 Rome	Coxed pair

Richard Arthur Draeger (September 22, 1937 - February 8, 2016) was an American rower who competed in the 1960 Summer Olympics.

He was born in Pasadena, California. In 1960 he was a crew member of the American boat which won the bronze medal in the coxed pairs event. He died of complications from cancer on February 8, 2016 surrounded by his family.
