= Václav Chalupa Sr. =

Czech rower

Václav Chalupa
Personal information
- Born: 31 October 1934 (age 91) Jindřichův Hradec, Czechoslovakia
- Height: 186 cm (6 ft 1 in)
- Weight: 96 kg (212 lb)
- Relatives: Václav Chalupa (son)

Sport
- Sport: Rowing
Medal record
Men's rowing
Representing Czechoslovakia
European Championships
Bronze medal – third place	1961 Prague	Coxed pair

Václav Chalupa (born 31 October 1934) is a Czech rower who represented Czechoslovakia. He competed at the 1960 Summer Olympics in Rome with the men's coxed pair where they were eliminated in the round one repêchage.
