= Roland Bollenberg =

Belgian rower

Personal information
- Nationality: Belgian
- Born: 28 June 1941 (age 84) Ostend, Belgium

Sport
- Sport: Rowing

Roland Bollenberg (born 28 June 1941) is a Belgian rower. He competed in the men's coxed pair event at the 1960 Summer Olympics.
