= Miroslav Strejček =

Czech rower

Personal information
- Born: 16 January 1929 Slivínko, Czechoslovakia
- Died: 19 March 2000 (aged 71)
- Height: 176 cm (5 ft 9 in)
- Weight: 86 kg (190 lb)

Sport
- Sport: Rowing
Medal record
Men's rowing
Representing Czechoslovakia
European Championships
Bronze medal – third place	1961 Prague	Coxed pair

Miroslav Strejček (16 January 1929 – 19 March 2000) was a Czech rower. He competed for Czechoslovakia at the 1960 Summer Olympics in Rome with the men's coxed pair where they were eliminated in the round one repêchage. He died in 2000.
