= Jorge Somlay =

Argentine rower

Personal information
- Born: 8 September 1946 (age 78); Rosario, Argentina

Sport
- Sport: Rowing

Jorge Somlay (born 8 September 1946) is an Argentine rower. He competed in the men's coxed pair event at the 1960 Summer Olympics.
