= Vic Middleton =

Australian rower

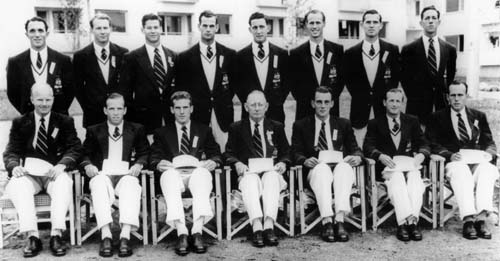
- Middleton (back row 2nd from right) in the 1952 Olympic rowing squad

Personal information
- Full name: Victor Ronald Middleton
- Nationality: Australian
- Born: 21 September 1928 (age 97) Picton, New South Wales, Australia

Sport
- Sport: Rowing
- Club: Sydney Rowing Club

Achievements and titles
- National finals: King's Cup 1950-52

Victor Ronald Middleton (born 21 September 1928) is an Australian former representative rower. He was twice a national champion and competed in the men's coxless pair event at the 1952 Summer Olympics.

== Club and state rowing ==
Middleton's senior club rowing was from Sydney Rowing Club.

His first state selection for New South Wales was into the 1950 men's senior eight contesting the King's Cup at the Australian annual Interstate Regatta. That crew was victorious. He made further New South Wales King's Cup crews in 1951 (gold) and 1952 (silver).

En route to the 1952 Helsinki Olympics the Australian men's sweep squad selected an eight which raced as Sydney Rowing Club entrants in the Grand Challenge Cup at the 1952 Henley Royal Regatta. Middleton was in the two seat of that Sydney crew which made the final and finished as runners up to Leander.

== International representative rowing ==
The Australian men's eight selected for the 1950 British Empire Games was the winning 1949 New South Wales King's cup crew in which Middleton did not row. He was however selected as a reserve for the Empire Games eight.

For the 1952 Helsinki Olympics the 1951 New South Wales King's Cup crew was selected as the Australian men's eight. By the time of final seat selections Middleton in the two seat and Don Palmer at three had been replaced by Ernie Chapman and Don Anderson who'd been reserves in the NSW eight. Middleton and Palmer rowed a men's coxless pair in Helsinki. They won their heat, were second in their semi-final but the system of the time then put them into a second repechage where they were knocked out.
