= Vasily Bagretsov =

Soviet rower (born 1930)

Personal information
- Born: 1930

Sport
- Sport: Rowing

Vasily Ivanovich Bagretsov (Russian: Василий Иванович Багрецов; born 1930) is a Russian rower who represented the Soviet Union. He competed at the 1952 Summer Olympics in Helsinki with the men's coxless pair where they were eliminated in the round one repêchage.
