= Kurt Schmid =

Swiss rower (1932–2000)

Personal information
- Born: 11 February 1932 Baar, Switzerland
- Died: 2 December 2000 (aged 68)
- Relatives: Karl Schmid (father)

Sport
- Sport: Rowing
Medal record
Men's rowing
Representing Switzerland
Olympic Games
Bronze medal – third place	1952 Helsinki	Coxless pair
European Rowing Championships
Gold medal – first place	1950 Milan	Coxless pair
Bronze medal – third place	1951 Mâcon	Coxless pair

Kurt Schmid (11 February 1932 – 2 December 2000) was a Swiss rower who competed in the 1952 Summer Olympics and in the 1960 Summer Olympics.

Schmid was born in 1932 in Baar, Switzerland, the son of Olympic rower Karl Schmid. Schmid Jr. rowed in the coxless pair with his partner Hans Kalt. They won gold at the 1950 European Rowing Championships in Milan, and bronze at the 1951 European Rowing Championships in Mâcon. At the 1952 Summer Olympics, they won the bronze medal for Switzerland in the coxless pair event. Eight years later, in 1960, he participated as a crew member for the Swiss boat which finished sixth in the Olympic coxless four competition.
