= Vincenzo Bruno =

Italian rower (1933–2021)

Personal information
- Born: 2 July 1933 Turin, Italy
- Died: 18 August 2021 (aged 88)
- Height: 165 cm (5 ft 5 in)
- Weight: 51 kg (112 lb)

Sport
- Sport: Rowing
Medal record
Men's rowing
Representing Italy
European Rowing Championships
Silver medal – second place	1958 Poznań	Coxed pair
Silver medal – second place	1959 Mâcon	Coxed pair

Vincenzo Bruno (2 July 1933 – 18 August 2021) was an Italian coxswain. He competed at the 1960 Summer Olympics in Rome with the men's coxed pair where they came fifth.
