= Stig Winter =

Finnish rower

Personal information
- Nationality: Finnish
- Born: 1 March 1929; Turku, Finland
- Died: 26 January 2010 (aged 80)

Sport
- Sport: Rowing

Stig Winter (1 March 1929 – 26 January 2010) was a Finnish rower. He competed in the men's coxless pair event at the 1952 Summer Olympics.
