= Arnold Wientjes =

Dutch rower

Personal information
- Nationality: Dutch
- Born: 17 June 1938; The Hague, Netherlands
- Died: 7 April 1999 (aged 60)

Sport
- Sport: Rowing

Arnold Wientjes (17 June 1938 – 7 April 1999) was a Dutch rower. He competed in the men's coxed pair event at the 1960 Summer Olympics.
