= Klaus Zerta =

German rowing cox

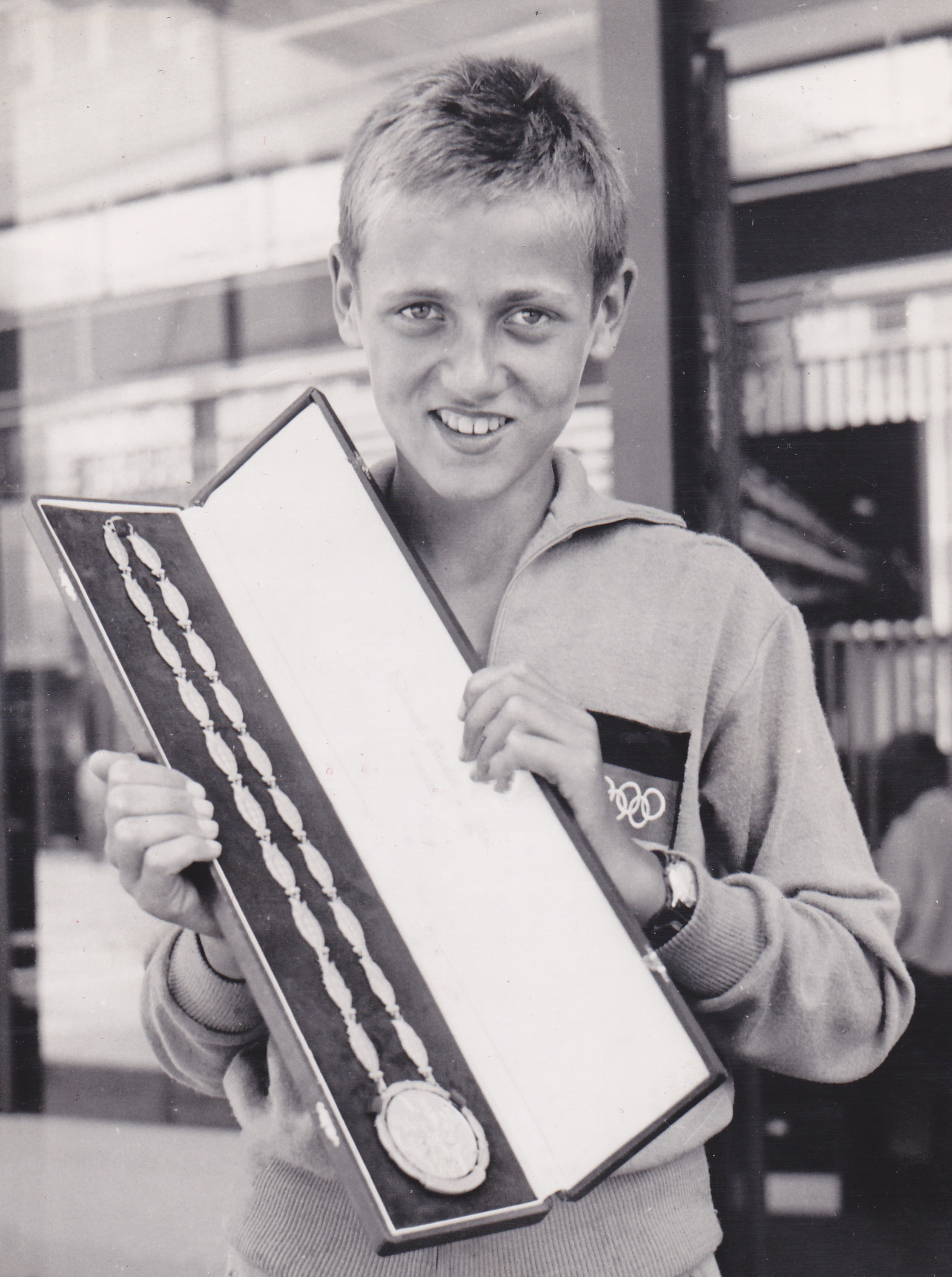
- Klaus Zerta at the 1960 Olympics

Personal information
- Born: 25 November 1946 (age 79) Gelsenkirchen, Germany
- Height: 1.65 m (5 ft 5 in)
- Weight: 48 kg (106 lb)

Sport
- Country: Germany
- Sport: Rowing
- Club: RV Gelsenkirchen
Medal record
Representing Germany
Olympic Games
Gold medal – first place	1960 Rome	Coxed pair

Klaus Zerta (born 25 November 1946) is a retired German rowing coxswain. He was born in Gelsenkirchen.

He was part of the West German team that won gold medals at the 1960 Summer Olympics in the coxed pair event competing for the United Team of Germany. Zerta was the youngest medalist at the 1960 Games. He is the youngest confirmed male gold medalist in Olympic history. He was 13 years and 283 days when he won the gold in the men's coxed pair in 1960.

He later became a tennis coach and worked as a construction manager.
