= Antonio Saverio =

Italian rower (1932–1995)

Personal information
- Nationality: Italian
- Born: 25 March 1932; Lecco, Italy
- Died: 8 June 1995 (aged 63)

Sport
- Sport: Rowing

Antonio Saverio (25 March 1932 – 8 June 1995) was an Italian rower. He competed in the men's coxless pair event at the 1952 Summer Olympics in Helsinki in Finland.
