= Kent Mitchell =

American rower (born 1939)

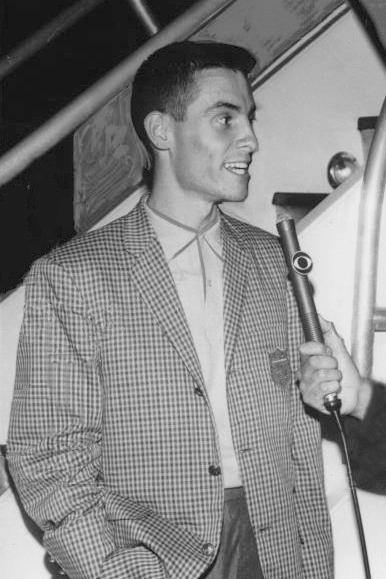
- Mitchell in 1960

Personal information
- Born: March 29, 1939 (age 87) Albany, New York, U.S.
- Height: 173 cm (5 ft 8 in)
- Weight: 51 kg (112 lb)

Sport
- Sport: Rowing
- Club: Stanford Cardinal
Medal record
Representing the United States
Olympic Games
Gold medal – first place	1964 Tokyo	Coxed pair
Bronze medal – third place	1960 Rome	Coxed pair

Henry Kent Mitchell II (born March 29, 1939) is a retired American rowing coxswain. He competed in the coxed pairs at the 1960 and 1964 Olympics and won a bronze and a gold medal, respectively. He was a law student at the UC Berkeley School of Law at the time. He won a bronze medal in the same event in 1960 while an undergraduate at Stanford University (class of 1961). Only two other Americans have coxed two crews to Olympic medals. He also coxed Stanford to two national championships, in 1961 and 1962.

Following graduation from law school in 1965 he practiced law in Palo Alto, California. He also set up and leads the Kent Mitchell Rowing Club, an elite masters competitive organization composed mostly of former national or Olympic champions. He also served three terms as mayor of Portola Valley, California.

He is in the Stanford University Hall of Fame and the National Rowing Hall of Fame.
