= Jeffrey Reeves =

British rower

Personal information
- Nationality: British
- Born: 15 January 1936 (age 89); Reading, England

Sport
- Sport: Rowing

Jeffrey Reeves (born 15 January 1936) is a British rower. He competed in the men's coxed pair event at the 1960 Summer Olympics.
