= Tom Price (rower) =

American rower (born 1933)

Personal information
- Born: May 28, 1933 (age 93) Long Branch, New Jersey, U.S.
Medal record
Men's rowing
Representing the United States
Olympic Games
Gold medal – first place	1952 Helsinki	Coxless pair

Thomas Steele Price (born May 28, 1933) is an American rower who competed in the 1952 Summer Olympics.

He was born in Long Branch, New Jersey. In 1952, he won the gold medal with his partner Charlie Logg in the coxless pairs event.
