= Mario Maire =

Argentine rower

Personal information
- Born: 28 January 1935 (age 90); Rosario, Argentina

Sport
- Sport: Rowing

Mario Maire (born 28 January 1935) is an Argentine rower. He competed in the men's coxed pair event at the 1960 Summer Olympics.
