= David Callender =

British rower (1930–2022)

Personal information
- Nationality: British
- Born: 25 July 1930 Norwich, England
- Died: 18 March 2022 (aged 91) Henley-on-Thames, England

Sport
- Sport: Rowing

David Norman Callender (25 July 1930 – 18 March 2022) was a British rower. He competed in the men's coxless pair event at the 1952 Summer Olympics. Callender died in Henley-on-Thames on 18 March 2022, at the age of 91.
