= Palle Tillisch =

Danish rower (1920–1994)

Personal information
- Born: 2 August 1920 Gentofte, Denmark
- Died: 12 December 1994 (aged 74) Gentofte, Denmark
- Spouse: Bodil Sprechler

Sport
- Sport: Rowing
Medal record
Men's rowing
Representing Denmark
European Rowing Championships
Silver medal – second place	1951 Mâcon	Coxless pair

Palle Tillisch (2 August 1920 – 12 December 1994) was a Danish rower. He competed at the 1952 Summer Olympics in Helsinki with the men's coxless pair where they were eliminated in the semi-finals repêchage.

He was married on 2 February 1959 to Bodil Sprechler. He was a member of the Folketing from 4 December 1973 to 9 January 1975 for the Progress Party in the Copenhagen County constituency.
