= Bengt Ahlström =

Finnish rower (1924–2001)

Personal information
- Nationality: Finnish
- Born: 24 December 1924 Jakobstad, Finland
- Died: 22 October 2001 (aged 76) Helsinki, Finland

Sport
- Sport: Rowing

Bengt Ahlström (24 December 1924 – 22 October 2001) was a Finnish rower. He competed in the men's coxless pair event at the 1952 Summer Olympics.
