= Banks Rowing Club =

Rowing club in Melbourne

- Location: 3 Boathouse Drive, Melbourne, Australia
- Home water: Yarra River, Melbourne
- Founded: 29 August 1866
- Affiliations: Rowing Victoria
- Website: https://www.banksrowing.com/about/

Banks Rowing Club is based in Melbourne, Australia on the Yarra River. Banks Rowing Club was founded in 1866.

== Presidents ==
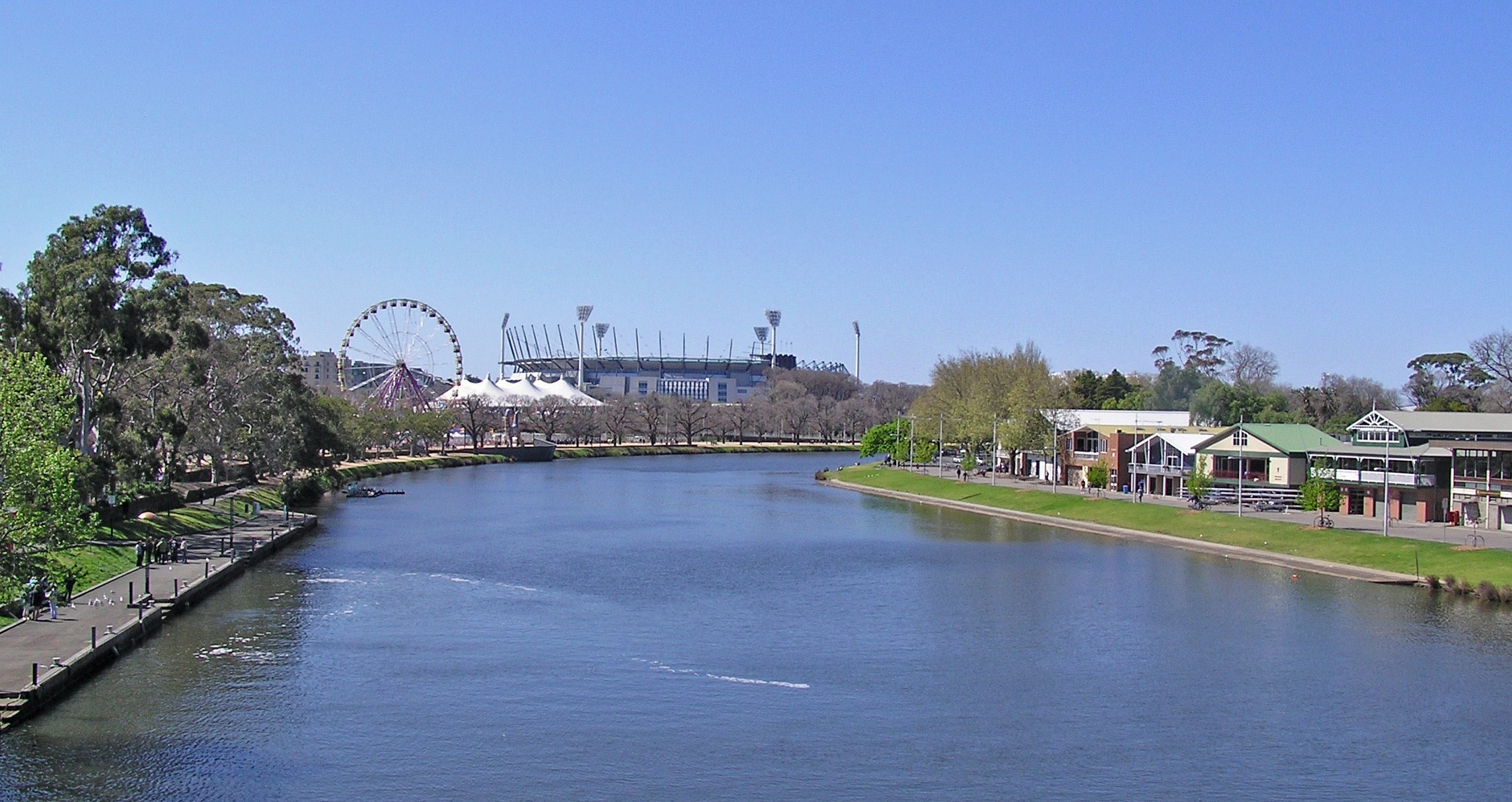
Yarra River and Banks Rowing Club (right)

Club presidents	Term
Adam Burnes	1866–1871
Henry Gyles Turner Esq.	1871–1921
O. Morrice Williams Esq.	1921–1938
Sir Leslie James McConnan	1938–1954
Hugh D.T.Williamson	1955–1961
Henry Follett Clarke	1961–1970
Charles Henry Rennie CBE	1970–1991
Peter James Fraser	1992–1997
Brian Vear	1997–2006
Paul Marshall Guest	2006–2016
James Lowe	2016–current

== Notable members ==
Notable members Include

=== Olympic representatives ===
- Walter Howell
- Paul Guest
- Brian Vear
- James Lowe
- Rosemary Popa

=== Paralympic representatives ===
- Susannah Lutze

=== Non-Olympic notable members ===
- Leeanne Whitehouse
