= František Staněk =

Czech coxswain (born 1944)

Personal information
- Born: 24 April 1944 (age 80); Jindřichův Hradec, Protectorate of Bohemia and Moravia
- Height: 160 cm (5 ft 3 in)
- Weight: 50 kg (110 lb)

Sport
- Sport: Rowing

František Staněk (born 24 April 1944) is a Czech coxswain who represented Czechoslovakia. He competed at the 1960 Summer Olympics in Rome with the men's coxed pair where they were eliminated in the round one repêchage.
