= Bent Jensen (rower) =

Danish rower (1925–2016)

Personal information
- Born: 30 October 1925 Sorø, Denmark
- Died: 4 November 2016 (aged 91)

Sport
- Sport: Rowing
Medal record
Men's rowing
Representing Denmark
European Rowing Championships
Silver medal – second place	1951 Mâcon	Coxless pair

Georg Egon Bent Jensen (30 October 1925 – 4 November 2016) was a Danish rower. He competed at the 1952 Summer Olympics in Helsinki with the men's coxless pair where they were eliminated in the semi-final repechage.
