= Charlie Logg =

American rower (born 1931)

Personal information
- Full name: Charles Paul Logg Jr.
- Born: February 24, 1931 (age 95) Princeton, New Jersey, U.S.
Medal record
Men's rowing
Representing the United States
Olympic Games
Gold medal – first place	1952 Helsinki	Coxless pair

Charles Paul Logg Jr. (born February 24, 1931) is an American rower who competed in the 1952 Summer Olympics. He was born in Princeton, New Jersey. In 1952, he won the gold medal with his partner Tom Price in the coxless pairs event.
