= Bruno Gamba =

Italian rower

Personal information
- Nationality: Italian
- Born: 30 May 1929; Lecco, Italy
- Died: 12 March 1987 (aged 57)

Sport
- Sport: Rowing

Bruno Gamba (30 May 1929 – 12 March 1987) was an Italian rower. He competed in the men's coxless pair event at the 1952 Summer Olympics.
