= Joaquín del Real =

Spanish rower (1941–2018)

Personal information
- Nationality: Spanish
- Born: 24 May 1941; Seville, Spain
- Died: 4 April 2018 (aged 76)

Sport
- Sport: Rowing

Joaquín del Real (24 May 1941 – 4 April 2018) was a Spanish rower. He competed in the men's coxed pair event at the 1960 Summer Olympics.
