= Owe Lostad =

Swedish rowing cox

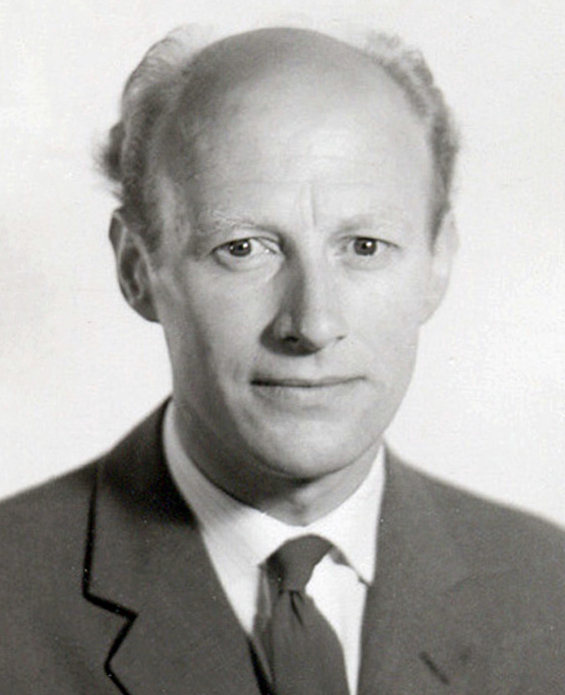

Personal information
- Born: 27 June 1922 Jönköping, Sweden
- Died: 12 October 2013 (aged 91) Jönköping, Sweden
- Height: 163 cm (5 ft 4 in)
- Weight: 51 kg (112 lb)

Sport
- Sport: Rowing
- Club: Jönköpings RS

Owe Rune Gustav Lostad (27 June 1922 – 12 October 2013) was a Swedish rowing coxswain. He competed in the coxed pairs, fours and eights at the 1960 Summer Olympics, but failed to reach the finals.
