= Walter Howell =

Australian rower

Olympic medal record

Men's rowing

Olympic Games
Bronze medal – third place	1956 Melbourne	Men's Eights

British Empire and Commonwealth Games
Gold medal – first place	1962 Perth	Men's Eights

Walter Neville Howell OAM (born 17 December 1929) is an Australian former representative and Olympic medal winning rower. He competed at two Olympic Games, racing at the 1956 Melbourne Olympics in the men's eight and at the 1960 Rome Olympics in the Men's coxed pair. He won a gold medal at the 1962 Perth Commonwealth Games in the Men's eight and represented in the Australian eight at the inaugural 1962 World Rowing Championships.

== Club and state rowing ==
Howell was born in the state of Victoria and initially rowed from the Preston Rowing Club in Melbourne before moving to the Banks Rowing Club from 1951. Howell first made state selection for Victoria in 1951 contesting the King's Cup at the Australian Interstate Regatta. He then rowed in every Victorian King's Cup crew from 1951 to 1962 except '58 and '61. In those ten crews he enjoyed six victories, three silver and one bronze medal finish.

== International representative rowing ==
In 1956 for the Melbourne Olympics the winning Kings Cup Victorian eight was selected as the Australian men's eight excepting for the 3 seat – Benfield from New South Wales. Howell rowed in the six seat in the thrilling final where the Australian eight took it to the US and Canadian crews and came away with a bronze medal. Four years later for the Rome 1960 Olympics he was selected with his Banks crew-mate Paul Guest and their 13 year old coxswain Ian Johnston to race Australia's coxed pair. They were eliminated in the repechage.

The Banks RC men's senior eight were Victorian champions in 1962 and six of the oarsmen in that crew made up the 1962 Victorian King's Cup eight which was also victorious at the Interstate Regatta. That entire 1962 Victorian King's Cup crew was selected as the Australian eight to contest the 1962 Commonwealth Games. Howell stroked that boat to a gold medal victory at those games in Perth. That same crew was encouraged to represent Australia at the inaugural FISA World Championships, the 1962 World Championships in Lucerne. They financed their trip themselves, made it through to the final and finished in overall fifth place.

== Community contribution and leadership ==
After retirement from first-class rowing Howell lived and worked in the Ngambie and Bendigo region of northern Victoria. His community commendations noted in 2020 when Howell was awarded his Medal in the Order of Australia are set ought in Andrew Guerin's profile on Howell as in the Australian Rowing History and include the following:

- Rowing clubman: Ngambie Rowing Club President; Bendigo Rowing Club President, Coach and Life Member; Banks Rowing Club Committee man and Life Member.
- Rotarian: Bendigo South, member 1964-83 smf officeholder; Committee man for Rotary Youth Leadership Awards; District Governor's Representative.
- Sportsmen's Asscn of Australia : Bendigo Branch, Member 1965-1981 and President 1974-77.
- Rowing Victoria Hall of Fame : inducted 2015.
- School Councillor : Kangaroo Flat Technical School; Golden Square Secondary College.
- Committee member : Anti-Cancer Council Bendigo; Victorian Olympic Council Fundraising Committee.
