= Maarten van Dis =

Dutch rower

Personal information
- Nationality: Dutch
- Born: 24 April 1936 (age 88); Haarlem, Netherlands

Sport
- Sport: Rowing

Maarten van Dis (born 24 April 1936) is a Dutch rower. He competed in the men's coxed pair event at the 1960 Summer Olympics.
