= Ștefan Kurecska =

Romanian rower

Personal information
- Nationality: Romanian
- Born: 31 July 1933 (age 93) Arad, Romania

Sport
- Sport: Rowing

Ștefan Kurecska (born 31 July 1933) is a Romanian rower. He competed in two events at the 1960 Summer Olympics.
