= Ioannis Chrysochoou =

Greek rower (born 1934)

Personal information
- Born: 12 July 1934 (age 90); Piraeus, Greece

Sport
- Sport: Rowing

Ioannis Chrysochoou (Greek: Ιωάννης Χρυσοχόου; born 12 July 1934) is a Greek rower. He competed in the men's coxed pair event at the 1960 Summer Olympics.
