= Ben Binnendijk =

Dutch rower (1927–2020)

Personal information
- Nationality: Dutch
- Born: 15 November 1927; Utrecht, Netherlands
- Died: 24 December 2020 (aged 93)

Sport
- Sport: Rowing

Ben Binnendijk (15 November 1927 – 24 December 2020) was a Dutch rower. He competed in the men's coxless pair event at the 1952 Summer Olympics.
