= Dolní Slivno =

- Municipality
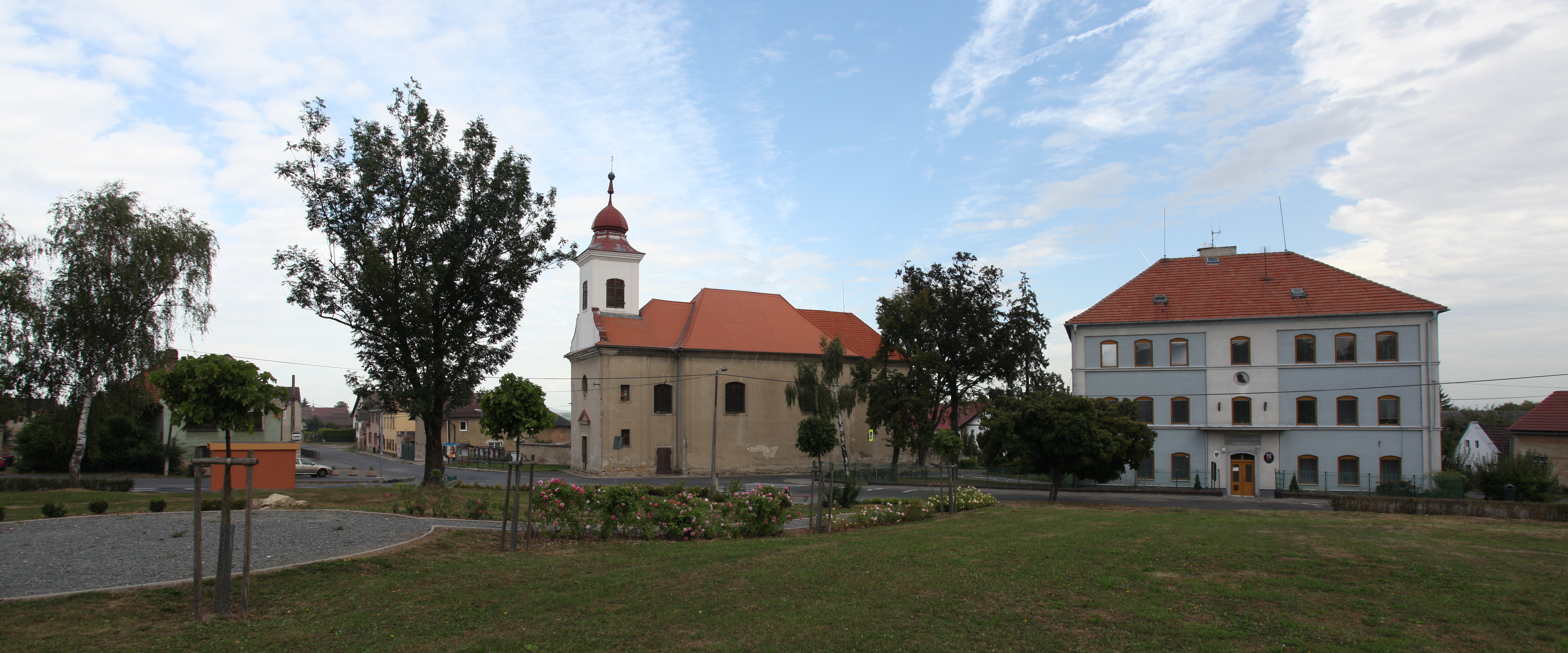
- Centre of Dolní Slivno with the Church of Saint Francis of Assisi and municipal office

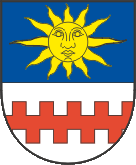
- Flag Coat of arms

- Location in the Czech Republic
- Coordinates: 50°18′32″N 14°43′58″E
- Country: Czech Republic
- Region: Central Bohemian
- District: Mladá Boleslav
- First mentioned: 1223

Area
  - Total: 11.36 km^{2} (4.39 sq mi)
- Elevation: 268 m (879 ft)

Population (2026-01-01)
  - Total: 399
  - Density: 35.1/km^{2} (91.0/sq mi)
- Time zone: UTC+1 (CET)
  - Summer (DST): UTC+2 (CEST)
- Postal code: 294 78
- Website: www.dolnislivno.cz

Dolní Slivno is a municipality and village in Mladá Boleslav District in the Central Bohemian Region of the Czech Republic. It has about 400 inhabitants.

== Administrative division ==
Dolní Slivno consists of two municipal parts (in brackets population according to the 2021 census):

- Dolní Slivno (309)
- Slivínko (53)

== Demographics ==
Historical population
Year	Pop.	±%
1869	532	—
1880	685	+28.8%
1890	719	+5.0%
1900	787	+9.5%
1910	869	+10.4%
1921	845	−2.8%
1930	748	−11.5%
1950	481	−35.7%
1961	493	+2.5%
1970	390	−20.9%
1980	320	−17.9%
1991	280	−12.5%
2001	312	+11.4%
2011	298	−4.5%
2021	362	+21.5%
Source: Censuses
