= Evert Gunnarsson =

Swedish rower (1929–2022)

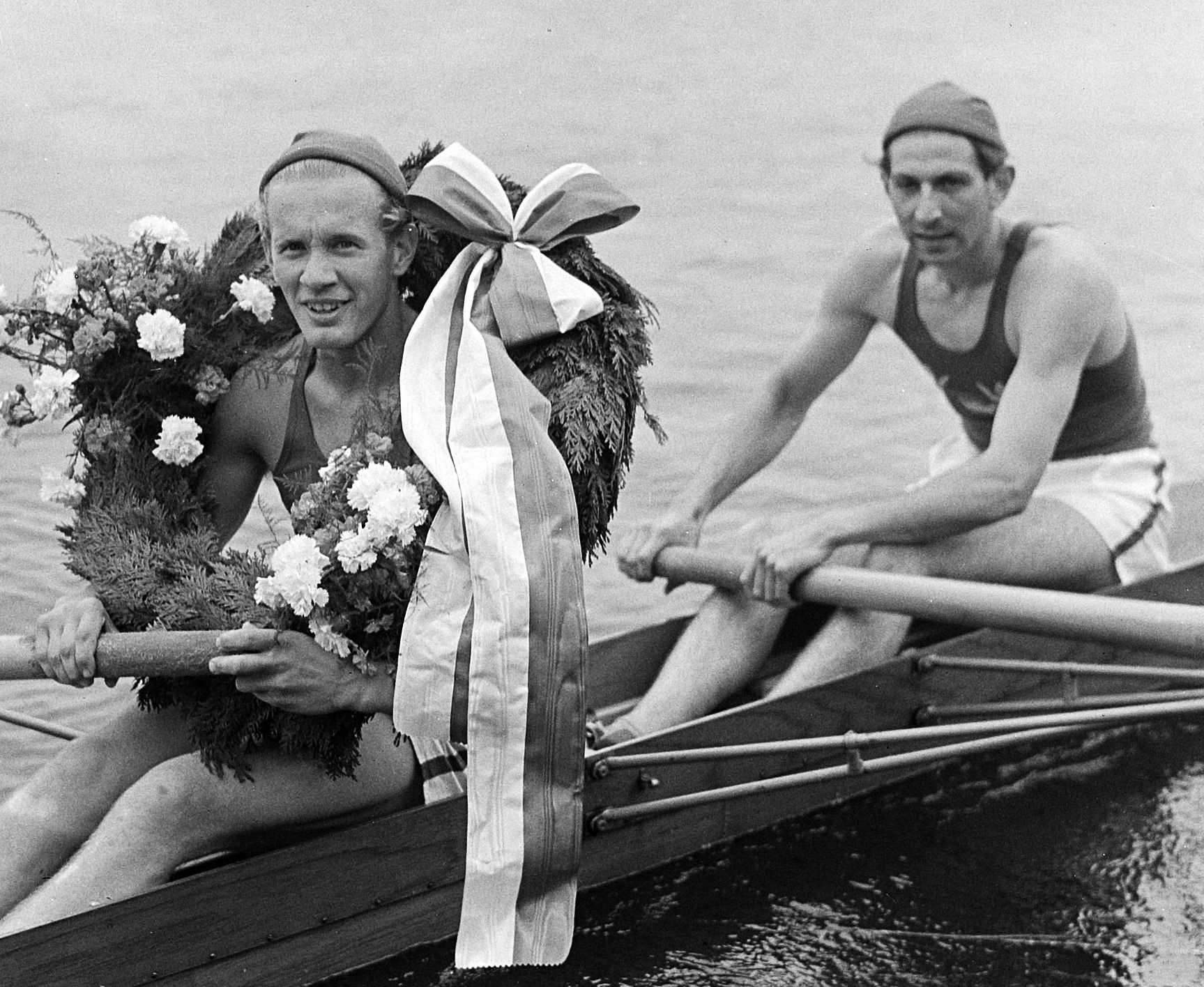
- Gunnarsson (left) and Bernt Torberntsson at the 1949 European championships

Personal information
- Born: 28 December 1929 Ljungskile, Sweden
- Died: 30 November 2022 (aged 92)

Sport
- Sport: Rowing
- Club: Kungälvs Simsällskap, Kungälv; Roddklubben Three Towns
Medal record
Representing Sweden
Olympic Games
| Silver medal – second place | 1956 Melbourne | Coxed four |
European Rowing Championships
| Gold medal – first place | 1949 Amsterdam | Coxless pair |
| Silver medal – second place | 1955 Ghent | Coxed four |
| Silver medal – second place | 1955 Ghent | Eights |

Sven Evert Gunnarsson (28 December 1929 – 30 November 2022) was a Swedish rower. In his early career he competed in the coxless pair. Together with Bernt Torberntsson he won the 1949 European Championships, but had no success at the 1948 and 1952 Olympics. He then changed to coxed fours and eights and won three silver medals at the 1955 European Championships and 1956 Olympics.
