= Bernt Torberntsson =

Swedish rower

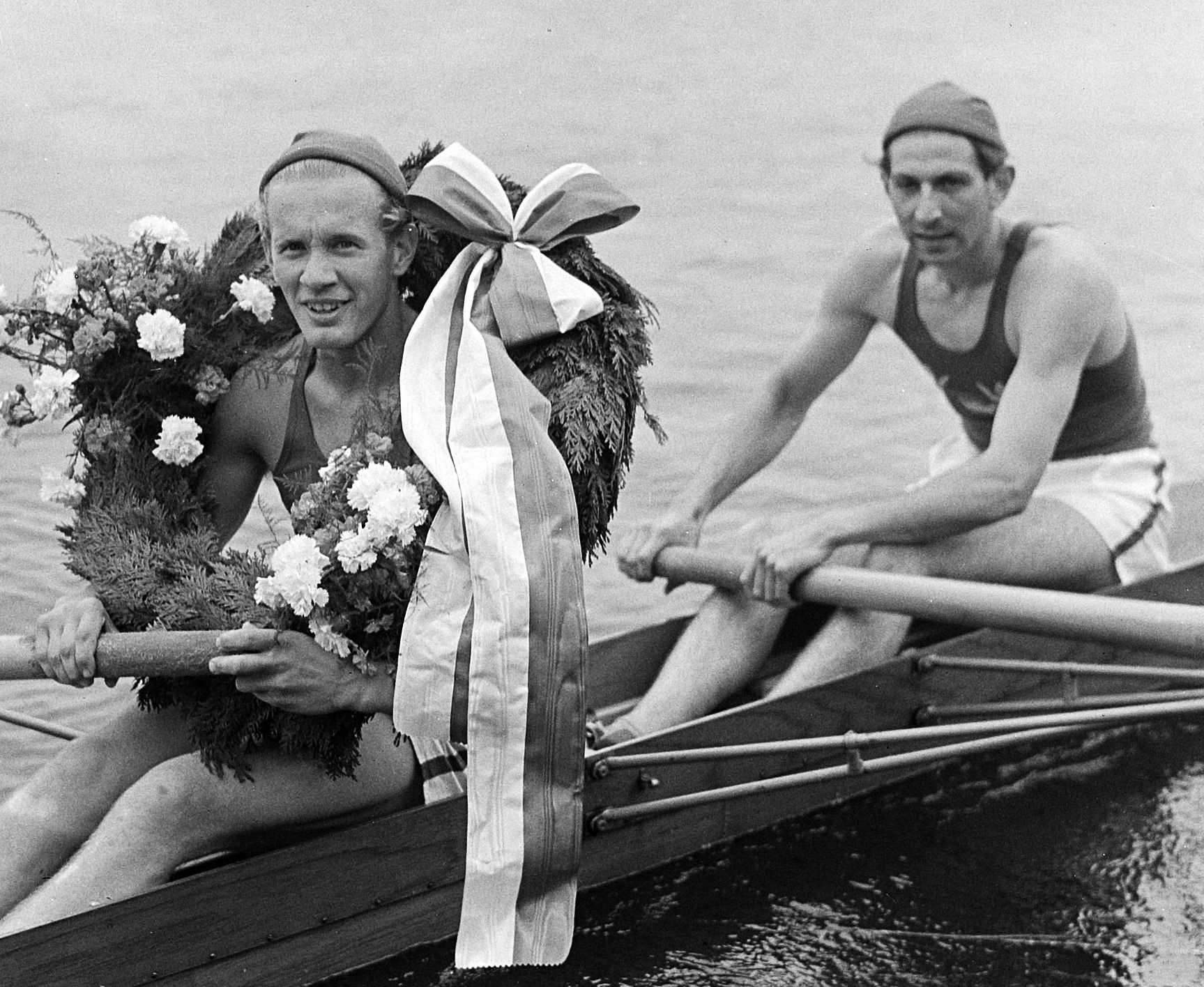
- Evert Gunnarsson and Bernt Torberntsson (right) at the 1949 European championships

Personal information
- Born: 20 April 1929 Kungälv, Sweden
- Died: 30 May 2017 (aged 88)

Sport
- Sport: Rowing
- Club: Kungälvs RK
Medal record
Representing Sweden
European Rowing Championships
| Gold medal – first place | 1949 Amsterdam | Coxless pair |

Bernt Sigurd Torberntsson (20 April 1929 – 30 May 2017) was a Swedish rower. Together with Evert Gunnarsson he won the 1949 European Championships in the coxless pair, but had no success at the 1948 and 1952 Olympics.
