= Donald Palmer =

American philosopher

Donald D. Palmer

Philosophical work
- Era: Contemporary philosophy
- Region: American philosophy
- Institutions: College of Marin in Kentfield, North Carolina State University
- Main interests: Philosophy education History of philosophy Existentialism
- Notable works: Looking at Philosophy, Does the Center Hold?, Kierkegaard for Beginners

Donald D. Palmer is Emeritus Professor of Philosophy at the College of Marin in Kentfield, California. He is known for writing introductory books on philosophy and philosophers which attempt to make philosophical ideas accessible to novices. He also illustrates his own books. Currently he is visiting assistant professor of philosophy at North Carolina State University in Raleigh, North Carolina.

== Bibliography ==
- Looking At Philosophy: The Unbearable Heaviness of Philosophy Made Lighter (Mayfield Publications, 1988)
- Does the Center Hold? An Introduction to Western Philosophy (Mayfield Publications, 1991)
- Structuralism and Poststructuralism for Beginners (Writers and Readers, 1995)
- Sartre for Beginners (Writers and Readers, 1995)
- Kierkegaard for Beginners (Writers and Readers, 1996)
- Visions of Human Nature: An Introduction (Mayfield Publications, 2000)
- Why It's Hard to Be Good: An Introduction to Ethical Theory (McGraw-Hill, Summer 2005)
