= Alberto Madero =

Argentine rower

Personal information
- Full name: Alberto Eduardo Madero Lanusse
- Born: 14 November 1923; Buenos Aires, Argentina
- Died: 1 November 2011 (aged 87); Buenos Aires, Argentina

Sport
- Sport: Rowing

Alberto Eduardo Madero Lanusse (14 November 1923 – 1 November 2011) was an Argentine rower. He competed at the 1948 Summer Olympics and the 1952 Summer Olympics.
