= Óscar Almirón =

Argentine rower

Personal information
- Full name: Óscar Ramón Almirón Giovanelli
- Born: 1 March 1927 Buenos Aires, Argentina
- Died: 17 December 2009 (aged 82)

Sport
- Sport: Rowing

Óscar Ramón Almirón Giovanelli (Note: In this Spanish name, the first or paternal surname is Almirón and the second or maternal family name is Giovanelli.) (1 March 1927 – 17 December 2009) was an Argentine rower. He competed at the 1948 Summer Olympics and the 1952 Summer Olympics.
