= Don Palmer (rower) =

Australian rower

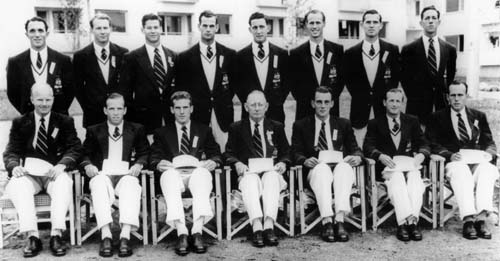
- Palmer (seated 1st left) in the 1952 Olympic rowing squad

Personal information
- Full name: Donald Redden Palmer
- Nationality: Australian
- Born: 1927 Sydney, New South Wales, Australia
- Died: 1 November 1980 (aged 52–53) Coogee, New South Wales, Australia

Sport
- Sport: Rowing

Donald Redden Palmer (1927 – 1 November 1980) was an Australian representative rower. He was a three time national champion and competed in the men's coxless pair event at the 1952 Summer Olympics.

== Club and state rowing ==
Palmer's senior club rowing was from Sydney Rowing Club.

His first state selection for New South Wales was into the 1949 men's senior eight to contest the King's Cup at the Australian annual Interstate Regatta, however he was the reserve for that crew and did not row. Palmer did make four further New South Wales King's Cup appearances with podium finishes every time. In 1950 (gold), in 1951 (gold), in 1952 (silver), and in 1954 (silver). In 1953 with Ernie Chapman he was selected for New South Wales to race the coxless pair Interstate Championship. They won the title.

En route to the 1952 Helsinki Olympics the Australian men's sweep squad selected an eight which raced as Sydney Rowing Club entrants in the Grand Challenge Cup at the 1952 Henley Royal Regatta. Palmer was in the two seat of that Sydney crew which made the final and finished as runners up to Leander.

== International representative rowing ==
The Australian men's eight selected for the 1950 British Empire Games was the winning 1949 New South Wales King's cup crew in which Palmer was a reserve. He was also selected as a reserve for the Empire Games eight.

For the 1952 Helsinki Olympics the 1951 New South Wales King's Cup crew was selected as the Australian men's eight. By the time of final seat selections Palmer at three and Vic Middleton in the two seat had been replaced by Ernie Chapman and Don Anderson who'd been reserves in the NSW eight. Palmer and Middleton rowed a men's coxless pair in Helsinki. They won their heat, were second in their semi-final but the system of the time then put them into a second repechage where they were knocked out.
