= Raúl Torrieri =

Uruguayan rower (born 1944)

Personal information
- Born: 7 August 1944 (age 80); Carmelo, Uruguay

Sport
- Sport: Rowing

Raúl Torrieri (born 7 August 1944) is a Uruguayan rower. He competed in the men's coxed pair event at the 1960 Summer Olympics.
