= Heinz Eichholz =

German rower

Personal information
- Nationality: German
- Born: 4 January 1927; Gelsenkirchen, Germany
- Died: 6 April 2001 (aged 74)

Sport
- Sport: Rowing

Heinz Eichholz (4 January 1927 – 6 April 2001) was a German rower. He competed in the men's coxless pair event at the 1952 Summer Olympics.
