= Paul Guest (rower) =

Australian rower (1939–2026)

Paul Guest OAM KC
Personal information
- Born: Paul Marshall Guest; 8 March 1939 Melbourne, Australia
- Died: 15 March 2026 (aged 87) Melbourne, Australia
- Education: University of Melbourne; Wesley College, Melbourne
- Occupations: Barrister, jurist
- Height: 6 ft 3 in (191 cm)
- Weight: 185 lb (84 kg)

Sport
- Club: Melbourne University Boat Club; Banks Rowing Club

Achievements and titles
- Olympic finals: B Final Tokyo 1964; B Final Mexico 1968
- National finals: King's Cup 1963–1975
Medal record
Men's rowing
Representing Australia
Commonwealth Games
Gold medal – first place	1962 Perth	Men's eight

Paul Marshall Guest (8 March 1939 – 15 March 2026) was an Australian representative rower, a family law barrister and Queen's Counsel who spent ten years as a judge on the bench of the Family Court of Australia, and an art philanthropist.

As a rower, he was a six-time Australian national champion, raced in nine King's Cup eights for Victoria over a 15-year period, and competed at three Olympic Games. As a Family Court justice, Guest's pivotal ruling in the "Re Patrick" case dealt with the complex area of known sperm donor's rights under the Family Law Act. Guest was also a collector and benefactor of contemporary art.

== Early life and education ==
Paul Marshall Guest was born in Victoria, Australia on 8 March 1939.

He attended Wesley College, Melbourne for his secondary education.

== Rowing career ==
=== Club and state rowing ===
At Wesley College Guest was introduced to rowing, but placed his sporting focus on athletics. His senior club rowing was initially from the Melbourne University Boat Club and later the Banks Rowing Club in Melbourne.

He was selected in the Victorian men's eights that contested the King's Cup at the Interstate Regatta within the Australian Rowing Championships in 1960, 1962, 1963, 1964, 1965, 1969, 1970, 1972 and 1975. Those Victorian eights won the King's Cup in 1962, 1963, 1964, 1969 and 1970.

Guest had been rowing in Victorian and Australian representative eights with David Ramage from 1963. In 1967, they teamed up as a coxless pair and Ramage joined Guest to train from the Banks Rowing Club. In 1967 and 1968, they won the Victorian and the New South Wales state titles. In 1968, they won the Australian national title.

=== International representative rowing ===
Following the 1960 King's Cup win by Western Australia and the whole selection of that crew as the Australian eight for the 1960 Rome Olympics, test races were held in Victoria and New South Wales for the other boats. The coxed pair was graded as the fifth priority boat and Guest and his King's Cup crew-mate Neville Howell prevailed in a selection trial in Ballarat. They had to finance their own travel to the Rome Olympics, where as a coxed pair with Ian Johnston on the rudder, they placed fourth in both their heat and repêchage.

The entire winning Victorian King's Cup crew of 1962 was selected as the Australian eight to contest the 1962 Commonwealth Games. Guest was in the five seat of that eight when they rowed to a gold medal victory at those games in Perth. That same crew was encouraged to represent Australia at the inaugural FISA World Championships, the 1962 World Championships in Lucerne. They financed their trip themselves, made it through to the final and finished in fifth place.

For the 1964 Tokyo Olympics, that year's winning Victorian King's Cup eight was again selected in toto. The Australian squad took a new Sargent & Burton eight with them to the Olympics but quickly saw that its design and technology was way behind the European built Donoratico and Stampfli shells being used by the other nations. They raced in a borrowed Donoratico eight for the B final with Guest in the five seat and finished in overall eighth place in the Olympic regatta.

The same selection criteria were used for the second World Rowing Championships held at Bled in 1966. The Victorian King's Cup crew of 1966 were selected as the Australian eight and with Guest again seated at five they rowed to a tenth placing in Bled.

As the national coxless pair champions of 1968 Guest and Ramage were selected as Australia's pair entrants for the 1968 Summer Olympics and Guest was named captain of the Australian rowing squad. In the course of the semi-final, when leading the field a short distance from the finish, Ramage suffered acute oxygen loss from the high-altitude venue and they were overrun on the line. They missed the final and ultimately won their B final, in a time 6 seconds faster than the East Germans, who won the gold medal. Guest and Ramage finished in seventh place overall in the event.

Guest rowed on after his third Olympics and was back in the successful Victorian King's Cup eights of 1969 and 1970. For the 1970 World Rowing Championships in St Catharines, the Vic King's Cup eight provided the stern four and the three-seated Kerry Jelbart. The bow pair were from South Australia and Michael Morgan at three the sole New South Welshman. Guest held onto his five-seat and the eight rowed to a fifth-place finish in the final.

After retirement from the elite level Guest coached the 1975 Victorian men's eight to a third place in that year's King's Cup. In 2000, he was awarded the Australian Sports Medal and in 2011 inducted into the Victorian Rowing Hall of Fame. He served terms as President of the Banks Rowing Club and as Chairman of Rowing Australia Appeals Tribunal.

From 2009 to 2015, Guest rowed competitively at masters regattas in crews with David Ramage. At the 2015 World Rowing Masters Regatta, they won four gold medals.

Guest was the first 70-year-old to beat a seven-minute time for a 2000m ergo. In March 2015, Guest broke the world record for the 75–79 year age category at the World Indoor Rowing Championships in Boston, USA. In 2019, at age 80, he set a 2,000 meter indoor rowing world record (7:26.6) for his age category.

== Legal and judicial career ==
Guest began practising law in 1965 and was admitted to the Victorian Bar in 1969. He was appointed a Queen's Counsel in 1983. He had a general practice but specialised in family law and complex property disputes. Guest was appointed to the bench of the Family Court of Australia in 1998 and presided as a Family Court judge until 2008. At his retirement, the Chief Justice of the Family Court Diana Bryant was quoted as saying "[Guest] had brought the dedication and determination typical of an elite athlete to his work" and in reference to his 're Patrick' ruling, she said that his "sympathetic call for legislative reform to assist homo-nuclear families earned him respect in the gay community and showed him to be a modern thinker ahead of his time".

== Other activities and roles ==
On his retirement from the bench in 2008, he joined the board of the Lasallian Foundation, a human rights organisation that assists the development of impoverished communities in the Asia Pacific region.

=== Art collector ===
Guest was a collector of contemporary art and a member of the curatorial board of NotFair. He was a benefactor of the Bendigo Art Gallery, and in 2010, he founded the biennial Paul Guest Prize for drawing, worth A$15,000.

== Personal life and death ==
In 2008, he was a guest at the Taj Mahal Hotel in Mumbai during the 2008 Mumbai attacks. He was barricaded in his room during the incident and was led to safety afterwards by hotel staff.

Guest died in Melbourne on 15 March 2026, at the age of 87.

His brother Peter Guest was also an Australian Olympic rower who also rowed at the 1960 Summer Olympics.
