= Josip Bujas =

Croatian rower (1930–1976)

Personal information
- Nationality: Croatian
- Born: 8 March 1930; Šibenik, Yugoslavia
- Died: 8 April 1976 (aged 46); Šibenik, Yugoslavia

Sport
- Sport: Rowing

Josip Bujas (8 March 1930 – 8 April 1976) was a Croatian rower. He competed in the men's coxed pair event at the 1960 Summer Olympics.
