= Jens Berendt Jensen =

Danish rower (born 1940)

Personal information
- Nationality: Danish
- Born: 21 February 1940 (age 86) Faxe, Denmark

Sport
- Sport: Rowing

Jens Berendt Jensen (born 21 February 1940) is a Danish rower. He competed at the 1960 Summer Olympics and the 1964 Summer Olympics.
