= Paško Škarica =

Croatian rower

Personal information
- Nationality: Croatian
- Born: 11 May 1934 (age 90); Šibenik, Yugoslavia

Sport
- Sport: Rowing

Paško Škarica (born 11 May 1934) is a Croatian rower. He competed in the men's coxed pair event at the 1960 Summer Olympics.
