= Don Palmer (footballer) =

Australian rules footballer

Personal information
- Full name: Don Palmer
- Born: 3 October 1938
- Died: 28 September 2023 (aged 84)
- Original team: West Coburg
- Height: 179 cm (5 ft 10 in)
- Weight: 76 kg (168 lb)

Playing career^{1}
Years	Club	Games (Goals)
1959–64	North Melbourne	50 (23)
- ^{1} Playing statistics correct to the end of 1964.

Don Palmer (3 October 1938 – 28 September 2023) was an Australian rules footballer who played with North Melbourne in the Victorian Football League (VFL).
