= René Guissart (rower) =

French rower

Olympic medal record

Men's rowing
Bronze medal – third place	1956 Melbourne	Coxless four

René Jacques Guissart (12 September 1929 – 8 September 2014) was a French rower who competed in the 1952 Summer Olympics and in the 1956 Summer Olympics. In 1952 he and his partner Jean-Pierre Souche finished fifth in the coxless pair event. Four years later he won the bronze medal with the French boat in the coxless fours event.
