= Knud Nielsen (rower) =

Danish rower

Personal information
- Nationality: Danish
- Born: 26 June 1936; Faxe, Denmark
- Died: 9 May 2011 (aged 74)

Sport
- Sport: Rowing

Knud Nielsen (26 June 1936 – 9 May 2011) was a Danish rower. He competed at the 1960 Summer Olympics and the 1964 Summer Olympics.
