= Gustavo Pérez =

Uruguayan rower (1935–2012)

Personal information
- Born: 5 August 1935 Carmelo, Uruguay
- Died: 22 April 2012 (aged 76)

Sport
- Sport: Rowing

Gustavo Pérez (5 August 1935 – 22 April 2012) was a Uruguayan rower. He competed at the 1960 Summer Olympics and the 1964 Summer Olympics.
