= Rubén Etchebarne =

Uruguayan cyclist (born 1936)

Personal information
- Born: 8 September 1936 (age 90) Mercedes, Uruguay

Cycling career
- Sport: Cycling

Rubén Etchebarne (born 8 September 1936) is a former Uruguayan cyclist. He competed at the 1960 Summer Olympics and the 1964 Summer Olympics.
