= Luis Aguiar (rower) =

Uruguayan rower (born 1939)

Personal information
- Born: 10 December 1939; Carmelo, Uruguay
- Died: 27 July 2022 (aged 82)

Sport
- Sport: Rowing

Luis Aguiar (10 December 1939 – 27 July 2022) was a Uruguayan rower. He competed in the men's coxed pair event at the 1960 Summer Olympics.
