= Ioannis Symbonis =

Greek rower (born 1935)

Personal information
- Nationality: Greek
- Born: January 6, 1935 Tripoli, Greece
- Died: September 19, 2019 (aged 84)

Sport
- Sport: Rowing

Ioannis Symbonis (Greek: Ιωάννης Συμπόνης; January 6, 1935 - September 19, 2019) was a Greek rower. He competed in two events at the 1960 Summer Olympics.
