= Ioannis Theodorakeas =

Greek rower (born 1941)

Personal information
- Nationality: Greek
- Born: 26 March 1941 (age 84); Kalamata, Greece

Sport
- Sport: Rowing

Ioannis Theodorakeas (Greek: Ιωάννης Θεοδωρακέας; born 26 March 1941) is a Greek rower. He competed in two events at the 1960 Summer Olympics.
