= List of Olympic medalist families =

List of Olympic medalists families is a list of people grouped by family who are olympic medalists.

== Summer Olympics ==
=== Parent-Child ===
Family Gold Medal/ Total	Member (Gold/Silver/Bronze) Relationship	Olympics	Sports	Note
Bertinetti; 4 / 6	(Kingdom of Italy) Marcello Bertinetti (2/1/1)	1908 London, 1924 Paris, 1928 Amsterdam	Fencing - Team Sabre (1908, 1924), Team épée (1924, 1928)	
Bertinetti; 4 / 6	(Italy) Franco Bertinetti (2/0/0); Son	1952 Helsinki, 1956 Melbourne	Fencing - Team épée (1952, 1956)	
Konow; 2 / 4	(Norway) Magnus Konow (2/1/0)	1908 London, 1912 Stockholm, 1920 Antwerp, 1928 Amsterdam, 1936 Berlin, 1948 London	Sailing - 12 metre (1912), 8 metre (1920), 6 metre (1936)	
Konow; 2 / 4	(Norway) Karsten Konow (0/1/0); Son	1936 Berlin	Sailing - 6 metre (1936)	
Swahn; 6 / 15	(Sweden) Oscar Swahn (3/1/2)	1908 London, 1912 Stockholm, 1920 Antwerp	Shooting - Single-shot running deer (1908), Team single-shot running deer (1908), 100 m team running deer, single shots (1912), Double-shot running deer (1908), 100 m running deer, double shots (1912), 100 m team running deer, double shots (1920)	
Swahn; 6 / 15	(Sweden) Alfred Swahn (3/3/3); Son	1908 London, 1912 Stockholm, 1920 Antwerp, 1924 Paris	Shooting - Team running deer, single shots (1908), Running deer, single shots (1912, 1920), Team running deer, single shots (1912, 1920, 1924), Team clay pigeons (1924), Running deer, double shots (1924), Team running deer, double shots (1924)	
Beresford; 3 / 6	(United Kingdom) Julius Beresford (0/1/0)	1912 Stockholm	Rowing - Men's coxed four (1912)	
Beresford; 3 / 6	(United Kingdom) Jack Beresford (3/2/0); Son	1920 Antwerp, 1924 Paris, 1928 Amsterdam, 1932 Los Angeles, 1936 Berlin	Rowing - Men's single sculls (1920, 1924), Eight (1928), coxless four (1932), double sculls (1936)	
Hansen; 1 / 2	(Norway) Halfdan Hansen (1/0/0)	1912 Stockholm	Sailing - 12 metre (1912)	
Hansen; 1 / 2	(Norway) Børre Falkum-Hansen (0/1/0); Son	1952 Helsinki	Sailing - 5.5 metre (1952)	
von Blixen-Finecke; 2 / 3	(Sweden) Hans von Blixen-Finecke (0/0/1)	1912 Stockholm	Equestrian - Individual dressage (1912)	
von Blixen-Finecke; 2 / 3	(Sweden) Hans von Blixen-Finecke Jr. (2/0/0); Son	1952 Helsinki, 1956 Melbourne	Equestrian - Individual eventing (1952), Team eventing (1952)	
Cornellie; 2 / 2	(Belgium) Émile Cornellie (1/0/0)	1920 Antwerp	Sailing - 6 Metre (1920)	
Cornellie; 2 / 2	(Belgium) Florimond Cornellie (1/0/0); Son	1920 Antwerp	Sailing - 6 Metre (1920)	
Hin; 3 / 3	(Netherlands) Cornelis Hin (1/0/0)	1920 Antwerp	Sailing - 12' Dinghy (1920)	
Hin; 3 / 3	(Netherlands) Johan Hin (1/1/0); Son	1920 Antwerp	Sailing - 12' Dinghy (1920)	
Hin; 3 / 3	(Netherlands) Frans Hin (1/1/0); Son	1920 Antwerp	Sailing - 12' Dinghy (1920)	
Kelly; 3 / 4	(United States) John B. Kelly Sr. (3/0/0)	1920 Antwerp, 1924 Paris	Rowing - Single sculls (1920), double sculls (1920, 1924)	
Kelly; 3 / 4	(United States) John B. Kelly Jr. (0/0/1); Son	1956 Melbourne	Rowing - Single sculls (1956)	
Padou; 1 / 3	(France) Henri Padou (1/0/1)	1924 Paris, 1928 Amsterdam	Water Polo (1924, 1928)	
Padou; 1 / 3	(France) Henri Padou Jr. (0/0/1); Son	1948 London	Swimming - Men's 4 × 200 m freestyle (1948)	
Sandblom; 0 / 3	(Sweden) John Sandblom (0/0/1)	1928 Amsterdam	Sailing - 12 metre (1928)	
Sandblom; 0 / 3	(Sweden) Philip Sandblom (0/0/1); Son	1928 Amsterdam	Sailing - 12 metre (1928)	
Sandblom; 0 / 3	(Sweden) Carl Sandblom (0/0/1); Son	1928 Amsterdam	Sailing - 12 metre (1928)	
Villanueva; 0 / 2	(Philippines) José Villanueva (0/0/1)	1932 Los Angeles	Boxing - Men's bantamweight (1932)	
Villanueva; 0 / 2	(Philippines) Anthony Villanueva (0/1/0); Son	1964 Tokyo	Boxing - Men's featherweight (1964)	
Bóbis; 1 / 5	(Hungary) Gyula Bóbis (1/0/0)	1948 London	Wrestling - Men's freestyle heavyweight (1948)	
Bóbis; 1 / 5	(Hungary) Ildikó Farkasinszky-Bóbis (0/3/1); Daughter	1968 Mexico City, 1972 Munich, 1976 Montreal	Fencing - Women's team foil (1968, 1972, 1976), individual foil (1972)	
Kovács; 6 / 9	(Hungary) Pál Kovács (6/0/1)	1936 Berlin, 1948 London, 1952 Helsinki, 1956 Melbourne, 1960 Rome	Fencing - Team sabre (1936, 1948, 1952, 1956, 1960), Sabre individual (1948, 1952)	
Kovács; 6 / 9	(Hungary) Tamás Kovács (0/0/2); Son	1968 Mexico City, 1972 Munich, 1976 Montreal	Fencing - Team sabre (1968, 1972)	
de Cárdenas; 0 / 2	(Cuba) Carlos de Cárdenas (0/1/0)	1948 London	Sailing - Star (1948)	
de Cárdenas; 0 / 2	(Cuba) Carlos de Cárdenas Jr. (0/1/0); Son	1948 London	Sailing - Star (1948)	
Kruize; 0 / 3	(Netherlands) Roepie Kruize (0/1/1)	1948 London, 1952 Helsinki	Field Hockey (1948, 1952)	
Kruize; 0 / 3	(Netherlands) Hidde Kruize (0/0/1); Son	1988 Seoul	Field Hockey - Men's team (1988)	
Németh; 2 / 3	(Hungary) Imre Németh (1/0/1)	1948 London	Athletics - Hammer Throw (1948)	
Németh; 2 / 3	(Hungary) Miklós Németh (1/0/0); Son	1976 Montreal	Athletics - Javelin Throw (1976)	
Smart; 2 / 2	(United States) Paul Smart (1/0/0)	1948 London	Sailing - Star (1948)	
Smart; 2 / 2	(United States) Hilary Smart (1/0/0); Son	1948 London	Sailing - Star (1948)	
Szívós; 3 / 7	(Hungary) István Szívós (2/1/0)	1948 London, 1952 Helsinki, 1956 Melbourne	Water polo (1948, 1952, 1956)	
Szívós; 3 / 7	(Hungary) István Szívós (1/1/2); Son	1968 Mexico City, 1972 Munich, 1976 Montreal, 1980 Moscow	Water polo (1968, 1972, 1976, 1980)	
McCormick; 4 / 6	(United States) Pat McCormick (4/0/0)	1952 Helsinki, 1956 Melbourne	Diving - Women's 3m springboard (1952, 1956), 10m platform (1952, 1956)	
McCormick; 4 / 6	(United States) Kelly McCormick (0/1/1); Daughter	1984 Los Angeles, 1988 Seoul	Diving - Women's 3m springboard (1984, 1988)	
Azaryan; 4 / 5	(Soviet Union) Albert Azaryan (3/1/0)	1956 Melbourne, 1960 Rome	Gymnastics - Men's Team (1956, 1960), Rings (1956, 1960)	
Azaryan; 4 / 5	(Soviet Union) Eduard Azaryan (1/0/0); Son	1980 Moscow	Gymnastics - Men's Team (1980)	
D'Altrui; 2 / 2	(Italy) Giuseppe D'Altrui (1/0/0)	1956 Melbourne, 1960 Rome, 1964 Tokyo, 1972 Munich	Water Polo (1960)	
D'Altrui; 2 / 2	(Italy) Marco D'Altrui (1/0/0); Son	1984 Los Angeles, 1988 Seoul, 1992 Barcelona	Water Polo (1992)	
Jenkins; 3 / 3	(United States) Charles Jenkins Sr. (2/0/0)	1956 Melbourne	Athletics - 400 m (1956), 4 × 400 m relay (1956)	
Jenkins; 3 / 3	(United States) Charles Jenkins Jr. (1/0/0); Son	1992 Barcelona	Athletics - 4 × 400 m relay (1992)	
Linsenhoff; 3 / 6	(West Germany) Liselott Linsenhoff (2/2/1)	1956 Melbourne, 1968 Mexico City, 1972 Munich	Equestrian - Team dressage (1956, 1968, 1972), Individual dressage (1956, 1972)	
Linsenhoff; 3 / 6	(West Germany) Ann-Kathrin Linsenhoff (1/0/0); Daughter	1988 Seoul	Equestrian - Team dressage (1988)	
Klimke; 8 / 11	(West Germany) Reiner Klimke (6/0/2)	1960 Rome, 1964 Tokyo, 1968 Mexico City, 1976 Montreal, 1984 Los Angeles, 1988 Seoul	Equestrian - Team dressage (1964, 1968, 1976, 1984, 1988), Individual dressage (1968, 1976, 1984)	
Klimke; 8 / 11	(Germany) Ingrid Klimke (2/1/0); Daughter	2000 Sydney, 2004 Athens, 2008 Beijing, 2012 London, 2016 Rio de Janeiro	Equestrian - Team eventing (2008, 2012, 2016)	
Neckermann; 2 / 7	(West Germany) Josef Neckermann (2/2/2)	1960 Rome, 1964 Tokyo, 1968 Mexico City, 1972 Munich	Equestrian - Individual dressage (1960, 1968, 1972), Team dressage (1964, 1968, 1972)	
Neckermann; 2 / 7	(Canada) Eva Maria Pracht (0/0/1); Daughter	1984 Los Angeles, 1988 Seoul	Equestrian - Team dressage (1988)	
Roycroft; 1 / 5	(Australia) Bill Roycroft (1/0/2)	1960 Rome, 1964 Tokyo, 1968 Mexico City, 1972 Munich, 1976 Montreal	Equestrian - Team eventing (1960, 1968, 1976)	
Roycroft; 1 / 5	(Australia) Wayne Roycroft (0/0/2) Son	1968 Mexico City, 1976 Montreal, 1984 Los Angeles	Equestrian - Team eventing (1968, 1976)	
Usoz; 0 / 2	(Spain) Luis Usoz (0/0/1)	1960 Rome, 1964 Tokyo	Field Hockey (1960)	
Usoz; 0 / 2	(Spain) Pablo Usoz (0/1/0) Son	1992 Barcelona, 1996 Atlanta, 2000 Sydney	Field Hockey - Men's team (1996)	
Cagnotto; 0 / 6	(Italy) Giorgio Cagnotto (0/2/2)	1964 Tokyo, 1968 Mexico City, 1972 Munich, 1976 Montreal, 1980 Moscow	Diving - Men's 3m springboard (1972, 1976, 1980), 10m platform (1972)	
Cagnotto; 0 / 6	(Italy) Tania Cagnotto (0/1/1) Daughter	2000 Sydney, 2004 Athens, 2008 Beijing, 2012 London, 2016 Rio de Janeiro	Diving - Women's 3m springboard (2016), 3m springboard synchro (2016)	
Hall; 5 / 13	(United States) Gary Hall Sr. (0/2/1)	1968 Mexico City, 1972 Munich, 1976 Montreal	Swimming - 400m medley (1968), 200m butterfly (1972), 100m butterfly (1976)	
Hall; 5 / 13	(United States) Gary Hall Jr. (5/3/2) Son	1996 Atlanta, 2000 Sydney, 2004 Athens	Swimming - 50m freestyle (1996, 2000, 2004), 100m freestyle (1996, 2000), 4 x 100m freestyle (1996, 2000, 2004), 4 x 100m medley (1996, 2000)	
Miller; 1 / 3	(Jamaica) Lennox Miller (0/1/1)	1968 Mexico City, 1972 Munich	Athletics - Men's 100m (1968, 1972)	
Miller; 1 / 3	(United States) Inger Miller (1/0/0) Daughter	1996 Atlanta	Athletics - Women's 4 x 100m (1996)	
Rudisha; 2 / 3	(Kenya) Daniel Rudisha (0/1/0)	1968 Mexico City	Athletics - Men's 4 x 400m (1968)	
Rudisha; 2 / 3	(Kenya) David Rudisha (2/0/0) Son	2012 London, 2016 Rio de Janeiro	Athletics - Men's 800m (2012, 2016)	
Steinmetz; 3 / 4	(Hungary) János Steinmetz (0/0/1)	1968 Mexico City	Water Polo (1968)	
Steinmetz; 3 / 4	(Hungary) Barnabás Steinmetz (2/0/0); Son	2000 Sydney, 2004 Athens	Water Polo - Men's team (2000, 2004)	
Steinmetz; 3 / 4	(Hungary) Ádám Steinmetz (1/0/0); Son	2004 Athens, 2012 London	Water Polo - Men's team (2004)	
Tsukahara; 6 / 10	(Japan) Mitsuo Tsukahara (5/1/3)	1968 Mexico City, 1972 Munich, 1976 Montreal	Gymnastics - Men's Team (1968, 1972, 1976), Horizontal bar (1972, 1976), Rings (1972), All-around (1976), Vault (1976), Parallel bars (1976)	
Tsukahara; 6 / 10	(Japan) Naoya Tsukahara (1/0/0) Son	1996 Atlanta, 2000 Sydney, 2004 Athens	Gymnastics - Men's Team (2004)	
Ilyina / Petrova; 0 / 2	(Soviet Union) Nadezhda Ilyina (0/0/1)	1976 Montreal	Athletics - Women's 4 x 400m (1976)	
Ilyina / Petrova; 0 / 2	(Russia) Nadia Petrova (0/0/1); Daughter	2012 London	Tennis - Women's doubles (2012)	
Paes; 0 / 2	(India) Vece Paes (0/0/1)	1972 Munich	Field Hockey (1972)	
Paes; 0 / 2	(India) Leander Paes (0/0/1); Son	1996 Atlanta	Tennis - Singles (1996)	
Boisse; 3 / 4	(France) Philippe Boisse (2/1/0)	1976 Montreal, 1980 Moscow, 1984 Los Angeles	Fencing - Men's team épée (1980, 1984), Individual épée (1984)	
Boisse; 3 / 4	(France) Érik Boisse (1/0/0) Son	2004 Athens	Fencing - Men's team épée (2004)	
Łasko; 1 / 2	(Poland) Lech Łasko (1/0/0)	1976 Montreal, 1980 Moscow	Volleyball - Men's Team (1976)	
Łasko; 1 / 2	(Italy) Michał Łasko (0/0/1); Son	2012 London	Volleyball - Men's Team (2012)	
Mustafin; 2 / 8	(Soviet Union) Farhat Mustafin (0/0/1)	1976 Montreal	Wrestling - Greco Roman Bantamweight (1976)	
Mustafin; 2 / 8	(Russia) Aliya Mustafina (2/2/3); Daughter	2012 London, 2016 Rio de Janeiro	Gymnastics - Women's Team (2012, 2016), All-Around (2012, 2016), Uneven Bars (2012, 2016), Floor Exercise (2012)	
Zaytsev; 1 / 5	(Soviet Union) Vyacheslav Zaytsev (1/2/0)	1976 Montreal, 1980 Moscow, 1988 Seoul	Volleyball - Men's team (1976, 1980, 1988)	
Zaytsev; 1 / 5	(Italy) Ivan Zaytsev (0/1/1); Son	2012 London, 2016 Rio de Janeiro, 2020 Tokyo	Volleyball - Men's team (2012, 2016)	
Bezsonov; 0 / 3	(Soviet Union) Volodymyr Bezsonov (0/0/1)	1980 Moscow	Football (1980)	
Bezsonov; 0 / 3	(Ukraine) Anna Bessonova (0/0/2); Daughter	2004 Athens, 2008 Beijing	Rhythmic Gymnastics - Individual all-around (2004, 2008)	
Bykova / Zvonareva; 0 / 2	(Soviet Union) Natalia Bykova (0/0/1)	1980 Moscow	Field Hockey - Women's team (1980)	
Bykova / Zvonareva; 0 / 2	(Russia) Vera Zvonareva (0/0/1); Daughter	2008 Beijing, 2012 London	Tennis - Women's single (2008)	
Makarov; 0 / 3	(Soviet Union) Aleksandr Makarov (0/1/0)	1980 Moscow	Athletics - Men's javelin (1980)	
Makarov; 0 / 3	(Russia) Sergey Makarov (0/0/2); Son	1996 Atlanta, 2000 Sydney, 2004 Athens, 2008 Beijing	Athletics - Men's javelin (2000, 2004)	
Sukhoruchenkov / Zabelinskaya; 1 / 4	(Soviet Union) Sergei Sukhoruchenkov (1/0/0)	1980 Moscow	Cycling - Men's road race (1980)	
Sukhoruchenkov / Zabelinskaya; 1 / 4	(Russia) / (Uzbekistan) Olga Zabelinskaya (0/1/2); Daughter	2012 London, 2016 Rio de Janeiro	Cycling - Women's road race (2012), time trial (2012, 2016)	
Berkoff; 3 / 6	(United States) Dave Berkoff (2/1/1)	1984 Los Angeles, 1988 Seoul	Swimming - Men's 100m backstroke (1984, 1988), 4 x 100m medley (1984, 1988)	
Berkoff; 3 / 6	(United States) Katharine Berkoff (1/0/1); Daughter	2024 Paris	Swimming - Women's 100m backstroke (2024), 4 x 100m medley (2024)	
Buchan; 2 / 2	(United States) William Earl Buchan (1/0/0)	1984 Los Angeles	Sailing - Star class (1984)	
Buchan; 2 / 2	(United States) William Carl Buchan (1/0/0); Son	1984 Los Angeles	Sailing - Flying Dutchman (1984)	
Bukić; 2 / 4	(Socialist Federal Republic of Yugoslavia) / (Croatia) Perica Bukić (2/1/0)	1984 Los Angeles, 1988 Seoul, 1996 Atlanta	Water Polo (1984, 1988, 1996)	
Bukić; 2 / 4	(Croatia) Luka Bukić (0/1/0); Son	2016 Rio de Janeiro	Water Polo - Men's Team (2016)	
Carter; 1 / 2	(United States) Michael Carter (0/1/0)	1984 Los Angeles	Athletics - Men's shot put (1984)	
Carter; 1 / 2	(United States) Michelle Carter (1/0/0); Daughter	2016 Rio de Janeiro	Athletics - Women's shot put (2016)	
Conte; 0 / 2	(Argentina) Hugo Conte (0/0/1)	1988 Seoul	Volleyball - Men's team (1988)	
Conte; 0 / 2	(Argentina) Facundo Conte (0/0/1); Son	2020 Tokyo	Volleyball - Men's team (2020)	
Drüll / Sprink; 0 / 2	(West Germany) Elke Drüll (0/1/0)	1984 Los Angeles	Field Hockey - Women's team (1988)	
Drüll / Sprink; 0 / 2	(Germany) Annika Sprink (0/0/1); Daughter	2016 Rio de Janeiro	Field Hockey - Women's team (2016)	
Maksimović; 1 / 2	(Socialist Federal Republic of Yugoslavia) / (Serbia and Montenegro) Goran Maksimović (1/0/0)	1988 Seoul	Shooting - Men's 10m air rifle (1988)	
Maksimović; 1 / 2	(Serbia) Ivana Maksimović (0/1/0); Daughter	2012 London	Shooting - Women's 50m rifle three positions (2012)	
McGee; 2 / 2	(United States) Pamela McGee (1/0/0)	1984 Los Angeles	Basketball - Women's team (1984)	
McGee; 2 / 2	(United States) JaVale McGee (1/0/0); Son	2020 Tokyo	Basketball - Men's team (2020)	
Saito; 2 / 3	(Japan) Hitoshi Saito (2/0/0)	1984 Los Angeles, 1988 Seoul	Judo - Men's +95 kg (1984, 1988)	
Saito; 2 / 3	(Japan) Tatsuru Saito (0/1/0); Son	2024 Paris	Judo - Mixed team (2024)	
Sukno; 2 / 3	(Socialist Federal Republic of Yugoslavia) Goran Sukno (1/0/0)	1984 Los Angeles	Water Polo (1984)	
Sukno; 2 / 3	(Croatia) Sandro Sukno (1/1/0); Son	2012 London, 2016 Rio de Janeiro	Water Polo - Men's Team (2012, 2016)	
Brinkman; 3 / 4	(Netherlands) Jacques Brinkman (2/0/1)	1988 Seoul, 1996 Atlanta, 2000 Sydney	Field Hockey - Men's Team (1988, 1996, 2000)	
Brinkman; 3 / 4	(Netherlands) Thierry Brinkman (1/0/0); Son	2024 Paris	Field Hockey - Men's Team (2024)	
Csipes; 3 / 10	(Hungary) Ferenc Csipes (1/2/1)	1988 Seoul, 1992 Barcelona, 1996 Atlanta	Kayaking - K-4 1000 m (1988, 1992, 1996), K-2 500 m (1988)	
Csipes; 3 / 10	(Hungary) Tamara Csipes (2/3/1); Daughter	2016 Rio de Janeiro, 2020 Tokyo, 2024 Paris	Kayaking - K-4 500 m (2016, 2020, 2024), K-2 500m (2024), K-1 500 m (2020, 2024)	
Florijn; 4 / 5	(Netherlands) Ronald Florijn (2/0/0)	1988 Seoul, 1992 Barcelona, 1996 Atlanta	Rowing - Men's double scull (1988), eight (1996)	
Florijn; 4 / 5	(Netherlands) Karolien Florijn (1/1/0); Daughter	2020 Tokyo, 2024 Paris	Rowing - Women's coxless four (2020), single sculls (2024)	
Florijn; 4 / 5	(Netherlands) Finn Florijn (1/0/0); Son	2020 Tokyo, 2024 Paris	Rowing - Men's quadruple sculls (2024)	
Hegh Arntzen; 0 / 2	(Norway) Hanne Hegh (0/1/0)	1988 Seoul	Handball - Women's Team (1988)	
Hegh Arntzen; 0 / 2	(Norway) Emilie Hegh Arntzen (0/0/1); Daughter	2016 Rio de Janeiro	Handball - Women's Team (2016)	
Luikin; 3 / 9	(Soviet Union) Valeri Liukin (2/2/0)	1988 Seoul	Gymnastics - Men's Team (1988), All-Around (1988), Horizontal Bar (1988), Parallel Bars (1988)	
Luikin; 3 / 9	(United States) Nastia Liukin (1/3/1); Daughter	2008 Beijing	Gymnastics - Women's Team (2008), All-Around (2008), Uneven Bars (2008), Balance Beam (2008), Floor Exercise (2008)	
McIntyre; 2 / 2	(United Kingdom) Michael McIntyre (1/0/0)	1988 Seoul	Sailing - Star class (1988)	
McIntyre; 2 / 2	(United Kingdom) Eilidh McIntyre (1/0/0); Daughter	2020 Tokyo	Sailing - 470 class (2020)	
Nielsen; 0 / 2	(Denmark) Benny Nielsen (0/1/0)	1988 Seoul	Swimming - Men's 200m butterfly (1988)	
Nielsen; 0 / 2	(Denmark) Mie Nielsen (0/0/1); Daughter	2016 Rio de Janeiro	Swimming - Women's 4 x 100m medley (2016)	
Pankov; 1 / 3	(Soviet Union) / (Unified Team at the Olympics) Marina Pankova (1/1/0)	1988 Seoul, 1992 Barcelona	Volleyball - Women's team (1988, 1992)	
Pankov; 1 / 3	ROC Pavel Pankov (0/1/0); Son	2020 Tokyo	Volleyball - Men's team (2020)	
Nascimento; 1 / 2	(Brazil) Mazinho (0/1/0)	1988 Seoul	Football (1988)	
Nascimento; 1 / 2	(Brazil) Rafinha (1/0/0); Son	2016 Rio de Janeiro	Football - Men's team (2016)	
Dujshebaev; 1 / 6	(Unified Team at the Olympics) / (Spain) Talant Dujshebaev (1/0/2)	1992 Barcelona, 1996 Atlanta, 2000 Sydney	Handball - Men's team (1992, 1996, 2000)	
Dujshebaev; 1 / 6	(Spain) Alex Dujshebaev (0/0/2); Son	2020 Tokyo, 2024 Paris	Handball - Men's team (2020, 2024)	
Dujshebaev; 1 / 6	(Spain) Daniel Dujshebaev (0/0/1); Son	2024 Paris	Handball - Men's team (2024)	
Gil / Kim; 1 / 4	(South Korea) Gil Young-ah (1/1/1)	1992 Barcelona, 1996 Atlanta	Badminton - Women's doubles (1992, 1996), Mixed doubles (1996)	
Gil / Kim; 1 / 4	(South Korea) Kim Won-ho (0/1/0); Son	2024 Paris	Badminton - Mixed Doubles (2024)	
Gurriel; 2 / 3	(Cuba) Lourdes Gourriel (1/0/0)	1992 Barcelona	Baseball (1992)	
Gurriel; 2 / 3	(Cuba) Yuli Gurriel (1/1/0); Son	2004 Athens, 2008 Beijing	Baseball (2004, 2008)	
Kazanov; 0 / 2	(Bulgaria) Milko Kazanov (0/0/1)	1996 Atlanta	Canoeing - Men's K-2 1000m (1996)	
Kazanov; 0 / 2	(Bulgaria) Lyubomira Kazanova (0/0/1); Daughter	2016 Rio de Janeiro	Rhythmic Gymnastics - Group all-around (2016)	
Kudryavtsev; 0 / 2	(Unified Team at the Olympics) Aleksey Kudryavtsev (0/1/0)	1992 Barcelona	Swimming - Men's 4 × 200 m freestyle (1992)	
Kudryavtsev; 0 / 2	(Russia) Yana Kudryavtseva (0/1/0); Daughter	2016 Rio de Janeiro	Rhythmic Gymnastics - Individual all-around (2016)	
Lewis / Taylor; 0 / 4	(Australia) Hayley Lewis (0/1/1)	1992 Barcelona	Swimming - Women's 400m freestyle (1992), 800m freestyle (1992)	
Lewis / Taylor; 0 / 4	(Australia) Kai Taylor (0/1/1); Son	2024 Paris	Swimming - Men's 4 x 100m freestyle (2024), 4 x 200m freestyle (2024)	
Pozdnyakov; 6 / 7	(Unified Team at the Olympics) / (Russia) Stanislav Pozdnyakov (4/0/1)	1992 Barcelona, 1996 Atlanta, 2000 Sydney, 2004 Athens, 2008 Beijing	Fencing - Sabre individual (1996), Sabre team (1992, 1996, 2000, 2004)	
Pozdnyakov; 6 / 7	ROC Sofia Pozdniakova (2/0/0); Daughter	2020 Tokyo	Sabre individual (2020), Sabre team (2020)	
Collins; 0 / 3	(Australia) Danny Collins (0/1/1)	1996 Atlanta, 2000 Sydney	Canoeing - Men's K-2 500m (1996, 2000)	
Collins; 0 / 3	(Australia) Jackson Collins (0/1/0); Son	2024 Paris	Canoeing - Men's K-4 500m (2024)	
Fox; 4 / 8	(France) Myriam Fox-Jerusalmi (0/0/1)	1996 Atlanta	Canoeing - Women's K1 (1996)	
Fox; 4 / 8	(Australia) Jessica Fox (3/1/2); Daughter	2012 London, 2016 Rio de Janeiro, 2020 Tokyo, 2024 Paris	Canoeing - Women's K1 (2012, 2016, 2020, 2024), C1 (2020, 2024)	
Fox; 4 / 8	(Australia) Noemie Fox (1/0/0); Daughter	2024 Paris	Kayak Cross - Women's Slalom (2024)	
Veen; 3 / 3	(Netherlands) Stephan Veen (2/0/0)	1996 Atlanta, 2000 Sydney	Field Hockey - Men's team (1996, 2000)	
Veen; 3 / 3	(Netherlands) Marijn Veen (1/0/0); Daughter	2024 Paris	Field Hockey - Women's team (2024)	
Yeo; 0 / 2	(South Korea) Yeo Hong-chul (0/1/0)	1996 Atlanta	Gymnastics - Men's Vault (1996)	
Yeo; 0 / 2	(South Korea) Yeo Seo-jeong (0/0/1); Daughter	2020 Tokyo	Gymnastics - Women's Vault (2020)	
Alekna; 2 / 4	(Lithuania) Virgilijus Alekna (2/0/1)	2000 Sydney, 2004 Athens, 2008 Beijing	Athletics - Men's discus (2000, 2004, 2008)	
Alekna; 2 / 4	(Lithuania) Mykolas Alekna (0/1/0); Son	2024 Paris	Athletics - Men's discus (2024)	

=== Siblings ===
Family Gold Medal/ Total	Member (Gold/Silver/Bronze) Relationship	Olympics	Sports	Note
Paine; 2 / 3	(United States) Sumner Paine (1/1/0)	1896 Athens	Shooting - 30 m free pistol (1896), 25 m military pistol (1896)	
Paine; 2 / 3	(United States) John Paine (1/0/0); Brother	1896 Athens	Shooting - 25 m military pistol (1896)	
Doherty; 5 / 7	(United Kingdom) Reginald Doherty (3/0/1)	1900 Paris, 1908 London	Tennis - Men's Singles (1900), Men's Doubles (1900, 1908), Mixed Doubles (1900)	
Doherty; 5 / 7	(United Kingdom) Laurence Doherty (2/0/1); Brother	1900 Paris	Tennis - Men's Singles (1900), Men's Doubles (1900), Mixed Doubles (1900)	
Escandón; 0 / 3	(Mexico) Pablo de Escandón (0/0/1)	1900 Paris	Polo (1900)	
Escandón; 0 / 3	(Mexico) Manuel de Escandón (0/0/1); Brother	1900 Paris	Polo (1900)	
Escandón; 0 / 3	(Mexico) Eustaquio Escandón (0/0/1); Brother	1900 Paris	Polo (1900)	
Fickeisen; 2 / 3	(German Empire) Otto Fickeisen (1/0/1)	1900 Paris, 1912 Stockholm	Rowing - Men's coxed four (1900, 1912)	
Fickeisen; 2 / 3	(German Empire) Rudolf Fickeisen (1/0/0); Brother	1912 Stockholm	Rowing - Men's coxed four (1912)	
Goßler; 3 / 3	(German Empire) Oskar Goßler (1/0/0)	1900 Paris	Rowing – Men's coxed four (1900)	
Goßler; 3 / 3	(German Empire) Gustav Goßler (1/0/0); Brother	1900 Paris	Rowing – Men's coxed four (1900)	
Goßler; 3 / 3	(German Empire) Carl Goßler (1/0/0); Brother	1900 Paris	Rowing – Men's coxed four (1900)	
Lotsij; 0 / 2	(Netherlands) Geert Lotsij (0/1/0)	1900 Paris	Rowing – Men's coxed four (1900)	
Lotsij; 0 / 2	(Netherlands) Paul Lotsij (0/1/0); Brother	1900 Paris	Rowing – Men's coxed four (1900)	
Ludwig; 0 / 2	(German Empire) Erich Ludwig (0/1/0)	1900 Paris	Rugby union (1900)	
Ludwig; 0 / 2	(German Empire) Richard Ludwig (0/1/0); Brother	1900 Paris	Rugby union (1900)	
Whittindale; 0 / 2	(United Kingdom) Claude Whittindale (0/1/0)	1900 Paris	Rugby union (1900)	
Whittindale; 0 / 2	(United Kingdom) Raymond Whittindale (0/1/0); Brother	1900 Paris	Rugby union (1900)	
Bryant; 2 / 4	(United States) Wallace Bryant (0/0/1)	1904 St. Louis	Archery - Team round (1904)	
Bryant; 2 / 4	(United States) George Bryant (2/0/1); Brother	1904 St. Louis	Archery - Double York round (1904), Double American round (1904), Team round (1904)	
Cooke; 0 / 2	(United States) George Edwin Cooke (0/0/1)	1904 St. Louis	Football - (1904)	
Cooke; 0 / 2	(United States) Thomas Cooke (0/0/1); Brother	1904 St. Louis	Football - (1904)	
Jameson; 0 / 2	(United States) Henry Jameson (0/0/1)	1904 St. Louis	Football (1904)	
Jameson; 0 / 2	(United States) Claude Jameson (0/0/1); Brother	1904 St. Louis	Football (1904)	
January; 0 / 3	(United States) John January (0/1/0)	1904 St. Louis	Football (1904)	
January; 0 / 3	(United States) Thomas January (0/1/0); Brother	1904 St. Louis	Football (1904)	
January; 0 / 3	(United States) Charles January (0/1/0); Brother	1904 St. Louis	Football (1904)	
Passmore; 0 / 2	(United States) William T. Passmore (0/1/0)	1904 St. Louis	Lacrosse (1904)	
Passmore; 0 / 2	(United States) George Passmore (0/1/0); Brother	1904 St. Louis	Lacrosse (1904)	
Stickney; 0 / 2	(United States) Stuart Stickney (0/1/0)	1904 St. Louis	Golf - Team (1904)	
Stickney; 0 / 2	(United States) William Stickney (0/1/0); Brother	1904 St. Louis	Golf - Team (1904)	
Wear; 0 / 2	(United States) Joseph Wear (0/0/1)	1904 St. Louis	Tennis - Men's Doubles (1904)	
Wear; 0 / 2	(United States) Arthur Wear (0/0/1); Brother	1904 St. Louis	Tennis - Men's Doubles (1904)	
Andersson; 0 / 4	(Sweden) Robert Andersson (0/1/2)	1908 London, 1912 Stockholm, 1920 Antwerp	Water polo (1908, 1912, 1920)	
Andersson; 0 / 4	(Sweden) Erik Andersson (0/0/1); Brother	1920 Antwerp, 1924 Paris	Water polo (1920)	
Anspach; 3 / 6	(Belgium) Paul Anspach (2/2/1)	1908 London, 1912 Stockholm, 1920 Antwerp, 1924 Paris	Fencing - Individual épée (1912), Team épée (1908, 1912, 1920, 1924)	
Anspach; 3 / 6	(Belgium) Henri Anspach (1/0/0); Brother	1912 Stockholm	Fencing - Team épée (1912)	
Carlberg; 5 / 12	(Sweden) Vilhelm Carlberg (3/4/0)	1908 London, 1912 Stockholm, 1924 Paris	Shooting - Team small-bore rifle (1908), Team 30 m military pistol (1912), 25 m small-bore rifle (1912), Team 25 m small-bore rifle (1912), Team 50 m military pistol (1912), Team 50 m small-bore rifle (1912), 25 m rapid fire pistol (1924)	
Carlberg; 5 / 12	(Sweden) Eric Carlberg (2/3/0); Twin-brother	1908 London, 1912 Stockholm	Shooting - Team small-bore rifle (1908), Team 30 m military pistol (1912), Team 25 m small-bore rifle (1912), Team 50 m small-bore rifle (1912), Team 50 m military pistol (1912)	
Dod; 1 / 2	(United Kingdom) William Dod (1/0/0)	1908 London	Archery - Double York round (1908)	
Dod; 1 / 2	(United Kingdom) Lottie Dod (0/1/0); Sister	1908 London	Archery - Double National round (1908)	
Huybrechts; 1 / 4	(Belgium) Louis Huybrechts (0/1/0)	1908 London	Sailing - 6 metres (1908)	
Huybrechts; 1 / 4	(Belgium) Léon Huybrechts (1/2/0); Brother	1908 London, 1920 Antwerp, 1924 Paris, 1928 Amsterdam	Sailing - 6 metres (1908, 1920), Monotype (1924)	
Holmberg; 4 / 4	(Sweden) Oswald Holmberg (2/0/0)	1908 London, 1912 Stockholm	Gymnastics – Men's team (1908), Men's team, Swedish system (1912)	
Holmberg; 4 / 4	(Sweden) Carl Holmberg (1/0/0); Brother	1908 London	Gymnastics – Men's team (1908)	
Holmberg; 4 / 4	(Sweden) Arvid Holmberg (1/0/0); Brother	1908 London	Gymnastics – Men's team (1908)	
Miller; 2 / 2	(United Kingdom) George Arthur Miller (1/0/0)	1908 London	Polo (1908)	
Miller; 2 / 2	(United Kingdom) Charles Darley Miller (1/0/0); Brother	1908 London	Polo (1908)	
Norling; 5 / 5	(Sweden) Axel Norling (2/0/0)	1908 London, 1912 Stockholm	Gymnastics – Men's team (1908), Men's team, Swedish system (1912)	
Norling; 5 / 5	(Sweden) Daniel Norling (3/0/0); Brother	1908 London, 1912 Stockholm, 1920 Antwerp	Gymnastics – Men's team (1908), Men's team, Swedish system (1912); Equestrian – Team jumping (1920)	
Peterson; 0 / 2	(United Kingdom) Jack Peterson (0/1/0)	1908 London	Field hockey (1908)	
Peterson; 0 / 2	(United Kingdom) Walter Peterson (0/1/0); Brother	1908 London	Field hockey (1908)	
Potts; 0 / 2	(United Kingdom) Edward Potts (0/0/1)	1908 London, 1912 Stockholm	Gymnastics - Men's team (1912)	
Potts; 0 / 2	(United Kingdom) Reginald Potts (0/0/1); Brother	1912 Stockholm	Gymnastics - Men's team (1912)	
Solomon; 0 / 2	(United Kingdom) Barney Solomon (0/1/0)	1908 London	Rugby union (1908)	
Solomon; 0 / 2	(United Kingdom) Bert Solomon (0/1/0); Brother	1908 London	Rugby union (1908)	
Sörvik; 2 / 2	(Sweden) Birger Sörvik (1/0/0)	1908 London	Gymnastics – Men's team (1908)	
Sörvik; 2 / 2	(Sweden) Haakon Sörvik (1/0/0); Brother	1908 London	Gymnastics – Men's team (1908)	
Tønsager; 0 / 2	(Norway) Ejnar Tønsager (0/0/1)	1908 London, 1912 Stockholm	Rowing - Men's coxed four (1912)	
Tønsager; 0 / 2	(Norway) Håkon Tønsager (0/0/1); Brother	1912 Stockholm	Rowing - Men's coxed four (1912)	
Bartholomae; 0 / 2	(German Empire) Willi Bartholomae (0/0/1)	1912 Stockholm	Rowing - Men's eight (1912)	
Bartholomae; 0 / 2	(German Empire) Fritz Bartholomae (0/0/1); Brother	1912 Stockholm	Rowing - Men's eight (1912)	
Bergström; 0 / 2	(Sweden) Dick Bergström (0/1/0)	1912 Stockholm	Sailing - 12 m class (1912)	
Bergström; 0 / 2	(Sweden) Kurt Bergström (0/1/0); Brother	1912 Stockholm	Sailing - 12 m class (1912)	
de Laval; 0 / 3	(Sweden) Georg de Laval (0/1/1)	1912 Stockholm	Modern Pentathlon (1912); Shooting - 50m team pistol (1912)	
de Laval; 0 / 3	(Sweden) Erik de Laval (0/1/0); Brother	1912 Stockholm, 1920 Antwerp	Modern Pentathlon (1920)	
Goeldel; 0 / 3	(German Empire) Alfred Goeldel (0/1/1)	1912 Stockholm	Shooting - Men's trap (1912), Men's team trap (1912)	
Goeldel; 0 / 3	(German Empire) Horst Goeldel (0/0/1); Brother	1912 Stockholm	Shooting - Men's team trap (1912)	
Kahanamoku; 3 / 6	(United States) Duke Kahanamoku (3/2/0)	1912 Stockholm, 1920 Antwerp, 1924 Paris	Swimming - Men's 100m freestyle (1912, 1920, 1924), Men's 4 × 200 m freestyle (1912, 1920)	
Kahanamoku; 3 / 6	(United States) Samuel Kahanamoku (0/0/1); Brother	1924 Paris	Swimming - Men's 100m freestyle (1924)	
Lie; 2 / 2	(Norway) Alf Lie (1/0/0)	1912 Stockholm	Gymnastics – Men's team, free system (1912)	
Lie; 2 / 2	(Norway) Rolf Lie (1/1/0); Brother	1912 Stockholm	Gymnastics – Men's team, free system (1912)	
Mangiante; 3 / 3	(Kingdom of Italy) Lorenzo Mangiante (2/0/0)	1912 Stockholm, 1920 Antwerp	Gymnastics – Men's team (1908, 1920)	
Mangiante; 3 / 3	(Kingdom of Italy) Giovanni Mangiante (1/0/0); Brother	1912 Stockholm	Gymnastics – Men's team (1912)	
Nadi; 9 / 10	(Kingdom of Italy) Nedo Nadi (6/0/0)	1912 Stockholm, 1920 Antwerp	Fencing - Foil individual (1912, 1920), Sabre individual (1920), Foil team (1920), Épée team (1920), Sabre team (1920)	
Nadi; 9 / 10	(Kingdom of Italy) Aldo Nadi (3/1/0); Brother	1920 Antwerp	Fencing - Foil team (1920), Épée team (1920), Sabre team (1920), Individual sabre (1920)	
Opdahl; 2 / 3	(Norway) Nils Opdahl (1/0/0)	1912 Stockholm	Gymnastics – Men's team, free system (1912)	
Opdahl; 2 / 3	(Norway) Jacob Opdahl (1/1/0); Brother	1912 Stockholm, 1920 Antwerp	Gymnastics – Men's team, free system (1912, 1920)	
Thorstensen; 2 / 2	(Norway) Thomas Thorstensen (1/0/0)	1912 Stockholm	Gymnastics – Men's team, free system (1912)	
Thorstensen; 2 / 2	(Norway) Gabriel Thorstensen (1/1/0); Brother	1912 Stockholm	Gymnastics – Men's team, free system (1912)	
Thubé; 3 / 3	(France) Gaston Thubé (1/0/0)	1912 Stockholm	Sailing - 6 m class (1912)	
Thubé; 3 / 3	(France) Jacques Thubé (1/0/0); Brother	1912 Stockholm	Sailing - 6 m class (1912)	
Thubé; 3 / 3	(France) Amédée Thubé (1/0/0); Brother	1912 Stockholm	Sailing - 6 m class (1912)	
Westermark; 0 / 2	(Sweden) Herbert Westermark (0/1/0)	1912 Stockholm	Sailing - 8 m class (1912)	
Westermark; 0 / 2	(Sweden) Nils Westermark (0/1/0); Brother	1912 Stockholm	Sailing - 8 m class (1912)	
Birkeland; 2 / 2	(Norway) Rasmus Birkeland (1/0/0)	1920 Antwerp	Sailing - 12 metres (1920)	
Birkeland; 2 / 2	(Norway) Halvor Birkeland (1/0/0); Brother	1920 Antwerp	Sailing - 12 metres (1920)	
Blach; 0 / 2	(Denmark) Niels Blach (0/1/0)	1920 Antwerp	Field hockey (1920)	
Blach; 0 / 2	(Denmark) Ejvind Blach (0/1/0); Brother	1920 Antwerp	Field hockey (1920)	
Blitz; 0 / 6	(Belgium) Maurice Blitz (0/2/0)	1920 Antwerp, 1924 Paris	Water polo (1920, 1924)	
Blitz; 0 / 6	(Belgium) Gérard Blitz (0/2/2); Brother	1920 Antwerp, 1924 Paris, 1936 Berlin	Water polo (1920, 1924, 1936) & Swimming - 100 m backstroke (1920)	
Carp; 2 / 3	(Netherlands) Joop Carp (1/0/1)	1920 Antwerp, 1924 Paris	Sailing - 6.5 Metre (1920), 6 Metre (1924)	
Carp; 2 / 3	(Netherlands) Berend Carp (1/1/0); Brother	1920 Antwerp	Sailing - 6.5 Metre (1920)	
Costigliolo; 2 / 2	(Kingdom of Italy) Luigi Costigliolo (1/0/0)	1920 Antwerp	Gymnastics – Men's team (1920)	
Costigliolo; 2 / 2	(Kingdom of Italy) Carlo Costigliolo (1/0/0); Brother	1920 Antwerp	Gymnastics – Men's team (1920)	
de Figueroa; 0 / 2	(Spain) Álvaro de Figueroa (0/1/0)	1920 Antwerp	Polo (1920)	
de Figueroa; 0 / 2	(Spain) José de Figueroa (0/1/0); Brother	1920 Antwerp	Polo (1920)	
Federschmidt; 0 / 2	(United States) Franz Federschmidt (0/1/0)	1920 Antwerp	Rowing - Coxed four (1920)	
Federschmidt; 0 / 2	(United States) Erich Federschmidt (0/1/0); Brother	1920 Antwerp	Rowing - Coxed four (1920)	
Fitz-James Stuart; 0 / 2	(Spain) Jacobo Fitz-James Stuart (0/1/0)	1920 Antwerp	Polo (1920)	
Fitz-James Stuart; 0 / 2	(Spain) Hernando Fitz-James Stuart (0/1/0); Brother	1920 Antwerp	Polo (1920)	
Holm; 3 / 5	(Sweden) Yngve Holm (1/0/0)	1920 Antwerp	Sailing - 40m² Skerry cruiser (1920)	
Holm; 3 / 5	(Sweden) Tore Holm (2/0/2); Brother	1920 Antwerp, 1928 Amsterdam, 1932 Los Angeles, 1936 Berlin, 1948 London	Sailing - 40m² Skerry cruiser (1920), 8 metre (1928), 6 metre (1932, 1948)	
McCormick; 0 / 2	(United States) Joseph McCormick (0/1/0)	1920 Antwerp	Ice hockey (1920)	
McCormick; 0 / 2	(United States) Lawrence McCormick (0/1/0); Brother	1920 Antwerp	Ice hockey (1920)	
Ørvig; 3 / 3	(Norway) Olaf Ørvig (1/0/0)	1920 Antwerp	Sailing - 12 metres (1920)	
Ørvig; 3 / 3	(Norway) Thor Ørvig (1/0/0); Brother	1920 Antwerp	Sailing - 12 metres (1920)	
Ørvig; 3 / 3	(Norway) Erik Ørvig (1/0/0); Brother	1920 Antwerp	Sailing - 12 metres (1920)	
Østervold; 4 / 4	(Norway) Ole Østervold (1/0/0)	1920 Antwerp	Sailing - 12 metres (1920)	
Østervold; 4 / 4	(Norway) Jan Østervold (1/0/0); Brother	1920 Antwerp	Sailing - 12 metres (1920)	
Østervold; 4 / 4	(Norway) Henrik Østervold (1/0/0); Brother	1920 Antwerp	Sailing - 12 metres (1920)	
Østervold; 4 / 4	(Norway) Kristian Østervold (1/0/0); Brother	1920 Antwerp	Sailing - 12 metres (1920)	
Rudolf; 2 / 2	(Switzerland) Max Rudolf (1/0/0)	1920 Antwerp	Rowing - Coxed four (1920)	
Rudolf; 2 / 2	(Switzerland) Paul Rudolf (1/0/0); Brother	1920 Antwerp	Rowing - Coxed four (1920)	
Slater; 2 / 4	(United States) Norman Slater (1/0/0)	1924 Paris	Rugby union (1924)	
Slater; 2 / 4	(United States) Colby Slater (2/0/0); Brother	1920 Antwerp, 1924 Paris	Rugby union (1920, 1924)	
van Loon; 0 / 2	(Netherlands) Antonius van Loon (0/1/0)	1920 Antwerp	Tug of war (1920)	
van Loon; 0 / 2	(Netherlands) Willem van Loon (0/1/0); Brother	1920 Antwerp	Tug of war (1920)	
van Rekum; 0 / 2	(Netherlands) Marinus van Rekum (0/1/0)	1920 Antwerp	Tug of war (1920)	
van Rekum; 0 / 2	(Netherlands) Willem van Rekum (0/1/0); Brother	1920 Antwerp	Tug of war (1920)	
Borg; 1 / 6	(Sweden) Åke Borg (0/0/1)	1924 Paris	Swimming - Men's 4x200 m freestyle relay (1924)	
Borg; 1 / 6	(Sweden) Arne Borg (1/2/2); Twin brother	1924 Paris, 1928 Amsterdam	Swimming - Men's 400 m freestyle (1924, 1928), Men's 1500 m freestyle (1924, 1928) Men's 4x200 m freestyle relay (1924)	
Katalinić; 0 / 3	(Kingdom of Italy) Šimun Katalinić (0/0/1)	1924 Paris	Rowing - Men's eight (1924)	
Katalinić; 0 / 3	(Kingdom of Italy) Frane Katalinić (0/0/1); Brother	1924 Paris	Rowing - Men's eight (1924)	
Katalinić; 0 / 3	(Kingdom of Italy) Ante Katalinić (0/0/1); Brother	1924 Paris	Rowing - Men's eight (1924)	
Sfetescu; 2 / 4	(Romania) Mircea Sfetescu (0/0/1)	1924 Paris	Rugby union (1924)	
Sfetescu; 2 / 4	(Romania) Eugen Sfetescu (0/0/1); Brother	1924 Paris	Rugby union (1924)	
Urdinarán; 3 / 3	(Uruguay) Antonio Urdinarán (1/0/0)	1924 Paris	Football (1924)	
Urdinarán; 3 / 3	(Uruguay) Santos Urdinarán (2/0/0); Brother	1928 Amsterdam, 1928 Amsterdam	Football (1924, 1928)	
Wyld; 0 / 4	(United Kingdom) Harry Wyld (0/0/2)	1924 Paris, 1928 Amsterdam	Cycling - Men's 50 kilometres (1924), Men's team pursuit (1928)	
Wyld; 0 / 4	(United Kingdom) Lew Wyld (0/0/1); Brother	1928 Amsterdam	Cycling - Men's team pursuit (1928)	
Wyld; 0 / 4	(United Kingdom) Percy Wyld (0/0/1); Brother	1928 Amsterdam	Cycling - Men's team pursuit (1928)	
Faehlmann; 0 / 2	(Estonia) Georg Faehlmann (0/0/1)	1928 Amsterdam	Sailing - 6 metre (1928)	
Faehlmann; 0 / 2	(Estonia) Andreas Faehlmann (0/0/1); Brother	1928 Amsterdam	Sailing - 6 metre (1928)	
Keserű; 2 / 4	(Hungary) Ferenc Keserű (1/1/0)	1928 Amsterdam, 1932 Los Angeles	Water Polo (1928, 1932)	
Keserű; 2 / 4	(Hungary) Alajos Keserű (1/1/0); Brother	1928 Amsterdam, 1932 Los Angeles	Water Polo (1928, 1932)	
Lucchetti; 0 / 2	(Argentina) Luis Lucchetti (0/0/1)	1928 Amsterdam	Fencing - Team foil (1928)	
Lucchetti; 0 / 2	(Argentina) Héctor Lucchetti (0/0/1); Brother	1928 Amsterdam	Fencing - Team foil (1928)	
Marcelle; 0 / 2	(France) Armand Marcelle (0/1/0)	1928 Amsterdam	Rowing - Coxed pair (1928)	
Marcelle; 0 / 2	(France) Édouard Marcelle (0/1/0); Brother	1928 Amsterdam	Rowing - Coxed pair (1928)	
March; 2 / 3	(Germany) / (Nazi Germany) Werner March (1/1/0)	1928 Amsterdam, 1936 Berlin	Art - Town planning (1936), Architecture (1936)	
March; 2 / 3	(Nazi Germany) Walter March (1/0/0); Brother	1936 Berlin	Art - Town planning (1936)	
Rademacher; 2 / 5	(Germany) Erich Rademacher (1/2/0)	1928 Amsterdam, 1932 Los Angeles	Water polo (1928, 1932); Swimming - Men's 200m breaststroke (1928)	
Rademacher; 2 / 5	(Germany) Joachim Rademacher (0/1/0); Brother	1928 Amsterdam, 1932 Los Angeles	Water polo (1928, 1932)	
Schöchlin; 2 / 2	(Switzerland) Hans Schöchlin (1/0/0)	1928 Amsterdam	Rowing - Coxed pair (1928)	
Schöchlin; 2 / 2	(Switzerland) Karl Schöchlin (1/0/0); Brother	1928 Amsterdam	Rowing - Coxed pair (1928)	
Kalili; 0 / 2	(United States) Maiola Kalili (0/1/0)	1932 Los Angeles	Swimming - Men's 4 × 200 m freestyle (1932)	
Kalili; 0 / 2	(United States) Manuella Kalili (0/1/0); Brother	1932 Los Angeles	Swimming - Men's 4 × 200 m freestyle (1932)	
Brown; 1 / 3	(United Kingdom) Godfrey Brown (1/1/0)	1936 Berlin	Athletics - Men's 400 meters (1936), 4x400 meters (1936)	
Brown; 1 / 3	(United Kingdom) Audrey Brown (0/1/0); Sister	1936 Berlin	Athletics - Women's 4 x 100 meters (1936)	
de Looper; 0 / 2	(Netherlands) Henk de Looper (0/0/1)	1936 Berlin	Field hockey (1936)	
de Looper; 0 / 2	(Netherlands) Jan de Looper (0/0/1); Brother	1936 Berlin	Field hockey (1936)	
Ditlev-Simonsen; 0 / 2	(Norway) Olaf Ditlev-Simonsen (0/1/0)	1936 Berlin	Sailing - 8 metre (1936)	
Ditlev-Simonsen; 0 / 2	(Norway) John Ditlev-Simonsen (0/1/0); Brother	1936 Berlin	Sailing - 8 metre (1936)	
Homberger; 0 / 4	(Switzerland) Hans Homberger (0/1/1)	1936 Berlin	Rowing - Coxed four (1936), Coxless four (1936)	
Homberger; 0 / 4	(Switzerland) Alex Homberger (0/1/1); Brother	1936 Berlin	Rowing - Coxed four (1936), Coxless four (1936)	
Wijdekop; 0 / 2	(Netherlands) Piet Wijdekop (0/0/1)	1936 Berlin	Canoeing - Folding K-2 10000m (1936)	
Wijdekop; 0 / 2	(Netherlands) Kees Wijdekop (0/0/1); Brother	1936 Berlin	Canoeing - Folding K-2 10000m (1936)	
Bello; 0 / 2	(Portugal) Duarte Manuel Bello (0/1/0)	1948 London	Sailing - Swallow (1948)	
Bello; 0 / 2	(Portugal) Fernando Bello (0/1/0); Brother	1948 London	Sailing - Swallow (1948)	
Berntsen; 1 / 5	(Norway) Ole Berntsen (1/1/1)	1948 London, 1956 Melbourne, 1964 Tokyo	Sailing - Dragon (1948, 1956, 1964)	
Berntsen; 1 / 5	(Norway) William Berntsen (0/1/1); Brother	1948 London, 1960 Rome	Sailing - Dragon (1948), 5.5 Metre (1960)	
D'Inzeo; 1 / 12	(Italy) Piero D'Inzeo (1/1/1)	1956 Melbourne, 1960 Rome, 1964 Tokyo, 1972 Munich	Equestrian - Individual jumping (1956, 1960), Team jumping (1956, 1960, 1964, 1972)	
D'Inzeo; 1 / 12	(Italy) Raimondo D'Inzeo (0/1/1); Brother	1956 Melbourne, 1960 Rome, 1964 Tokyo, 1972 Munich	Equestrian - Individual jumping (1956, 1960), Team jumping (1956, 1960, 1964, 1972)	
Monssen; 0 / 2	(Norway) Sigurd Monssen (0/0/1)	1948 London	Rowing - Eight (1948)	
Monssen; 0 / 2	(Norway) Carl Monssen (0/0/1); Brother	1948 London	Rowing - Eight (1948)	
Nordahl; 3 / 3	(Sweden) Bertil Nordahl (1/0/0)	1948 London	Football (1948)	
Nordahl; 3 / 3	(Sweden) Knut Nordahl (1/0/0); Brother	1948 London	Football (1948)	
Nordahl; 3 / 3	(Sweden) Gunnar Nordahl (1/0/0); Brother	1948 London	Football (1948)	
Novák; 2 / 5	(Hungary) Éva Novák-Gerard (1/2/1)	1948 London, 1952 Helsinki	Swimming - 400 m freestyle (1952), 200 m breaststroke (1948, 1952), 4×100 m freestyle (1952)	
Novák; 2 / 5	(Hungary) Ilona Novák (1/0/0); Sister	1952 Helsinki	Swimming - 4×100 m freestyle (1952)	
Pandolfini; 2 / 2	(Italy) Tullio Pandolfini (1/0/0)	1948 London	Water Polo (1948)	
Pandolfini; 2 / 2	(Italy) Gianfranco Pandolfini (1/0/0); Brother	1948 London	Water Polo (1948)	
Turner; 2 / 2	(United States) Ian Turner (1/0/0)	1948 London	Rowing - Eight (1948)	
Turner; 2 / 2	(United States) David Turner (1/0/0); Brother	1948 London	Rowing - Eight (1948)	
McKinlay; 0 / 2	(United States) Art McKinlay (0/1/0)	1956 Melbourne	Rowing - Coxless four (1956)	
McKinlay; 0 / 2	(United States) John McKinlay (0/1/0); Twin-brother	1956 Melbourne	Rowing - Coxless four (1956)	
Nonn; 0 / 2	(Germany) Helmut Nonn (0/0/1)	1956 Melbourne	Field hockey (1956)	
Nonn; 0 / 2	(Germany) Wolfgang Nonn (0/0/1); Brother	1956 Melbourne	Field hockey (1956)	
Pearce; 0 / 5	(Australia) Eric Pearce (0/1/1)	1956 Melbourne, 1960 Rome, 1964 Tokyo, 1968 Mexico City	Field Hockey (1964, 1968)	
Pearce; 0 / 5	(Australia) Gordon Pearce (0/1/0); Brother	1956 Melbourne, 1960 Rome, 1968 Mexico City	Field Hockey (1968)	
Pearce; 0 / 5	(Australia) Julian Pearce (0/1/1); Brother	1960 Rome, 1964 Tokyo, 1968 Mexico City	Field Hockey (1964, 1968)	
Quina; 0 / 2	(Portugal) Mário Quina (0/1/0)	1956 Melbourne, 1960 Rome, 1968 Mexico City, 1972 Munich	Sailing - Star (1960)	
Quina; 0 / 2	(Portugal) José Manuel Quina (0/1/0); Brother	1960 Rome, 1968 Mexico City, 1972 Munich	Sailing - Star (1960)	
Brodin; 0 / 2	(France) Claude Brodin (0/0/1)	1960 Rome, 1964 Tokyo	Fencing - Men's team épée (1964)	
Brodin; 0 / 2	(France) Jacques Brodin (0/0/1); Brother	1964 Tokyo, 1972 Munich	Fencing - Men's team épée (1964)	
Carminucci; 0 / 3	(Italy) Pasquale Carminucci (0/0/1)	1960 Rome, 1964 Tokyo, 1968 Mexico City	Gymnastics - Men's Team (1960)	
Carminucci; 0 / 3	(Italy) Giovanni Carminucci (0/1/1); Brother	1960 Rome, 1964 Tokyo, 1968 Mexico City	Gymnastics - Men's Team (1960), Parallel Bars (1960)	
Konrád; 2 / 6	(Hungary) János Konrád (1/0/2)	1960 Rome, 1964 Tokyo, 1968 Mexico City	Water polo (1960, 1964, 1968)	
Konrád; 2 / 6	(Hungary) Ferenc Konrád (1/1/1); Brother	1968 Mexico City, 1972 Munich, 1976 Montreal	Water polo (1968, 1972, 1976)	
Konrads; 1 / 4	(Australia) John Konrads (1/0/2)	1960 Rome	Swimming - 400m freestyle (1960), 1500m freestyle (1960), 4 × 200 m freestyle (1960)	
Konrads; 1 / 4	(Australia) Ilsa Konrads (0/1/0); Sister	1960 Rome	Swimming - 4 x 100m freestyle (1960)	
Press; 5 / 6	(Soviet Union) Tamara Press (3/1/0)	1960 Rome, 1964 Tokyo	Shot put (1960, 1964), Discus (1960, 1964)	
Press; 5 / 6	(Soviet Union) Irina Press (2/0/0) Sister	1960 Rome, 1964 Tokyo	80 metre hurdles (1960), Pentathlon (1964)	
Schockemöhle; 2 / 6	(West Germany) Alwin Schockemöhle (2/1/1)	1960 Rome, 1968 Mexico City, 1976 Montreal	Equestrian - Team jumping (1960, 1968, 1976), Individual jumping (1976)	
Schockemöhle; 2 / 6	(West Germany) Paul Schockemöhle (0/1/1) Brother	1976 Montreal, 1984 Los Angeles	Equestrian - Team jumping (1976, 1984)	
Amlong; 2 / 2	(United States) Thomas Amlong (1/0/0)	1964 Tokyo	Rowing - Eight (1964)	
Amlong; 2 / 2	(United States) Joseph Amlong (1/0/0) Brother	1964 Tokyo	Rowing - Eight (1964)	
Petterson; 0 / 7	(Sweden) Gösta Pettersson (0/1/1)	1964 Tokyo, 1968 Mexico City	Cycling - Time trial, team (1964, 1968)	
Petterson; 0 / 7	(Sweden) Sture Pettersson (0/1/1); Brother	1964 Tokyo, 1968 Mexico City	Cycling - Time trial, team (1964, 1968)	
Petterson; 0 / 7	(Sweden) Erik Pettersson (0/1/1); Brother	1964 Tokyo, 1968 Mexico City	Cycling - Time trial, team (1964, 1968)	
Petterson; 0 / 7	(Sweden) Tomas Pettersson (0/1/0); Brother	1968 Mexico City	Cycling - Time trial, team (1968)	
Török; 2 / 4	(Hungary) Ferenc Török (2/0/1)	1964 Tokyo, 1968 Mexico City	Modern Pentathlon - Individual (1964), Team (1964, 1968)	
Török; 2 / 4	(Hungary) Ottó Török (0/0/1) Brother	1964 Tokyo	Modern Pentathlon - Team (1964)	
Anderson; 2 / 2	(Australia) Tom Anderson (1/0/0)	1972 Munich	Sailing - Dragon (1972)	
Anderson; 2 / 2	(Australia) John Anderson (1/0/0) Twin-brother	1972 Munich	Sailing - Star (1972)	
De Magistris; 0 / 2	(Italy) Gianni De Magistris (0/1/0)	1968 Mexico City, 1972 Munich, 1976 Montreal, 1980 Moscow, 1984 Los Angeles	Water Polo (1976)	
De Magistris; 0 / 2	(Italy) Riccardo De Magistris (0/1/0) Brother	1976 Montreal	Water Polo (1976)	
Katō; 9 / 14	(Japan) Takeshi Katō (1/0/1)	1968 Mexico City	Gymnastics - Men's Team (1968), Floor Exercise (1968)	
Katō; 9 / 14	(Japan) Sawao Katō (8/3/1) Brother	1968 Mexico City, 1972 Munich, 1976 Montreal	Gymnastics - Men's Team (1968, 1972, 1976), All-around (1968, 1972, 1976), Horizontal Bar (1972), Parallel Bars (1972, 1976), Rings (1968), Pommel Horse (1972), Floor Exercise (1968)	
Livingston; 0 / 2	(United States) Cleve Livingston (0/1/0)	1968 Mexico City, 1972 Munich	Rowing - Eight (1972)	
Livingston; 0 / 2	(United States) Mike Livingston (0/1/0) Brother	1968 Mexico City, 1972 Munich	Rowing - Eight (1972)	
Maister; 2 / 2	(New Zealand) Selwyn Maister (1/0/0)	1968 Mexico City, 1972 Munich, 1976 Montreal	Field Hockey (1976)	
Maister; 2 / 2	(New Zealand) Barry Maister (1/0/0) Brother	1968 Mexico City, 1972 Munich, 1976 Montreal	Field Hockey (1976)	
Sundelin; 3 / 3	(Sweden) Ulf Sundelin (1/0/0)	1968 Mexico City, 1972 Munich	Sailing - 5.5 metre (1968)	
Sundelin; 3 / 3	(Sweden) Jörgen Sundelin (1/0/0) Brother	1968 Mexico City, 1972 Munich, 1976 Montreal	Sailing - 5.5 metre (1968)	
Sundelin; 3 / 3	(Sweden) Peter Sundelin (1/0/0) Brother	1968 Mexico City, 1972 Munich, 1976 Montreal, 1980 Moscow	Sailing - 5.5 metre (1968)	
Svojanovský; 0 / 4	(Czechoslovakia) Pavel Svojanovský (0/1/1)	1968 Mexico City, 1972 Munich, 1976 Montreal	Rowing - Coxed Pair (1972, 1976)	
Svojanovský; 0 / 4	(Czechoslovakia) Oldřich Svojanovský (0/1/1) Brother	1968 Mexico City, 1972 Munich, 1976 Montreal	Rowing - Coxed Pair (1972, 1976)	
Akimov; 2 / 2	(Soviet Union) Anatoly Akimov (1/0/0)	1972 Munich	Water Polo (1972)	
Akimov; 2 / 2	(Soviet Union) Vladimir Ivanovich Akimov (1/0/0); Brother	1980 Moscow	Water Polo (1980)	
Hansen; 2 / 4	(Norway) Frank Hansen (1/1/0)	1972 Munich, 1976 Montreal	Rowing - Double sculls (1972, 1976)	
Hansen; 2 / 4	(Norway) Alf Hansen (1/1/0); Brother	1972 Munich, 1976 Montreal, 1984 Los Angeles, 1988 Seoul	Rowing - Double sculls (1976), Quad sculls (1988)	
Budnikov; 0 / 2	(Soviet Union) Boris Budnikov (0/1/0)	1972 Munich, 1976 Montreal, 1980 Moscow	Sailing - Soling (1980)	
Budnikov; 0 / 2	(Soviet Union) Aleksandr Budnikov (0/1/0); Brother	1980 Moscow	Sailing - Soling (1980)	
Landvoigt; 4 / 6	(East Germany) Bernd Landvoigt (2/0/1)	1972 Munich, 1976 Montreal, 1980 Moscow	Rowing - Eights (1972), Coxless pair (1976, 1980)	
Landvoigt; 4 / 6	(East Germany) Jörg Landvoigt (2/0/1); Twin-brother	1972 Munich, 1976 Montreal, 1980 Moscow	Rowing - Eights (1972), Coxless pair (1976, 1980)	
Olry; 0 / 2	(France) Jean-Louis Olry (0/0/1)	1972 Munich	Canoeing - Men's slalom C-2 (1972)	
Olry; 0 / 2	(France) Jean-Claude Olry (0/0/1); Brother	1972 Munich	Canoeing - Men's slalom C-2 (1972)	
Pajot; 0 / 2	(France) Yves Pajot (0/1/0)	1972 Munich, 1976 Montreal	Sailing - Flying Dutchman (1972)	
Pajot; 0 / 2	(France) Marc Pajot (0/1/0); Brother	1972 Munich, 1976 Montreal	Sailing - Flying Dutchman (1972)	
Patel; 2 / 2	(New Zealand) Mohan Patel (1/0/0)	1976 Montreal	Field Hockey (1976)	
Patel; 2 / 2	(New Zealand) Ramesh Patel (1/0/0) Brother	1972 Munich, 1976 Montreal, 1984 Los Angeles	Field Hockey (1976)	
Cabot; 0 / 2	(Spain) Ricardo Cabot (0/1/0)	1976 Montreal, 1980 Moscow, 1984 Los Angeles	Field Hockey - Men's team (1980)	
Cabot; 0 / 2	(Spain) Javier Cabot (0/1/0) Brother	1980 Moscow, 1984 Los Angeles	Field Hockey - Men's team (1980)	
Dießner; 2 / 4	(East Germany) Ullrich Dießner (1/1/0)	1976 Montreal, 1980 Moscow	Rowing - Men's coxed four (1976, 1980)	
Dießner; 2 / 4	(East Germany) Walter Dießner (1/1/0); Twin-brother	1976 Montreal, 1980 Moscow	Rowing - Men's coxed four (1976, 1980)	
Diesch; 2 / 2	(West Germany) Jörg Diesch (1/0/0)	1976 Montreal, 1984 Los Angeles	Sailing - Flying Dutchman (1976)	
Diesch; 2 / 2	(West Germany) Eckart Diesch (1/0/0); Brother	1976 Montreal, 1984 Los Angeles	Sailing - Flying Dutchman (1976)	
Doreste; 3 / 3	(Spain) Luis Doreste (2/0/0)	1976 Montreal, 1984 Los Angeles, 1992 Barcelona	Sailing - 470 class (1984), Flying Dutchman class (1992)	
Doreste; 3 / 3	(Spain) José Doreste (1/0/0); Brother	1988 Seoul	Sailing - Finn class (1988)	
Roman; 1 / 3	(Italy) Federico Roman (1/1/0)	1976 Montreal, 1980 Moscow, 1984 Los Angeles	Equestrian - Individual eventing (1980), Team eventing (1980)	
Roman; 1 / 3	(Italy) Mauro Roman (0/1/0); Brother	1980 Moscow	Equestrian - Team eventing (1980)	
Tóth Harsányi; 0 / 2	(Hungary) Borbála Tóth Harsányi (0/0/1)	1976 Montreal	Handball - Women's team (1976)	
Tóth Harsányi; 0 / 2	(Hungary) Katalin Laki (0/0/1); Sister	1976 Montreal	Handball - Women's team (1976)	
Trinquet; 2 / 4	(France) Véronique Trinquet (0/0/1)	1976 Montreal	Fencing - Women's team foil (1976)	
Trinquet; 2 / 4	(France) Pascale Trinquet (2/0/1); Sister	1980 Moscow, 1984 Los Angeles	Fencing - Women's individual foil (1980), Team foil (1980, 1984)	
Abbagnale; 7 / 9	(Italy) Giuseppe Abbagnale (2/1/0)	1980 Moscow, 1984 Los Angeles, 1988 Seoul, 1992 Barcelona	Rowing - Men's Coxed Pairs (1984, 1988, 1992)	
Abbagnale; 7 / 9	(Italy) Carmine Abbagnale (2/1/0); Brother	1984 Los Angeles, 1988 Seoul, 1992 Barcelona, 1996 Atlanta	Rowing - Men's Coxed Pairs (1984, 1988, 1992)	
Abbagnale; 7 / 9	(Italy) Agostino Abbagnale (3/0/0); Brother	1988 Seoul, 1996 Atlanta, 2000 Sydney	Rowing - Men's Quad Sculls (1988, 2000), Double Sculls (1996)	
Barré; 0 / 2	(France) Pascal Barré (0/0/1)	1980 Moscow	Athletics - Men's 4 x 100m relay (1980)	
Barré; 0 / 2	(France) Patrick Barré (0/0/1); Twin-brother	1980 Moscow, 1984 Los Angeles	Athletics - Men's 4 x 100m relay (1980)	
Chick / Robertson; 2 / 2	(Zimbabwe) Sandra Chick (1/0/0)	1980 Moscow	Field Hockey - Women's team (1980)	
Chick / Robertson; 2 / 2	(Zimbabwe) Sonia Robertson (1/0/0); Twin-sister	1980 Moscow	Field Hockey - Women's team (1980)	
Detre; 0 / 2	(Hungary) Szabolcs Detre (0/0/1)	1980 Moscow	Sailing - Flying Dutchman (1980)	
Detre; 0 / 2	(Hungary) Zsolt Detre (0/0/1); Twin-brother	1980 Moscow	Sailing - Flying Dutchman (1980)	
Hellemans; 0 / 4	(Netherlands) Greet Hellemans (0/1/1)	1980 Moscow, 1984 Los Angeles	Rowing - Women's Double Sculls (1984), Women's Eight (1984)	
Hellemans; 0 / 4	(Netherlands) Nicolette Hellemans (0/1/1); Sister	1984 Los Angeles	Rowing - Women's Double Sculls (1984), Women's Eight (1984)	
Krišjānis; 0 / 2	(Soviet Union) Dzintars Krišjānis (0/1/0)	1980 Moscow	Rowing - Coxed Four (1980)	
Krišjānis; 0 / 2	(Soviet Union) Dimants Krišjānis (0/1/0); Brother	1980 Moscow	Rowing - Coxed Four (1980)	
López-Zubero; 1 / 2	(Spain) David López-Zubero (0/0/1)	1980 Moscow	Swimming - 100 m Butterfly (1980)	
López-Zubero; 1 / 2	(Spain) Martín López-Zubero (1/0/0); Brother	1992 Barcelona	Swimming - 200 m Backstroke (1992)	
Pimenov; 0 / 2	(Soviet Union) Nikolay Pimenov (0/1/0)	1980 Moscow	Rowing - Coxless pair (1980)	
Pimenov; 0 / 2	(Soviet Union) Yuri Pimenov (0/1/0); Twin-brother	1980 Moscow	Rowing - Coxless pair (1980)	
Pleshakov; 0 / 2	(Soviet Union) / (Unified Team at the Olympics) Sergei Pleshakov (0/1/0)	1980 Moscow, 1988 Seoul, 1992 Barcelona	Field Hockey- Men's team (1980)	
Pleshakov; 0 / 2	(Soviet Union) / (Unified Team at the Olympics) Vladimir Pleshakov (0/1/0); Twin-brother	1980 Moscow, 1988 Seoul, 1992 Barcelona	Field Hockey- Men's team (1980)	
Banach; 2 / 2	(United States) Ed Banach (1/0/0)	1984 Los Angeles	Wrestling - Freestyle 90 kg (1984)	
Banach; 2 / 2	(United States) Lou Banach (1/0/0); Brother	1984 Los Angeles	Wrestling - Freestyle 100 kg (1984)	
Benninga; 1 / 3	(Netherlands) Marc Benninga (0/0/1)	1988 Seoul	Field Hockey - Men's team (1988)	
Benninga; 1 / 3	(Netherlands) Carina Benninga (1/0/1); Sister	1984 Los Angeles, 1988 Seoul, 1992 Barcelona	Field Hockey - Women's team (1984, 1988)	
Brinkmann; 0 / 3	(West Germany) Dirk Brinkmann (0/2/0)	1984 Los Angeles, 1988 Seoul	Field Hockey - Men's team (1984, 1988)	
Brinkmann; 0 / 3	(West Germany) Thomas Brinkmann (0/1/0); Brother	1988 Seoul	Field Hockey - Men's team (1988)	
Campbell; 0 / 3	(United States) Peter Campbell (0/2/0)	1984 Los Angeles, 1988 Seoul	Water Polo (1984, 1988)	
Campbell; 0 / 3	(United States) Jeffrey Campbell (0/1/0); Brother	1988 Seoul, 1992 Barcelona	Water Polo (1988)	
Evans; 2 / 2	(Canada) J. Michael Evans (1/0/0)	1984 Los Angeles	Rowing - Men's Eight (1984)	
Evans; 2 / 2	(Canada) Mark Evans (1/0/0); Brother	1984 Los Angeles	Rowing - Men's Eight (1984)	
Grabow; 0 / 2	(West Germany) Volker Grabow (0/0/1)	1988 Seoul	Rowing - Men's Coxless Four (1988)	
Grabow; 0 / 2	(West Germany) Guido Grabow (0/0/1); Brother	1988 Seoul	Rowing - Men's Coxless Four (1988)	
McKee; 1 / 4	(United States) Jonathan McKee (1/0/1)	1984 Los Angeles, 2000 Sydney	Sailing - Flying Dutchman (1984), 49er (2000)	
McKee; 1 / 4	(United States) Charles McKee (0/0/2); Brother	1988 Seoul, 2000 Sydney	Sailing - Men's 470 (1988), 49er (2000)	
Miller; 2 / 2	(United States) Cheryl Miller (1/0/0)	1984 Los Angeles	Basketball - Women's Team (1984)	
Miller; 2 / 2	(United States) Reggie Miller (1/0/0); Brother	1996 Atlanta	Basketball - Men's Team (1996)	
Mugoša; 2 / 2	(Socialist Federal Republic of Yugoslavia) Ljiljana Mugoša (1/0/0)	1984 Los Angeles	Handball - Women's Team (1984)	
Mugoša; 2 / 2	(Socialist Federal Republic of Yugoslavia) Svetlana Mugoša (1/0/0); Sister	1984 Los Angeles	Handball - Women's Team (1984)	
Roth; 0 / 2	(West Germany) Michael Roth (0/1/0)	1984 Los Angeles	Handball - Men's Team (1984)	
Roth; 0 / 2	(West Germany) Ulrich Roth (0/1/0); Twin-brother	1984 Los Angeles	Handball - Men's Team (1984)	
Schultz; 2 / 2	(United States) Dave Schultz (1/0/0)	1984 Los Angeles	Wrestling - Freestyle 74 kg (1984)	
Schultz; 2 / 2	(United States) Mark Schultz (1/0/0); Brother	1984 Los Angeles, 1988 Seoul	Wrestling - Freestyle 82 kg (1984)	
Whitaker; 0 / 2	(United Kingdom) John Whitaker (0/1/0)	1984 Los Angeles	Equestrian - Team jumping (1984)	
Whitaker; 0 / 2	(United Kingdom) Michael Whitaker (0/1/0); Brother	1984 Los Angeles	Equestrian - Team jumping (1984)	
Josephson; 2 / 4	(United States) Karen Josephson (1/1/0)	1988 Seoul, 1992 Barcelona	Synchronized Swimming - Duet (1988, 1992)	
Josephson; 2 / 4	(United States) Sarah Josephson (1/1/0); Twin-sister	1988 Seoul, 1992 Barcelona	Synchronized Swimming - Duet (1988, 1992)	
Khadem; 1 / 4	(Iran) Amir Reza Khadem (0/0/2)	1992 Barcelona, 1996 Atlanta	Wrestling - Men's freestyle 74 kg (1992), 82 kg (1996)	
Khadem; 1 / 4	(Iran) Rasoul Khadem (1/0/1); Brother	1992 Barcelona, 1996 Atlanta	Wrestling - Men's freestyle 82 kg (1992), 90 kg (1996)	
Muis; 0 / 2	(Netherlands) Marianne Muis (0/0/1)	1988 Seoul	Swimming - Women's 4 x 100m freestyle (1988)	
Muis; 0 / 2	(Netherlands) Mildred Muis (0/0/1); Twin-sister	1988 Seoul	Swimming - Women's 4 x 100m freestyle (1988)	
Poll; 1 / 4	(Costa Rica) Silvia Poll (0/1/0)	1988 Seoul	Swimming - 200 m Freestyle (1988)	
Poll; 1 / 4	(Costa Rica) Claudia Poll (1/0/2); Sister	1996 Atlanta, 2000 Sydney	Swimming - 200 m Freestyle (1996, 2000), 400 m Freestyle (2000)	
Porzio; 2 / 2	(Italy) Franco Porzio (1/0/0)	1992 Barcelona	Water Polo (1992)	
Porzio; 2 / 2	(Italy) Giuseppe Porzio (1/0/0); Brother	1992 Barcelona	Water Polo (1992)	
Sánchez Vicario; 0 / 5	(Spain) Emilio Sánchez (0/1/0)	1988 Seoul	Tennis - Doubles (1988)	
Sánchez Vicario; 0 / 5	(Spain) Arantxa Sánchez Vicario (0/2/2); Sister	1992 Barcelona, 1996 Atlanta	Tennis - Doubles (1992, 1996), Singles (1992, 1996)	
Tõniste; 0 / 4	(Soviet Union) / (Estonia) Tõnu Tõniste (0/1/1)	1988 Seoul, 1992 Barcelona	Sailing - Men's 470 Class (1988, 1992)	
Tõniste; 0 / 4	(Soviet Union) / (Estonia) Toomas Tõniste (0/1/1); Twin-brother	1988 Seoul, 1992 Barcelona	Sailing - Men's 470 Class (1988, 1992)	
Zikarsky; 0 / 3	(Germany) Bengt Zikarsky (0/0/2)	1992 Barcelona, 1996 Atlanta	Swimming - Men's 4 x 100m freestyle (1992, 1996)	
Zikarsky; 0 / 3	(Germany) Björn Zikarsky (0/0/1); Twin-brother	1996 Atlanta	Swimming - Men's 4 x 100m freestyle (1996)	
Arnau; 0 / 2	(Spain) Jordi Arnau (0/1/0)	1996 Atlanta	Field Hockey - Men's team (1996)	
Arnau; 0 / 2	(Spain) Javier Arnau (0/1/0); Brother	1996 Atlanta	Field Hockey - Men's team (1996)	
Elmer; 0 / 3	(Australia) Lachlan Elmer (0/1/1)	1992 Barcelona, 1996 Atlanta	Field Hockey - Men's team (1992, 1996)	
Elmer; 0 / 3	(Australia) James Elmer (0/0/1); Brother	2000 Sydney	Field Hockey - Men's team (2000)	
Li; 2 / 7	(China) Li Dashuang (0/1/0)	1992 Barcelona	Gymnastics - Men's Team (1992)	
Li; 2 / 7	(China) Li Xiaoshuang (2/3/1); Twin-brother	1992 Barcelona, 1996 Atlanta	Gymnastics - Men's Team (1992, 1996), Floor (1992, 1996), Rings (1992), All-around (1996)	
Luz; 0 / 3	(Brazil) Helen Luz (0/0/1)	2000 Sydney	Basketball - Women's team (2000)	
Luz; 0 / 3	(Brazil) Silvia Luz (0/1/1); Sister	1996 Atlanta, 2000 Sydney	Basketball - Women's team (1996, 2000)	
Samuel; 1 / 3	(Brazil) Adriana Samuel (0/1/1)	1996 Atlanta, 2000 Sydney	Volleyball - Women's beach (1996, 2000)	
Samuel; 1 / 3	(Brazil) Alexandre Samuel (1/0/0); Brother	1992 Barcelona, 1996 Atlanta, 2000 Sydney	Volleyball - Men's team (1992)	
Searle; 2 / 5	(United Kingdom) Jonny Searle (1/0/1)	1992 Barcelona, 1996 Atlanta	Rowing - Coxed pair (1992), Coxless four (1996)	
Searle; 2 / 5	(United Kingdom) Greg Searle (1/0/2); Brother	1992 Barcelona, 1996 Atlanta, 2012 London	Rowing - Coxed pair (1992), Coxless four (1996), Eight (2012)	
Sidek; 0 / 3	(Malaysia) Razif Sidek (0/0/1)	1992 Barcelona	Badminton - Men's Doubles (1992)	
Sidek; 0 / 3	(Malaysia) Jalani Sidek (0/0/1); Brother	1992 Barcelona	Badminton - Men's Doubles (1992)	
Sidek; 0 / 3	(Malaysia) Rashid Sidek (0/0/1); Brother	1996 Atlanta	Badminton - Men's Singles (1996)	
Sobral; 0 / 3	(Brazil) Marta Sobral (0/1/1)	1996 Atlanta, 2000 Sydney	Basketball - Women's team (1996, 2000)	
Sobral; 0 / 3	(Brazil) Leila Sobral (0/1/0); Sister	1996 Atlanta	Basketball - Women's team (1996)	
Tewes; 2 / 2	(Germany) Stefan Tewes (1/0/0)	1992 Barcelona	Field Hockey - Men's team (1992)	
Tewes; 2 / 2	(Germany) Jan-Peter Tewes (1/0/0); Brother	1992 Barcelona	Field Hockey - Men's team (1992)	
Vía Dufresne; 1 / 3	(Spain) Natalia Vía Dufresne (0/2/0)	1992 Barcelona, 2004 Athens	Sailing - Europe class (1992), 470 class (2004)	
Vía Dufresne; 1 / 3	(Spain) Begoña Vía Dufresne (1/0/0); Sister	1996 Atlanta	Sailing - 470 class (1996)	
Velasco; 0 / 2	(Philippines) Roel Velasco (0/0/1)	1992 Barcelona	Boxing - Men's light flyweight (1992)	
Velasco; 0 / 2	(Philippines) Mansueto Velasco (0/1/0); Brother	1996 Atlanta	Boxing - Men's light flyweight (1996)	
Vilagos; 0 / 2	(Canada) Penny Vilagos (0/1/0)	1992 Barcelona	Synchronized Swimming - Duet (1992)	
Vilagos; 0 / 2	(Canada) Vicky Vilagos (0/1/0); Twin-sister	1992 Barcelona	Synchronized Swimming - Duet (1992)	
Babayaro; 2 / 2	(Nigeria) Emmanuel Babayaro (1/0/0)	1996 Atlanta	Football - Men's team (1996)	
Babayaro; 2 / 2	(Nigeria) Celestine Babayaro (1/0/0); Brother	1996 Atlanta	Football - Men's team (1996)	
Boxx; 4 / 4	(United States) Gillian Boxx (1/0/0)	1996 Atlanta	Softball (1996)	
Boxx; 4 / 4	(United States) Shannon Boxx (3/0/0); Sister	2004 Athens, 2008 Beijing, 2012 London	Football - Women's team (2004, 2008, 2012)	
Brands; 1 / 2	(United States) Terry Brands (0/0/1)	2000 Sydney	Wrestling - Freestyle 58 kg (2000)	
Brands; 1 / 2	(United States) Tom Brands (1/0/0); Twin-brother	1996 Atlanta	Wrestling - Freestyle 62 kg (1996)	
Calcaterra; 0 / 2	(Italy) Roberto Calcaterra (0/0/1)	1996 Atlanta	Water Polo (1996)	
Calcaterra; 0 / 2	(Italy) Alessandro Calcaterra (0/0/1); Brother	1996 Atlanta	Water Polo (1996)	
Duyster; 1 / 2	(Netherlands) Jeroen Duyster (1/0/0)	1996 Atlanta	Rowing - Men's eight (1996)	
Duyster; 1 / 2	(Netherlands) Willemijn Duyster (0/0/1); Sister	1996 Atlanta	Field Hockey - Women's team (1996)	
Estanguet; 3 / 4	(France) Patrice Estanguet (0/0/1)	1996 Atlanta	Canoeing - Men's C1 (1996)	
Estanguet; 3 / 4	(France) Tony Estanguet (3/0/0); Brother	2000 Sydney, 2004 Athens, 2012 London	Canoeing - Men's C1 (2000, 2004, 2012)	
Grbić; 2 / 4	(Serbia and Montenegro) Vladimir Grbić (1/0/1)	1996 Atlanta, 2000 Sydney	Volleyball - Men's team (1996, 2000)	
Grbić; 2 / 4	(Serbia and Montenegro) / (Serbia) Nikola Grbić (1/0/1); Brother	1996 Atlanta, 2000 Sydney	Volleyball - Men's team (1996, 2000)	
Nakamura; 1 / 2	(Japan) Yukimasa Nakamura (0/1/0)	1996 Atlanta	Judo - Men's 65 kg (1996)	
Nakamura; 1 / 2	(Japan) Kenzo Nakamura (1/0/0); Brother	1996 Atlanta	Judo - Men's 71 kg (1996)	
Nymark Andersen; 0 / 2	(Norway) Anne Nymark Andersen (0/0/1)	1996 Atlanta	Football - Women's team (1996)	
Nymark Andersen; 0 / 2	(Norway) Nina Nymark Andersen (0/0/1); Twin-sister	1996 Atlanta	Football - Women's team (1996)	
Saitiev; 4 / 4	(Russia) Buvaisar Saitiev (3/0/0)	1996 Atlanta, 2004 Athens, 2008 Beijing	Wrestling - Men's freestyle 74 kg (1996, 2004, 2008)	
Saitiev; 4 / 4	(Russia) Adam Saitiev (1/0/0); Brother	2000 Sydney	Wrestling - Men's freestyle 85 kg (2000)	
Simion; 0 / 3	(Romania) Marian Simion (0/1/1)	1996 Atlanta, 2000 Sydney	Boxing - Welterweight (1996), Light middleweight (2000)	
Simion; 0 / 3	(Romania) Dorel Simion (0/0/1); Brother	2000 Sydney	Boxing - Welterweight (2000)	
Touya; 2 / 4	(France) Gaël Touya (1/0/0)	2004 Athens	Fencing - Men's team sabre (2004)	
Touya; 2 / 4	(France) Damien Touya (1/1/1); Brother	1996 Atlanta, 2000 Sydney, 2004 Athens	Fencing - Men's individual sabre (1996), Team sabre (2000, 2004)	
Žukauskas; 0 / 3	(Lithuania) Eurelijus Žukauskas (0/0/2)	1996 Atlanta, 2000 Sydney	Basketball - Men's team (1996, 2000)	
Žukauskas; 0 / 3	(Lithuania) Mindaugas Žukauskas (0/0/1); Brother	1996 Atlanta	Basketball - Men's team (1996)	
Taymazov; 2 / 4	(Unified Team at the Olympics) / (Ukraine) Timur Taymazov (1/1/0)	1992 Barcelona, 1996 Atlanta	Weightlifting (1992, 1996)	
Taymazov; 2 / 4	(Uzbekistan) Artur Taymazov (1/1/0); Brother	2000 Sydney, 2004 Athens, 2008 Beijing, 2012 London	Wrestling (2000, 2004)	
Batten; 0 / 2	(United Kingdom) Miriam Batten (0/1/0)	2000 Sydney	Rowing - Quadruple sculls (2000)	
Batten; 0 / 2	(United Kingdom) Guin Batten (0/1/0); Sister	2000 Sydney	Rowing - Quadruple sculls (2000)	
Dobroskok; 0 / 2	(Russia) Aleksandr Dobroskok (0/1/0)	2000 Sydney	Diving - Men's 3m springboard synchro (2000)	
Dobroskok; 0 / 2	(Russia) Dmitry Dobroskok (0/0/1); Brother	2008 Beijing	Diving - Men's 10m platform synchro (2008)	
Hochschorner; 6 / 8	(Slovakia) Pavol Hochschorner (3/0/1)	2000 Sydney, 2004 Athens, 2008 Beijing, 2012 London	Canoeing- C-2 (2000, 2004, 2008, 2012)	
Hochschorner; 6 / 8	(Slovakia) Peter Hochschorner (3/0/1); Twin-brother	2000 Sydney, 2004 Athens, 2008 Beijing, 2012 London	Canoeing- C-2 (2000, 2004, 2008, 2012)	
Hamm; 1 / 4	(United States) Paul Hamm (1/2/0)	2004 Athens	Gymnastics - Men's Team (2004), All-Around (2004), High bar (2004)	
Hamm; 1 / 4	(United States) Morgan Hamm (0/1/0); Twin-brother	2004 Athens	Gymnastics - Men's Team (2004)	
López; 2 / 5	(United States) Steven López (2/0/1)	2000 Sydney, 2004 Athens, 2008 Beijing	Taekwondo - 68 kg (2000), 81 kg (2004, 2008)	
López; 2 / 5	(United States) Mark López (0/1/0); Brother	2008 Beijing	Taekwondo - 68 kg (2008)	
López; 2 / 5	(United States) Diana López (0/0/1); Sister	2008 Beijing	Taekwondo - 57 kg (2008)	
Smabers; 1 / 4	(Netherlands) Hanneke Smabers (0/0/1)	2000 Sydney	Field Hockey - Women's team (2000)	
Smabers; 1 / 4	(Netherlands) Minke Smeets (1/1/1); Sister	2000 Sydney, 2004 Athens, 2008 Beijing	Field Hockey - Women's team (2000, 2004, 2008)	
Williams; 8 / 9	(United States) Venus Williams (4/1/0)	2000 Sydney, 2008 Beijing, 2012 London, 2016 Rio de Janeiro	Tennis - Women's singles (2000), Women's doubles (2000, 2008, 2012), Mixed doubles (2016)	
Williams; 8 / 9	(United States) Serena Williams (4/0/0); Sister	2000 Sydney, 2008 Beijing, 2012 London	Tennis - Women's Singles (2012), Women's doubles (2000, 2008, 2012)	
Woodhouse / Gusterson; 2 / 2	(Australia) Danielle Woodhouse (1/0/0)	2000 Sydney	Water Polo - Women's team (2000)	
Woodhouse / Gusterson; 2 / 2	(Australia) Bridgette Gusterson (1/0/0); Sister	2000 Sydney	Water Polo - Women's team (2000)	
Yoneda; 0 / 3	(Japan) Yoko Yoneda (0/2/0)	2000 Sydney, 2004 Athens	Synchronized swimming - Team (2000, 2004)	
Yoneda; 0 / 3	(Japan) Yuko Yoneda (0/1/0); Sister	2000 Sydney	Synchronized swimming - Team (2000)	
Barreto; 0 / 2	(Paraguay) Diego Barreto (0/1/0)	2004 Athens	Football - Men's team (2004)	
Barreto; 0 / 2	(Paraguay) Édgar Barreto (0/1/0); Brother	2004 Athens	Football - Men's team (2004)	
Bekele; 3 / 5	(Ethiopia) Kenenisa Bekele (3/1/0)	2004 Athens, 2008 Beijing	Athletics - Men's 5000m (2004, 2008), 10,000m (2004, 2008)	
Bekele; 3 / 5	(Ethiopia) Tariku Bekele (0/0/1); Brother	2012 London	Athletics - Men's 10,000m (2012)	
Riszdorfer; 0 / 4	(Slovakia) Michal Riszdorfer (0/1/1)	2004 Athens, 2008 Beijing	Canoeing - Men's K-4 1000m (2004, 2008)	
Riszdorfer; 0 / 4	(Slovakia) Richard Riszdorfer (0/1/1); Brother	2004 Athens, 2008 Beijing	Canoeing - Men's K-4 1000m (2004, 2008)	
Ueno; 2 / 3	(Japan) Masae Ueno (2/0/0)	2004 Athens, 2008 Beijing	Judo - Women's 70 kg (2004, 2008)	
Ueno; 2 / 3	(Japan) Yoshie Ueno (0/0/1); Sister	2012 London	Judo - Women's 63 kg (2012)	
Alegre; 0 / 2	(Spain) Ramón Alegre (0/1/0)	2008 Beijing	Field Hockey - Men's team (2008)	
Alegre; 0 / 2	(Spain) David Alegre (0/1/0); Brother	2008 Beijing	Field Hockey - Men's team (2008)	
Bahdanovich; 2 / 4	(Belarus) Aliaksandr Bahdanovich (1/1/0)	2008 Beijing, 2012 London	Canoeing - Men's C-2 1000m (2008, 2012)	
Bahdanovich; 2 / 4	(Belarus) Andrei Bahdanovich (1/1/0); Brother	2008 Beijing, 2012 London	Canoeing - Men's C-2 1000m (2008, 2012)	
Gille; 4 / 4	(France) Guillaume Gille (2/0/0)	2008 Beijing, 2012 London	Handball - Men's team (2008, 2012)	
Gille; 4 / 4	(France) Bertrand Gille (2/0/0); Brother	2008 Beijing, 2012 London	Handball - Men's team (2008, 2012)	
Derikx; 0 / 2	(Netherlands) Geert-Jan Derikx (0/1/0)	2004 Athens	Field Hockey - Men's team (2004)	
Derikx; 0 / 2	(Netherlands) Rob Derikx (0/1/0); Brother	2004 Athens	Field Hockey - Men's team (2004)	
Evers-Swindell; 4 / 4	(New Zealand) Georgina Evers-Swindell (2/0/0)	2004 Athens, 2008 Beijing	Rowing - Double Sculls (2004, 2008)	
Evers-Swindell; 4 / 4	(New Zealand) Caroline Evers-Swindell (2/0/0); Twin-sister	2004 Athens, 2008 Beijing	Rowing - Double Sculls (2004, 2008)	
Icho; 4 / 6	(Japan) Chiharu Icho (0/2/0)	2004 Athens, 2008 Beijing	Wrestling Women's freestyle 48 kg (2004, 2008)	
Icho; 4 / 6	(Japan) Kaori Icho (4/0/0) Sister	2004 Athens, 2008 Beijing, 2012 London, 2016 Rio de Janeiro	Women's freestyle 63 kg (2004, 2008, 2012), Women's freestyle 58 kg (2016)	
Jeannet; 4 / 5	(France) Jérôme Jeannet (2/0/0)	2004 Athens, 2008 Beijing	Fencing - Men's team épée (2004, 2008)	
Jeannet; 4 / 5	(France) Fabrice Jeannet (2/1/0) Brother	2004 Athens, 2008 Beijing	Fencing - Men's team épée (2004, 2008), Individual épée (2008)	
Karabatić; 4 / 6	(France) Nikola Karabatić (3/1/0)	2008 Beijing, 2012 London, 2016 Rio de Janeiro, 2020 Tokyo	Handball - Men's team (2008, 2012, 2016, 2020)	
Karabatić; 4 / 6	(France) Luka Karabatić (1/1/0); Brother	2016 Rio de Janeiro, 2020 Tokyo	Handball - Men's team (2016, 2020)	
López Núñez; 5 / 6	(Cuba) Michel López Núñez (0/0/1)	2004 Athens	Boxing - Super heavyweight (2004)	
López Núñez; 5 / 6	(Cuba) Mijaín López Núñez (5/0/0); Brother	2008 Beijing, 2012 London, 2016 Rio de Janeiro, 2020 Tokyo, 2024 Paris	Wrestling - Greco-Roman 120 kg (2008, 2012), Greco-Roman 130 kg (2016, 2020, 2024)	
Manaudou; 2 / 9	(France) Laure Manaudou (1/1/1)	2004 Athens	Swimming - Women's 400m freestyle (2004), 800m freestyle (2004), 100m backstroke (2004)	
Manaudou; 2 / 9	(France) Florent Manaudou (1/3/2); Brother	2012 London, 2016 Rio de Janeiro, 2020 Tokyo, 2024 Paris	Swimming - Men's 50m freestyle (2012, 2016, 2020, 2024), 4 x 100m freestyle (2016), 4 x 100 medley (2024)	
Metella; 0 / 2	(France) Malia Metella (0/1/0)	2004 Athens	Swimming - Women's 50m freestyle (2004)	
Metella; 0 / 2	(France) Mehdy Metella (0/1/0); Brother	2016 Rio de Janeiro	Swimming - Men's 4 x 100m freestyle (2016)	
Rey; 2 / 2	(Argentina) Lucas Rey (1/0/0)	2016 Rio de Janeiro	Field Hockey - Men's team (2016)	
Rey; 2 / 2	(Argentina) Matías Rey (1/0/0); Brother	2016 Rio de Janeiro	Field Hockey - Men's team (2016)	
Tancheva; 0 / 2	(Bulgaria) Galina Tancheva (0/0/1)	2004 Athens	Rhythmic Gymnastics - Group all-around (2004)	
Tancheva; 0 / 2	(Bulgaria) Vladislava Tancheva (0/0/1); Twin-sister	2004 Athens	Rhythmic Gymnastics - Group all-around (2004)	
Tanrıkulu; 0 / 2	(Turkey) Bahri Tanrıkulu (0/1/0)	2004 Athens	Taekwondo - Men's 80 kg (2004)	
Tanrıkulu; 0 / 2	(Turkey) Azize Tanrıkulu (0/1/0); Sister	2008 Beijing	Taekwondo- Women's 57 kg (2008)	
Bryan; 2 / 5	(United States) Mike Bryan (1/0/2)	2008 Beijing, 2012 London	Tennis - Men's Doubles (2008, 2012), Mixed doubles (2012)	
Bryan; 2 / 5	(United States) Bob Bryan (1/0/1); Twin-brother	2008 Beijing, 2012 London	Tennis - Men's Doubles (2008, 2012)	
Campbell; 7 / 12	(Australia) Cate Campbell (4/1/3)	2008 Beijing, 2012 London, 2016 Rio de Janeiro, 2020 Tokyo	Swimming - 50m freestyle (2008), 100m freestyle (2020), 4 x 100m freestyle (2008, 2012, 2016, 2020), 4 x 100m medley (2016, 2020)	
Campbell; 7 / 12	(Australia) Bronte Campbell (3/0/1); Sister	2016 Rio de Janeiro, 2020 Tokyo, 2024 Paris	Swimming - 4 x 100m freestyle (2016, 2020, 2024), mixed 4 x 100m medley (2020)	
Chambers; 0 / 2	(United Kingdom) Richard Chambers (0/1/0)	2012 London	Rowing - Men's lightweight coxless four (2012)	
Chambers; 0 / 2	(United Kingdom) Peter Chambers (0/1/0) Brother	2012 London	Rowing - Men's lightweight coxless four (2012)	
Gasol; 0 / 5	(Spain) Pau Gasol (0/2/1)	2008 Beijing, 2012 London, 2016 Rio de Janeiro	Basketball - Men's team (2008, 2012, 2016)	
Gasol; 0 / 5	(Spain) Marc Gasol (0/2/0) Brother	2008 Beijing, 2012 London	Basketball - Men's team (2008, 2012)	
Gofers; 0 / 2	(Australia) Taniele Gofers (0/0/1)	2008 Beijing	Water Polo - Women's team (2008)	
Gofers; 0 / 2	(Australia) Keesja Gofers (0/1/0) Sister	2024 Paris	Water Polo - Women's team (2008)	
Guénot; 1 / 3	(France) Christophe Guénot (0/0/1)	2008 Beijing	Wrestling - Men's Greco-Roman 74 kg (2008)	
Guénot; 1 / 3	(France) Steeve Guénot (1/0/1) Brother	2008 Beijing, 2012 London	Wrestling - Men's Greco-Roman 66 kg (2008, 2012)	
Hauke; 2 / 4	(Germany) Tobias Hauke (2/0/1)	2008 Beijing, 2012 London, 2016 Rio de Janeiro	Field Hockey - Men's team (2008, 2012, 2016)	
Hauke; 2 / 4	(Germany) Franzisca Hauke (0/0/1); Sister	2016 Rio de Janeiro, 2020 Tokyo	Field Hockey - Women's team (2016)	
Hurley; 0 / 2	(United States) Kelley Hurley (0/0/1)	2012 London	Fencing - Women's team foil (2012)	
Hurley; 0 / 2	(United States) Courtney Hurley (0/0/1); Sister	2012 London	Fencing - Women's team foil (2012)	
Jiang; 0 / 4	(China) Jiang Wenwen (0/1/1)	2008 Beijing, 2012 London	Synchronized swimming - Team competition (2008, 2012)	
Jiang; 0 / 4	(China) Jiang Tingting (0/1/1); Twin-sister	2008 Beijing, 2012 London	Synchronized swimming - Team competition (2008, 2012)	
Lőrincz; 1 / 3	(Hungary) Tamás Lőrincz (1/1/0)	2012 London, 2020 Tokyo	Wrestling - Greco-Roman 66 kg (2012), Greco-Roman 77 kg (2020)	
Lőrincz; 1 / 3	(Hungary) Viktor Lőrincz (0/1/0); Brother	2020 Tokyo	Wrestling - Greco-Roman 87 kg (2020)	
Lunde; 5 / 7	(Norway) Katrine Lunde (3/0/2)	2008 Beijing, 2012 London, 2016 Rio de Janeiro, 2020 Tokyo, 2024 Paris	Handball - Women's team (2008, 2012, 2016, 2020, 2024)	
Lunde; 5 / 7	(Norway) Kristine Lunde-Borgersen (2/0/0); Sister	2008 Beijing, 2012 London	Handball - Women's team (2008, 2012)	
Ohuruogu; 1 / 5	(United Kingdom) Christine Ohuruogu (1/1/2)	2008 Beijing, 2012 London, 2016 Rio de Janeiro	Athletics - Women's 400m (2008, 2012), 4 x 400m (2008, 2016)	
Ohuruogu; 1 / 5	(United Kingdom) Victoria Ohuruogu (0/0/1); Sister	2024 Paris	Athletics - Women's 4 x 400m (2024)	
Peckolt; 0 / 2	(Germany) Jan-Peter Peckolt (0/0/1)	2008 Beijing	Sailing - 49er (2008)	
Peckolt; 0 / 2	(Germany) Hannes Peckolt (0/0/1); Brother	2008 Beijing	Sailing - 49er (2008)	
Pijetlović; 4 / 7	(Serbia) Gojko Pijetlović (2/0/1)	2012 London, 2016 Rio de Janeiro, 2020 Tokyo	Water Polo - Men's Team (2012, 2016, 2020)	
Pijetlović; 4 / 7	(Serbia) Duško Pijetlović (2/0/2); Brother	2008 Beijing, 2012 London, 2016 Rio de Janeiro, 2020 Tokyo	Water Polo - Men's Team (2008, 2012, 2016, 2020)	
Santoromito; 0 / 2	(Australia) Mia Santoromito (0/0/1)	2008 Beijing	Water Polo - Women's team (2008)	
Santoromito; 0 / 2	(Australia) Jenna Santoromito (0/0/1); Sister	2008 Beijing	Water Polo - Women's team (2008)	
Smart; 0 / 2	(United States) Keeth Smart (0/1/0)	2008 Beijing	Fencing- Sabre Team (2008)	
Smart; 0 / 2	(United States) Erinn Smart (0/1/0); Sister	2008 Beijing	Fencing- Foil Team (2008)	
Steffens; 4 / 5	(United States) Jessica Steffens (1/1/0)	2008 Beijing, 2012 London	Water Polo - Women's team (2008, 2012)	
Steffens; 4 / 5	(United States) Maggie Steffens (3/0/0); Sister	2012 London, 2016 Rio de Janeiro, 2020 Tokyo	Water Polo - Women's team (2012, 2016, 2020)	
Varga; 2 / 3	(Hungary) Dániel Varga (1/0/0)	2008 Beijing	Water Polo - Men's Team (2008)	
Varga; 2 / 3	(Hungary) Dénes Varga (1/0/1); Brother	2008 Beijing, 2020 Tokyo	Water Polo - Men's Team (2008, 2020)	
Yumoto; 0 / 2	(Japan) Kenichi Yumoto (0/1/0)	2008 Beijing	Wrestling - Men's freestyle 60 kg (2008)	
Yumoto; 0 / 2	(Japan) Shin'ichi Yumoto (0/0/1); Twin-brother	2012 London	Wrestling - Men's freestyle 55 kg (2012)	
Anderson; 1 / 2	(United States) Alyssa Anderson (1/0/0)	2012 London	Swimming - Women's 4 × 200 m freestyle (2012)	
Anderson; 1 / 2	(United States) Haley Anderson (0/1/0); Sister	2012 London	Swimming - Women's marathon 10 km (2012)	
Brownlee; 3 / 5	(United Kingdom) Alistair Brownlee (2/0/0)	2012 London, 2016 Rio de Janeiro	Triathlon (2012, 2016)	
Brownlee; 3 / 5	(United Kingdom) Jonathan Brownlee (1/1/1); Brother	2012 London, 2016 Rio de Janeiro, 2020 Tokyo	Triathlon (2012, 2016), mixed triathlon relay (2020)	
Edmondson; 0 / 2	(Australia) Annette Edmondson (0/0/1)	2012 London	Cycling - Women's omnium (2012)	
Edmondson; 0 / 2	(Australia) Alex Edmondson (0/1/0); Brother	2016 Rio de Janeiro	Cycling - Men's team pursuit (2016)	
Espar; 1 / 4	(Spain) Anni Espar (1/2/0)	2012 London, 2020 Tokyo, 2024 Paris	Water Polo - Women's Team (2012, 2020, 2024)	
Espar; 1 / 4	(Spain) Clara Espar (0/1/0); Sister	2020 Tokyo	Water Polo - Women's Team (2020)	
Falcão; 0 / 2	(Brazil) Yamaguchi Falcão (0/0/1)	2012 London	Boxing - Men's light heavyweight (2012)	
Falcão; 0 / 2	(Brazil) Esquiva Falcão (0/1/0); Brother	2012 London	Boxing - Men's middleweight (2012)	
Govers; 0 / 2	(Australia) Kieran Govers (0/0/1)	2012 London	Field Hockey - Men's team (2012)	
Govers; 0 / 2	(Australia) Blake Govers (0/1/0); Brother	2020 Tokyo	Field Hockey - Men's team (2020)	
Harting; 2 / 2	(Germany) Robert Harting (1/0/0)	2012 London	Athletics - Men's discus throw (2012)	
Harting; 2 / 2	(Germany) Christoph Harting (1/0/0); Brother	2016 Rio de Janeiro	Athletics - Men's discus throw (2016)	
Landin Jacobsen; 3 / 5	(Denmark) Niklas Landin Jacobsen (2/1/0)	2016 Rio de Janeiro, 2020 Tokyo, 2024 Paris	Handball - Men's team (2016, 2020, 2024)	
Landin Jacobsen; 3 / 5	(Denmark) Magnus Landin Jacobsen (1/1/0); Brother	2020 Tokyo, 2024 Paris	Handball - Men's team (2020, 2024)	
Presciutti; 0 / 3	(Italy) Christian Presciutti (0/1/1)	2012 London, 2016 Rio de Janeiro	Water Polo - Men's team (2012, 2016)	
Presciutti; 0 / 3	(Italy) Nicholas Presciutti (0/0/1); Brother	2016 Rio de Janeiro	Water Polo - Men's team (2016)	
Sinković; 6 / 8	(Croatia) Valent Sinković (3/1/0)	2012 London, 2016 Rio de Janeiro, 2020 Tokyo, 2024 Paris	Rowing - Men's quad sculls (2012), double sculls (2016), coxless pair (2020, 2024)	
Sinković; 6 / 8	(Croatia) Martin Sinković (3/1/0); Brother	2012 London, 2016 Rio de Janeiro, 2020 Tokyo, 2024 Paris	Rowing - Men's quad sculls (2012), double sculls (2016), coxless pair (2020, 2024)	
Smulders; 0 / 2	(Netherlands) Laura Smulders (0/0/1)	2012 London	Cycling - Women's BMX racing (2012)	
Smulders; 0 / 2	(Netherlands) Merel Smulders (0/0/1); Sister	2020 Tokyo	Cycling - Women's BMX racing (2020)	
Sruoga; 0 / 2	(Argentina) Daniela Sruoga (0/1/0)	2012 London	Field Hockey - Women's team (2012)	
Sruoga; 0 / 2	(Argentina) Josefina Sruoga (0/1/0); Sister	2012 London	Field Hockey - Women's team (2012)	
Tanaka; 1 / 3	(Japan) Kazuhito Tanaka (0/1/0)	2012 London	Gymnastics - Men's Team (2012)	
Tanaka; 1 / 3	(Japan) Yusuke Tanaka (1/1/0); Brother	2012 London, 2016 Rio de Janeiro	Gymnastics - Men's Team (2012, 2016)	
Toft Hansen; 2 / 3	(Denmark) René Toft Hansen (1/0/0)	2012 London, 2016 Rio de Janeiro	Handball - Men's team (2016)	
Toft Hansen; 2 / 3	(Denmark) Henrik Toft Hansen (1/1/0); Brother	2016 Rio de Janeiro, 2020 Tokyo	Handball - Men's team (2016, 2020)	
Bender; 0 / 2	(Germany) Lars Bender (0/1/0)	2016 Rio de Janeiro	Football - Men's team (2016)	
Bender; 0 / 2	(Germany) Sven Bender (0/1/0); Twin-brother	2016 Rio de Janeiro	Football - Men's team (2016)	
Bereș; 2 / 3	(Romania) Mădălina Bereș (1/0/1)	2016 Rio de Janeiro, 2024 Paris	Rowing - Women's eight (2016, 2024)	
Bereș; 2 / 3	(Romania) Amalia Bereș (1/0/0); Sister	2024 Paris	Rowing - Women's eight (2024)	
Dabović; 0 / 2	(Serbia) Milica Dabović (0/0/1)	2016 Rio de Janeiro	Basketball - Women's Team (2016)	
Dabović; 0 / 2	(Serbia) Ana Dabović (0/0/1); Sister	2016 Rio de Janeiro	Basketball - Women's Team (2016)	
Fischer; 4 / 4	(United States) Makenzie Fischer (2/0/0)	2016 Rio de Janeiro, 2020 Tokyo	Water Polo - Women's team (2016, 2020)	
Fischer; 4 / 4	(United States) Aria Fischer (2/0/0); Sister	2016 Rio de Janeiro, 2020 Tokyo	Water Polo - Women's team (2016, 2020)	
Garozzo; 1 / 3	(Italy) Daniele Garozzo (1/1/0)	2016 Rio de Janeiro, 2020 Tokyo	Fencing - Foil individual (2016, 2020)	
Garozzo; 1 / 3	(Italy) Enrico Garozzo (0/1/0); Brother	2016 Rio de Janeiro	Fencing - Épée team (2016)	
Grambusch; 0 / 4	(Germany) Mats Grambusch (0/1/1)	2016 Rio de Janeiro, 2024 Paris	Field Hockey - Men's team (2016, 2024)	
Grambusch; 0 / 4	(Germany) Tom Grambusch (0/1/1); Brother	2016 Rio de Janeiro, 2024 Paris	Field Hockey - Men's team (2016, 2024)	
Paulis; 1 / 3	(Netherlands) Ilse Paulis (1/1/0)	2016 Rio de Janeiro, 2020 Tokyo	Rowing - Women's lightweight double sculls (2016, 2020)	
Paulis; 1 / 3	(Netherlands) Bente Paulis (0/1/0); Sister	2024 Paris	Rowing - Women's quadruple sculls (2024)	
Shoji; 0 / 3	(United States) Kawika Shoji (0/0/1)	2016 Rio de Janeiro	Volleyball - Men's Team (2016)	
Shoji; 0 / 3	(United States) Erik Shoji (0/0/2); Brother	2016 Rio de Janeiro, 2024 Paris	Volleyball - Men's Team (2016, 2024)	
Kawai; 3 / 3	(Japan) Risako Kawai (2/0/0)	2016 Rio de Janeiro, 2020 Tokyo	Wrestling - Women's freestyle 63 kg (2016), Women's freestyle 57 kg (2020)	
Kawai; 3 / 3	(Japan) Yukako Kawai (1/0/0); Sister	2020 Tokyo	Wrestling - Women's freestyle 62 kg (2020)	
McKeown; 6 / 10	(Australia) Taylor McKeown (0/1/0)	2016 Rio de Janeiro	Swimming – 4 x 100m medley (2016)	
McKeown; 6 / 10	(Australia) Kaylee McKeown (5/1/3); Sister	2020 Tokyo, 2024 Paris	Swimming – 100m backstroke (2020, 2024), 200m backstroke (2020, 2024), 200m individual medley (2024) 4 x 100m medley (2020, 2024), mixed 4 x 100m medley (2020, 2024)	
Oruz; 0 / 2	(Germany) Timur Oruz (0/0/1)	2016 Rio de Janeiro, 2020 Tokyo	Field Hockey - Men's team (2016)	
Oruz; 0 / 2	(Germany) Selin Oruz (0/0/1); Sister	2016 Rio de Janeiro	Field Hockey - Women's team (2016)	
Abe; 3 / 7	(Japan) Hifumi Abe (2/2/0)	2020 Tokyo, 2024 Paris	Judo - Men's 66 kg (2020, 2024), Mixed team (2020, 2024)	
Abe; 3 / 7	(Japan) Uta Abe (1/2/0); Sister	2020 Tokyo, 2024 Paris	Judo - Women's 52 kg (2020), Mixed team (2020, 2024)	
Aleksiiva; 0 / 2	(Ukraine) Maryna Aleksiiva (0/0/1)	2020 Tokyo	Artistic Swimming - Team (2020)	
Aleksiiva; 0 / 2	(Ukraine) Vladyslava Aleksiiva (0/0/1); Twin-sister	2020 Tokyo	Artistic Swimming - Team (2020)	
Borodachev; 0 / 2	ROC Anton Borodachev (0/1/0)	2020 Tokyo	Fencing - Men's team foil (2020)	
Borodachev; 0 / 2	ROC Kirill Borodachev (0/1/0); Twin-brother	2020 Tokyo	Fencing - Men's team foil (2020)	
Dájomes / Palacios; 1 / 3	(Ecuador) Neisi Dájomes (1/0/1)	2020 Tokyo, 2024 Paris	Weightlifting - Women's 76 kg (2020, 2024)	
Dájomes / Palacios; 1 / 3	(Ecuador) Angie Palacios (0/0/1); Sister	2024 Paris	Weightlifting - Women's 71 kg (2024)	
Ford; 1 / 3	(United Kingdom) Thomas Ford (1/0/1)	2020 Tokyo, 2024 Paris	Rowing - Men's eight (2020, 2024)	
Ford; 1 / 3	(United Kingdom) Emily Ford (0/0/1); Sister	2024 Paris	Rowing - Women's eight (2024)	
Frey; 0 / 2	(Germany) Karl-Richard Frey (0/0/1)	2020 Tokyo	Judo - Mixed team (2020)	
Frey; 0 / 2	(Germany) Johannes Frey (0/0/1); Brother	2020 Tokyo	Judo - Mixed team (2020)	
Frolkina; 0 / 2	ROC Evgeniia Frolkina (0/1/0)	2020 Tokyo	Basketball - Women's 3x3 (2020)	
Frolkina; 0 / 2	ROC Olga Frolkina (0/1/0); Twin-sister	2020 Tokyo	Basketball - Women's 3x3 (2020)	
Gadirova; 0 / 2	(United Kingdom) Jessica Gadirova (0/0/1)	2020 Tokyo	Gymnastics - Women's team all-around (2020)	
Gadirova; 0 / 2	(United Kingdom) Jennifer Gadirova (0/0/1); Twin sister	2020 Tokyo	Gymnastics - Women's team all-around (2020)	
Harimoto; 0 / 2	(Japan) Tomokazu Harimoto (0/0/1)	2020 Tokyo	Table Tennis - Men's team (2020)	
Harimoto; 0 / 2	(Japan) Miwa Harimoto (0/1/0); Sister	2024 Paris	Table Tennis - Women's team (2024)	
Mewis; 0 / 2	(United States) Kristie Mewis (0/0/1)	2020 Tokyo	Football - Women's team (2020)	
Mewis; 0 / 2	(United States) Sam Mewis (0/0/1); Sister	2020 Tokyo	Football - Women's team (2020)	
van der Westhuyzen; 1 / 2	(Australia) Jean van der Westhuyzen (1/0/0)	2020 Tokyo	Canoeing - Men's K-2 1000m (2020)	
van der Westhuyzen; 1 / 2	(Australia) Pierre van der Westhuyzen (0/1/0); Brother	2024 Paris	Canoeing - Men's K-4 500m (2024)	
Walsh; 2 / 5	(United States) Alex Walsh (0/1/0)	2020 Tokyo	Swimming - Women's 200m individual medley (2020)	
Walsh; 2 / 5	(United States) Gretchen Walsh (2/2/0); Sister	2024 Paris	Swimming - Women's 100m butterfly (2024), 4 x 100m freestyle (2024), 4 x 100m medley (2024), mixed 4 x 100m medley (2024)	
Wang; 4 / 5	(China) Wang Liuyi (2/1/0)	2024 Paris	Artistic Swimming - Team (2024), Duet (2024)	
Wang; 4 / 5	(China) Wang Qianyi (2/0/0); Twin-sister	2020 Tokyo, 2024 Paris	Artistic Swimming - Team (2020, 2024), Duet (2024)	
de Brouwer; 0 / 2	(Netherlands) Bregje de Brouwer (0/0/1)	2024 Paris	Artistic Swimming - Duet (2024)	
de Brouwer; 0 / 2	(Netherlands) Noortje de Brouwer (0/0/1); Twin-sister	2024 Paris	Artistic Swimming - Duet (2024)	
Dodd; 0 / 2	(United States) Chase Dodd (0/0/1)	2024 Paris	Water Polo - Men's team (2024)	
Dodd; 0 / 2	(United States) Ryder Dodd (0/0/1); Brother	2024 Paris	Water Polo - Men's team (2024)	
Iversen; 0 / 2	(Denmark) Sarah Iversen (0/0/1)	2024 Paris	Handball - Women's Team (2024)	
Iversen; 0 / 2	(Denmark) Rikke Iversen (0/0/1); Sister	2024 Paris	Handball - Women's Team (2024)	
Lebrun; 0 / 3	(France) Alexis Lebrun (0/0/1)	2024 Paris	Table Tennis - Men's team (2024)	
Lebrun; 0 / 3	(France) Félix Lebrun (0/0/2); Brother	2024 Paris	Table Tennis - Men's singles (2024), team (2024)	
Nielsen; 1 / 5	(United Kingdom) Laviai Nielsen (0/0/2)	2024 Paris	Athletics - Women's 4 x 400m (2024), Mixed 4 x 400 (2024)	
Nielsen; 1 / 5	(United Kingdom) Lina Nielsen (0/0/1); Sister	2024 Paris	Athletics - Women's 4 x 400m (2024)	
Rogge; 0 / 2	(Netherlands) Bente Rogge (0/0/1)	2024 Paris	Water Polo - Women's Team (2024)	
Rogge; 0 / 2	(Netherlands) Lieke Rogge (0/0/1); Sister	2024 Paris	Water Polo - Women's Team (2024)	

=== Spousal ===
Family Gold Medal/ Total	Member (Gold/Silver/Bronze) Relationship	Olympics	Sports	Note
Johnson; 0 / 3	(United Kingdom) James H. Johnson (0/1/0)	1908 London	Figure Skating - Pairs (1908)	
Johnson; 0 / 3	(United Kingdom) Phyllis Johnson (0/1/1); Wife	1908 London, 1920 Antwerp	Figure Skating - Pairs (1908, 1920)	
Rivett-Carnac; 2 / 2	(United Kingdom) Charles Rivett-Carnac (1/0/0)	1908 London	Sailing - 7 metres (1908)	
Rivett-Carnac; 2 / 2	(United Kingdom) Frances Rivett-Carnac (1/0/0); Wife	1908 London	Sailing - 7 metres (1908)	
Syers; 1 / 3	(United Kingdom) Edgar Syers (0/0/1)	1908 London	Figure Skating - Pairs (1908)	
Syers; 1 / 3	(United Kingdom) Madge Syers (1/0/1); Wife	1908 London	Figure Skating - Women's Singles (1908), Pairs (1908)	
Bryn; 0 / 2	(Norway) Yngvar Bryn (0/1/0)	1920 Antwerp	Figure Skating - Pairs (1920)	
Bryn; 0 / 2	(Norway) Alexia Bryn (0/1/0); Wife	1920 Antwerp	Figure Skating - Pairs (1920)	
Wright; 2 / 2	(United Kingdom) Cyril Wright (1/0/0)	1920 Antwerp	Sailing - 7 metre (1920)	
Wright; 2 / 2	(United Kingdom) Dorothy Wright (1/0/0); Wife	1920 Antwerp	Sailing - 7 metre (1920)	
Badcock; 1 / 6	(United Kingdom) John Badcock (1/1/0)	1928 Amsterdam, 1932 Los Angeles	Rowing - Eight (1928), Coxless four (1932)	
Badcock; 1 / 6	(United Kingdom) Joyce Cooper (0/1/3); Wife	1928 Amsterdam, 1932 Los Angeles	Swimming - 100m freestyle (1928), 100m backstroke (1928), 4 x 100m freestyle (1928, 1932)	
Scharten; 0 / 2	(Netherlands) Margo Scharten-Antink (0/0/1)	1928 Amsterdam	Art - Epic works (1928)	
Scharten; 0 / 2	(Netherlands) Carel Scharten (0/0/1); Husband	1928 Amsterdam	Art - Epic works (1928)	
Baranyai; 0 / 2	(Hungary) László Baranyai (0/0/1)	1948 London	Gymnastics - Men's Team (1948)	
Baranyai; 0 / 2	(Hungary) Erzsébet Balázs (0/1/0); Wife	1948 London	Gymnastics - Women's Team (1948)	
Lemhényi; 3 / 8	(Hungary) Dezső Lemhényi (1/1/0)	1948 London, 1952 Helsinki	Water Polo (1948, 1952)	
Lemhényi; 3 / 8	(Hungary) Olga Tass (1/3/2); Wife	1948 London, 1952 Helsinki, 1956 Melbourne	Gymnastics - Women's Team (1948, 1952, 1956), Vault (1956), Team portable apparatus (1952, 1956)	
Zátopek; 5 / 7	(Czechoslovakia) Emil Zátopek (4/1/0)	1948 London, 1952 Helsinki	Athletics - 5000 m (1948,1952), 1000 m (1948,1952), Marathon (1952)	
Zátopek; 5 / 7	(Czechoslovakia) Dana Zátopková (1/1/0); Wife	1952 Helsinki, 1960 Rome	Athletics - Javelin throw (1952, 1960)	
Ilyin / Shamrai; 2 / 3	(Soviet Union) Anatoli Ilyin (1/0/0)	1956 Melbourne	Football (1956)	
Ilyin / Shamrai; 2 / 3	(Soviet Union) Galina Shamrai (1/1/0); Wife	1952 Helsinki	Gymnastics - Women's Team (1952), Women's Team Portable Apparatus (1952)	
Muratov; 6 / 13	(Soviet Union) Valentin Muratov (4/1/0)	1952 Helsinki, 1956 Melbourne	Gymnastics - Men's Team (1952, 1956), Vault (1956), Rings (1956), Floor Exercise (1956)	
Muratov; 6 / 13	(Soviet Union) Sofia Muratova (2/2/4); Wife	1956 Melbourne, 1960 Rome	Gymnastics - Women's Team (1956, 1960), All-around (1956, 1960), Vault (1960), Uneven Bars (1956), Balance Beam (1960), Women's Team Portable Apparatus (1956)	
Ono; 5 / 14	(Japan) Takashi Ono (5/4/4)	1952 Helsinki, 1956 Melbourne, 1960 Rome, 1964 Tokyo	Gymnastics - Men's Team (1956, 1960, 1964), Horizontal Bar (1956, 1960), Vault (1952, 1960) All-around (1956, 1960), Pommel Horse (1956), Parallel Bars (1956, 1960), Rings (1960)	
Ono; 5 / 14	(Japan) Kiyoko Ono (0/0/1) Wife	1960 Rome, 1964 Tokyo	Gymnastics - Women's Team (1964)	
Sákovics; 1 / 6	(Hungary) József Sákovics (0/1/2)	1952 Helsinki, 1956 Melbourne, 1960 Rome	Fencing - Men's team foil (1952, 1956), team épée (1956)	
Sákovics; 1 / 6	(Hungary) Lidia Dömölki-Sakovics (1/2/0) Wife	1956 Melbourne, 1960 Rome, 1964 Tokyo, 1968 Mexico City	Fencing - Women's team foil (1960, 1964, 1968)	
Connolly / Fikotová; 2 / 2	(United States) Hal Connolly (1/0/0)	1956 Melbourne	Athletics - Hammer throw (1956)	Later divorced
Connolly / Fikotová; 2 / 2	(Czechoslovakia) Olga Fikotová (1/0/0); Wife	1956 Melbourne	Athletics - Discus throw (1956)	
Ivanov; 3 / 4	(Soviet Union) Valentin Ivanov (1/0/0)	1956 Melbourne	Football (1956)	
Ivanov; 3 / 4	(Soviet Union) Lidiya Ivanova (2/0/1); Wife	1956 Melbourne, 1960 Rome	Gymnastics - Women's Team (1956, 1960), Women's Team Portable Apparatus (1956)	
Balczó / Császár; 3 / 6	(Hungary) András Balczó (3/2/0)	1960 Rome, 1968 Mexico City, 1972 Munich	Modern Pentathlon - Individual (1968, 1972), Team (1960, 1968, 1972)	
Balczó / Császár; 3 / 6	(Hungary) Mónika Császár (0/0/1) Wife	1972 Munich	Gymnastics - Women's Team (1972)	
Drîmbă; 1 / 3	(Romania) Ion Drîmbă (1/0/0)	1960 Rome, 1964 Tokyo, 1968 Mexico City	Fencing - Men's individual foil (1968)	Later divorced
Drîmbă; 1 / 3	(Romania) Ileana Gyulai-Drîmbă-Jenei (0/0/2); Wife	1964 Tokyo, 1968 Mexico City, 1972 Munich, 1976 Montreal	Fencing - Women's team foil (1968, 1972)	
Mitsukuri; 2 / 3	(Japan) Takashi Mitsukuri (2/0/0)	1960 Rome, 1964 Tokyo	Gymnastics - Men's Team (1960, 1964)	
Mitsukuri; 2 / 3	(Japan) Taniko Nakamura-Mitsukuri (0/0/1) Wife	1964 Tokyo, 1968 Mexico City	Gymnastics - Women's Team (1964)	
Odložil / Čáslavská; 7 / 12	(Czechoslovakia) Josef Odložil (0/1/0)	1964 Tokyo, 1968 Mexico City	Athletics - Men's 1500m (1964)	Later divorced
Odložil / Čáslavská; 7 / 12	(Czechoslovakia) Věra Čáslavská (7/4/0) Wife	1960 Rome, 1964 Tokyo, 1968 Mexico City	Gymnastics - Women's Team (1960, 1964, 1968), All-around (1964, 1968), Vault (1964, 1968), Balance Beam (1964, 1968), Floor (1968), Uneven Bars (1968)	
Hickcox / Bush; 4 / 5	(United States) Charlie Hickcox (3/1/0)	1968 Mexico City	Swimming - Men's 100m backstroke (1968), 200m individual medley (1968), 400m individual medley (1968), 4 x 100m medley (1968)	Later divorced
Hickcox / Bush; 4 / 5	(United States) Lesley Bush (1/0/0) Wife	1964 Tokyo, 1968 Mexico City	Diving - Women's 10m platform (1964)	
Sitzberger / Collier; 1 / 2	(United States) Kenneth Sitzberger (1/0/0)	1964 Tokyo	Diving - Men's 3m springboard (1964)	
Sitzberger / Collier; 1 / 2	(United States) Jeanne Collier (0/1/0) Wife	1964 Tokyo	Diving - Women's 3m springboard (1964)	
Andrianov / Burda; 9 / 17	(Soviet Union) Nikolai Andrianov (7/5/3)	1972 Munich, 1976 Montreal, 1980 Moscow	Gymnastics - Men's Team (1972, 1976, 1980), All-around (1976, 1980), Vault (1972, 1976, 1980), Horizontal Bar (1980), Parallel Bars (1976), Rings (1976), Pommel Horse (1976), Floor Exercise (1972, 1976, 1980)	Later divorced
Andrianov / Burda; 9 / 17	(Soviet Union) Lyubov Burda (2/0/0) Wife	1968 Mexico City, 1972 Munich	Gymnastics - Women's Team (1968, 1972)	
Borzov / Tourischeva; 6 / 14	(Soviet Union) Valeriy Borzov (2/1/2)	1972 Munich, 1976 Montreal	Athletics - Men's 100m (1972, 1976), 200m (1972), 4 x 100m (1972, 1976)	
Borzov / Tourischeva; 6 / 14	(Soviet Union) Ludmilla Tourischeva (4/3/2) Wife	1968 Mexico City, 1972 Munich, 1976 Montreal	Gymnastics - Women's Team (1968, 1972, 1976), All-around (1972, 1976), Vault (1972, 1976), Floor Exercise (1972, 1976)	
Karasyov; 1 / 2	(Soviet Union) Valery Karasyov (0/1/0)	1968 Mexico City	Gymnastics - Men's Team (1968)	
Karasyov; 1 / 2	(Soviet Union) Olga Karasyova (1/0/0) Wife	1968 Mexico City	Gymnastics - Women's Team (1968)	
Klimenko / Petrik; 3 / 8	(Soviet Union) Viktor Klimenko (1/3/1)	1968 Mexico City, 1972 Munich	Gymnastics - Men's Team (1968, 1972), Vault (1972), Parallel Bars (1968), Pommel Horse (1972)	
Klimenko / Petrik; 3 / 8	(Soviet Union) Larisa Petrik (2/0/1); Wife	1968 Mexico City	Gymnastics - Women's Team (1968), Balance Beam (1968), Floor Exercise (1968)	
Voronin; 3 / 13	(Soviet Union) Mikhail Voronin (2/6/1)	1968 Mexico City, 1972 Munich	Gymnastics - Men's Team (1968, 1972), Vault (1968), Horizontal Bar (1968), Parallel Bars (1968), Rings (1968, 1972), Pommel Horse (1968)	Later divorced
Voronin; 3 / 13	(Soviet Union) Zinaida Voronina (1/1/2); Wife	1968 Mexico City	Gymnastics - Women's Team (1968), All-around (1968), Vault (1968), Uneven Bars (1968)	
Dan; 0 / 2	(Romania) Marin Dan (0/0/1)	1972 Munich	Handball - Men's team (1972)	
Dan; 0 / 2	(Romania) Aurora Dan (0/1/0); Wife	1980 Moscow, 1984 Los Angeles	Fencing - Women's team foil (1984)	
Conner / Comăneci; 7 / 11	(United States) Bart Conner (2/0/0)	1976 Montreal, 1984 Los Angeles	Gymnastics - Men's Team (1984), Parallel bars (1984)	
Conner / Comăneci; 7 / 11	(Romania) Nadia Comăneci (5/3/1) Wife	1976 Montreal, 1980 Moscow	Gymnastics - Women's Team (1976, 1980), All-Around (1976, 1980), Uneven Bars (1976), Balance Beam (1976, 1980), Floor Exercise (1976, 1980)	
Green; 1 / 2	(United Kingdom) Lucinda Green (0/1/0)	1976 Montreal, 1984 Los Angeles	Equestrian - Team eventing (1984)	Later divorced
Green; 1 / 2	(Australia) David Green (1/0/0); Husband	1988 Seoul, 1992 Barcelona, 1996 Atlanta	Equestrian - Team eventing (1992)	
Kim / Movchan; 6 / 7	(Soviet Union) Nellie Kim (5/1/0)	1976 Montreal, 1980 Moscow	Gymnastics - Women's Team (1976, 1980), All-around (1976), Vault (1976), Floor Exercise (1976, 1980)	
Kim / Movchan; 6 / 7	(Soviet Union) Valery Movchan (1/0/0); Husband	1980 Moscow	Cycling - Men's Team Pursuit (1980)	
Kurrat; 0 / 2	(East Germany) Klaus-Dieter Kurrat (0/1/0)	1976 Montreal, 1980 Moscow	Athletics - Men's 4 × 100m (1976)	
Kurrat; 0 / 2	(East Germany) Kerstin Gerschau (0/0/1); Wife	1976 Montreal	Gymnastics - Women's team (1976)	
Sedykh / Kondratyeva; 3 / 5	(Soviet Union) Yuriy Sedykh (2/1/0)	1976 Montreal, 1980 Moscow, 1988 Seoul	Athletics - Men's hammer throw (1976, 1980, 1988)	Later divorced
Sedykh / Kondratyeva; 3 / 5	(Soviet Union) Lyudmila Kondratyeva (1/0/1); Wife	1980 Moscow, 1988 Seoul	Athletics - Women's 100m (1980), 4 x 100m relay (1988)	
Sedykh / Lisovskaya; 3 / 4	(Soviet Union) Yuriy Sedykh (2/1/0)	1976 Montreal, 1980 Moscow, 1988 Seoul	Athletics - Men's hammer throw (1976, 1980, 1988)	
Sedykh / Lisovskaya; 3 / 4	(Soviet Union) / (Unified Team at the Olympics) Natalya Lisovskaya (1/0/0); Wife	1988 Seoul, 1992 Barcelona	Athletics - Women's shot put (1988)	
Cook; 0 / 4	(United Kingdom) Garry Cook (0/1/0)	1984 Los Angeles	Athletics - Men's 4 x 100m relay (1984)	
Cook; 0 / 4	(United Kingdom) Kathy Smallwood-Cook (0/0/3); Wife	1980 Moscow, 1984 Los Angeles	Athletics - Women's 4 x 100m relay (1980, 1984), 400m (1984)	
Oakes; 0 / 3	(United Kingdom) Gary Oakes (0/0/1)	1980 Moscow	Athletics - Men's 400m hurdles (1980)	
Oakes; 0 / 3	(United Kingdom) Heather Oakes (0/0/2); Wife	1980 Moscow, 1984 Los Angeles	Athletics - Women's 4 x 100m relay (1980, 1984)	
Hoy; 3 / 7	(Australia) Andrew Hoy (3/2/1)	1992 Barcelona, 1996 Atlanta, 2000 Sydney, 2020 Tokyo	Equestrian - Team Eventing (1992, 1996, 2000, 2020), Individual Eventing (2000, 2020)	Later divorced
Hoy; 3 / 7	(West Germany) Bettina Hoy (0/0/1); Wife	1984 Los Angeles	Equestrian - Team Eventing (1984)	
Li / Chen; 3 / 7	(China) Li Ning (3/2/1)	1984 Los Angeles, 1988 Seoul	Gymnastics - Men's Team (1984), All-around (1984), Floor (1984), Pommel Horse (1984), Rings (1984), Vault (1984)	
Li / Chen; 3 / 7	(China) Chen Yongyan (0/0/1); Wife	1984 Los Angeles	Gymnastics - Women's Team (1984)	
Li / Wu; 0 / 2	(China) Li Yuejiu (0/1/0)	1984 Los Angeles	Gymnastics - Men's Team (1984)	
Li / Wu; 0 / 2	(China) Wu Jiani (0/0/1); Wife	1984 Los Angeles	Gymnastics - Women's Team (1984)	
Szabo; 0 / 3	(Romania) Vilmoș Szabo (0/0/1)	1984 Los Angeles	Fencing - Men's team sabre (1984)	
Szabo; 0 / 3	(Romania) Reka Zsofia Lazăr-Szabo (0/1/1); Wife	1992 Barcelona, 1996 Atlanta	Fencing - Women's team foil (1992, 1996)	
Tan / Li; 0 / 4	(China) Tan Liangde (0/3/0)	1984 Los Angeles, 1988 Seoul, 1992 Barcelona	Diving - Men's 3m Springboard (1984, 1988, 1992)	
Tan / Li; 0 / 4	(China) Li Qing (0/1/0); Wife	1988 Seoul	Diving - Women's 3m Springboard (1988)	
Tian / Zhou; 1 / 2	(China) Tian Bingyi (0/0/1)	1992 Barcelona	Badminton - Men's Doubles (1992)	
Tian / Zhou; 1 / 2	(China) Zhou Jihong (1/0/0); Wife	1984 Los Angeles	Diving - Women's 10m Platform (1984)	
Becker / Uphoff; 5 / 6	(Germany) Otto Becker (1/0/1)	2000 Sydney, 2004 Athens	Equestrian - Team jumping (2000, 2004)	Later divorced
Becker / Uphoff; 5 / 6	(Germany) Nicole Uphoff (4/0/0); Wife	1988 Seoul, 1992 Barcelona, 1996 Atlanta	Equestrian - Individual dressage (1988, 1992), Team dressage (1988, 1992)	
Graf / Agassi; 2 / 3	(Germany) Steffi Graf (1/1/0)	1988 Seoul, 1992 Barcelona	Tennis - Women's Singles (1988, 1992)	
Graf / Agassi; 2 / 3	(United States) Andre Agassi (1/0/0); Husband	1996 Atlanta	Tennis - Men's Singles (1996)	
Henderson / Sanders; 3 / 5	(United States) Mark Henderson (1/0/0)	1996 Atlanta	Swimming - Men's 4 x 100m freestyle (1996)	Later divorced
Henderson / Sanders; 3 / 5	(United States) Summer Sanders (2/1/1); Wife	1992 Barcelona	Swimming - Women's 200m butterfly (1992), 200m individual medley (1992), 400m individual medley (1992), 4 x 100m medley (1992)	
Jiao / Ahn; 0 / 3	(China) Jiao Zhimin (0/1/1)	1988 Seoul	Table Tennis - Women's Singles (1988), Women's Doubles (1988)	
Jiao / Ahn; 0 / 3	(South Korea) Ahn Jae-hyung (0/0/1); Husband	1988 Seoul	Table Tennis - Men's Doubles (1988)	
O'Connor; 1 / 5	(United States) Karen O'Connor (0/1/1)	1996 Atlanta, 2000 Sydney	Equestrian - Team eventing (1996, 2000)	
O'Connor; 1 / 5	(United States) David O'Connor (1/1/1); Husband	1996 Atlanta, 2000 Sydney	Equestrian - Individual eventing (2000), Team eventing (1996, 2000)	
Sprague; 2 / 2	(United States) Ed Sprague Jr. (1/0/0)	1988 Seoul	Baseball (1988)	
Sprague; 2 / 2	(United States) Kristen Babb-Sprague (1/0/0); Wife	1992 Barcelona	Synchronized Swimming - Women's solo (1992)	
Teti / Worthington; 2 / 3	(United States) Mike Teti (0/1/0)	1988 Seoul, 1992 Barcelona	Rowing - Men's eight (1988)	
Teti / Worthington; 2 / 3	(Canada) Kay Worthington (2/0/0); Wife	1992 Barcelona	Rowing - Women's quad sculls (1992), eight (1992)	
Blasco / Fairbrother; 2 / 3	(Spain) Miriam Blasco (1/0/0)	1992 Barcelona	Judo - Women's 56 kg (1992)	Rivals in an Olympic Final, married later
Blasco / Fairbrother; 2 / 3	(United Kingdom) Nicola Fairbrother (0/1/0); Wife	1992 Barcelona	Judo - Women's 56 kg (1992)	
Budikusuma / Susanti; 2 / 3	(Indonesia) Alan Budikusuma (1/0/0)	1992 Barcelona	Badminton - Men's Singles (1992)	
Budikusuma / Susanti; 2 / 3	(Indonesia) Susi Susanti (1/0/1); Wife	1992 Barcelona, 1996 Atlanta	Badminton - Women's Singles (1992, 1996)	
Gebbink / Lewin; 1 / 2	(Netherlands) Leo Klein Gebbink (1/0/0)	1996 Atlanta	Field Hockey - Men's team (1996)	
Gebbink / Lewin; 1 / 2	(Netherlands) Jeannette Lewin (0/0/1); Wife	1996 Atlanta	Field Hockey - Women's team (1996)	
Kim; 1 / 2	(South Korea) Kim Byung-joo (0/0/1)	1992 Barcelona	Judo - Men's - 78 kg (1992)	
Kim; 1 / 2	(South Korea) Kim Mi-jung (1/0/0); Wife	1992 Barcelona	Judo - Women's - 72 kg (1992)	
Kim; 1 / 3	(South Korea) Kim Taek-soo (0/0/2)	1992 Barcelona	Table Tennis - Men's singles (1992), Men's doubles (1992)	
Kim; 1 / 3	(South Korea) Kim Jo-sun (1/0/0); Wife	1996 Atlanta	Archery - Women's team (1996)	
Konga / Bitok; 0 / 3	(Kenya) Pauline Konga (0/1/0)	1996 Atlanta	Athletics - Women's 5000m (1996)	
Konga / Bitok; 0 / 3	(Kenya) Paul Bitok (0/2/0); Husband	1992 Barcelona, 1996 Atlanta	Athletics - Men's 5000m (1992, 1996)	
Okuno / Asahara; 0 / 3	(Japan) Fumiko Okuno (0/0/2)	1992 Barcelona	Synchronized Swimming - Women's solo (1992), Duet (1992)	
Okuno / Asahara; 0 / 3	(Japan) Nobuharu Asahara (0/1/0); Husband	2008 Beijing	Athletics - Men's 4 x 100m relay (2008)	
Svatkovskiy / Skaldina; 1 / 3	(Unified Team at the Olympics) / (Russia) Dmitri Svatkovskiy (1/1/0)	1992 Barcelona, 2000 Sydney	Modern Pentathlon - Men's Team (1992), Men's Individual (2000)	Later divorced
Svatkovskiy / Skaldina; 1 / 3	(Unified Team at the Olympics) Oksana Skaldina (0/0/1); Wife	1992 Barcelona	Rhythmic Gymnastics - Individual all-around (1992)	
Imre / Kökény; 0 / 6	(Hungary) Géza Imre (0/2/2)	1996 Atlanta, 2004 Athens, 2016 Rio de Janeiro	Fencing - Épée team (2004, 2016), Épée individual (1996, 2016)	
Imre / Kökény; 0 / 6	(Hungary) Beatrix Kökény (0/1/1); Wife	1996 Atlanta, 2000 Sydney	Handball - Women's team (1996, 2000)	
Kim / Ra; 2 / 5	(South Korea) Kim Dong-moon (2/1/0)	1996 Atlanta, 2000 Sydney, 2004 Athens	Badminton - Mixed Doubles (1996), Men's Doubles (2000, 2004)	Rivals in an Olympic Final, married later
Kim / Ra; 2 / 5	(South Korea) Ra Kyung-min (0/1/1); Wife	1996 Atlanta, 2004 Athens	Badminton - Mixed Doubles (1996), Women's Doubles (2004)	
Phelps / McClure; 1 / 2	(United States) Jaycie Phelps (1/0/0)	1996 Atlanta	Gymnastics - Women's team (1996)	Later divorced
Phelps / McClure; 1 / 2	(United States) Brett McClure (0/1/0); Husband	2004 Athens	Gymnastics - Men's team (2004)	
Rego / Barros; 1 / 5	(Brazil) Emanuel Rego (1/1/1)	2004 Athens, 2008 Beijing, 2012 London	Volleyball - Men's beach (2004, 2008, 2012)	
Rego / Barros; 1 / 5	(Brazil) Leila Barros (0/0/2); Wife	1996 Atlanta, 2000 Sydney	Volleyball - Women's team (1996, 2000)	
Scheidt; 2 / 6	(Brazil) Robert Scheidt (2/2/1)	1996 Atlanta, 2000 Sydney, 2004 Athens, 2008 Beijing, 2012 London	Sailing - Laser (1996, 2000, 2004), Star (2008, 2012)	
Scheidt; 2 / 6	(Lithuania) Gintarė Scheidt (0/1/0); Wife	2008 Beijing	Sailing - Laser Radial (2008)	
Zadneprovskis; 1 / 4	(Lithuania) Andrejus Zadneprovskis (0/1/1)	2004 Athens, 2008 Beijing	Modern pentathlon - Men's (2004, 2008)	
Zadneprovskis; 1 / 4	(Lithuania) Laura Asadauskaitė (1/1/0); Wife	2012 London, 2020 Tokyo	Modern pentathlon - Women's (2012, 2020)	
Hu / Luo; 1 / 5	(China) Hu Jia (1/2/0)	2000 Sydney, 2004 Athens	Diving - Men's 10m platform (2000, 2004), 10m platform synchro (2000)	
Hu / Luo; 1 / 5	(China) Luo Xi (0/1/1); Wife	2008 Beijing, 2012 London	Synchronized Swimming - Team (2008, 2012)	
Lambert; 1 / 2	(Australia) Stephen Lambert (0/0/1)	2008 Beijing	Field Hockey - Men's team (2008)	
Lambert; 1 / 2	(Australia) Angie Skirving (1/0/0); Wife	2000 Sydney	Field Hockey - Women's team (2000)	
Newbery; 1 / 5	(Australia) Chantelle Newbery (1/0/1)	2004 Athens	Diving - Women's 10m platform (2004), 3m springboard synchro (2004)	Later divorced
Newbery; 1 / 5	(Australia) Robert Newbery (0/0/3); Husband	2000 Sydney, 2004 Athens	Diving - Men's 3m springboard synchro (2000, 2004), 10m platform synchro (2004)	
Turgeon / Cockburn; 0 / 4	(Canada) Mathieu Turgeon (0/0/1)	2000 Sydney	Gymnastics - Men's trampoline (2000)	
Turgeon / Cockburn; 0 / 4	(Canada) Karen Cockburn (0/2/1); Wife	2000 Sydney, 2004 Athens, 2008 Beijing	Gymnastics - Women's trampoline (2000, 2004, 2008)	
Yang; 3 / 6	(China) Yang Wei (3/2/0)	2000 Sydney, 2008 Beijing	Gymnastics - Men's Team (2000, 2008), All-around (2000, 2008), Rings (2008)	
Yang; 3 / 6	(China) Yang Yun (0/0/1); Wife	2000 Sydney	Gymnastics - Uneven Bars (2000)	
Du / Pang; 4 / 8	(China) Du Li (2/1/1)	2004 Athens, 2008 Beijing, 2016 Rio de Janeiro	Shooting - Women's 10m air rifle (2004, 2016), 50m rifle three positions (2008, 2016)	
Du / Pang; 4 / 8	(China) Pang Wei (2/0/2); Husband	2008 Beijing, 2016 Rio de Janeiro, 2020 Tokyo	Shooting - Men's 10m air pistol (2008, 2016, 2020), Mixed 10m air pistol team (2020)	
Emmons; 2 / 6	(United States) Matthew Emmons (1/1/1)	2004 Athens, 2008 Beijing, 2012 London	Shooting - Men's 50m rifle prone (2004, 2008), Men's 50m rifle three positions (2012)	
Emmons; 2 / 6	(Czech Republic) Kateřina Emmons (1/1/1) Wife	2004 Athens, 2008 Beijing	Shooting - Women's 10 metre air rifle (2004, 2008), Women's 50m rifle three positions (2008)	
Cai / Wang; 1 / 3	(China) Cai Yun (1/1/0)	2008 Beijing, 2012 London	Badminton - Men's doubles (2008, 2012)	
Cai / Wang; 1 / 3	(China) Wang Na (0/0/1); Wife	2008 Beijing	Synchronized Swimming - Team (2008)	
Le Péchoux / Boubakri; 1 / 3	(France) Erwann Le Péchoux (1/1/0)	2016 Rio de Janeiro, Tokyo 2020	Fencing - Foil team (2016), Men's team foil (2020)	
Le Péchoux / Boubakri; 1 / 3	(Tunisia) Inès Boubakri (0/0/1); Wife	2016 Rio de Janeiro	Fencing - Foil individual (2016)	
Mishin / Velikaya; 3 / 6	(Russia) Aleksey Mishin (1/0/0)	2004 Athens	Wrestling - Men's Greco-Roman 84 kg (2004)	
Mishin / Velikaya; 3 / 6	(Russia) / ROC Sofya Velikaya (2/3/0); Wife	2008 Beijing, 2012 London, 2016 Rio de Janeiro, 2020 Tokyo	Fencing - Women's individual sabre (2012, 2016, 2020), Team sabre (2016, 2020)	
Ostapenko / Komarova; 0 / 2	(Russia) Aleksey Ostapenko (0/0/1)	2008 Beijing	Volleyball - Men's team (2008)	Later divorced
Ostapenko / Komarova; 0 / 2	(Russia) Stanislava Komarova (0/1/0); Wife	2004 Athens	Swimming - Women's 200m backstroke (2004)	
Park; 5 / 7	(South Korea) Park Kyung-mo (2/1/0)	2004 Athens, 2008 Beijing	Archery - Men's individual (2004), Team (2004, 2008)	
Park; 5 / 7	(South Korea) Park Sung-hyun (3/1/0); Wife	2004 Athens, 2008 Beijing	Archery - Women's individual (2004, 2008), Team (2004, 2008)	
Taylor / Taurasi; 6 / 8	(Australia) Penny Taylor (0/2/0)	2004 Athens, 2008 Beijing	Basketball - Women's Team (2004, 2008)	
Taylor / Taurasi; 6 / 8	(United States) Diana Taurasi (6/0/0); Wife	2004 Athens, 2008 Beijing, 2012 London, 2016 Rio de Janeiro, 2020 Tokyo, 2024 Paris	Basketball - Women's Team (2004, 2008, 2012, 2016, 2020, 2024)	Defeated spouse in multiple Olympic Finals
Fesikov; 0 / 2	(Russia) Sergey Fesikov (0/0/1)	2012 London	Swimming - Men's 4 x 100m freestyle (2012)	
Fesikov; 0 / 2	(Russia) Anastasia Zuyeva (0/1/0) Wife	2012 London	Swimming - Women's 200m backstroke (2012)	
Fredericks; 0 / 2	(Australia) Lucinda Fredericks (0/1/0)	2008 Beijing	Equestrian - Team eventing (2008)	
Fredericks; 0 / 2	(Australia) Clayton Fredericks (0/1/0) Husband	2008 Beijing	Equestrian - Team eventing (2008)	
Holiday; 4 / 4	(United States) Lauren Holiday (2/0/0)	2008 Beijing, 2012 London	Football - Women's team (2008, 2012)	
Holiday; 4 / 4	(United States) Jrue Holiday (2/0/0); Husband	2020 Tokyo, 2024 Paris	Basketball - Men's team (2020, 2024)	
Kenny; 12 / 15	(United Kingdom) Jason Kenny (7/2/0)	2008 Beijing, 2012 London, 2016 Rio de Janeiro, 2020 Tokyo	Track cycling - Team sprint (2008, 2012, 2016, 2020), Individual sprint (2008, 2012, 2016), Keirin (2016, 2020)	
Kenny; 12 / 15	(United Kingdom) Laura Kenny (5/1/0); Wife	2012 London, 2016 Rio de Janeiro, 2020 Tokyo	Track cycling - Team pursuit (2012, 2016, 2020), Omnium (2012, 2016), Madison (2020)	
Meinhardt / Kiefer; 3 / 5	(United States) Gerek Meinhardt (0/0/2)	2016 Rio de Janeiro, 2020 Tokyo	Fencing - Men's team foil (2016, 2020)	
Meinhardt / Kiefer; 3 / 5	(United States) Lee Kiefer (3/0/0); Wife	2020 Tokyo, 2024 Paris	Fencing - Women's foil (2020, 2024), team foil (2024)	
Qin / He; 3 / 8	(China) Qin Kai (2/1/2)	2008 Beijing, 2012 London, 2016 Rio de Janeiro	Diving - Men's synchronized 3 metre springboard (2008, 2012, 2016), Men's 3 metre springboard (2008, 2012)	
Qin / He; 3 / 8	(China) He Zi (1/2/0); Wife	2012 London, 2016 Rio de Janeiro	Diving - Women's synchronized 3 metre springboard (2012), Women's 3 metre springboard (2012, 2016)	
Snowsill / Frodeno; 2 / 2	(Australia) Emma Snowsill (1/0/0)	2008 Beijing	Triathlon - Women's race (2008)	
Snowsill / Frodeno; 2 / 2	(Germany) Jan Frodeno (1/0/0); Husband	2008 Beijing	Triathlon - Men's race (2008)	
Stadnik; 0 / 5	(Ukraine) Andriy Stadnik (0/1/0)	2008 Beijing	Wrestling - Men's freestyle 66 kg (2008)	
Stadnik; 0 / 5	(Azerbaijan) Mariya Stadnik (0/2/2); Wife	2008 Beijing, 2012 London, 2016 Rio de Janeiro, 2020 Tokyo	Wrestling - Women's freestyle 48 kg (2008, 2012, 2016), Freestyle 50 kg (2020)	
Sukhorukov / Mamun; 1 / 2	(Russia) Alexandr Sukhorukov (0/1/0)	2008 Beijing	Swimming - Men's 4 × 200 m freestyle (2008)	
Sukhorukov / Mamun; 1 / 2	(Russia) Margarita Mamun (1/0/0); Wife	2016 Rio de Janeiro	Rhythmic Gymnastics - Individual all-around (2016)	
Xie / Lin; 2 / 3	(China) Xie Xingfang (0/1/0)	2008 Beijing	Badminton - Women's singles (2008)	
Xie / Lin; 2 / 3	(China) Lin Dan (2/0/0); Husband	2008 Beijing, 2012 London	Badminton - Men's singles (2008, 2012)	
Kromowidjojo / Weertman; 4 / 5	(Netherlands) Ranomi Kromowidjojo (3/1/0)	2008 Beijing, 2012 London	Swimming - Women's 50m freestyle (2012), 100m freestyle (2012), 4 x 100m freestyle (2008, 2012)	
Kromowidjojo / Weertman; 4 / 5	(Netherlands) Ferry Weertman (1/0/0); Husband	2016 Rio de Janeiro	Swimming - Men's 10 km open water (2016)	
Cozmiuc; 0 / 2	(Romania) Marius Cozmiuc (0/1/0)	2020 Tokyo	Rowing - Men's coxless pair (2020)	
Cozmiuc; 0 / 2	(Romania) Ionela Cozmiuc (0/1/0); Wife	Paris 2024	Rowing - lightweight double sculls (2024)	
Eaton; 2 / 3	(United States) Ashton Eaton (2/0/0)	2012 London, 2016 Rio de Janeiro	Athletics - Decathlon (2012, 2016)	
Eaton; 2 / 3	(Canada) Brianne Theisen-Eaton (0/0/1); Wife	2016 Rio de Janeiro	Athletics - Heptathlon (2016)	
Kipyegon / Kitum; 3 / 5	(Kenya) Faith Kipyegon (3/1/0)	2016 Rio de Janeiro, 2020 Tokyo, 2024 Paris	Athletics - Women's 1500m (2016, 2020, 2024), 5000m (2024)	
Kipyegon / Kitum; 3 / 5	(Kenya) Timothy Kitum (0/0/1); Husband	2012 London	Athletics - Men's 800m (2012)	
Tian / Zhang; 3 / 4	(China) Tian Qing (1/0/0)	2012 London	Badminton - Women's Doubles (2012)	
Tian / Zhang; 3 / 4	(China) Zhang Nan (2/0/1); Husband	2012 London, 2016 Rio de Janeiro	Badminton - Men's Doubles (2016), Mixed Doubles (2012, 2016)	
Vlasov / Kolobova; 2 / 3	(Russia) Roman Vlasov (2/0/0)	2012 London, 2016 Rio de Janeiro	Wrestling - Men's Greco-Roman 74 kg (2012), Greco-Roman 75 kg (2016)	
Vlasov / Kolobova; 2 / 3	(Russia) Violetta Kolobova (0/0/1); Wife	2016 Rio de Janeiro	Fencing - Women's team épée (2016)	
Willoughby; 0 / 2	(United States) Alise Willoughby (0/1/0)	2016 Rio de Janeiro	Cycling - Women's BMX racing (2016)	
Willoughby; 0 / 2	(Australia) Sam Willoughby (0/1/0); Husband	2012 London	Cycling - Men's BMX racing (2012)	
Bonnet / Desplanches; 0 / 2	(France) Charlotte Bonnet (0/0/1)	2012 London	Swimming - Women's 4 x 200m freestyle (2012)	
Bonnet / Desplanches; 0 / 2	(Switzerland) Jérémy Desplanches (0/0/1); Husband	2020 Tokyo	Swimming - Men's 200m individual medley (2020)	
Ali / De Grasse; 2 / 8	(United States) Nia Ali (0/1/0)	2016 Rio de Janeiro	Athletics - 100m hurdles (2016)	
Ali / De Grasse; 2 / 8	(Canada) Andre De Grasse (2/2/3); Husband	2016 Rio de Janeiro, 2020 Tokyo, 2024 Paris	Athletics - Men's 100m (2016, 2020), 200m (2016, 2020), 4 x 100m relay (2016, 2020, 2024)	
Margalis / Fink; 2 / 4	(United States) Melanie Margalis (1/0/0)	2016 Rio de Janeiro	Swimming - Women's 4 × 200 m freestyle (2016)	
Margalis / Fink; 2 / 4	(United States) Nic Fink (1/2/0); Husband	2020 Tokyo, Paris 2024	Swimming - Men's 100m breaststroke (2024), 4 x 100m medley (2024), mixed 4 x 100m medley (2024)	
Nagornyy / Spiridonova; 1 / 5	(Russia) / ROC Nikita Nagornyy (1/1/2)	2016 Rio de Janeiro, 2020 Tokyo	Gymnastics - Men's team (2016, 2020), All-around (2020), Horizontal bar (2020)	
Nagornyy / Spiridonova; 1 / 5	(Russia) Daria Spiridonova (0/1/0); Wife	2016 Rio de Janeiro	Gymnastics - Women's team (2016)	
Unruh; 0 / 3	(Germany) Lisa Unruh (0/1/1)	2016 Rio de Janeiro, 2020 Tokyo	Archery - Women's individual (2016), team (2020)	
Unruh; 0 / 3	(Germany) Florian Unruh (0/1/0); Husband	2024 Paris	Archery - Mixed team (2024)	
Xargay / Stewart; 3 / 4	(Spain) Marta Xargay (0/1/0)	2016 Rio de Janeiro	Basketball - Women's Team (2016)	
Xargay / Stewart; 3 / 4	(United States) Breanna Stewart (3/0/0); Wife	2016 Rio de Janeiro, 2020 Tokyo, 2024 Paris	Basketball - Women's Team (2016, 2020, 2024)	Defeated spouse in an Olympic Final
Yoka / Mossely; 2 / 2	(France) Tony Yoka (1/0/0)	2016 Rio de Janeiro	Boxing - Men's super heavyweight (2016)	
Yoka / Mossely; 2 / 2	(France) Estelle Mossely (1/0/0); Wife	2016 Rio de Janeiro	Boxing - Women's lightweight (2016)	
Wellbrock; 1 / 3	(Germany) Sarah Köhler (0/0/1)	2020 Tokyo	Swimming - Women's 1500m freestyle (2020)	
Wellbrock; 1 / 3	(Germany) Florian Wellbrock (1/0/1); Husband	2016 Rio de Janeiro, 2020 Tokyo	Swimming - Men's 1500m freestyle (2020), 10 km open water (2020)	
Apithy; 1 / 4	(France) Boladé Apithy (0/0/1)	2024 Paris	Fencing - Men's team sabre (2024)	
Apithy; 1 / 4	(France) Manon Brunet (1/1/1); Wife	2020 Tokyo, 2024 Paris	Fencing - Women's individual sabre (2020, 2024), team sabre (2020)	
Huang / Liu; 1 / 3	(China) Huang Yaqiong (1/1/0)	2020 Tokyo, 2024 Paris	Badminton - Mixed doubles (2020, 2024)	
Huang / Liu; 1 / 3	(China) Liu Yuchen (0/1/0); Husband	2020 Tokyo	Badminton - Men's doubles (2020)	
Lyles / Bromfield; 1 / 4	(United States) Noah Lyles (1/0/2)	2020 Tokyo, 2024 Paris	Athletics - Men's 100m (2024), 200m (2020, 2024)	
Lyles / Bromfield; 1 / 4	(Jamaica) Junelle Bromfield (0/0/1); Wife	2020 Tokyo	Athletics - Women's 4 x 400m (2020)	

=== Cousins ===
Family Gold Medal/ Total	Member (Gold/Silver/Bronze) Relationship	Olympics	Sports	Note
Flatow; 5 / 6	(German Empire) Alfred Flatow (3/1/0)	1896 Athens	Gymnastics - team parallel bars (1896), team horizontal bar (1896), parallel bars (1896), horizontal bar (1896)	
Flatow; 5 / 6	(German Empire) Gustav Flatow (2/0/0); Cousin	1896 Athens	Gymnastics - team parallel bars (1896), team horizontal bar (1896)	
Egan; 2 / 3	(United States) Walter Egan (1/0/0)	1904 St. Louis	Golf - Team (1904)	
Egan; 2 / 3	(United States) Chandler Egan (1/1/0); Cousin	1904 St. Louis	Golf - Individual (1904), Team (1904)	
Turnbull; 0 / 2	(United Kingdom) Philip Turnbull (0/0/1)	1908 London	Field hockey (1908)	
Turnbull; 0 / 2	(United Kingdom) Bertrand Turnbull (0/0/1); Cousin	1908 London	Field hockey (1908)	
Jamvold; 2 / 2	(Norway) Gunnar Jamvold (1/0/0)	1920 Antwerp	Sailing - 10 metres (1920)	
Jamvold; 2 / 2	(Norway) Peter Jamvold (1/0/0); Cousin	1920 Antwerp	Sailing - 10 metres (1920)	
Schjøtt; 2 / 2	(Norway) Trygve Schjøtt (1/0/0)	1920 Antwerp	Sailing - 10 metres (1920)	
Schjøtt; 2 / 2	(Norway) Halfdan Schjøtt (1/0/0); Cousin	1920 Antwerp	Sailing - 10 metres (1920)	
Pearce; 2 / 3	(Australia) Bobby Pearce (2/0/0)	1928 Amsterdam, 1932 Los Angeles	Rowing - Single sculls (1928, 1932)	
Pearce; 2 / 3	(Australia) Gary Pearce (0/1/0); Cousin	1964 Tokyo, 1968 Mexico City	Rowing - Eight (1968)	
d'Oriola; 6 / 10	(France) Pierre Jonquères d'Oriola (2/2/0)	1952 Helsinki, 1956 Melbourne, 1964 Tokyo, 1968 Mexico City	Equestrian - Individual jumping (1952, 1964), Team jumping (1964, 1968)	
d'Oriola; 6 / 10	(France) Christian d'Oriola (4/2/0); Cousin	1948 London, 1952 Helsinki, 1956 Melbourne	Fencing - Men's foil (1948, 1952, 1956), Team foil (1948, 1952, 1956)	
Mogyorossy; 0 / 4	(Hungary) Győző Mogyorossy (0/0/1)	1948 London	Gymnastics - Men's Team (1948)	
Mogyorossy; 0 / 4	(Hungary) János Mogyorósi-Klencs (0/1/3); Cousin	1948 London	Gymnastics - Men's Team (1948), Vault (1948), Floor Exercise (1948)	
Marin; 0 / 4	(Romania) Cornel Marin (0/0/2)	1976 Montreal, 1980 Moscow, 1984 Los Angeles	Fencing - Men's sabre team (1976, 1984)	
Marin; 0 / 4	(Romania) Marin Mustață (0/0/2); Cousin	1976 Montreal, 1980 Moscow, 1984 Los Angeles	Fencing - Men's sabre team (1976, 1984)	
Bojsen-Møller; 1 / 3	(Denmark) Jørgen Bojsen-Møller (1/0/1)	1980 Moscow, 1984 Los Angeles, 1988 Seoul, 1992 Barcelona	Sailing - Flying Dutchman (1988), (1992)	
Bojsen-Møller; 1 / 3	(Denmark) Jens Bojsen-Møller (0/0/1); Cousin	1992 Barcelona, 1996 Atlanta	Sailing - Flying Dutchman (1992)	
Kiptanui / Chelimo; 0 / 2	(Kenya) Moses Kiptanui (0/1/0)	1996 Atlanta	Athletics - Men's 3000m steeplechase (1996)	
Kiptanui / Chelimo; 0 / 2	(Kenya) Richard Chelimo (0/1/0); Cousin	1992 Barcelona	Athletics - Men's 10000m (1992)	
Lawanson / Akinradewo; 1 / 4	(United States) Ruth Lawanson (0/0/1)	1992 Barcelona	Volleyball - Women's team (1992)	
Lawanson / Akinradewo; 1 / 4	(United States) Foluke Akinradewo (1/1/1); Cousin	2012 London, 2016 Rio de Janeiro, 2020 Tokyo	Volleyball - Women's team (2012, 2016, 2020)	
Delmee / van der Weide; 3 / 5	(Netherlands) Jeroen Delmee (2/1/0)	1996 Atlanta, 2000 Sydney, 2004 Athens	Field Hockey - Men's team (1996, 2000, 2004)	
Delmee / van der Weide; 3 / 5	(Netherlands) Sander van der Weide (1/1/0); Cousin	2000 Sydney, 2004 Athens	Field Hockey - Men's team (2000, 2004)	
Scott-Arruda / Willoughby; 0 / 3	(United States) Danielle Scott-Arruda (0/2/0)	2008 Beijing, 2012 London	Volleyball - Women's team (2008, 2012)	
Scott-Arruda / Willoughby; 0 / 3	(United States) Kim Willoughby (0/1/0); Cousin	2008 Beijing	Volleyball - Women's team (2008)	
Mayer / Woods; 2 / 2	(Australia) Bronwyn Mayer (1/0/0)	2000 Sydney	Water Polo - Women's team (2000)	
Mayer / Woods; 2 / 2	(Australia) Taryn Woods (1/0/0); Cousin	2000 Sydney	Water Polo - Women's team (2000)	
Brouwer; 0 / 2	(Netherlands) Ronald Brouwer (0/1/0)	2004 Athens	Field Hockey - Men's team (2004)	
Brouwer; 0 / 2	(Netherlands) Matthijs Brouwer (0/1/0); Cousin	2004 Athens	Field Hockey - Men's team (2004)	
Sprenger; 0 / 4	(Australia) Nicholas Sprenger (0/1/0)	2004 Athens	Swimming – 4 × 200 m freestyle (2004)	
Sprenger; 0 / 4	(Australia) Christian Sprenger (0/2/1); Cousin	2008 Beijing, 2012 London	Swimming – 100m breaststroke (2012), 4 x 100m medley (2008, 2012)	
Zviadauri / Iliadis; 2 / 3	(Georgia (country)) Zurab Zviadauri (1/0/0)	2004 Athens	Judo - Men's 90 kg (2004)	
Zviadauri / Iliadis; 2 / 3	(Greece) Ilias Iliadis (1/0/1); Cousin	2004 Athens, 2012 London	Judo - Men's 81 kg (2004), 90 kg (2012)	
Van Niekerk / Kolbe; 1 / 2	(South Africa) Wayde van Niekerk (1/0/0)	2016 Rio de Janeiro	Athletics - Men's 400m (2016)	
Van Niekerk / Kolbe; 1 / 2	(South Africa) Cheslin Kolbe (0/0/1); Cousin	2016 Rio de Janeiro	Rugby Sevens - Men's team (2016)	
Nacuqu / Tuisova; 2 / 3	(Fiji) Waisea Nacuqu (1/1/0)	2020 Tokyo, 2024 Paris	Rugby Sevens - Men's team (2020, 2024)	
Nacuqu / Tuisova; 2 / 3	(Fiji) Josua Tuisova (1/0/0); Cousin	2016 Rio de Janeiro	Rugby Sevens - Men's team (2016)	
Škantár; 2 / 2	(Slovakia) Peter Škantár (1/0/0)	2016 Rio de Janeiro	Canoeing- C-2 (2016)	
Škantár; 2 / 2	(Slovakia) Ladislav Škantár (1/0/0); Cousin	2016 Rio de Janeiro	Canoeing- C-2 (2016)	
Singh; 0 / 3	(India) Gurjant Singh (0/0/2)	2020 Tokyo, 2024 Paris	Field Hockey - Men's team (2020, 2024)	
Singh; 0 / 3	(India) Simranjeet Singh (0/0/1); Cousin	2020 Tokyo	Field Hockey - Men's team (2020)	

=== Multiple ===
Family Gold Medal/ Total	Member (Gold/Silver/Bronze) Relationship	Olympics	Sports	Note
de Pourtalès; 3 / 6	(Switzerland) Hermann de Pourtalès (1/1/0)	1900 Paris	Sailing - 1 to 2 ton 1st race (1900), 1 to 2 ton 2nd race (1900)	
de Pourtalès; 3 / 6	(Switzerland) Hélène de Pourtalès (1/1/0); Wife	1900 Paris	Sailing - 1 to 2 ton 1st race (1900), 1 to 2 ton 2nd race (1900)	
de Pourtalès; 3 / 6	(Switzerland) Bernard de Pourtalès (1/1/0); Nephew	1900 Paris	Sailing - 1 to 2 ton 1st race (1900), 1 to 2 ton 2nd race (1900)	
Bogen / Gerevich; 7 / 14	(Austrian Empire) / (Hungary) Albert Bogen (0/1/0)	1912 Stockholm, 1928 Amsterdam	Fencing - Team sabre (1912)	
Bogen / Gerevich; 7 / 14	(Hungary) Erna Bogen-Bogáti (0/0/1); Daughter	1932 Los Angeles	Fencing - Foil, individual (1932)	
Bogen / Gerevich; 7 / 14	(Hungary) Aladár Gerevich (7/1/2); Son-in-law	1932 Los Angeles, 1936 Berlin, 1948 London, 1952 Helsinki, 1956 Melbourne, 1960 Rome	Fencing - Team sabre (1932, 1936, 1948, 1952, 1956, 1960), Sabre individual (1936, 1948, 1952), Foil team (1952)	
Bogen / Gerevich; 7 / 14	(Hungary) Pál Gerevich (0/0/2); Grandson	1972 Munich, 1980 Moscow	Fencing - Team sabre (1972, 1980)	
Homonnai / Markovits; 6 / 8	(Hungary) Márton Homonnai (2/1/0)	1928 Amsterdam, 1932 Los Angeles, 1936 Berlin	Water Polo (1928, 1932, 1936)	
Homonnai / Markovits; 6 / 8	(Hungary) Katalin Szőke (2/0/0); Daughter	1952 Helsinki, 1956 Melbourne	Swimming - 100 m Freestyle (1952), 4 x 100 m Freestyle (1952)	
Homonnai / Markovits; 6 / 8	(Hungary) Kálmán Markovits (2/0/1); Son-in law	1952 Helsinki, 1956 Melbourne, 1960 Rome	Water Polo (1952, 1956, 1960)	
Singh; 5 / 6	(India) Dhyan Chand (3/0/0)	1928 Amsterdam, 1932 Los Angeles, 1936 Berlin	Field Hockey (1928, 1932, 1936)	
Singh; 5 / 6	(India) Roop Singh (2/0/0); Brother	1932 Los Angeles, 1936 Berlin	Field Hockey (1932, 1936)	
Singh; 5 / 6	(India) Ashok Kumar Singh (0/0/1); Son	1972 Munich, 1976 Montreal	Field Hockey (1972)	
Ragno /Lonzi; 3 / 8	(Italy) Saverio Ragno (1/3/0)	1932 Los Angeles, 1936 Berlin, 1948 London	Fencing - Men's team épée (1932, 1936), individual épée (1936), team foil (1948)	
Ragno /Lonzi; 3 / 8	(Italy) Antonella Ragno-Lonzi (1/0/2; Daughter	1960 Rome, 1964 Tokyo, 1968 Mexico City, 1972 Munich	Fencing - Women's team foil (1960), individual foil (1964, 1972)	
Ragno /Lonzi; 3 / 8	(Italy) Gianni Lonzi (1/0/0); Son-in-law	1960 Rome, 1964 Tokyo, 1968 Mexico City	Water Polo (1960)	
Vandernotte; 0 / 4	(France) Fernand Vandernotte (0/0/1)	1932 Los Angeles, 1936 Berlin	Rowing - Coxed four (1936)	
Vandernotte; 0 / 4	(France) Marcel Vandernotte (0/0/1); Brother	1932 Los Angeles, 1936 Berlin	Rowing - Coxed four (1936)	
Vandernotte; 0 / 4	(France) Noël Vandernotte (0/0/2); Son	1936 Berlin	Rowing - Coxed pair (1936), Coxed four (1936)	
Keller / Walter / Omilade; 5 / 9	(Nazi Germany) Erwin Keller (0/1/0)	1936 Berlin	Field hockey (1936)	
Keller / Walter / Omilade; 5 / 9	(West Germany) Carsten Keller (1/0/0); Son	1972 Munich	Field hockey (1972)	
Keller / Walter / Omilade; 5 / 9	(West Germany) Andreas Keller (1/2/0); Grandson	1984 Los Angeles, 1988 Seoul, 1992 Barcelona	Field hockey - Men's team (1984, 1988, 1992)	
Keller / Walter / Omilade; 5 / 9	(Germany) Louisa Walter (1/0/0); Andreas' wife	2004 Athens	Field hockey - Wpmen's team (2004)	
Keller / Walter / Omilade; 5 / 9	(Germany) Natascha Keller (1/0/0); Granddaughter	2004 Athens	Field hockey - Women's team (2004)	
Keller / Walter / Omilade; 5 / 9	(Germany) Florian Keller (1/0/0); Grandson	2008 Beijing	Field hockey - Men's team (2008)	
Keller / Walter / Omilade; 5 / 9	(Germany) Navina Omilade (0/0/1); Florian's wife	2004 Athens	Football - Women's team (2004)	
Lunde / Arneberg; 2 / 6	(Norway) Eugen Lunde (1/0/0)	1936 Berlin	Sailing - 6 metre (1936)	
Lunde / Arneberg; 2 / 6	(Norway) Peder Lunde Sr. (0/1/0); Son	1952 Helsinki, 1956 Melbourne	Sailing - 5.5 metre (1952)	
Lunde / Arneberg; 2 / 6	(Norway) Vibeke Lunde (0/1/0); Daughter-in-law	1952 Helsinki	Sailing - 5.5 metre (1952)	
Lunde / Arneberg; 2 / 6	(Norway) Tor Arneberg (0/1/0); Vibeke's brother	1952 Helsinki	Sailing - 6 metre (1936)	
Lunde / Arneberg; 2 / 6	(Norway) Peder Lunde Jr. (1/1/0); Grandson	1960 Rome, 1968 Mexico City	Sailing - Flying Dutchman (1960), Star (1968)	
Montano; 3 / 14	(Italy) Aldo Montano (0/2/0)	1936 Berlin, 1948 London	Fencing - Team sabre (1936, 1948)	
Montano; 3 / 14	(Italy) Mario Aldo Montano (1/2/0); Son	1972 Munich, 1976 Montreal, 1980 Moscow	Fencing - Team sabre (1972, 1976, 1980)	
Montano; 3 / 14	(Italy) Carlo Montano (0/1/0); Nephew	1976 Montreal	Fencing - Team foil (1976)	
Montano; 3 / 14	(Italy) Mario Tullio Montano (1/1/0); Nephew	1972 Munich, 1976 Montreal	Fencing - Team sabre (1972, 1976)	
Montano; 3 / 14	(Italy) Tommaso Montano (0/1/0); Nephew	1976 Montreal	Fencing - Team sabre (1976)	
Montano; 3 / 14	(Italy) Aldo Montano (1/2/2); Grandson	2004 Athens, 2008 Beijing, 2012 London, 2020 Tokyo	Fencing - Individual sabre (2004), Team sabre (2004, 2008, 2012, 2020)	
Sieburger / Salas; 0 / 5	(Argentina) Enrique Sieburger Sr. (0/1/0)	1948 London	Sailing - 6 metre (1948)	
Sieburger / Salas; 0 / 5	(Argentina) Julio Sieburger (0/1/0); Brother	1948 London	Sailing - 6 metre (1948)	
Sieburger / Salas; 0 / 5	(Argentina) Enrique Sieburger Jr. (0/1/0); Son	1948 London	Sailing - 6 metre (1948)	
Sieburger / Salas; 0 / 5	(Argentina) Jorge del Río Sálas (0/1/0); Son-in-law	1960 Rome	Sailing - Dragon (1960)	
Sieburger / Salas; 0 / 5	(Argentina) Jorge Salas Chávez (0/1/0); J. del Río's cousin	1960 Rome	Sailing - Dragon (1960)	
Gyarmati / Székely / Hesz; 5 / 11	(Hungary) Dezső Gyarmati (3/1/1)	1948 London, 1952 Helsinki, 1956 Melbourne, 1960 Rome, 1964 Tokyo	Water Polo (1948, 1952, 1956, 1960, 1964)	
Gyarmati / Székely / Hesz; 5 / 11	(Hungary) Éva Székely (1/1/0); Wife	1952 Helsinki, 1956 Melbourne	Swimming - 200 m Breaststroke (1952, 1956)	
Gyarmati / Székely / Hesz; 5 / 11	(Hungary) Andrea Gyarmati (0/1/1); Daughter	1968 Mexico City, 1972 Munich	Swimming - 100 m Backstroke (1972), 100 m Butterfly (1972)	
Gyarmati / Székely / Hesz; 5 / 11	(Hungary) Mihály Hesz (1/1/0); Son-in law	1964 Tokyo, 1968 Mexico City	Canoeing - K-1 1000 metres (1964, 1968)	
Aihara; 2 / 6	(Japan) Nobuyuki Aihara (2/2/0)	1956 Melbourne, 1960 Rome	Gymnastics - Men's Team (1956, 1960), Floor Exercise (1956, 1960)	
Aihara; 2 / 6	(Japan) Toshiko Shirasu-Aihara (0/0/1) Wife	1960 Rome, 1964 Tokyo	Gymnastics - Women's Team (1964)	
Aihara; 2 / 6	(Japan) Yutaka Aihara (0/0/1) Son	1992 Barcelona	Gymnastics - Men's Team (1992)	
Dar / Zakauddin; 4 / 7	(Pakistan) Munir Ahmed Dar (1/2/0)	1956 Melbourne, 1960 Rome, 1964 Tokyo	Field Hockey (1956, 1960, 1964)	
Dar / Zakauddin; 4 / 7	(Pakistan) Tanvir Dar (1/0/0); Brother	1968 Mexico City, 1972 Munich	Field Hockey (1968)	
Dar / Zakauddin; 4 / 7	(Pakistan) Tauqeer Dar (1/0/0); Son	1984 Los Angeles	Field Hockey - Men's team (1984)	
Dar / Zakauddin; 4 / 7	(Pakistan) Khwaja Zakauddin (1/1/0); Tauqeer's father-in-law	1960 Rome, 1964 Tokyo	Field Hockey (1960, 1964)	
Rasool / Chaudhry; 1 / 5	(Pakistan) Chaudhry Ghulam Rasool (1/1/0)	1956 Melbourne, 1960 Rome	Field Hockey (1956, 1960)	
Rasool / Chaudhry; 1 / 5	(Pakistan) Akhtar Rasool (0/1/1); Son	1972 Munich, 1976 Montreal	Field Hockey (1972, 1976)	
Rasool / Chaudhry; 1 / 5	(Pakistan) Arshad Chaudhry (0/0/1); Nephew	1976 Montreal	Field Hockey (1976)	
Rastvorova / Grishin / Bida; 2 / 8	(Soviet Union) Valentina Rastvorova (1/2/0)	1956 Melbourne, 1960 Rome, 1964 Tokyo	Fencing - Women's individual foil (1960), team foil (1960, 1964)	
Rastvorova / Grishin / Bida; 2 / 8	(Soviet Union) Boris Grishin (0/1/1); Husband	1964 Tokyo, 1968 Mexico City	Water Polo (1964, 1968)	
Rastvorova / Grishin / Bida; 2 / 8	(Soviet Union) Yevgeny Grishin (1/0/1); Son	1980 Moscow, 1988 Seoul	Water Polo (1980, 1988)	
Rastvorova / Grishin / Bida; 2 / 8	ROC Sergey Bida (0/1/0); Grandson	2020 Tokyo	Fencing - Men's team épée (1960)	
Amat / Freixa / Escudé; 0 / 7	(Spain) Pedro Amat (0/0/1)	1960 Rome, 1964 Tokyo, 1968 Mexico City	Field Hockey (1960)	
Amat / Freixa / Escudé; 0 / 7	(Spain) Juan Amat (0/1/0); Brother	1968 Mexico City, 1972 Munich, 1976 Montreal, 1980 Moscow	Field Hockey - Men's Team (1980)	
Amat / Freixa / Escudé; 0 / 7	(Spain) Jaume Amat (0/1/0); Nephew	1992 Barcelona, 1996 Atlanta, 2000 Sydney	Field Hockey - Men's Team (1996)	
Amat / Freixa / Escudé; 0 / 7	(Spain) Santi Freixa (0/1/0); Jaume's cousin	2004 Athens, 2008 Beijing, 2012 London	Field Hockey - Men's Team (2008)	
Amat / Freixa / Escudé; 0 / 7	(Spain) Xavier Escudé (0/1/0); Santi's uncle	1988 Seoul, 1992 Barcelona, 1996 Atlanta	Field Hockey - Men's Team (1996)	
Amat / Freixa / Escudé; 0 / 7	(Spain) Pol Amat (0/2/0); Nephew	1996 Atlanta, 2000 Sydney, 2004 Athens, 2008 Beijing, 2012 London	Field Hockey - Men's Team (1996, 2008)	
Santos de Lamadrid; 0 / 3	(Spain) Joaquín Dualde (0/0/1)	1960 Rome	Field Hockey (1960)	
Santos de Lamadrid; 0 / 3	(Spain) Eduardo Dualde (0/0/1); Brother	1960 Rome, 1964 Tokyo	Field Hockey (1960)	
Santos de Lamadrid; 0 / 3	(Spain) Ignacio Macaya (0/0/1); Cousin	1960 Rome, 1964 Tokyo	Field Hockey (1960)	
Miyake; 2 / 6	(Japan) Yoshinobu Miyake (2/1/0)	1960 Rome, 1964 Tokyo, 1968 Mexico City, 1972 Munich	Weightlifting - 56 kg (1960), 60 kg (1964, 1968)	
Miyake; 2 / 6	(Japan) Yoshiyuki Miyake (0/0/1) Brother	1968 Mexico City	Weightlifting - 60 kg (1968)	
Miyake; 2 / 6	(Japan) Hiromi Miyake (0/1/1) Niece	2004 Athens, 2008 Beijing, 2012 London, 2016 Rio de Janeiro, 2020 Tokyo	Weightlifting - Women's 48 kg (2012, 2016)	
Glücksburg / Phillips; 2 / 4
Glücksburg / Phillips; 2 / 4	Constantine II of Greece (1/0/0)	1960 Rome	Sailing - Dragon (1960)	
Glücksburg / Phillips; 2 / 4	(United Kingdom) Zara Phillips (0/1/0); Third niece	2012 London	Equestrian - Team eventing (2012)	
Glücksburg / Phillips; 2 / 4	(United Kingdom) Mark Phillips (1/1/0); Zara's father	1972 Munich, 1988 Seoul	Equestrian - Team eventing (1972, 1988)	
Fábregas; 0 / 3	(Spain) Francisco Fábregas (0/1/0)	1968 Mexico City, 1972 Munich, 1976 Montreal, 1980 Moscow	Field Hockey (1980)	
Fábregas; 0 / 3	(Spain) Kiko Fábregas (0/1/0) Son	2000 Sydney, 2004 Athens, 2008 Beijing	Field Hockey - Men's team (2008)	
Fábregas; 0 / 3	(Spain) Alex Fàbregas (0/1/0) Nephew	2004 Athens, 2008 Beijing, 2012 London	Field Hockey - Men's team (2008)	
Meeuw / Weber / Buschschulte; 0 / 9	(West Germany) Folkert Meeuw (0/1/0)	1968 Mexico City, 1972 Munich, 1976 Montreal	Swimming - Men's 4 × 200 m freestyle (1972)	
Meeuw / Weber / Buschschulte; 0 / 9	(West Germany) Jutta Weber (0/0/2) Wife	1972 Munich, 1976 Montreal	Swimming - Women's 4 x 100m freestyle (1972), Women's 4 x 100m medley (1972)	
Meeuw / Weber / Buschschulte; 0 / 9	(Germany) Helge Meeuw (0/1/0) Son	2004 Athens, 2008 Beijing, 2012 London	Swimming - Men's 4 x 100m medley (2004)	
Meeuw / Weber / Buschschulte; 0 / 9	(Germany) Antje Buschschulte (0/0/5) Daughter-in-law	1996 Atlanta, 2000 Sydney, 2004 Athens, 2008 Beijing	Swimming - Women's 4 x 100m freestyle (1996), 4 × 200 m freestyle (2000, 2004), 200m backstroke (2004), 4 x 100m medley (2004)	
Rozier / Parot; 3 / 4	(France) Marcel Rozier (1/1/0)	1968 Mexico City, 1972 Munich, 1976 Montreal	Equestrian - Team jumping (1968, 1976)	
Rozier / Parot; 3 / 4	(France) Philippe Rozier (1/0/0) Son	1984 Los Angeles, 2012 London, 2016 Rio de Janeiro	Equestrian - Team jumping (2016)	
Rozier / Parot; 3 / 4	(France) Hubert Parot (1/0/0) Brother-in-law	1972 Munich, 1976 Montreal	Equestrian - Team jumping (1976)	
Behr / Funkenhauser; 3 / 9	(West Germany) Reinhold Behr (0/1/0)	1972 Munich, 1976 Montreal	Fencing - Men's team épée (1976)	
Behr / Funkenhauser; 3 / 9	(West Germany) Matthias Behr (1/3/0); Brother	1976 Montreal, 1984 Los Angeles, 1988 Seoul	Fencing - Men's team foil (1976, 1984, 1988), individual foil (1984)	
Behr / Funkenhauser; 3 / 9	(West Germany) Zita-Eva Funkenhauser (2/1/1); Matthias' wife	1984 Los Angeles, 1988 Seoul, 1992 Barcelona	Fencing - Women's team foil (1984, 1988, 1992), individual foil (1988)	
Dal Zotto / Borella; 4 / 6	(Italy) Fabio Dal Zotto (1/1/0)	1976 Montreal	Fencing - Men's individual foil (1976), Team foil (1976)	
Dal Zotto / Borella; 4 / 6	(Italy) Andrea Borella (2/0/0); Cousin	1984 Los Angeles, 1988 Seoul, 1992 Barcelona	Fencing - Men's team foil (1984)	
Dal Zotto / Borella; 4 / 6	(Italy) Francesca Bortolozzi-Borella (2/1/0); Andrea's wife	1988 Seoul, 1992 Barcelona, 1996 Atlanta	Fencing - Women's team foil (1988, 1992, 1996)	
Grael; 4 / 9	(Brazil) Torben Grael (2/1/2)	1984 Los Angeles, 1988 Seoul, 1996 Atlanta, 2000 Sydney, 2004 Athens	Sailing - Soling (1984), Star (1988, 1996, 2000, 2004)	
Grael; 4 / 9	(Brazil) Lars Grael (0/0/2); Brother	1988 Seoul, 1996 Atlanta	Sailing - Star (1988, 1996)	
Grael; 4 / 9	(Brazil) Martine Grael (2/0/0); Daughter	2016 Rio de Janeiro, 2020 Tokyo	Sailing - 49er FX (2016, 2020)	
Howard / Hill; 2 / 6	(United States) Sherri Howard (1/1/0)	1984 Los Angeles, 1988 Seoul	Athletics - 4×400 m relay (1984, 1988)	
Howard / Hill; 2 / 6	(United States) Denean Howard (1/2/0); Sister	1984 Los Angeles, 1988 Seoul, 1992 Barcelona	Athletics - 4×400 m relay (1984, 1988, 1992)	
Howard / Hill; 2 / 6	(United States) Virgil Hill (0/1/0); Denean's Husband	1984 Los Angeles	Boxing - Middleweight (1984)	
Janić / Dushev; 3 / 8	(Socialist Federal Republic of Yugoslavia) Milan Janić (0/1/0)	1984 Los Angeles	Canoeing - Men's K-1 1000m (1984)	
Janić / Dushev; 3 / 8	(Socialist Federal Republic of Yugoslavia) / (Hungary) Natasa Dusev-Janics (3/2/1); Daughter	2004 Athens, 2008 Beijing, 2012 London	Canoeing - Women's K-1 500m (2004), K-2 500m (2004, 2008, 2012), K-4 500m (2008), K-1 200m (2012)	
Janić / Dushev; 3 / 8	(Bulgaria) Andrian Dushev (0/0/1); Son-in-Law	1996 Atlanta	Canoeing - Men's K-2 1000m (1996)	
Joyner; 7 / 12	(United States) Al Joyner (1/0/0)	1984 Los Angeles	Athletics - Triple jump (1984)	
Joyner; 7 / 12	(United States) Florence Griffith Joyner (3/2/0); Wife	1984 Los Angeles, 1988 Seoul	Athletics - 200 m (1984, 1988), 100 m (1988), 4 × 100 m (1988), 4 × 400 m (1988)	
Joyner; 7 / 12	(United States) Jackie Joyner-Kersee (3/1/2); Sister	1984 Los Angeles, 1988 Seoul, 1992 Barcelona, 1996 Atlanta	Athletics - Heptathlon (1984, 1988, 1992), Long jump (1988, 1992, 1996)	
Laumann / Wallace; 1 / 5	(Canada) Daniele Laumann (0/0/1)	1984 Los Angeles	Rowing - Women's Double Sculls (1984)	
Laumann / Wallace; 1 / 5	(Canada) Silken Laumann (0/1/2); Sister	1984 Los Angeles, 1992 Barcelona, 1996 Atlanta	Rowing - Women's Double Sculls (1984), Single Sculls (1992, 1996)	
Laumann / Wallace; 1 / 5	(Canada) John Wallace (1/0/0); Brother-in-law	1992 Barcelona	Rowing - Men's Eight (1992)	
Rezende; 1 / 5	(Brazil) Bernardo Rezende (0/1/0)	1984 Los Angeles	Volleyball - Men's team (1984)	
Rezende; 1 / 5	(Brazil) Fernanda Venturini (0/0/1); Wife	1996 Atlanta	Volleyball - Women's team (1996)	
Rezende; 1 / 5	(Brazil) Bruno Rezende (1/2/0); Son	2008 Beijing, 2012 London, 2016 Rio de Janeiro	Volleyball - Men's team (2008, 2012, 2016)	
Rienks / van Ettekoven; 2 / 5	(Netherlands) Nico Rienks (2/0/1)	1988 Seoul, 1992 Barcelona, 1996 Atlanta	Rowing - Men's double scull (1988, 1992), eight (1996)	
Rienks / van Ettekoven; 2 / 5	(Netherlands) Harriet van Ettekoven (0/0/1); Wife	1984 Los Angeles	Rowing - Women's eight (1984)	
Rienks / van Ettekoven; 2 / 5	(Netherlands) Ralf Rienks (0/1/0); Son	2024 Paris	Rowing - Men's eight (2024)	
Capes / Hager; 2 / 3	(Australia) Lee Capes (1/0/0)	1988 Seoul	Field Hockey - Women's team (1988)	
Capes / Hager; 2 / 3	(Australia) Michelle Capes (1/0/0); Sister	1988 Seoul	Field Hockey - Women's team (1988)	
Capes / Hager; 2 / 3	(Australia) Mark Hager (0/0/1); Brother-in-law	1996 Atlanta	Field Hockey - Men's team (1996)	
Rusher / Eckert; 0 / 3	(United States) Jack Rusher (0/0/1)	1988 Seoul, 1992 Barcelona	Rowing - Men's eight (1988)	
Rusher / Eckert; 0 / 3	(United States) Cynthia Eckert (0/1/0); Wife	1988 Seoul, 1992 Barcelona	Rowing - Women's coxless four (1992)	
Rusher / Eckert; 0 / 3	(United States) Nicholas Rusher (0/0/1); Son	2024 Paris	Rowing - Men's eight (2024)	
Bryzghin/Bryzghina; 4 / 6	(Soviet Union) Viktor Bryzghin (1/0/0)	1988 Seoul	Athletics - 4x100m relay (1988)	
Bryzghin/Bryzghina; 4 / 6	(Soviet Union) / (Unified Team at the Olympics) Olha Bryzghina (3/1/0); Wife	1988 Seoul, 1992 Barcelona	Athletics - 4x100m relay (1988, 1992), 400 m (1988, 1992)	
Bryzghin/Bryzghina; 4 / 6	(Ukraine) Yelyzaveta Bryzghina (0/0/1); Daughter	2012 London, 2016 Rio de Janeiro	Athletics - 4x100m relay (2012)	
Carruthers / Powell; 4 / 5	(Australia) Stuart Carruthers (0/0/1)	1996 Atlanta	Field Hockey - Men's team (1996)	
Carruthers / Powell; 4 / 5	(Australia) Lisa Powell (2/0/0); Wife	1996 Atlanta, 2000 Sydney	Field Hockey - Women's team (1996, 2000)	
Carruthers / Powell; 4 / 5	(Australia) Katrina Powell (2/0/0); Sister-in-law	1996 Atlanta, 2000 Sydney	Field Hockey - Women's team (1996, 2000)	
Dibaba / Sihine / Tulu; 5 / 13	(Ethiopia) Tirunesh Dibaba (3/0/3)	2004 Athens, 2008 Beijing, 2012 London, 2016 Rio de Janeiro	Athletics - 5000 m (2004, 2008, 2012), 10,000 m (2008, 2012, 2016)	
Dibaba / Sihine / Tulu; 5 / 13	(Ethiopia) Ejegayehu Dibaba (0/1/0); Sister	2004 Athens	Athletics - 10,000 m (2004)	
Dibaba / Sihine / Tulu; 5 / 13	(Ethiopia) Sileshi Sihine (0/2/0); Husband	2004 Athens, 2008 Beijing	Athletics - 10,000 m (2004, 2008)	
Dibaba / Sihine / Tulu; 5 / 13	(Ethiopia) Derartu Tulu (2/0/1); Cousin	1992 Barcelona, 2000 Sydney, 2004 Athens	Athletics - 10,000 m (1992, 2000, 2004)	
Dibaba / Sihine / Tulu; 5 / 13	(Ethiopia) Genzebe Dibaba (0/1/0); Sister	2016 Rio de Janeiro	Athletics - 1500 m (2016)	
Rothenberger; 1 / 4	(Netherlands) Sven Rothenberger (0/1/1)	1996 Atlanta, 2004 Athens	Equestrian - Individual dressage (1996), Team dressage (1996)	
Rothenberger; 1 / 4	(Netherlands) Gonnelien Rothenberger (0/1/0); Wife	1996 Atlanta	Equestrian - Team dressage (1996)	
Rothenberger; 1 / 4	(Germany) Sönke Rothenberger (1/0/0); Daughter	2016 Rio de Janeiro	Equestrian - Team dressage (2016)	
Endres; 3 / 6	(Brazil) Gustavo Endres (1/1/0)	2004 Athens, 2008 Beijing	Volleyball - Men's team (2004, 2008)	
Endres; 3 / 6	(Brazil) Murilo Endres (0/2/0); Brother	2008 Beijing, 2012 London	Volleyball - Men's team (2008, 2012)	
Endres; 3 / 6	(Brazil) Jaqueline Carvalho (2/0/0); Sister-in-law	2008 Beijing, 2012 London	Volleyball - Women's team (2008, 2012)	
Harrison / Knowles / Dwyer / Gohdes; 2 / 8	(Australia) Regan Harrison (0/1/0)	2000 Sydney	Swimming - Men's 4 x 100 medley (2000)	
Harrison / Knowles / Dwyer / Gohdes; 2 / 8	(Australia) Mark Knowles (1/0/2); Cousin	2004 Athens, 2008 Beijing, 2012 London	Field Hockey - Men's team (2004, 2008, 2012)	
Harrison / Knowles / Dwyer / Gohdes; 2 / 8	(Australia) Jamie Dwyer (1/0/2); Mark's brother-in-law	2004 Athens, 2008 Beijing, 2012 London, 2016 Rio de Janeiro	Field Hockey - Men's team (2004, 2008, 2012)	
Harrison / Knowles / Dwyer / Gohdes; 2 / 8	(Australia) Matt Gohdes (0/0/1); Jamie's cousin	2012 London	Field Hockey - Men's team (2012)	
Rippon / Gynther; 0 / 5	(Australia) Rebecca Rippon (0/0/1)	2008 Beijing	Water Polo - Women's team (2008)	
Rippon / Gynther; 0 / 5	(Australia) Melissa Rippon (0/0/2); Sister	2008 Beijing, 2012 London	Water Polo - Women's team (2008, 2012)	
Rippon / Gynther; 0 / 5	(Australia) Kate Gynther (0/0/2); Step sister	2008 Beijing, 2012 London	Water Polo - Women's team (2008, 2012)	
O'Donovan / Hegarty; 2 / 5	(Republic of Ireland) Gary O'Donovan (0/1/0)	2016 Rio de Janeiro	Rowing - Men's lightweight double sculls (2016)	
O'Donovan / Hegarty; 2 / 5	(Republic of Ireland) Paul O'Donovan (2/1/0); Brother	2016 Rio de Janeiro, 2020 Tokyo, 2024 Paris	Rowing - Men's lightweight double sculls (2016, 2020, 2024)	
O'Donovan / Hegarty; 2 / 5	(Republic of Ireland) Emily Hegarty (0/0/1); Cousin	2020 Tokyo, 2024 Paris	Rowing - Women's coxless four (2020)	

=== Others ===
Family Gold Medal/ Total	Member (Gold/Silver/Bronze) Relationship	Olympics	Sports	Note
Antonsson; 0 / 3	(Sweden) Bertil Antonsson (0/2/0)	1948 London, 1952 Helsinki	Wrestling - Men's freestyle heavyweight (1948, 1952)	
Antonsson; 0 / 3	(Sweden) Hans Antonsson (0/0/1); Nephew	1960 Rome	Wrestling - Men's freestyle middleweight (1960)	
Khan; 2 / 5	(Pakistan) Motiullah Khan (1/2/0)	1956 Melbourne, 1960 Rome, 1964 Tokyo	Field Hockey (1956, 1960, 1964)	
Khan; 2 / 5	(Pakistan) Samiullah Khan (0/0/1); Nephew	1976 Montreal	Field Hockey (1976)	
Khan; 2 / 5	(Pakistan) Kaleemullah Khan (1/0/0); Nephew	1984 Los Angeles	Field Hockey - Men's team (1984)	
Horvat / Puc; 2 / 3	(Socialist Federal Republic of Yugoslavia) Hrvoje Horvat (1/0/0)	1972 Munich, 1976 Montreal	Handball - Men's team (1972, 1976)	
Horvat / Puc; 2 / 3	(Socialist Federal Republic of Yugoslavia) / (Croatia) / (Slovenia) Iztok Puc (1/0/1); Son-in-law	1988 Seoul, 1996 Atlanta, 2000 Sydney	Handball - Men's team (1988, 1996)	
Ishii / Swain; 0 / 2	(Brazil) Chiaki Ishii (0/0/1)	1972 Munich	Judo - 93 kg (1972)	
Ishii / Swain; 0 / 2	(United States) Mike Swain (0/0/1); Son-in-law	1984 Los Angeles, 1988 Seoul, 1992 Barcelona	Judo - 71 kg (1988)	
Juantorena; 2 / 3	(Cuba) Alberto Juantorena (2/0/0)	1972 Munich, 1976 Montreal, 1980 Moscow	Athletics - Men's 400m (1976), 800m (1976)	
Juantorena; 2 / 3	(Italy) Osmany Juantorena (0/1/0); Nephew	2016 Rio de Janeiro, 2020 Tokyo	Volleyball - Men's team (2016)	
Jenner / Odom; 1 / 2	(United States) Bruce Jenner (1/0/0)	1976 Montreal	Athletics - Men's decathlon (1976)	
Jenner / Odom; 1 / 2	(United States) Lamar Odom (0/0/1); Stepson-in-law	2004 Athens	Basketball - Men's team (2004)	
van Groningen; 1 / 3	(Romania) Valeria Răcilă (1/0/1)	1980 Moscow	Rowing - Women's double scull (1980), single scull (1984)	
van Groningen; 1 / 3	(Romania) Gianina van Groningen (0/1/0); Daughter-in-law	2016 Rio de Janeiro, 2020 Tokyo, 2024 Paris	Rowing - Women's lightweight double sculls (2024)	
Hahn; 0 / 2	(West Germany) Birgit Hahn (0/1/0)	1984 Los Angeles	Field Hockey - Women's team (1984)	
Hahn; 0 / 2	(Germany) Lisa Hahn (0/0/1); Niece	2016 Rio de Janeiro	Field Hockey - Women's team (2016)	
Li; 4 / 6	(China) Li Xiaoping (0/1/0)	1984 Los Angeles	Gymnastics - Men's Team (1984)	
Li; 4 / 6	(China) Li Xiaopeng (4/0/1); Son-in-law	2000 Sydney, 2004 Athens, 2008 Beijing	Gymnastics - Men's Team (2000, 2008), Parallel Bars (2000, 2004, 2008)	
Woodhouse / McKeon; 6 / 15	(Australia) Rob Woodhouse (0/0/1)	1984 Los Angeles	Swimming - Men's 4 x 100m freestyle (1984)	
Woodhouse / McKeon; 6 / 15	(Australia) Emma McKeon (6/3/5); Niece	2016 Rio de Janeiro, 2020 Tokyo, 2024 Paris	Swimming - Women's 200m freestyle (2016), 4 x 100m freestyle (2016, 2020, 2024), 4 x 200m freestyle (2016, 2020), 4 x 100m medley (2016, 2020, 2024), 50m freestyle (2020), 100m freestyle (2020), 100m butterfly (2020), Mixed 4 x 100m medley (2020, 2024)	
Beerbaum; 4 / 6	(Germany) Ludger Beerbaum (4/0/1)	1988 Seoul, 1992 Barcelona, 1996 Atlanta, 2000 Sydney, 2016 Rio de Janeiro	Equestrian - Individual jumping (1992), Team jumping (1988, 1996, 2000, 2016)	
Beerbaum; 4 / 6	(Germany) Meredith Michaels-Beerbaum (0/0/1); Sister-in-law	2016 Rio de Janeiro	Equestrian - Team jumping (2016)	
Savón; 3 / 4	(Cuba) Félix Savón (3/0/0)	1992 Barcelona, 1996 Atlanta, 2000 Sydney	Boxing - Heavyweight (1992, 1996, 2000)	
Savón; 3 / 4	(Cuba) Erislandy Savón (0/0/1); Nephew	2016 Rio de Janeiro	Boxing - Men's heavyweight (2016)	
Sotomayor; 1 / 3	(Cuba) Javier Sotomayor (1/1/0)	1992 Barcelona, 2000 Sydney	Athletics - Men's high jump (1992, 2000)	
Sotomayor; 1 / 3	(Azerbaijan) Lorenzo Sotomayor (0/1/0); Nephew	2016 Rio de Janeiro	Boxing - Men's light welterweight (2016)	
Merckx / Masso; 1 / 2	(Belgium) Axel Merckx (0/0/1)	2004 Athens	Cycling - Men's road race (2004)	
Merckx / Masso; 1 / 2	(Argentina) Luca Masso (1/0/0); Nephew	2016 Rio de Janeiro	Field Hockey - Men's team (2016)	
Bayley / Perkins; 2 / 3	(Australia) Ryan Bayley (2/0/0)	2004 Athens	Cycling - Men's sprint (2004), Keirin (2004)	
Bayley / Perkins; 2 / 3	(Australia) Shane Perkins (0/0/1); Brother-in-law	2012 London	Cycling - Men's sprint (2012)	
Triyatno / Juniansyah; 1 / 3	(Indonesia) Triyatno (0/1/1)	2008 Beijing, 2012 London	Weightlifting - 62 kg (2008), 69 kg (2012)	
Triyatno / Juniansyah; 1 / 3	(Indonesia) Rizki Juniansyah (1/0/0); Brother-in-law	2024 Paris	Weightlifting - 73 kg (2024)	
Savani / Travica; 0 / 2	(Italy) Cristian Savani (0/0/1)	2012 London	Volleyball - Men's Team (2012)	
Savani / Travica; 0 / 2	(Italy) Dragan Travica (0/0/1); Brother-in-law	2012 London	Volleyball - Men's Team (2012)	
Chourraut / Echaniz; 1 / 4	(Spain) Maialen Chourraut (1/1/1)	2012 London, 2016 Rio de Janeiro, 2020 Tokyo	Canoeing - Women's slalom K-1 (2012, 2016, 2020)	
Chourraut / Echaniz; 1 / 4	(Spain) Pau Echaniz (0/0/1); Stepson	2024 Paris	Canoeing - Men's slalom K-1 (2024)	

== Winter Olympics ==
Family Gold Medal/ Total	Member (Gold/Silver/Bronze) Relationship	Olympics	Sports	Note
Brunet; 4 / 6	(France) Andrée Brunet (2/0/1)	1924 Chamonix, 1928 St. Moritz, 1932 Lake Placid	Figure Skating - Pairs (1924, 1928, 1932)	
Brunet; 4 / 6	(France) Pierre Brunet (2/0/1); Husband	1924 Chamonix, 1928 St. Moritz, 1932 Lake Placid	Figure Skating - Pairs (1924, 1928, 1932)	
Carruthers; 0 / 2	(United Kingdom) Colin Carruthers (0/0/1)	1924 Chamonix	Ice Hockey (1924)	
Carruthers; 0 / 2	(United Kingdom) Eric Carruthers (0/0/1); Brother	1924 Chamonix	Ice Hockey (1924)	
Jackson; 2 / 2	(United Kingdom) William Jackson (1/0/0)	1924 Chamonix	Curling (1924)	
Jackson; 2 / 2	(United Kingdom) Laurence Jackson (1/0/0); Son	1924 Chamonix	Curling (1924)	
Julen; 2 / 2	(Switzerland) Anton Julen (1/0/0)	1924 Chamonix	Military Patrol (1924)	
Julen; 2 / 2	(Switzerland) Alfons Julen (1/0/0); Brother	1924 Chamonix	Military Patrol (1924)	
Mandrillon; 0 / 2	(France) Camille Mandrillon (0/0/1)	1924 Chamonix	Military Patrol (1924)	
Mandrillon; 0 / 2	(France) Maurice Mandrillon (0/0/1); Brother	1924 Chamonix	Military Patrol (1924)	
Schläppi; 2 / 2	(Switzerland) Alfred Schläppi (1/0/0)	1924 Chamonix	Bobsleigh (1924)	
Schläppi; 2 / 2	(Switzerland) Heinrich Schläppi (1/0/0); Brother	1924 Chamonix	Bobsleigh (1924)	
Heaton / Fiske; 3 / 8	(United States) Jennison Heaton (1/1/0)	1928 St. Moritz	Bobsleigh (1928); Skeleton (1928)	
Heaton / Fiske; 3 / 8	(United States) John Heaton (0/2/1); Brother	1928 St. Moritz, 1932 Lake Placid, 1948 St. Moritz	Skeleton (1928, 1948); Bobsleigh - Two-man (1928)	
Heaton / Fiske; 3 / 8	(United States) Billy Fiske (2/0/0); Brother-in-law	1928 St. Moritz, 1932 Lake Placid	Bobsleigh - Five-man (1928), Four-man (1932)	
Plaxton; 3 / 3	(Canada) Herbert Plaxton (1/0/0)	1928 St. Moritz	Ice Hockey (1928)	
Plaxton; 3 / 3	(Canada) Hugh Plaxton (1/0/0); Brother	1928 St. Moritz	Ice Hockey (1928)	
Plaxton; 3 / 3	(Canada) Roger Plaxton (1/0/0); Cousin	1928 St. Moritz	Ice Hockey (1928)	
Ruud; 2 / 4	(Norway) Sigmund Ruud (0/1/0)	1928 St. Moritz, 1932 Lake Placid, 1936 Garmisch-Partenkirchen	Ski Jumping (1928)	
Ruud; 2 / 4	(Norway) Birger Ruud (2/1/0); Brother	1932 Lake Placid, 1936 Garmisch-Partenkirchen, 1948 St. Moritz	Ski Jumping (1932, 1936, 1948)	
Sullivan; 2 / 2	(Canada) Frank Sullivan (1/0/0)	1928 St. Moritz	Ice Hockey (1928)	
Sullivan; 2 / 2	(Canada) Joe Sullivan (1/0/0); Brother	1928 St. Moritz	Ice Hockey (1928)	
Baier / Herber; 2 / 3	(Germany) / (Nazi Germany) Ernst Baier (1/1/0)	1932 Lake Placid, 1936 Garmisch-Partenkirchen	Figure Skating - Men's Singles (1936), Pairs (1936)	
Baier / Herber; 2 / 3	(Nazi Germany) Maxi Herber (0/1/0); Wife	1936 Garmisch-Partenkirchen	Figure Skating - Pairs (1936)	
Shea; 3 / 3	(United States) Jack Shea (2/0/0)	1932 Lake Placid	Speed skating - 500 m (1932), 1500 m (1932)	
Shea; 3 / 3	(United States) Jimmy Shea (1/0/0); Grandson	2002 Salt Lake City	Skeleton (2002)	
Stevens; 2 / 3	(United States) Paul Stevens (0/1/0)	1932 Lake Placid	Bobsleigh - Four-man (1932)	
Stevens; 2 / 3	(United States) Hubert Stevens (1/0/0); Brother	1932 Lake Placid	Bobsleigh - Two-man (1932)	
Stevens; 2 / 3	(United States) Curtis Stevens (1/0/0); Brother	1932 Lake Placid	Bobsleigh - Two-man (1932)	
Cattini; 0 / 2	(Switzerland) Ferdinand Cattini (0/0/1)	1936 Garmisch-Partenkirchen, 1948 St. Moritz	Ice hockey (1948)	
Cattini; 0 / 2	(Switzerland) Hans Cattini (0/0/1); Brother	1936 Garmisch-Partenkirchen, 1948 St. Moritz	Ice hockey (1948)	
Pausin; 0 / 2	(Austria) Ilse Pausin (0/1/0)	1936 Garmisch-Partenkirchen	Figure Skating - Pairs (1936)	
Pausin; 0 / 2	(Austria) Erik Pausin (0/1/0); Brother	1936 Garmisch-Partenkirchen	Figure Skating - Pairs (1936)	
Angst; 1 / 2	(Switzerland) Heinrich Angst (1/0/0)	1948 St. Moritz, 1956 Cortina d'Ampezzo	Bobsleigh - Four-man (1956)	
Angst; 1 / 2	(Switzerland) Max Angst (0/0/1); Brother	1956 Cortina d'Ampezzo	Bobsleigh - Two-man (1956)	
Dupree; 0 / 2	(United States) William Dupree (0/0/1)	1948 St. Moritz	Bobsleigh - Two-man (1948)	
Dupree; 0 / 2	(United States) Donald Dupree (0/0/1); Brother	1948 St. Moritz	Bobsleigh - Two-man (1948)	
Dürst; 0 / 2	(Switzerland) Hans Dürst (0/0/1)	1948 St. Moritz	Ice hockey (1948)	
Dürst; 0 / 2	(Switzerland) Walter Dürst (0/0/1); Brother	1948 St. Moritz, 1952 Oslo	Ice hockey (1948)	
Grogan / Wagner; 1 / 2	(United States) James Grogan (0/0/1)	1948 St. Moritz, 1952 Oslo	Figure Skating - Men's Singles (1952)	Later divorced
Grogan / Wagner; 1 / 2	(Canada) Barbara Wagner (1/0/0); Wife	1956 Cortina d'Ampezzo, 1960 Squaw Valley	Figure Skating - Pairs (1960)	
Kennedy; 0 / 2	(United States) Peter Kennedy (0/1/0)	1948 St. Moritz, 1952 Oslo	Figure Skating - Pair skating (1952)	
Kennedy; 0 / 2	(United States) Karol Kennedy (0/1/0); Sister	1948 St. Moritz, 1952 Oslo	Figure Skating - Pair skating (1952)	
Lohrer; 0 / 2	(Switzerland) Heini Lohrer (0/0/1)	1948 St. Moritz	Ice hockey (1948)	
Lohrer; 0 / 2	(Switzerland) Werner Lohrer (0/0/1); Brother	1948 St. Moritz	Ice hockey (1948)	
Nagy; 0 / 4	(Hungary) László Nagy (0/0/2)	1948 St. Moritz, 1952 Oslo, 1956 Cortina d'Ampezzo	Figure Skating - Pair skating (1952, 1956)	
Nagy; 0 / 4	(Hungary) Marianna Nagy (0/0/2); Sister	1948 St. Moritz, 1952 Oslo, 1956 Cortina d'Ampezzo	Figure Skating - Pair skating (1952, 1956)	
Molitor / Meyer; 0 / 3	(Switzerland) Karl Molitor (0/1/1)	1948 St. Moritz	Alpine skiing - Downhill (1948), Combined (1948)	
Molitor / Meyer; 0 / 3	(Switzerland) Antoinette Meyer (0/1/0); Wife	1948 St. Moritz	Alpine skiing - Slalom (1948)	
Schlunegger / Schild; 1 / 2	(Switzerland) Hedy Schlunegger (1/0/0)	1948 St. Moritz	Alpine skiing - Downhill (1948)	
Schlunegger / Schild; 1 / 2	(Switzerland) Martina Schild (0/1/0); Granddaughter	2006 Turin	Alpine skiing - Downhill (2006)	
Zábrodský; 0 / 2	(Czechoslovakia) Oldřich Zábrodský (0/1/0)	1948 St. Moritz	Ice hockey (1948)	
Zábrodský; 0 / 2	(Czechoslovakia) Vladimír Zábrodský (0/1/0); Brother	1948 St. Moritz, 1956 Cortina d'Ampezzo	Ice hockey (1948)	
Andersson-Tvilling; 0 / 2	(Sweden) Hans Andersson-Tvilling (0/0/1)	1952 Oslo, 1956 Cortina d'Ampezzo	Ice hockey (1952)	
Andersson-Tvilling; 0 / 2	(Sweden) Stig Andersson-Tvilling (0/0/1); Twin-brother	1952 Oslo, 1956 Cortina d'Ampezzo	Ice hockey (1952)	
Falk / Baran; 2 / 2	(West Germany) Paul Falk (1/0/0)	1952 Oslo	Figure Skating - Pair skating (1952)	
Falk / Baran; 2 / 2	(West Germany) Ria Baran (1/0/0); Wife	1952 Oslo	Figure Skating - Pair skating (1952)	
Öberg; 0 / 2	(Sweden) Hans Öberg (0/0/1)	1952 Oslo, 1956 Cortina d'Ampezzo	Ice hockey (1952)	
Öberg; 0 / 2	(Sweden) Carl-Göran Öberg (0/1/0); Brother	1960 Squaw Valley, 1964 Innsbruck, 1968 Grenoble	Ice hockey (1964)	
Brodeur; 2 / 3	(Canada) Denis Brodeur (0/0/1)	1956 Cortina d'Ampezzo	Ice hockey (1956)	
Brodeur; 2 / 3	(Canada) Martin Brodeur (2/0/0); Son	1998 Nagano, 2002 Salt Lake City, 2006 Turin, 2010 Vancouver	Ice hockey (2002, 2010)	
Cleary; 2 / 3	(United States) Bill Cleary (1/1/0)	1956 Cortina d'Ampezzo, 1960 Squaw Valley	Ice hockey (1956, 1960)	
Cleary; 2 / 3	(United States) Bob Cleary (1/0/0); Brother	1960 Squaw Valley	Ice hockey (1960)	
Jenkins; 3 / 5	(United States) Hayes Alan Jenkins (1/0/0)	1956 Cortina d'Ampezzo	Figure Skating - Men's Singles (1956)	
Jenkins; 3 / 5	(United States) David Jenkins (1/0/1); Brother	1956 Cortina d'Ampezzo, 1960 Squaw Valley	Figure Skating - Men's Singles (1956, 1960)	
Jenkins; 3 / 5	(United States) Carol Heiss Jenkins (1/1/0); Wife	1956 Cortina d'Ampezzo, 1960 Squaw Valley	Figure Skating - Women's Singles (1956, 1960)	
Christian / Nelson; 4 / 5	(United States) Bill Christian (1/0/0)	1960 Squaw Valley	Ice hockey (1960)	
Christian / Nelson; 4 / 5	(United States) Roger Christian (1/0/0); Brother	1960 Squaw Valley	Ice hockey (1960)	
Christian / Nelson; 4 / 5	(United States) Gordon Christian (0/1/0); Brother	1956 Cortina d'Ampezzo	Ice hockey (1956)	
Christian / Nelson; 4 / 5	(United States) Dave Christian (1/0/0); Son	1980 Lake Placid	Ice hockey (1980)	
Christian / Nelson; 4 / 5	(United States) Brock Nelson (1/0/0); Grandson	2026 Milano Cortina	Ice hockey (2026)	
Ludington; 0 / 2	(United States) Ronald Ludington (0/0/1)	1960 Squaw Valley	Figure skating - Pair skating (1960)	
Ludington; 0 / 2	(United States) Nancy Ludington (0/0/1); Wife	1960 Squaw Valley	Figure skating - Pair skating (1960)	
Protopopov / Belousova; 4 / 4	(Soviet Union) Oleg Protopopov (2/0/0)	1960 Squaw Valley, 1964 Innsbruck, 1968 Grenoble	Figure skating - Pair skating (1964, 1968)	
Protopopov / Belousova; 4 / 4	(Soviet Union) Ludmila Belousova (2/0/0); Wife	1960 Squaw Valley, 1964 Innsbruck, 1968 Grenoble	Figure skating - Pair skating (1964, 1968)	
Stenin; 0 / 3	(Soviet Union) Boris Stenin (0/0/1)	1960 Squaw Valley	Speed skating - 1500 m (1960)	
Stenin; 0 / 3	(Soviet Union) Valentina Stenina (0/2/0); Wife	1960 Squaw Valley, 1964 Innsbruck	Speed skating - 3000 m (1960, 1964)	
Emery; 2 / 2	(Canada) John Emery (1/0/0)	1964 Innsbruck	Bobsleigh - Two-man (1964)	
Emery; 2 / 2	(Canada) Vic Emery (1/0/0); Brother	1964 Innsbruck	Bobsleigh - Two-man (1964)	
Holík; 0 / 5	(Czechoslovakia) Jiří Holík (0/2/2)	1964 Innsbruck, 1968 Grenoble, 1972 Sapporo, 1976 Innsbruck	Ice hockey (1964, 1968, 1972, 1976)	
Holík; 0 / 5	(Czechoslovakia) Jaroslav Holík (0/0/1); Brother	1972 Sapporo	Ice hockey (1972)	
Joseph; 0 / 2	(United States) Ronald Joseph (0/0/1)	1964 Innsbruck	Figure Skating - Pair skating (1964)	
Joseph; 0 / 2	(United States) Vivian Joseph (0/0/1); Sister	1964 Innsbruck	Figure Skating - Pair skating (1964)	
Klapáč / Ledecká; 3 / 5	(Czechoslovakia) Jan Klapáč (0/1/1)	1964 Innsbruck, 1968 Grenoble	Ice hockey (1964, 1968)	
Klapáč / Ledecká; 3 / 5	(Czech Republic) Ester Ledecká (3/0/0); Granddaughter	2014 Sochi, 2018 Pyeongchang, 2022 Beijing	Alpine skiing - Super G (2018); Snowboarding - Parallel giant slalom (2018, 2022)	
Larsson; 0 / 3	(Sweden) Gunnar Larsson (0/1/1)	1968 Grenoble	Cross country - 15 km, 4 × 10 km	
Larsson; 0 / 3	(Sweden) Mats Larsson (0/0/1); Son	2006 Turin	Cross country - 4 × 10 km	
Cochran; 1 / 3	(United States) Barbara Cochran (1/0/0)	1972 Sapporo	Alpine skiing - Slalom (1972)	
Cochran; 1 / 3	(United States) Ryan Cochran-Siegle (0/2/0); Son	2022 Beijing, 2026 Milano Cortina	Alpine skiing - Super G (2022, 2026)	
Fernández; 1 / 2	(Spain) Francisco Fernández Ochoa (1/0/0)	1972 Sapporo	Alpine skiing - Slalom (1972)	
Fernández; 1 / 2	(Spain) Blanca Fernández Ochoa (0/0/1); Sister	1992 Albertville	Alpine skiing - Slalom (1992)	
Rodnina / Zaitsev; 5 / 5	(Soviet Union) Irina Rodnina (3/0/0)	1972 Sapparo, 1976 Innsbruck, 1980 Lake Placid	Figure skating - Pair skating (1972, 1976, 1980)	Later divorced
Rodnina / Zaitsev; 5 / 5	(Soviet Union) Alexander Zaitsev (2/0/0); Husband	1976 Innsbruck, 1980 Lake Placid	Figure skating - Pair skating (1976, 1980)	
Šikolová / Bauer; 0 / 4	(Czechoslovakia) Helena Šikolová (0/0/1)	1972 Sapporo	Cross-country - 5 km (1972)	
Šikolová / Bauer; 0 / 4	(Czech Republic) Lukáš Bauer (0/1/2); Son-in law	1998 Nagano, 2002 Salt Lake City, 2006 Turin, 2010 Vancouver, 2014 Sochi	Cross-country - 15 km (2006, 2010), 4 × 10 km relay (2010)	
Ulanov / Smirnova; 1 / 2	(Soviet Union) Alexei Ulanov (1/0/0)	1972 Sapparo	Figure skating - Pair skating (1972)	Later divorced; Defeated spouse in an Olympic Final
Ulanov / Smirnova; 1 / 2	(Soviet Union) Lyudmila Smirnova (0/1/0); Wife	1972 Sapparo	Figure skating - Pair skating (1972)	
Augusta; 0 / 2	(Czechoslovakia) Josef Augusta (0/1/0)	1976 Innsbruck	Ice hockey (1976)	
Augusta; 0 / 2	(Czechoslovakia) Patrik Augusta (0/0/1); Son	1992 Albertville	Ice hockey (1992)	
Gorshkov / Pakhomova; 2 / 2	(Soviet Union) Aleksandr Gorshkov (1/0/0)	1976 Innsbruck	Figure skating - Ice dance (1976)	
Gorshkov / Pakhomova; 2 / 2	(Soviet Union) Lyudmila Pakhomova (1/0/0); Wife	1976 Innsbruck	Figure skating - Ice dance (1976)	
Karponosov / Linichuk; 2 / 2	(Soviet Union) Gennadi Karponosov (1/0/0)	1976 Innsbruck, 1980 Lake Placid	Figure skating - Ice dance (1980)	
Karponosov / Linichuk; 2 / 2	(Soviet Union) Natalia Linichuk (1/0/0); Wife	1976 Innsbruck, 1980 Lake Placid	Figure skating - Ice dance (1980)	
Minenkov / Moiseeva; 0 / 4	(Soviet Union) Andrei Minenkov (0/1/1)	1976 Innsbruck, 1980 Lake Placid	Figure skating - Ice dance (1976, 1980)	
Minenkov / Moiseeva; 0 / 4	(Soviet Union) Irina Moiseeva (0/1/1); Wife	1976 Innsbruck, 1980 Lake Placid	Figure skating - Ice dance (1976, 1980)	
Oesterreich; 0 / 2	(East Germany) Rolf Oesterreich (0/1/0)	1976 Innsbruck	Figure skating - Pair skating (1976)	
Oesterreich; 0 / 2	(East Germany) Romy Kermer (0/1/0); Wife	1976 Innsbruck	Figure skating - Pair skating (1976)	
Wenzel / Weirather; 2 / 7	(Liechtenstein) Hanni Wenzel (2/1/1)	1976 Innsbruck, 1980 Lake Placid	Alpine skiing - Slalom (1976, 1980), giant slalom (1980), Downhill (1980)	
Wenzel / Weirather; 2 / 7	(Liechtenstein) Andreas Wenzel (0/1/1); Brother	1980 Lake Placid, 1984 Sarajevo	Alpine skiing - Giant slalom (1980, 1984)	
Wenzel / Weirather; 2 / 7	(Liechtenstein) Tina Weirather (0/0/1); Daughter	2018 Pyeongchang	Alpine skiing - Super G (2018)	
Carruthers; 0 / 2	(United States) Peter Carruthers (0/1/0)	1980 Lake Placid, 1984 Sarajevo	Figure skating - Pair skating (1984)	
Carruthers; 0 / 2	(United States) Kitty Carruthers (0/1/0); Sister	1980 Lake Placid, 1984 Sarajevo	Figure skating - Pair skating (1984)	
Gustafson; 3 / 5	(Sweden) Tomas Gustafson (3/1/0)	1980 Lake Placid, 1984 Sarajevo, 1988 Calgary, 1992 Albertville	Speed Skating - 5000 m (1984, 1988), 10000 m (1984, 1988)	
Gustafson; 3 / 5	(Sweden) Elisabet Gustafson (0/0/1); Wife	1998 Nagano, 2002 Salt Lake City	Curling - Women's team (1998)	
Heiden; 5 / 6	(United States) Eric Heiden (5/0/0)	1980 Lake Placid	Speed Skating - 500 m (1980), 1000 m (1980), 1500 m (1980), 5000 m (1980), 10000 m (1980)	
Heiden; 5 / 6	(United States) Beth Heiden (0/0/1); Sister	1980 Lake Placid	Speed Skating - 3000 m (1980)	
Kirvesniemi; 3 / 13	(Finland) Harri Kirvesniemi (0/0/6)	1980 Lake Placid, 1984 Sarajevo, 1992 Albertville, 1994 Lillehammer, 1998 Nagano	Cross-country - 4 × 10 km relay (1980, 1984, 1992, 1994, 1998), 15 km (1984)	
Kirvesniemi; 3 / 13	(Finland) Marja-Liisa Kirvesniemi (3/0/4); Wife	1984 Sarajevo, 1988 Calgary, 1994 Lillehammer	Cross-country - 5 km (1984, 1994), 10 km (1984), 20 km (1984), 30 km (1994), 4 × 5 km relay (1984, 1988)	
Mahre; 1 / 3	(United States) Phil Mahre (1/1/0)	1980 Lake Placid, 1984 Sarajevo	Alpine skiing - Slalom (1980, 1984)	
Mahre; 1 / 3	(United States) Steve Mahre (0/1/0); Twin-brother	1984 Sarajevo	Alpine skiing - Slalom (1984)	
Dean / Duchesnay; 1 / 4	(United Kingdom) Christopher Dean (1/0/1)	1984 Sarajevo, 1994 Lillehammer	Figure skating - Ice dance (1984, 1994)	
Dean / Duchesnay; 1 / 4	(France) Isabelle Duchesnay (0/1/0); Wife	1988 Calgary, 1992 Albertville	Figure skating - Ice dance (1992)	Later divorced
Dean / Duchesnay; 1 / 4	(France) Paul Duchesnay (0/1/0); Brother-in law	1988 Calgary, 1992 Albertville	Figure Skating - Ice dance (1992)	
Prock / Schlierenzauer; 1 / 7	(Austria) Markus Prock (0/2/1)	1984 Sarajevo, 1988 Calgary, 1992 Albertville, 1994 Lillehammer, 1998 Nagano, 2002 Salt Lake City	Luge - Men's singles (1992, 1994, 2002)	
Prock / Schlierenzauer; 1 / 7	(Austria) Gregor Schlierenzauer (1/1/2); Nephew	2010 Vancouver, 2014 Sochi, 2018 Pyeongchang	Ski Jumping - Men's normal hill individual (2010), Large hill individual (2010), Large hill team (2010, 2014)	
Huber; 2 / 5	(Italy) Norbert Huber (0/1/1)	1984 Sarajevo, 1992 Albertville, 1994 Lillehammer, 1998 Nagano	Luge - Doubles (1992, 1994)	
Huber; 2 / 5	(Italy) Wilfried Huber (1/0/0); Brother	1988 Calgary, 1992 Albertville, 1994 Lillehammer, 1998 Nagano, 2002 Salt Lake City, 2006 Turin	Luge - Doubles (1994)	
Huber; 2 / 5	(Italy) Günther Huber (1/0/1); Brother	1992 Albertville, 1994 Lillehammer, 1998 Nagano, 2002 Salt Lake City	Bobsleigh - Two-man (1994, 1998)	
Kashkarov / Kazakova; 2 / 2	(Soviet Union) Juri Kashkarov (1/0/0)	1984 Sarajevo, 1988 Calgary	Biathlon - Men's 4 × 7.5 km relay (1984)	
Kashkarov / Kazakova; 2 / 2	(Russia) Oksana Kazakova (1/0/0); Wife	1998 Nagano	Figure skating - Pair skating (1998)	
Makarov / Selezneva; 0 / 2	(Soviet Union) Oleg Makarov (0/0/1)	1984 Sarajevo, 1988 Calgary	Figure skating - Pair Skating (1984)	
Makarov / Selezneva; 0 / 2	(Soviet Union) Larisa Selezneva (0/0/1); Wife	1984 Sarajevo, 1988 Calgary	Figure skating - Pair Skating (1984)	
Ponomarenko / Klimova; 2 / 6	(Soviet Union) (Unified Team at the Olympics) Sergei Ponomarenko (1/1/1)	1984 Sarajevo, 1988 Calgary, 1992 Albertville	Figure skating - Ice dance (1984, 1988, 1992)	
Ponomarenko / Klimova; 2 / 6	(Soviet Union) (Unified Team at the Olympics) Marina Klimova (1/1/1); Wife	1984 Sarajevo, 1988 Calgary, 1992 Albertville	Figure skating - Ice dance (1984, 1988, 1992)	
Strolz; 3 / 5	(Austria) Hubert Strolz (1/1/0)	1984 Sarajevo, 1988 Calgary, 1992 Albertville	Alpine skiing - Giant slalom (1988), Combined (1988)	
Strolz; 3 / 5	(Austria) Johannes Strolz (2/1/0); Son	2022 Beijing	Alpine skiing - Combined (2022), Slalom (2022), Team (2022)	
Vasiliev / Valova; 2 / 4	(Soviet Union) Oleg Vasiliev (1/1/0)	1984 Sarajevo, 1988 Calgary	Figure skating - Pair Skating (1984, 1988)	Later divorced
Vasiliev / Valova; 2 / 4	(Soviet Union) Elena Valova (1/1/0); Wife	1984 Sarajevo, 1988 Calgary	Figure skating - Pair Skating (1984, 1988)	
Ylipulli; 1 / 2	(Finland) Jukka Ylipulli (0/0/1)	1984 Sarajevo	Nordic combined - individual (1984)	
Ylipulli; 1 / 2	(Finland) Tuomo Ylipulli (1/0/0); Brother	1988 Calgary	Ski Jumping - Team (1988)	
Grinkov / Gordeeva; 4 / 4	(Soviet Union) (Russia) Sergei Grinkov (2/0/0)	1988 Calgary, 1994 Lillehammer	Figure skating - Pair skating (1988, 1994)	Died suddenly at 28
Grinkov / Gordeeva; 4 / 4	(Soviet Union) (Russia) Ekaterina Gordeeva (2/0/0); Wife	1988 Calgary, 1994 Lillehammer	Figure skating - Pair skating (1988, 1994)	
Gordeeva / Kulik; 3 / 3	(Soviet Union) (Russia) Ekaterina Gordeeva (2/0/0)	1988 Calgary, 1994 Lillehammer	Figure skating - Pair skating (1988, 1994)	Later divorced
Gordeeva / Kulik; 3 / 3	(Russia) Ilia Kulik (1/0/0); Husband	1998 Nagano	Figure skating - Men's Singles (1998)	
Gordeeva / Pelletier; 3 / 3	(Soviet Union) (Russia) Ekaterina Gordeeva (2/0/0)	1988 Calgary, 1994 Lillehammer	Figure skating - Pair skating (1988, 1994)	
Gordeeva / Pelletier; 3 / 3	(Canada) David Pelletier (1/0/0); Husband	2002 Salt Lake City	Figure skating - Pair skating (2002)	
Acklin; 2 / 5	(Switzerland) Donat Acklin (2/1/1)	1988 Calgary, 1992 Albertville, 1994 Lillehammer	Bobsleigh - Two-man (1992, 1994), Four-man (1992, 1994)	
Acklin; 2 / 5	(Switzerland) Guido Acklin (0/1/0); Brother	1994 Lillehammer, 1998 Nagano, 2002 Salt Lake City	Bobsleigh - Two-man (1994)	
Gstrein; 0 / 2	(Austria) Bernhard Gstrein (0/1/0)	1988 Calgary	Alpine skiing - Combined (1988)	
Gstrein; 0 / 2	(Austria) Fabio Gstrein (0/0/1); Cousin	2026 Milano Cortina	Alpine skiing - Slalom (2026)	
Mayer; 3 / 5	(Austria) Helmut Mayer (0/1/0)	1988 Calgary	Alpine skiing - Super G (1988)	
Mayer; 3 / 5	(Austria) Matthias Mayer (3/0/1); Son	2014 Sochi, 2018 Pyeongchang, 2022 Beijing	Alpine skiing - Super G (2018, 2022), Downhill (2014, 2022)	
Velzeboer; 4 / 6	(Netherlands) Monique Velzeboer (1/1/1)	1988 Calgary	Short track - Women's 500m (1988), 1000m (1988), 1500m (1988)	
Velzeboer; 4 / 6	(Netherlands) Xandra Velzeboer (3/0/0); Niece	2022 Beijing, 2026 Milano Cortina	Short track - Women's 3000m relay (2022), 500m (2026), 1000 (2026)	
Petrov / Chen; 0 / 3	(Unified Team at the Olympics) Denis Petrov (0/1/0)	1992 Albertville	Figure skating - Pair skating (1992)	
Petrov / Chen; 0 / 3	(China) Chen Lu (0/0/2); Wife	1992 Albertville, 1994 Lillehammer, 1998 Nagano	Figure skating - Women's Singles (1994, 1998)	
Zhulin / Usova; 0 / 4	(Unified Team at the Olympics) (Russia) Alexander Zhulin (0/1/1)	1992 Albertville, 1994 Lillehammer	Figure skating - Ice dance (1992, 1994)	Later divorced
Zhulin / Usova; 0 / 4	(Unified Team at the Olympics) (Russia) Maya Usova (0/1/1); Wife	1992 Albertville, 1994 Lillehammer	Figure skating - Ice dance (1992, 1994)	
Zhulin / Navka; 1 / 3	(Unified Team at the Olympics) (Russia) Alexander Zhulin (0/1/1)	1992 Albertville, 1994 Lillehammer	Figure skating - Ice dance (1992, 1994)	Later divorced
Zhulin / Navka; 1 / 3	(Belarus) (Russia) Tatiana Navka (1/0/0); Wife	1994 Lillehammer, 1998 Nagano, 2002 Salt Lake City, 2006 Turin	Figure skating - Ice dance (2006)	
Di Centa; 4 / 10	(Italy) Manuela Di Centa (2/2/3)	1992 Albertville, 1994 Lillehammer, 1998 Nagano	Cross-country skiing - 5 km (1994), 15 km (1994), Pursuit (1994), 30 km (1994), Relay (1992, 1994, 1998)	
Di Centa; 4 / 10	(Italy) Giorgio Di Centa (2/1/0); Brother	2002 Salt Lake City, 2006 Turin	Cross-country skiing - Relay (2002, 2006), 50 km (2006)	
Bjørndalen / Domracheva; 12 / 19	(Norway) Ole Einar Bjørndalen (8/4/1)	1994 Lillehammer, 1998 Nagano, 2002 Salt Lake City, 2006 Turin, 2010 Vancouver, 2014 Sochi	Biathlon - Individual, Sprint, Pursuit, Mass start, Relay, Mixed relay	
Bjørndalen / Domracheva; 12 / 19	(Belarus) Darya Domracheva (4/1/1); Wife	2010 Vancouver, 2014 Sochi, 2018 Pyeongchang	Biathlon - Individual, Pursuit, Mass start, Relay	
Jönsson; 4 / 4	(Sweden) Jörgen Jönsson (2/0/0)	1994 Lillehammer, 2006 Turin	Ice hockey (1994, 2006)	
Jönsson; 4 / 4	(Sweden) Kenny Jönsson (2/0/0); Brother	1994 Lillehammer, 2006 Turin	Ice hockey (1994, 2006)	
Kapanen; 0 / 3	(Finland) Sami Kapanen (0/0/2)	1994 Lillehammer, 1998 Nagano	Ice hockey - Men's team (1994, 1998)	
Kapanen; 0 / 3	(Finland) Oliver Kapanen (0/0/1); Nephew	2026 Milano Cortina	Ice hockey - Men's team (2026)	
Kiprusoff; 0 / 2	(Finland) Marko Kiprusoff (0/0/1)	1994 Lillehammer	Ice hockey - Men's team (1994)	
Kiprusoff; 0 / 2	(Finland) Miikka Kiprusoff (0/0/1); Brother	2010 Vancouver	Ice hockey - Men's team (2010)	
Koivu; 0 / 6	(Finland) Saku Koivu (0/1/3)	1994 Lillehammer, 1998 Nagano, 2006 Turin, 2010 Vancouver	Ice hockey - Men's team (1994, 1998, 2006, 2010)	
Koivu; 0 / 6	(Finland) Mikko Koivu (0/1/1); Brother	2006 Turin, 2010 Vancouver	Ice hockey - Men's team (2006, 2010)	
Kostner; 0 / 4	(Italy) Isolde Kostner (0/1/2)	1994 Lillehammer, 1998 Nagano, 2002 Salt Lake City	Alpine skiing - Women's Downhill (1994, 2002), Super-G (1994)	
Kostner; 0 / 4	(Italy) Carolina Kostner (0/0/1); Cousin	2006 Turin, 2010 Vancouver, 2014 Sochi, 2018 Pyeongchang	Figure skating - Women's Singles (2014)	
Hürlimann / Schwaller; 1 / 5	(Switzerland) Patrick Hürlimann (1/0/0)	1998 Nagano	Curling - Men's team (1998)	
Hürlimann / Schwaller; 1 / 5	(Switzerland) Yannick Schwaller (0/0/1); Son-in-law	2026 Milano Cortina	Curling - Men's team (2026)	
Hürlimann / Schwaller; 1 / 5	(Switzerland) Christof Schwaller (0/0/1); Yannick's Father	2002 Salt Lake City	Curling - Men's team (2002)	
Hürlimann / Schwaller; 1 / 5	(Switzerland) Kim Schwaller (0/0/1); Christof's Son	2026 Milano Cortina	Curling - Men's team (2026)	
Hürlimann / Schwaller; 1 / 5	(Switzerland) Andreas Schwaller (0/0/1); Christof's Brother	2002 Salt Lake City	Curling - Men's team (2002)	
Hefford / Kauth; 4 / 6	(Canada) Jayna Hefford (4/1/0)	1998 Nagano, 2002 Salt Lake City, 2006 Turin, 2010 Vancouver, 2014 Sochi	Ice hockey (1998, 2002, 2006, 2010, 2014)	
Hefford / Kauth; 4 / 6	(United States) Kathleen Kauth (0/0/1); Wife	2006 Turin	Ice hockey (2006)	
Goncharov / Grushina; 0 / 2	(Ukraine) Ruslan Goncharov (0/0/1)	1998 Nagano, 2002 Salt Lake City, 2006 Turin	Figure skating - Ice dance (2006)	Later divorced
Goncharov / Grushina; 0 / 2	(Ukraine) Elena Grushina (0/0/1); Wife	1998 Nagano, 2002 Salt Lake City, 2006 Turin	Figure skating - Ice dance (2006)	
Lobacheva / Averbukh; 0 / 2	(Russia) Irina Lobacheva (0/1/0)	1998 Nagano, 2002 Salt Lake City	Figure skating - Ice dance (2002)	Later divorced
Lobacheva / Averbukh; 0 / 2	(Russia) Ilia Averbukh (0/1/0); Husband	1998 Nagano, 2002 Salt Lake City	Figure skating - Ice dance (2002)	
Manninen; 1 / 4	(Finland) Hannu Manninen (1/1/1)	1998 Nagano, 2002 Salt Lake City, 2006 Turin	Nordic combined - Team (1998, 2002, 2006)	
Manninen; 1 / 4	(Finland) Pirjo Muranen (0/0/1); Sister	2010 Vancouver	Cross country - 4 x 5 km (2010)	
Poirée / Skjelbreid / Gjelland; 1 / 10	(France) Raphaël Poirée (0/1/2)	1998 Nagano, 2002 Salt Lake City, 2006 Turin	Biathlon - 12.5 km pursuit (2002), 4 × 7.5 km relay (2002, 2006)	Later divorced
Poirée / Skjelbreid / Gjelland; 1 / 10	(Norway) Liv Grete Skjelbreid (0/2/1); Wife	1998 Nagano, 2002 Salt Lake City, 2006 Turin	Biathlon - 15 km individual (2002), 4 × 7.5 km relay (1998, 2002)	
Poirée / Skjelbreid / Gjelland; 1 / 10	(Norway) Ann-Elen Skjelbreid (0/1/1); Sister of Liv Grete	1994 Lillehammer, 1998 Nagano, 2002 Salt Lake City	4 × 7.5 km relay (1998, 2002)	
Poirée / Skjelbreid / Gjelland; 1 / 10	(Norway) Egil Gjelland (1/1/0); Husband of Ann-Elen	1998 Nagano, 2002 Salt Lake City	4 × 7.5 km relay (1998, 2002)	
Ramsfjell; 1 / 2	(Norway) Eigil Ramsfjell (0/0/1)	1998 Nagano	Curling - Men's Team (1998)	
Ramsfjell; 1 / 2	(Norway) Bent Ånund Ramsfjell (1/0/0); Brother	2002 Salt Lake City	Curling - Men's Team (2002)	
Roth; 0 / 3	(Switzerland) Colette Brand (0/0/1)	1998 Nagano	Freestyle skiing - Women's aerials (1998)	
Roth; 0 / 3	(Switzerland) Noé Roth (0/2/0); Son	2026 Milano Cortina	Freestyle skiing - Men's aerials (2026), mixed team aerials (2026)	
Yagudin / Totmianina; 2 / 2	(Russia) Alexei Yagudin (1/0/0)	1998 Nagano, 2002 Salt Lake City	Figure skating - Men's Singles (2002)	
Yagudin / Totmianina; 2 / 2	(Russia) Tatiana Totmianina (1/0/0); Wife	2002 Salt Lake City, 2006 Turin	Figure skating - Pair skating (2006)	
Zhao / Shen; 2 / 6	(China) Zhao Hongbo (1/0/2)	1998 Nagano, 2002 Salt Lake City, 2006 Turin, 2010 Vancouver	Figure skating - Pair skating (2002, 2006, 2010)	
Zhao / Shen; 2 / 6	(China) Shen Xue (1/0/2); Wife	1998 Nagano, 2002 Salt Lake City, 2006 Turin, 2010 Vancouver	Figure skating - Pair skating (2002, 2006, 2010)	
Buraas / Sjåstad Christiansen; 2 / 5	(Norway) Hans Petter Buraas (1/0/0)	1998 Nagano, 2006 Turin	Alpine skiing - Men's slalom (1998)	
Buraas / Sjåstad Christiansen; 2 / 5	(Norway) Vetle Sjåstad Christiansen (1/2/1); Brother-in-law	2022 Beijing, 2026 Milano Cortina	Biathlon - Men's sprint (2026), Mass start (2022), Relay (2022, 2026)	
Hjelmeset / Kirkeeide; 1 / 5	(Norway) Odd-Bjørn Hjelmeset (0/1/1)	2002 Salt Lake City, 2006 Turin, 2010 Vancouver	Cross-Country Skiing - Men's 50 km freestyle (2002), Relay (2010)	
Hjelmeset / Kirkeeide; 1 / 5	(Norway) Maren Kirkeeide (1/1/1); Niece	2026 Milano Cortina	Biathlon - Women's sprint (2026), pursuit (2026), relay (2026)	
Kostelić; 4 / 10	(Croatia) Janica Kostelić (4/2/0)	2002 Salt Lake City, 2006 Turin	Alpine skiing - Slalom (2002), giant slalom (2002), Super-G (2002, 2006), Combined (2002, 2006)	
Kostelić; 4 / 10	(Croatia) Ivica Kostelić (0/4/0); Brother	2006 Turin, 2010 Vancouver, 2014 Sochi	Alpine skiing - Slalom (2006), Combined (2006, 2010, 2014)	
Kostomarov / Domnina; 1 / 2	(Russia) Roman Kostomarov (1/0/0)	2002 Salt Lake City, 2006 Turin	Figure skating - Ice dance (2006)	
Kostomarov / Domnina; 1 / 2	(Russia) Oksana Domnina (0/0/1); Wife	2006 Turin, 2010 Vancouver	Figure skating - Ice dance (2010)	
Ouellette / Chu; 4 / 8	(Canada) Caroline Ouellette (4/0/0)	2002 Salt Lake City, 2006 Turin, 2010 Vancouver, 2014 Sochi	Ice hockey (2002, 2006, 2010, 2014)	Defeated spouse in multiple Olympic Finals
Ouellette / Chu; 4 / 8	(United States) Julie Chu (0/3/1); Wife	2002 Salt Lake City, 2006 Turin, 2010 Vancouver, 2014 Sochi	Ice hockey (2002, 2006, 2010, 2014)	
Schoch; 2 / 3	(Switzerland) Simon Schoch (0/1/0)	2002 Salt Lake City, 2006 Turin, 2010 Vancouver, 2014 Sochi	Snowboarding - Men's parallel giant slalom (2006)	
Schoch; 2 / 3	(Switzerland) Philipp Schoch (2/0/0); Brother	2002 Salt Lake City, 2006 Turin, 2014 Sochi	Snowboarding - Men's parallel giant slalom (2002, 2006)	
Tkachuk; 2 / 3	(United States) Keith Tkachuk (0/1/0)	2002 Salt Lake City	Ice hockey - Men's team (2002)	
Tkachuk; 2 / 3	(United States) Matthew Tkachuk (1/0/0); Son	2026 Milano Cortina	Ice hockey - Men's team (2026)	
Tkachuk; 2 / 3	(United States) Brady Tkachuk (1/0/0); Son	2026 Milano Cortina	Ice hockey - Men's team (2026)	
Tong / Pang; 0 / 2	(China) Tong Jian (0/1/0)	2002 Salt Lake City, 2006 Turin, 2010 Vancouver, 2014 Sochi	Figure skating - Pair skating (2010)	
Tong / Pang; 0 / 2	(China) Pang Qing (0/1/0); Wife	2002 Salt Lake City, 2006 Turin, 2010 Vancouver, 2014 Sochi	Figure skating - Pair skating (2010)	
Apps / Duggan; 4 / 6	(Canada) Gillian Apps (3/0/0)	2006 Turin, 2010 Vancouver, 2014 Sochi	Ice hockey (2006, 2010, 2014)	Defeated spouse in multiple Olympic Finals
Apps / Duggan; 4 / 6	(United States) Meghan Duggan (1/2/0); Wife	2010 Vancouver, 2014 Sochi, 2018 Pyeongchang	Ice hockey (2010, 2014, 2018)	
Bergström; 3 / 3	(Sweden) Anna Bergström (2/0/0)	2006 Turin, 2010 Vancouver	Curling - Women's Team (2006, 2010)	
Bergström; 3 / 3	(Sweden) Kajsa Bergström (1/0/); Sister	2010 Vancouver	Curling - Women's Team (2010)	
Fredriksson; 1 / 3	(Sweden) Thobias Fredriksson (1/0/1)	2006 Turin	Cross country - Team sprint, Sprint	
Fredriksson; 1 / 3	(Sweden) Mathias Fredriksson (0/0/1); Brother	2006 Turin	Cross country - 4 × 10 km	
Hamelin; 5 / 7	(Canada) Charles Hamelin (4/1/1)	2006 Turin, 2010 Vancouver, 2014 Sochi, 2018 Pyeongchang, 2022 Beijing	Short Track Speed Skating - Men's 500m (2010), Men's 1500m (2014), Men's 5000m relay (2006, 2010, 2018, 2022)	
Hamelin; 5 / 7	(Canada) François Hamelin (1/0/0); Brother	2010 Vancouver, 2014 Sochi, 2018 Pyeongchang	Short Track Speed Skating - Men's 5000m relay (2010)	
Kaberle; 0 / 2	(Czech Republic) František Kaberle (0/0/1)	2006 Turin	Ice hockey (2006)	
Kaberle; 0 / 2	(Czech Republic) Tomáš Kaberle (0/0/1); Brother	2006 Turin	Ice hockey (2006)	
Norberg; 4 / 4	(Sweden) Anette Norberg (2/0/0)	2006 Turin, 2010 Vancouver	Curling - Women's team (2006, 2010)	
Norberg; 4 / 4	(Sweden) Cathrine Lindahl (2/0/0); Sister	2006 Turin, 2010 Vancouver	Curling - Women's team (2006, 2010)	
Ruutu; 0 / 4	(Finland) Jarkko Ruutu (0/1/1)	2006 Turin, 2010 Vancouver	Ice hockey (2006, 2010)	
Ruutu; 0 / 4	(Finland) Tuomo Ruutu (0/0/2); Brother	2010 Vancouver, 2014 Sochi	Ice hockey (2010, 2014)	
Sedin; 2 / 3	(Sweden) Daniel Sedin (1/1/0)	2006 Turin, 2014 Sochi	Ice hockey (2006, 2014)	
Sedin; 2 / 3	(Sweden) Henrik Sedin (1/0/0); Twin-brother	2006 Turin	Ice hockey (2006)	
Semerenko; 2 / 3	(Ukraine) Valj Semerenko (1/0/0)	2006 Turin, 2010 Vancouver, 2014 Sochi, 2018 Pyeongchang, 2022 Beijing	Biathlon - 4 × 6 km relay (2014)	
Semerenko; 2 / 3	(Ukraine) Vita Semerenko (1/0/1); Twin-sister	2010 Vancouver, 2014 Sochi, 2018 Pyeongchang	Biathlon - 4 × 6 km relay (2014), Sprint (2014)	
Watabe; 1 / 4	(Japan) Akito Watabe (0/2/2)	2006 Turin, 2010 Vancouver, 2014 Sochi, 2018 Pyeongchang, 2022 Beijing	Nordic Combined - Individual normal hill/10 km (2014, 2018), Individual large hill/10 km (2022), Team large hill/4x5 km (2022)	
Watabe; 1 / 4	(Japan) Yoshito Watabe (0/0/1); Brother	2014 Sochi, 2018 Pyeongchang, 2022 Beijing	Nordic Combined - Team large hill/4x5 km (2022)	
White; 1 / 4	(United States) Tanith Belbin White (0/1/0)	2006 Turin, 2010 Vancouver	Figure skating - Ice dance (2006)	Later divorced
White; 1 / 4	(United States) Charlie White (1/1/1); Husband	2010 Vancouver, 2014 Sochi	Figure skating - Ice Dance (2010, 2014), Team (2014)	
Bø; 8 / 16	(Norway) Tarjei Bø (3/2/2)	2010 Vancouver, 2014 Sochi, 2018 Pyeongchang, 2022 Beijing	Biathlon - Sprint (2022), Pursuit (2022), Relay (2010, 2014, 2018, 2022), Mixed Relay (2022)	
Bø; 8 / 16	(Norway) Johannes Thingnes Bø (5/2/2); Brother	2014 Sochi, 2018 Pyeongchang, 2022 Beijing	Biathlon - Individual (2018, 2022), Sprint (2022), Mass start (2022), Relay (2014, 2018, 2022), Mixed Relay (2018, 2022)	
Bergsma; 2 / 6	(Netherlands) Jorrit Bergsma (2/1/2)	2014 Sochi, 2018 Pyeongchang, 2026 Milano Cortina	Speed Skating - 5000m (2014), 10000m (2014, 2018, 2026), Mass Start (2026)	
Bergsma; 2 / 6	(United States) Heather Bergsma (0/0/1); Wife	2018 Pyeongchang	Speed Skating - Team pursuit (2018)	
Dufour-Lapointe; 1 / 3	(Canada) Justine Dufour-Lapointe (1/1/0)	2014 Sochi, 2018 Pyeongchang, 2022 Beijing	Freestyle skiing - Moguls (2014, 2018)	
Dufour-Lapointe; 1 / 3	(Canada) Chloé Dufour-Lapointe (0/1/0); Sister	2010 Vancouver, 2014 Sochi, 2018 Pyeongchang, 2022 Beijing	Freestyle skiing - Moguls (2014)	
Enright / Walker; 1 / 2	(Canada) Adam Enright (1/0/0)	2010 Vancouver	Curling - Men's team (2010)	
Enright / Walker; 1 / 2	(Canada) Geoff Walker (0/0/1); Brother-in-law	2022 Beijing	Curling - Men's team (2022)	
Gasparin / Chernousov; 0 / 2	(Switzerland) Selina Gasparin (0/1/0)	2010 Vancouver, 2014 Sochi, 2018 Pyeongchang, 2022 Beijing	Biathlon - Women's 15 km individual (2014)	
Gasparin / Chernousov; 0 / 2	(Russia) Ilia Chernousov (0/0/1); Husband	2014 Sochi	Cross-Country Skiing - Men's 50 km freestyle (2018)	
Kessel; 1 / 4	(United States) Phil Kessel (0/1/0)	2010 Vancouver, 2014 Sochi	Ice hockey (2010)	
Kessel; 1 / 4	(United States) Amanda Kessel (1/2/0); Sister	2014 Sochi, 2018 Pyeongchang, 2022 Beijing	Ice hockey (2014, 2018, 2022)	
Lamoureux; 2 / 6	(United States) Jocelyne Lamoureux (1/2/0)	2010 Vancouver, 2014 Sochi, 2018 Pyeongchang	Ice hockey (2010, 2014, 2018)	
Lamoureux; 2 / 6	(United States) Monique Lamoureux (1/2/0); Twin-sister	2010 Vancouver, 2014 Sochi, 2018 Pyeongchang	Ice hockey (2010, 2014, 2018)	
Matt; 1 / 3	(Austria) Andreas Matt (0/1/0)	2010 Vancouver	Ski cross (2010)	
Matt; 1 / 3	(Austria) Mario Matt (1/0/0); Brother	2014 Sochi	Alpine skiing - Slalom (2014)	
Matt; 1 / 3	(Austria) Michael Matt (0/0/1); Brother	2018 Pyeongchang	Alpine skiing - Slalom (2018)	
Poulin / Stacey; 4 / 8	(Canada) Marie-Philip Poulin (3/2/0)	2010 Vancouver, 2014 Sochi, 2018 Pyeongchang, 2022 Beijing, 2026 Milano Cortina	Ice Hockey - Women's (2010, 2014, 2018, 2022, 2026)	
Poulin / Stacey; 4 / 8	(Canada) Laura Stacey (1/2/0); Wife	2018 Pyeongchang, 2022 Beijing, 2026 Milano Cortina	Ice Hockey - Women's (2018, 2022, 2026)	
Prevc; 4 / 10	(Slovenia) Peter Prevc (1/2/1)	2010 Vancouver, 2014 Sochi, 2018 Pyeongchang, 2022 Beijing	Ski Jumping - Men's normal hill individual (2014), Large hill individual (2014), Large hill team (2022), Mixed team (2022)	
Prevc; 4 / 10	(Slovenia) Cene Prevc (0/1/0); Brother	2022 Beijing	Ski Jumping - Men's large hill team (2022)	
Prevc; 4 / 10	(Slovenia) Domen Prevc (2/0/0); Brother	2026 Milano Cortina	Ski Jumping - Men's large hill individual (2026), Mixed team (2026)	
Prevc; 4 / 10	(Slovenia) Nika Prevc (1/1/1); Sister	2026 Milano Cortina	Ski Jumping - Women's normal hill individual (2026), Large hill individual (2026), Mixed team (2026)	
Rydzek; 2 / 5	(Germany) Johannes Rydzek (2/1/1)	2010 Vancouver, 2014 Sochi, 2018 Pyeongchang	Nordic Combined - Men's individual large hill (2018), Team large hill (2010, 2014, 2018)	
Rydzek; 2 / 5	(Germany) Coletta Rydzek (0/0/1); Sister	2026 Milano Cortina	Cross-country skiing - Women's team sprint (2026)	
Xu / Wang; 3 / 7	(China) Xu Mengtao (2/2/1)	2010 Vancouver, 2014 Sochi, 2018 Pyeongchang, 2022 Beijing, 2026 Milano Cortina	Freestyle Skiing - Women's aerials (2014, 2022, 2026), Mixed team aerials (2022, 2026)	
Xu / Wang; 3 / 7	(China) Wang Xindi (1/0/1); Husband	2018 Pyeongchang, 2022 Beijing, 2026 Milano Cortina	Freestyle Skiing - Men's aerials (2026), Mixed team aerials (2026)	
Bates / Chock; 4 / 6	(United States) Evan Bates (2/1/0)	2014 Sochi, 2018 Pyeongchang, 2022 Beijing, 2026 Milano Cortina	Figure skating - Team (2022, 2026), Ice Dance (2026)	
Bates / Chock; 4 / 6	(United States) Madison Chock (2/1/0); Wife	2014 Sochi, 2018 Pyeongchang, 2022 Beijing, 2026 Milano Cortina	Figure skating - Team (2022, 2026), Ice Dance (2026)	
Benz; 0 / 2	(Switzerland) Laura Benz (0/0/1)	2014 Sochi	Ice hockey (2014)	
Benz; 0 / 2	(Switzerland) Sara Benz (0/0/1); Twin-sister	2014 Sochi	Ice hockey (2014)	
Drummond / Wright; 1 / 2	(United Kingdom) Greg Drummond (0/1/0)	2014 Sochi	Curling - Men's Team (2014)	
Drummond / Wright; 1 / 2	(United Kingdom) Vicky Wright (1/0/0); Wife	2022 Beijing	Curling - Women's Team (2022)	
Ericsson; 0 / 2	(Sweden) Jimmie Ericsson (0/1/0)	2014 Sochi	Ice hockey (2014)	
Ericsson; 0 / 2	(Sweden) Jonathan Ericsson (0/1/0); Brother	2014 Sochi	Ice hockey (2014)	
Gisin; 3 / 4	(Switzerland) Dominique Gisin (1/0/0)	2014 Sochi	Alpine skiing - Downhill (2014)	
Gisin; 3 / 4	(Switzerland) Michelle Gisin (2/0/1); Sister	2018 Pyeongchang, 2022 Beijing	Alpine skiing - Alpine Combined (2018, 2022), Super-G (2022)	
Granlund; 1 / 2	(Finland) Mikael Granlund (0/0/1)	2014 Sochi	Ice hockey (2014)	
Granlund; 1 / 2	(Finland) Markus Granlund (1/0/0); Brother	2022 Beijing	Ice hockey (2022)	
Harnden / Jacobs; 4 / 4	(Canada) E. J. Harnden (1/0/0)	2014 Sochi	Curling - Men's team (2014)	
Harnden / Jacobs; 4 / 4	(Canada) Ryan Harnden (1/0/0); Brother	2014 Sochi	Curling - Men's team (2014)	
Harnden / Jacobs; 4 / 4	(Canada) Brad Jacobs (2/0/0); Cousin	2014 Sochi, 2026 Milano Cortina	Curling - Men's team (2014, 2026)	
Katsalapov / Sinitsina; 1 / 6	(Russia) / ROC Nikita Katsalapov (1/1/2)	2014 Sochi, 2022 Beijing	Figure skating - Ice dance (2014, 2022), Team (2014, 2022)	
Katsalapov / Sinitsina; 1 / 6	ROC Victoria Sinitsina (0/1/1); Wife	2022 Beijing	Figure skating - Ice dance (2022), Team (2022)	
Klimov / Tarasova; 1 / 4	(Russia) Fedor Klimov (1/1/0)	2014 Sochi	Figure skating - Pairs (2014), Team (2014)	
Klimov / Tarasova; 1 / 4	Olympic Athletes from Russia / ROC Evgenia Tarasova (0/2/0); Wife	2018 Pyeongchang, 2022 Beijing	Figure skating - Team (2018), Pairs (2022)	
Lacasse / Maschmeyer; 2 / 4	(Canada) Geneviève Lacasse (1/1/0)	2014 Sochi, 2018 Pyeongchang	Ice hockey (2014, 2018)	
Lacasse / Maschmeyer; 2 / 4	(Canada) Emerance Maschmeyer (1/1/0); Wife	2022 Beijing, 2026 Milano Cortina	Ice hockey (2022, 2026)	
Marty; 0 / 2	(Switzerland) Julia Marty (0/0/1)	2014 Sochi	Ice hockey (2014)	
Marty; 0 / 2	(Switzerland) Stefanie Marty (0/0/1); Twin-sister	2014 Sochi	Ice hockey (2014)	
Mulder; 1 / 3	(Netherlands) Michel Mulder (1/0/1)	2014 Sochi	Speed skating - 500m 1000m (2014)	
Mulder; 1 / 3	(Netherlands) Ronald Mulder (0/0/1); Twin brother	2014 Sochi, 2018 Pyeongchang	Speed skating - 500m (2014)	
Niskanen; 3 / 9	(Finland) Iivo Niskanen (3/1/1)	2014 Sochi, 2018 Pyeongchang, 2022 Beijing	Cross country - Team sprint (2014, 2022), 50 km classic (2018), 15 km classic (2022), 15 km + 15 km Skiathlon (2022)	
Niskanen; 3 / 9	(Finland) Kerttu Niskanen (0/3/1); Sister	2014 Sochi, 2022 Beijing	Cross country - 4 × 5 km (2014), - Team sprint (2014), 10 km classic (2022), 30 km freestyle (2022)	
Trankov / Volosozhar; 4 / 4	(Russia) Maxim Trankov (2/0/0)	2014 Sochi	Figure Skating - Pair skating (2014), Team (2014)	
Trankov / Volosozhar; 4 / 4	(Russia) Tatiana Volosozhar (2/0/0); Wife	2014 Sochi	Figure Skating - Pair skating (2014), Team (2014)	
Valcepina; 0 / 4	(Italy) Martina Valcepina (0/2/1)	2014 Sochi, 2018 Pyeongchang, 2022 Beijing	Short track speed skating - 3000 m relay (2014, 2018), Mixed 2000 m relay (2022)	
Valcepina; 0 / 4	(Italy) Arianna Valcepina (0/1/0); Sister	2022 Beijing	Short track speed skating - Mixed 2000 m relay (2022)	
Yoshida; 0 / 4	(Japan) Chinami Yoshida (0/1/1)	2014 Sochi, 2018 Pyeongchang, 2022 Beijing	Curling - Women's team (2018, 2022)	
Yoshida; 0 / 4	(Japan) Yurika Yoshida (0/1/1); Sister	2018 Pyeongchang, 2022 Beijing	Curling - Women's team (2018, 2022)	
Atkin; 0 / 2	(United Kingdom) Isabel Atkin (0/0/1)	2018 Pyeongchang	Freestyle skiing - Women's slopestyle (2018)	
Atkin; 0 / 2	(United Kingdom) Zoe Atkin (0/0/1); Sister	2026 Milano Cortina	Freestyle skiing - Women's halfpipe (2026)	
Egle; 0 / 4	(Austria) Madeleine Egle (0/1/1)	2018 Pyeongchang, 2022 Beijing	Luge - Mixed team (2018, 2022)	
Egle; 0 / 4	(Austria) Selina Egle (0/1/1); Sister	2026 Milano Cortina	Luge - Women's Doubles (2026), Mixed team (2026)	
Kim; 0 / 2	(South Korea) Kim Yeong-mi (0/1/0)	2018 Pyeongchang, 2022 Beijing	Curling - Women's team (2018)	
Kim; 0 / 2	(South Korea) Kim Kyeong-ae (0/1/0); Sister	2018 Pyeongchang, 2022 Beijing	Curling - Women's team (2018)	
Knierim; 1 / 3	(United States) Chris Knierim (0/0/1)	2018 Pyeongchang	Figure skating - Team, Pair skating (2018)	
Knierim; 1 / 3	(United States) Alexa Knierim (1/0/1); Wife	2018 Pyeongchang, 2022 Beijing	Figure skating - Team, Pair skating (2018, 2022)	
Liu; 3 / 6	(Hungary) Shaolin Sándor Liu (1/0/1)	2018 Pyeongchang, 2022 Beijing	Short track - 5000 m relay (2018), 2000 m mixed relay (2022)	
Liu; 3 / 6	(Hungary) Shaoang Liu (2/0/2); Brother	2018 Pyeongchang, 2022 Beijing	Short track - 5000 m relay (2018), 500 m (2022), 1000 m (2022), 2000 m mixed relay (2022)	
Pätz; 0 / 2	(Switzerland) Claudio Pätz (0/0/1)	2018 Pyeongchang	Curling - Men's team (2018)	
Pätz; 0 / 2	(Switzerland) Alina Pätz (0/1/0); Sister	2026 Milano Cortina	Curling - Women's team (2026)	
Öberg; 3 / 8	(Sweden) Hanna Öberg (2/2/0)	2018 Pyeongchang, 2022 Beijing, 2026 Milano Cortina	Biathlon - Women's individual (2018), Relay (2018, 2022, 2026)	
Öberg; 3 / 8	(Sweden) Elvira Öberg (1/3/0); Sister	2022 Beijing, 2026 Milano Cortina	Biathlon - Women's sprint (2022), Pursuit (2022), Relay (2022, 2026)	
Shibutani; 0 / 4	(United States) Alex Shibutani (0/0/2)	2018 Pyeongchang	Figure skating - Team (2018), Ice dance (2018)	
Shibutani; 0 / 4	(United States) Maia Shibutani (0/0/2); Sister	2018 Pyeongchang	Figure skating - Team (2018), Ice dance (2018)	
Skaslien / Nedregotten; 0 / 4	(Norway) Kristin Skaslien (0/1/1)	2018 Pyeongchang, 2022 Beijing	Curling - Mixed team (2018, 2022)	
Skaslien / Nedregotten; 0 / 4	(Norway) Magnus Nedregotten (0/1/1); Husband	2018 Pyeongchang, 2022 Beijing	Curling - Mixed team (2018, 2022)	
Takagi; 4 / 13	(Japan) Nana Takagi (2/1/0)	2018 Pyeongchang, 2022 Beijing	Speed skating - Mass start (2018), Team Pursuit (2018, 2022)	
Takagi; 4 / 13	(Japan) Miho Takagi (2/4/4); Sister	2018 Pyeongchang, 2022 Beijing, 2026 Milano Cortina	Speed skating - 1000m (2018, 2022, 2026), 1500m (2018, 2022), Team Pursuit (2018, 2022, 2026), 500m (2022, 2026)	
Turnbull / Sommer; 1 / 4	(Canada) Blayre Turnbull (1/2/0)	2018 Pyeongchang, 2022 Beijing, 2026 Milano Cortina	Ice Hockey - (2018, 2022, 2026)	
Turnbull / Sommer; 1 / 4	(Canada) Ryan Sommer (0/0/1); Husband	2022 Beijing	Bobsled - Four-man (2022)	
Wranå; 3 / 4	(Sweden) Rasmus Wranå (2/1/0)	2018 Pyeongchang, 2022 Beijing, 2026 Milano Cortina	Curling - Team (2018, 2022), Mixed Doubles (2026)	
Wranå; 3 / 4	(Sweden) Isabella Wranå (1/0/0); Sister	2026 Milano Cortina	Curling - Mixed Doubles (2026)	
Bots / Bota; 0 / 2	(Latvia) Mārtiņš Bots (0/0/1)	2022 Beijing	Luge - Team relay (2022)	
Bots / Bota; 0 / 2	(Latvia) Elīna Ieva Bota (0/1/0); Wife	2026 Milano Cortina	Luge - Women's Singles (2026)	
Desmet; 0 / 3	(Belgium) Hanne Desmet (0/0/2)	2022 Beijing, 2026 Milano Cortina	Short track speed skating - 1000m (2022), Mixed 2000m relay (2026)	
Desmet; 0 / 3	(Belgium) Stijn Desmet (0/0/1); Brother	2026 Milano Cortina	Short track speed skating - Mixed 2000m relay (2026)	
Komatsubara; 0 / 2	(Japan) Tim Koleto (0/1/0)	2022 Beijing	Figure skating - Team (2022)	Later divorced
Komatsubara; 0 / 2	(Japan) Misato Komatsubara (0/1/0); Wife	2022 Beijing	Figure skating - Team (2022)	
McMillan / Hardie / Lammie; 0 / 6	(United Kingdom) Hammy McMillan Jr. (0/2/0)	2022 Beijing, 2026 Milano Cortina	Curling - Men's team (2022, 2026)	
McMillan / Hardie / Lammie; 0 / 6	(United Kingdom) Grant Hardie (0/2/0); Cousin	2022 Beijing, 2026 Milano Cortina	Curling - Men's team (2022, 2026)	
McMillan / Hardie / Lammie; 0 / 6	(United Kingdom) Bobby Lammie (0/2/0); Cousin	2022 Beijing, 2026 Milano Cortina	Curling - Men's team (2022, 2026)	
Sildaru; 0 / 2	(Estonia) Kelly Sildaru (0/0/1)	2022 Beijing, 2026 Milano Cortina	Freestyle skiing - Women's slopestyle (2022)	
Sildaru; 0 / 2	(Estonia) Henry Sildaru (0/1/0); Brother	2026 Milano Cortina	Freestyle skiing - Men's halfpipe (2026)	
Hughes; 2 / 2	(United States) Quinn Hughes (1/0/0)	2026 Milano Cortina	Ice Hockey - Men's team (2026)	
Hughes; 2 / 2	(United States) Jack Hughes (1/0/0); Brother	2026 Milano Cortina	Ice Hockey - Men's team (2026)	
Van 't Wout; 4 / 6	(Netherlands) Melle van 't Wout (1/1/0)	2026 Milano Cortina	Short track speed skating - 500m (2026), men's relay (2026)	
Van 't Wout; 4 / 6	(Netherlands) Jens van 't Wout (3/0/1); Brother	2026 Milano Cortina	Short track speed skating - 500m (2026), 1000m (2026), 1500m (2026), men's relay (2026)	

== Summer and Winter Olympics ==
Family Gold Medal/ Total	Member (Gold/Silver/Bronze) Relationship	Olympics	Sports	Note
Abrahamsson; 0 / 2	(Sweden) Erik Abrahamsson (0/0/1)	1920 Antwerp	Athletics - Long jump (1920)	
Abrahamsson; 0 / 2	(Sweden) Carl Abrahamsson (0/1/0); Brother	1928 St. Moritz	Ice hockey (1928)	
Jakobsson; 2 / 4	(Finland) Walter Jakobsson (1/1/0)	1920 Antwerp, 1924 Chamonix	Figure skating - Pairs (1920, 1924)	
Jakobsson; 2 / 4	(Finland) Ludowika Jakobsson (0/1/0); Wife	1920 Antwerp, 1924 Chamonix	Figure skating - Pairs (1920, 1924)	
Phinney; 1 / 2	(United States) Connie Carpenter-Phinney (1/0/0)	1972 Sapporo, 1984 Los Angeles	Cycling - Women's road race (1984)	Competed in speed skating, but did not medal.
Phinney; 1 / 2	(United States) Davis Phinney (0/0/1); Husband	1984 Los Angeles	Cycling - Men's team time trial (1984)	
Young; 1 / 4	(United States) Sheila Young (1/1/1)	1972 Sapporo, 1976 Innsbruck	Speed skating - Women's 500m (1976), 1000m (1976), 1500m (1976)	
Young; 1 / 4	(United States) Connie Paraskevin-Young (0/0/1); Sister-in-law	1984 Sarajevo, 1988 Seoul, 1992 Barcelona, 1996 Atlanta	Cycling - Women's sprint (1988)	Competed in speed skating, but did not medal.
Pecka / Jeriová; 0 / 5	(Czechoslovakia) Zdeněk Pecka (0/0/2)	1976 Montreal, 1980 Moscow	Rowing - Men's quadruple sculls (1976), Double sculls (1980)	
Pecka / Jeriová; 0 / 5	(Czechoslovakia) Květa Jeriová (0/1/2); Wife	1980 Lake Placid, 1984 Sarajevo	Cross country skiing - Women's 5 km (1980, 1984), 4 x 5 km relay (1984)	
Eldebrink; 0 / 2	(Sweden) Kenth Eldebrink (0/0/1)	1984 Los Angeles	Athletics - Men's javelin (1984)	
Eldebrink; 0 / 2	(Sweden) Anders Eldebrink (0/0/1); Brother	1988 Calgary	Ice hockey (1988)	
Afinogenov / Dementieva; 1 / 3	(Russia) Maxim Afinogenov (0/0/1)	2002 Salt Lake City, 2006 Turin, 2010 Vancouver	Ice Hockey (2002)	
Afinogenov / Dementieva; 1 / 3	(Russia) Elena Dementieva (1/1/0); Wife	2000 Sydney, 2004 Athens, 2008 Beijing	Tennis - Women's singles (2000, 2008)	

== See also ==
- List of sport awards
- List of multiple Olympic gold medalists
- List of multiple Olympic gold medalists at a single Games
- List of multiple Olympic gold medalists in one event
- List of multiple Olympic medalists
- List of multiple Olympic medalists at a single Games
- List of multiple Olympic medalists in one event
- List of Olympians who won medals in the Summer and Winter Games
- List of athletes with the most appearances at Olympic Games
- Lists of Paralympic medalists
- List of Olympic medalists in art competitions
