= Field hockey at the 1960 Summer Olympics – Men's team squads =

List of hockey players

The following is the list of squads that took place in the men's field hockey tournament at the 1960 Summer Olympics.

== Group A ==
=== Denmark ===
The following players represented Denmark:

- Erling Nielsen
- Bent Kilde
- Carsten Bruun
- Erik Frandsen
- Hans Glendrup
- Villy Moll Nielsen
- Jesper Guldbrandsen
- Poul Moll Nielsen
- Flemming Kristiansen
- Torben Alstrup Jensen
- Vagn Peitersen
- Willy Kristoffersen

=== India ===
The following players represented India:

- Shankar Lakshman
- Prithipal Singh
- Jaman Lal Sharma
- Leslie Claudius
- Charanjit Singh
- Govind Sawant
- Joginder Singh (field hockey)
- John Peter
- Jaswant Singh
- Udham Singh
- Raghbir Singh Bhola
- Joseph Antic
- Mohinder Lal

=== Netherlands ===
The following players represented the Netherlands:

- Carel Dekker
- Eddie Zwier
- Egbert de Graeff
- Frans Fiolet
- Freddie Hooghiemstra
- Gerard Overdijkink
- Gerrit de Ruiter
- Hans Wagener
- Jaap Leemhuis
- Jan Willem van Erven Dorens
- Jan van Gooswilligen
- Patrick Buteux van der Kamp
- Theo van Vroonhoven
- Theo Terlingen
- Thom van Dijck
- Wim de Beer

=== New Zealand ===
The following players represented New Zealand:

- Anthony Hayde
- Bruce Turner
- Guy McGregor
- Ian Kerr
- Jim Barclay
- John Abrams
- John Cullen
- Ross Gillespie
- Kevin Percy
- Mervyn McKinnon
- Murray Mathieson
- Noel Hobson
- Phil Bygrave
- Bill Schaefer

== Group B ==
=== Australia ===
The following players represented Australia:

- Barry Malcolm
- Desmond Spackman
- Donald Currie
- Eric Pearce
- Errol Bill
- Gordon Pearce
- Graham Wood
- John McBryde
- Julian Pearce
- Kevin Carton
- Louis Hailey
- Mervyn Crossman
- Mike Craig
- Philip Pritchard
- Ray Evans

=== Japan ===
The following players represented Japan:

- Hiroyuki Fujiwara
- Hisatoshi Yamazaki
- Ichiro Sado
- Kenji Iijima
- Michinori Watada
- Tadatoshi Abe
- Teruo Yaguchi
- Toshiharu Nakamura
- Tsuneya Yuzaki
- Hiroshi Kojima
- Yoshio Kojima
- Masaru Kanbe
- Kunio Iwahashi
- Seiji Kihara

=== Pakistan ===
The following players represented Pakistan:

- Manzoor Hussain Atif
- Chaudhry Ghulam Rasool
- Anwar Ahmed Khan
- Noor Alam
- Abdul Hamid
- Habib Ali Kiddie
- Naseer Bunda
- Motiullah Khan
- Lala Abdul Rashid
- Bashir Ahmed
- Abdul Waheed Ahmed
- Mushtaq Ahmed
- Khursheed Aslam

=== Poland ===
The following players represented Poland:

- Alfons Flinik
- Czesław Kubiak
- Henryk Flinik
- Jan Flinik
- Jan Górny
- Kazimierz Dąbrowski
- Leon Wiśniewski
- Narcyz Maciaszczyk
- Roman Micał
- Ryszard Marzec
- Władysław Śmigielski
- Włodzimierz Różański
- Zdzisław Wojdylak

== Group C ==
=== France ===
The following players represented France:

- Albert Vanpoulle
- Claude Dugardin
- Claude Leroy
- Claude Windal
- Diran Manoukian
- Gérard Poulain
- Ido Marang
- Jacques Bonnet
- Jacques Mauchien
- Jean Desmasures
- Jean-Pierre Windal
- Maurice Dobigny
- Philippe Reynaud
- Pierre Court
- Roger Bignon
- Yvan Bia

=== Italy ===
The following players represented Italy:

- Alessandro Vannini
- Antonio Lenza
- Antonio Vargiu
- Bruno Figliola
- Claudio Candotti
- Claudio Libotte
- Enrico Bisio
- Felice Salis
- Giampaolo Farci
- Giampaolo Medda
- Giovanni Anni
- Giovanni Mazzalupi
- Luciano Soli
- Luigi Farci
- Quarto Pianesi
- Sergio Ballesio
- Tullio Marchiori
- Ugo Zorco

=== Kenya ===
The following players represented Kenya:

- Saude George
- Anthony Vaz
- Avtar Singh Sohal
- Jagnandan Singh
- Surjeet Singh Deol
- Silvester Fernandes
- Edgar Fernandes
- Hilary Fernandes
- Surjeet Singh Panesar
- Pritam Singh Sandhu
- Alu Mendonca
- John Simonian
- Kirpal Singh Bhardwaj
- Gursaran Singh Sehmi
- Egbert Fernandes
- Krishnan Kumar Aggarwal

=== United Team of Germany ===
The following players represented the United Team of Germany:

- Carsten Keller
- Christian Büchting
- Dieter Krause
- Eberhard Ferstl
- Günther Ullerich
- Helmut Nonn
- Herbert Winters
- Hugo Budinger
- Klaus Greinert
- Klaus Woeller
- Norbert Schuler
- Werner Delmes
- Willi Brendel
- Wolfgang End
- Klaus Lauth

== Group D ==
=== Belgium ===
The following players represented Belgium:

- André Carbonnelle
- André Muschs
- Eddy Carbonnelle
- Franz Lorette
- Freddy Rens
- Guy Debbaudt
- Guy Huyghens
- Jacques Rémy
- Jacques Vanderstappen
- Jean Dubois
- Jean-Pierre Marionex
- Jean-Louis Roersch
- Michel Muschs
- Pierre Delbecque
- Robert Lycke
- Roger Goossens
- Yves Bernaert

=== Great Britain ===
The following players represented Great Britain:

- Patrick Austen (Old Kingstonians)
- John Bell (Army)
- Harry Cahill (gk) (Belfast YMCA)
- Denys Carnill (capt) (Cheltenham)
- Colin Dale (Old Kingstonians)
- Peter Croft (Surbiton)
- Howard Davis (North Stafford)
- Paul Fishwick (gk) (Harborne)
- John Hindle (Preston)
- Kim Jones (Southgate)
- Neil Livingstone (Oxford University)
- Stuart Mayes (Cambridge University)
- Derek Miller (Old Kingstonians)
- John Neill (Army)
- Chris Saunders-Griffiths (Deeside Ramblers)
- Frederick Scott (R.A.F)
- Ian Taylor (Oxford University)
- David F. Tomlinson (Cambridge University)

=== Spain ===
The following players represented Spain:

- Pedro Amat
- Francisco Caballer
- Juan Ángel Calzado
- José Colomer
- Carlos del Coso
- José Antonio Dinarés
- Eduardo Dualde
- Joaquín Dualde
- Rafael Egusquiza
- Ignacio Macaya
- Pedro Murúa
- Pedro Roig
- Luis María Usoz
- Narciso Ventalló

=== Switzerland ===
The following players represented Switzerland:

- Albert Piaget
- Georges Mathys
- Gilbert Recordon
- Hans Straub
- Heinz Wirz
- Jean Giubbini
- Jean Glarner
- Kurt Locher
- Kurt von Arx
- René Wiedmer
- Roger Zanetti
- Roland Zaninetti
- Walther Arber
- Walther Wirz
- Werner Hausmann
- Werner Schmid
