= Kenya at the 1960 Summer Olympics =

- IOC code: KEN
- NOC: National Olympic Committee of Kenya
- Website: teamkenya.or.ke

in Rome
- Competitors: 27 in 4 sports
- Medals: Gold 0 Silver 0 Bronze 0 Total 0

Summer Olympics appearances (overview)
- 1956; 1960; 1964; 1968; 1972; 1976–1980; 1984; 1988; 1992; 1996; 2000; 2004; 2008; 2012; 2016; 2020; 2024

The Colony and Protectorate of Kenya competed at the 1960 Summer Olympics in Rome, Italy. 27 competitors, all men, took part in 13 events in 4 sports.

== Athletics ==
Key

- Note–Ranks given for track events are within the athlete's heat only
- Q = Qualified for the next round
- q = Qualified for the next round as a fastest loser or, in field events, by position without achieving the qualifying target
- N/A = Round not applicable for the event
- Bye = Athlete not required to compete in round

Men

Track & road events

Athlete	Event	Heat		Quarterfinal		Semifinal		Final	
Athlete	Event	Result	Rank	Result	Rank	Result	Rank	Result	Rank
Seraphino Antao	100 m	10.64	1 Q	10.61	3 Q	10.72	6	did not advance	
Seraphino Antao	200 m	21.44	1 Q	21.43	4	did not advance			
Seraphino Antao	110 m hurdles	15.13	5	did not advance					
Bartonjo Rotich	400 m	47.89	3 Q	47.97	7	did not advance			
Bartonjo Rotich	400 m hurdles	51.39	2 Q	—		51.97	5	did not advance	
Nyandika Maiyoro	5000 m	14:06.29	3 Q	—				13:53.25	6
Arere Anentia	10,000 m	—						30:01.00	19
Kanuti Sum	Marathon	—						2:46:55.2	59

== Hockey ==
=== Roster ===
- Saude George
- Anthony Vaz
- Avtar Singh Sohal
- Nil Jagnandan Singh
- Surjeet Singh Deol
- Silvester Fernandes
- Edgar Fernandes
- Hilary Fernandes
- Surjeet Singh Panesar
- Pritam Singh Sandhu
- Alu Mendonca
- John Simonian
- Kirpal Singh Bhardwaj
- Gursaran Singh Sehmi
- Egbert Fernandes
- Krishnan Kumar Aggarwal

=== Preliminary round ===
==== Group C ====
August 29
10:00

Kenya	1–0 (0–0)	Germany
H. Fernandes 45'

Stadio dei Marmi
Umpires:
Burgess (GBR), H. Singh (IND)

September 1
15:00

Kenya	7–0 (3–0)	Italy
E. Fernandes 14'; H. Fernandes 17', 64', 65'; Sohal 24', 48'; Pianesi 42' (OG)

Olympic Velodrome
Umpires:
Bernet (SUI), Harasta (AUT)

September 3
16:30

Kenya	0–0 (0–0)	France

Olympic Velodrome
Umpires:
H. Singh (IND), Burgess (GBR)

Group standings

Team	Pld	W	D	L	GF	GA	Pts
Kenya	3	2	1	0	8	0	5
Germany	3	2	0	1	10	1	4
France	3	1	1	1	2	5	3
Italy	3	0	0	3	0	14	0

=== Play-offs ===
==== Quarter-final ====
September 5
15:00

Great Britain	2–1 (0–1)	Kenya
Saunders 36', 115'		Sohal 22'

Olympic Velodrome
Umpires:
G. Singh (IND), Ghosh (IND)

Winning goal scored in sixth period of extra time.

=== Classification matches ===
==== Fifth to eighth place ====
September 8
16:30

Australia	1–1 (0–0)	Kenya
Crossman 40'		Deol 63'

Olympic Velodrome
Umpires:
Elgershuizen (NED), Glichitch (FRA)

The match was suspended due to darkness after 40 minutes of extra time, ending in a 1–1 draw; Australia was initially awarded the match by a coin toss, but after an appeal by Kenya, the match was declared a draw and a replay ordered. Australia won that match played on 10 September, 2–1.

September 10
16:30

Australia	2–1 (0–0)	Kenya
Evans 64', 69'		Panaser 42'

Campo Tre Fontane
Umpires:
Elgershuizen (NED), Van Ballgoijen de Jong (NED)

—

Kenya	—	Germany

Due to unforeseen circumstances, Germany was unable to play in the match against Kenya, so the match was scratched and both teams were awarded seventh place.

== Sailing ==
Three Kenyan sailors competed in two different disciplines in the Olympic Regatta in Naples.

Athlete	Event	Race							Net points	Final rank
Athlete	Event	1	2	3	4	5	6	7	Net points	Final rank
Daniel MacKenzie	Finn	25	21	26	28	~~34~~	16	25	1,686	29
Anthony Bentley-Buckle; Ronald Blaker	Flying Dutchman	8	14	~~DNF~~	13	15	18	19	2,680	20

== Shooting ==
Three shooters represented Kenya in 1960.

Athlete	Event	Qualification		Final	
Athlete	Event	Points	Rank	Points	Rank
Edward Penn	50m pistol	340	41 Q	521	40
Charles Trotter	50m rifle, prone	381	48 Q	574	37
Petrus Visagie	50m rifle, prone	383	37 Q	571	43
