= Deaths in October 1990 =

The following is a list of notable deaths in October 1990.

Entries for each day are listed alphabetically by surname. A typical entry lists information in the following sequence:

- Name, age, country of citizenship at birth, subsequent country of citizenship (if applicable), reason for notability, cause of death (if known), and reference.

== October 1990 ==
=== 1 ===
- John Stewart Bell, 62, Northern Irish physicist, cerebral haemorrhage.
- June Emerson, 66, Canadian baseball player.
- Edmund Irving, 80, British hydrographer.
- Jean Flammang, 85, Luxembourgian Olympic boxer (1924).
- Andrzej Krzanowski, 39, Polish composer.
- Augustin Laurent, 94, French politician.
- Curtis LeMay, 83, American general, heart attack.
- Russell Thacher, 71, American film producer (Soylent Green), complications from surgery.
- Tommy Thompson, 63, American football player (Cleveland Browns), cancer.

=== 2 ===
- Peter Herman Adler, 90, Austrian-born American conductor.
- Xosé María Díaz Castro, 76, Galician poet and translator.
- John Groff, 100, American general, heart attack.
- Jaime Mendes, 77, Portuguese Olympic long distance-runner (1936).
- Loni Nest, 75, German actress.
- Karl Neumeister, 87, Austrian Olympic equestrian (1936).
- Isolina Rondón, 77, Puerto Rican nationalist.
- Fred Rwigyema, 33, Rwandan soldier, shot.
- Heinie Schuble, 83, American baseball player (St. Louis Cardinals, Detroit Lions).
- Mercedes Simone, 86, Argentinian singer and actress.
- Norbert Vesak, 53, Canadian choreographer, brain aneurysm.

=== 3 ===
- Winslow Ames, 83, American art historian, heart attack.
- Amy Bailey, 94, Jamaican civil rights activist.
- Charlotte Boyle, 91, American Olympic swimmer (1920).
- Stefano Casiraghi, 30, Italian powerboat racer, boating accident.
- Res Jost, 72, Swiss theoretical physicist.
- Ellis Pringle, 79, Canadian ice hockey player (New York Americans).
- Eleanor Steber, 76, American opera singer, complications from heart surgery.
- Bill White, 73, Australian rules footballer.

=== 4 ===
- Alyn Ainsworth, 66, British musician.
- Jill Bennett, 63, English actress, drug overdose.
- Avis Bunnage, 67, English actress.
- Erwin Bünning, 84, German biologist, Alzheimer's disease.
- Luciano Catenacci, 57, Italian actor.
- Roy Charman, 60, English sound engineer.
- Jacques de Mahieu, 74, French-Argentine anthropologist and peronist.
- Vance Dinges, 75, American baseball player (Philadelphia Phillies).
- George Gordon, 88, Australian rules footballer.
- Sergey Lapin, 78, Soviet diplomat.
- František Nekolný, 82, Czechoslovak Olympic boxer (1928).
- Waldemar Philippi, 61, German footballer.
- Ray Stephens, 35, American singer (Village People) and actor (The Great Space Coaster), AIDS.
- Peter Taylor, 62, English football player, lung disease.

=== 5 ===
- Félix Dafauce, 93, Spanish actor.
- Marvin Gelber, 77, Canadian politician, member of the House of Commons of Canada (1963-1965).
- André Grabar, 94, Ukrainian-American art historian.
- Dixie Howell, 70, American baseball player (Pittsburgh Pirates, Cincinnati Reds, Brooklyn Dodgers).
- Yoshio Kondo, 80, American Biologist and malacologist.
- J. Murray Mitchell, 62, American climatologist.
- Ernesto Parga, 54, Argentine Olympic water polo player (1960).
- Roberto Soundy, 90, Salvadorian Olympic sports shooter (1968).
- Sam Taylor, 74, American saxophonist.
- Đorđe Vujadinović, 80, Yugoslav football player.
- Jan Hendrik Waszink, 81, Dutch Latin scholar.

=== 6 ===
- Märta Dorff, 81, Swedish film actress.
- Asser Fagerström, 78, Finnish pianist, composer and actor.
- James E. Newcom, 85, American film editor.
- Danny Rodriguez, 22, American Christian rapper, shot.
- Richard P. Ross Jr., 84, American general.
- Dick Starzyk, 69, American basketball player.
- Henryk Vogelfanger, 86, Polish actor.
- Bahriye Üçok, 70-71, Turkish politician and journalist, assassinated.

=== 7 ===
- Chiara Badano, 18, Italian Catholic activist, osteosarcoma, bone cancer.
- Bellarmino Bagatti, 84, Italian archaeologist.
- Darrel Brown, 67, American basketball player.
- Beatrice Hutton, 97, Australian architect.
- Rashid bin Saeed Al Maktoum, 78, Emirati politician, prime minister (since 1979).
- Scott M. Matheson, 61, American politician, governor of Utah (1977–1985), multiple myeloma.
- Grim Natwick, 100, American animator (Fleischer Studios), pneumonia.
- Manuel Ramos Otero, 42, Puerto Rican writer, AIDS.
- Walt Ripley, 73, American baseball player (Boston Red Sox).

=== 8 ===
- Juan José Arévalo, 86, Guatemalan politician, president (1945–1951).
- Frank Cope, 74, American football player.
- William Henry Harrison III, 94, American politician, member of the U.S. House of Representatives (1951–1955, 1961–1965, 1967–1969), heart failure.
- William James Jameson, 92, American judge.
- Jeppe Johannes Ladegaard-Mikkelsen, 75, Danish Olympic equestrian (1948).
- Jimmy Mills, 96, Scottish-American footballer.
- Robert F. Murphy, 66, American anthropologist, heart failure.
- Kamalapati Tripathi, 85, Indian politician.
- Eric Wennström, 81, Swedish Olympic hurdler (1928).
- B.J. Wilson, 43, English drummer, pneumonia.

=== 9 ===
- Mildred Bayer, 81, American humanitarian.
- Murray Bowen, 77, American psychologist.
- John Brooks, 80, American Olympic long jumper (1936).
- Georges de Rham, 87, Swiss mathematician.
- Dessie Grew, 37, Irish Provisional IRA volunteer, shot.
- Markku Hakulinen, 34, Finnish Olympic ice hockey player (1980), suicide by train collision.
- Martin McCaughey, 23, Irish Provisional IRA volunteer, shot.
- Richard Murdoch, 83, English actor.
- Arnold Olsen, 73, American politician, member of the U.S. House of Representatives (1961–1971).
- Géza Ottlik, 78, Hungarian writer and mathematician.
- Boris Paichadze, 75, Soviet footballer.
- Lars Thörn, 86, Swedish Olympic sailor (1956, 1964).

=== 10 ===
- George Barnicle, 73, American MLB player (Boston Bees/Braves).
- Kenneth Cross, 74, British physiologist.
- Emil Josef Diemer, 82, German chess player.
- Walter Hammersen, 79, German politician.
- Eric Huxtable, 81, Australian rules footballer.
- Dick Jorgensen, 56, American football official, cancer.
- Ziggy Marcell, 74, American baseball and basketball player (Harlem Globetrotters).
- Irene Mayer Selznick, 83, American theatrical producer, breast cancer.
- Jerónimo Mihura, 88, Spanish film director.
- Wally Moses, 80, American baseball player (Philadelphia Athletics, Boston Red Sox, Chicago White Sox).
- Tom Murton, 62, American prison warden, cancer.
- Floyd R. Newman, 100, American oil businessman.
- Barbara Boggs Sigmund, 51, American politician, cancer.
- Edward Szostak, 79, Polish Olympic basketball player (1936).
- Carlos Thompson, 67, Argentine actor, suicide by gunshot.
- Josef Trousílek, 72, Czechoslovak Olmypic ice hockey player (1948).

=== 11 ===
- Ichio Asukata, 75, Japanese politician.
- Anatole Broyard, 70, American writer and journalist, prostate cancer.
- George Corbett, 82, American football player (Chicago Bears).
- Günter Kuhnke, 78, German submarine commander.
- Ken Spain, 44, American basketball player (Pittsburgh Condors) and Olympian (1968), cancer.
- Robert Tessier, 56, American actor, cancer.
- Adri van Male, 80, Dutch footballer.
- Joseph Whiteside, 84, English Olympic swimmer (1928, 1932).

=== 12 ===
- Rifaat el-Mahgoub, 64, Egyptian politician, shot.
- Leonard Krieger, 72, American historian.
- Leif Larsen, 84, Norwegian sailor and war hero.
- Rahman Morina, 47, Yugoslav politician, heart attack.
- John O'Brien, 65, New Zealand politician.
- Frederick Rossini, 91, American thermodynamicist.
- Bridget Bate Tichenor, 72, British surrealist painter and fashion editor.
- Peter Wessel Zapffe, 90, Norwegian philosopher.

=== 13 ===
- Jim Collins, 94, Australian rules footballer.
- Lino Donoso, 68, Cuban baseball player (Pittsburgh Pirates).
- Douglas Edwards, 73, American newscaster, bladder cancer.
- Hans Freudenthal, 85, German-born Dutch mathematician.
- Mario Guerci, 77, Argentine Olympic rower (1948).
- Le Duc Tho, 78, Vietnamese politician and diplomat, Nobel Prize recipient (1973), cancer.
- Hans Namuth, 75, German-American photographer, traffic collision.
- Lewis Veraldi, 60, American automotive engineer, heart attack.

=== 14 ===
- Leonard Bernstein, 72, American conductor and composer (West Side Story), pneumonia.
- Tom Brigance, 77, American fashion designer.
- Leon Brown, 71, American basketball player.
- Daniel Guilet, 91, French-American violinist, cerebral hemorrhage.
- Irina Odoyevtseva, 95, Russian poet, novelist and memoirist.
- Clifton Pugh, 65, Australian artist, heart attack.
- Carin Swensson, 85, Swedish actress.

=== 15 ===
- Tibor Berczelly, 78, Hungarian Olympic fencer (1936, 1948, 1952).
- Helen Bray, 100, American silent film actress.
- Sam Dolgoff, 88, Russian-American anarchist.
- Wilhelm Magnus, 83, German-American mathematician.
- David McCalden, 39, British-American far-right activist, AIDS.
- William Edwin Minshall, Jr., 78, American politician, member of the U.S. House of Representatives (1955–1974).
- Gwen Nelson, 89, English actress.
- Yu Pingbo, 90, Chinese literary critic.
- Boris Piotrovsky, 82, Soviet archaeologist.
- Delphine Seyrig, 58, French actress, ovarian cancer.
- Om Shivpuri, 52, Indian actor, heart attack.
- Vital Van Landeghem, 77, Belgian football player.
- Ramkumar Verma, 85, Hindi poet.

=== 16 ===
- Art Blakey, 71, American drummer, lung cancer.
- Jorge Bolet, 75, Cuban-American pianist, AIDS-related complications.
- Douglas Campbell, 94, American flying ace during World War I.
- Dorothy M. Healy, 76, American historian.
- Berl Huffman, 83, American sports coach.
- Carl Just, 93, Norwegian journalist.
- Ambrose Palmer, 80, Australian rules footballer.
- Blake Pelly, 83, Australian politician and businessman.
- Roger Powell, 94, English bookbinder.
- Giovanni Varglien, 79, Italian footballer.
- Alexander Zakin, 87, Russian-American pianist, heart failure.

=== 17 ===
- Ralph Bowman, 79, Canadian ice hockey player (Ottawa Senators, St. Louis Eagles, Detroit Red Wings).
- Denis Cordner, 66, Australian footballer.
- Harry Fletcher, 80, Australian politician.
- Emil Görlitz, 87, Polish footballer and Olympian (1924).
- Seth Morgan, 41, American novelist, traffic collision.
- Jordan Olivar, 75, American football player, cancer.
- Tadashige Ono, 81, Japanese artist.
- Paul Seabury, 67, American political scientist, kidney failure.

=== 18 ===
- Michael Bigg, 50, English-Canadian marine biologist, leukemia.
- Marie-France Dufour, 41, French singer, leukemia.
- Nick Etten, 77, American baseball player (Philadelphia Athletics, Philadelphia Phillies, New York Yankees).
- Pyotr Fedoseyev, 82, Soviet philosopher.
- Sol Furth, 83, American Olympic jumper (1932).
- Sir Ben Lockspeiser, 99, British scientific administrator (CERN).
- Harry Marker, 91, American film editor.
- Heinz Oskar Vetter, 72, German politician.

=== 19 ===
- Jerry Cronin, 65, Irish politician, Parkinson's disease.
- Haim Gvati, 89, Israeli zionist activist and politician.
- René Highway, 35, Canadian dancer, AIDS.
- Augusto Tiezzi, 80, Italian cinematographer.
- Samuel Wilbert Tucker, 77, American lawyer.
- Lew Worsham, 73, American golfer.

=== 20 ===
- Colette Audry, 84, French writer.
- Américo Hoss, 76, Hungarian-Argentine cinematographer.
- Freda Jackson, 82, English actress.
- Alma Theodora Lee, 78, Australian botanist and plant taxonomist.
- Joel McCrea, 84, American actor, pneumonia.
- Kona Prabhakara Rao, 74, Indian politician, cardiopulmonary failure.

=== 21 ===
- Karl Egil Aubert, 66, Norwegian mathematician.
- Tom Carvel, 84, Greek-American businessman.
- Dany Chamoun, 56, Lebanese politician, murdered.
- Eugen Haugland, 78, Norwegian triple jumper and Olympian (1936).
- Freddie Hooghiemstra, 59, Dutch Olympic field hockey player (1960).
- Jo Ann Kelly, 46, English musician, brain cancer.
- Lotar Olias, 76, German composer.
- Brij Sadanah, 57, Indian filmmaker, suicide by gunshot.
- Prabhat Rainjan Sarkar, 69, Indian composer and guru, heart attack.
- Athol Shmith, 76, Australian photographer.
- Ruth Stockton, 74, American politician.
- Frank Waddey, 85, American baseball player (St. Louis Browns).

=== 22 ===
- Louis Althusser, 72, French philosopher, heart attack.
- Jack Doherty, 75, Australian rules footballer.
- Gerry Hickey, 78, Australian rules footballer.
- Kamil Lhoták, 78, Czechoslovak artist.
- Nikolay Rybnikov, 59, Soviet and Russian film actor, heart attack.
- Frank Sinkwich, 70, American football player, Heisman Trophy recipient.

=== 23 ===
- Norman Buchan, 67, British politician.
- P. K. Kelkar, 81, Indian scientist.
- Berthold Lubetkin, 88, Georgian-British architect.
- Zephania Mothopeng, 77, South African political activist, lung cancer.
- Dave Murray, 37, Canadian skier and Olympian (1976, 1980), skin cancer.
- Bob Scott, 95, Australian rules footballer.
- Thomas Williams, 63, American novelist, lung cancer.

=== 24 ===
- André Aumerle, 83, French Olympic cyclist (1928).
- Jim Clark, 63, American baseball player (Washington Senators).
- Ivan Krevs, 77, Yugoslavian Olympic long-distance runner (1936).
- Boris Maluev, 61, Soviet and Russian painter.
- John Sex, 34, American singer, AIDS.
- Richard Tyler, 62, American sound engineer.

=== 25 ===
- Ed Bagdon, 64, American football player (Chicago Cardinals, Washington Redskins).
- Max Biggs, 67, American basketball player.
- Leif Børresen, 81, Norwegian footballer.
- Major Holley, 66, American bassist, heart attack.
- Zara Mints, 63, Soviet literary scientist.
- Bennie Oosterbaan, 84, American football player.
- Alberto da Costa Pereira, 60, Portuguese footballer.
- Ikey Robinson, 86, American banjoist.
- Williamson A. Sangma, 71, Indian politician.
- Heber Smith, 75, Canadian politician, member of the House of Commons of Canada (1957-1968).

=== 26 ===
- Lawrence Andreasen, 44, American Olympic diver (1964), accidental fall.
- Robert Antelme, 73, French writer.
- Joan Brown, 52, American painter, blunt force trauma, accident.
- Arne Dagfin Dahl, 96, Norwegian soldier.
- Guillermo Garcia Gonzales, 36, Cuban chess Grandmaster, traffic collision.
- Breandán Ó hEithir, 60, Irish writer and broadcaster.
- Ödön Lendvay, 47, Hungarian Olympic basketball player (1964).
- William S. Paley, 89, American television executive, kidney failure.
- Johnny Sanders, 68, American football executive, heart failure.
- Harry Wilson, 88, American multi-athlete.

=== 27 ===
- Chet Adams, 75, American football player (Cleveland Rams, Green Bay Packers, Cleveland Browns).
- Rafael Banquells, 73, Cuban-Mexican actor, director and TV producer.
- Dudley Bragg. 73, Australian rules footballer.
- Xavier Cugat, 90, Spanish musician, heart failure.
- Bob Davie, 78, Canadian ice hockey player (Boston Bruins).
- Jacques Demy, 59, French film director (The Umbrellas of Cherbourg, The Young Girls of Rochefort, Bay of Angels) and lyricist, AIDS.
- Princess Sophie of Hohenberg, 89, Austrian noble, daughter of Archduke Franz Ferdinand of Austria.
- Wacław Kowalski, 74, Polish actor.
- Garvin Mugg, 69, American football player (Detroit Lions).
- Leo O'Halloran, 65, Australian rules footballer.
- Elliott Roosevelt, 80, American general and politician, son of Franklin D. Roosevelt, heart failure.
- Woodrow Bradley Seals, 72, American district judge (United States District Court for the Southern District of Texas).
- Ugo Tognazzi, 68, Italian actor and filmmaker, cerebral hemorrhage.
- Béla Volentik, 82, Hungarian football player.

=== 28 ===
- Aleksandra Chudina, 66, Soviet Olympic athlete (1952), stomach cancer.
- Ernst Rudolf Huber, 87, German jurist.
- Gervasio, 42, Uruguayan singer.
- Kolau Nadiradze, 95, Soviet poet.
- Geminio Ognio, 72, Italian Olympic water polo player (1948, 1952).
- Robert Jan Verbelen, 79, Belgian nazi collaborator during World War II.

=== 29 ===
- Aleksei Alelyukhin, 70, Soviet flying ace during World War II.
- Joseph Attles, 87, American actor.
- Herbert Brodkin, 77, American producer and director of film and television.
- Emrys Roberts, 80, Welsh politician.
- William French Smith, 73, American lawyer, attorney general (1981–1985), cancer.
- Juha Vainio, 52, Finnish musician, heart attack.
- Volker von Collande, 76, German actor and filmmaker.

=== 30 ===
- Wim Gijsen, 57, Dutch author.
- Willy Jürissen, 78, German Olympic football player (1936).
- Harry Lauter, 76, American actor, heart attack.
- Vinod Mehra, 45, Indian actor, heart attack.
- Craig Russell, 42, Canadian drag queen and actor, AIDS.
- Alfred Sauvy, 91, French demographer.
- V. Shantaram, 88, Indian actor and filmmaker.
- Tom Steele, 81, American stuntman.
- Piroska Szekrényessy, 74, Hungarian pair skater and Olympian (1936).
- Kwok Tak-Seng, 79, Hong Kong businessman, heart attack.
- Germaine Van Dievoet, 91, Belgian Olympic swimmer (1920).

=== 31 ===
- Carl Belew, 59, American country musician, cancer.
- Harold Caccia, Baron Caccia, 84, British diplomat.
- Bert Cadieu, 87, Canadian politician, member of the House of Commons of Canada (1958-1972, 1974-1979).
- Vasco de Carvalho, 88, Brazilian Olympic rower (1932).
- Jim Foster, 55, American LGBT activist, AIDS.
- Ukko Hietala, 86, Finnish Olympic modern pentathlete (1936).
- Aya Kōda, 86, Japanese novelist, heart attack.
- Hugh McPhillips, 70, American actor and television director, traffic collision.
- Ivan Porter, 72, Australian rules footballer.
- Roger Price, 72, American humorist and author.
- Carmine Saponetti, 77, Italian cyclist.
- Marian Siejkowski, 50, Polish Olympic rower (1964, 1972).
- M. L. Vasanthakumari, 62, Indian singer, cancer.
- André Verdeil, 86, Swiss Olympic ice hockey player (1924).
