= Farci =

Farci is an Italian surname. Notable people with the surname include:

- Giampaolo Farci (born 1937), Italian field hockey player
- Luigi Farci (born 1939), Italian field hockey player
- Patrizia Farci, Italian scientist and hepatologist
