= Vannini =

Vannini is an Italian surname. Notable people with the surname include:

- Alessandro Vannini (born 1938)
- Elia Vannini (1637–1695): Italian Baroque composer and Carmelite friar
- Giuditta Vannini (1859–1911)
- Marco Vannini (born 1943), Italian biologist
- Pietro Vannini (1413/1414–1495/1496), Italian artist and silversmith
- Ottavio Vannini (1585–c. 1643), Italian Baroque painter

== See also ==
- Lucilio Vanini
