= Zwiers =

Zwiers is a Dutch patronymic surname. Zwier is a now rather uncommon given name, a short form of the Germanic name Sweder with the roots swind ("strong") and her ("lord, army"). The given name and surname have many variant spellings, including Sweer(s), Sweert(s), Swier(s), Swiert(s), Zweer(s) Zweert(s), and Zwiert(s). Zwiers and Zweers are now the most common forms. People with these surnames include:

- Emanuel Sweert (1552–1612), Dutch botanist and illustrator
- Jeronimus Sweerts (1603–1636), Dutch still life painter
- Salomon Sweers (1611–1674), Dutch East India Company counsel (Sweers Island was named after him)
- Michiel Sweerts (1618–1664), Flemish painter and printmaker
- Isaac Sweers (1622–1673), Dutch admiral, brother of Salomon (HNLMS Isaac Sweers was named after him)
- Bernard Zweers (1854–1924), Dutch composer and music teacher
- Henri Zwiers (1900 – 1992), Dutch architect
- Eddie Zwier (born 1934), Dutch field hockey player
- Nel Zwier (1936–2001), Dutch high jumper
- Frank Zweerts (born 1943), Dutch field hockey player
- Jeroen Zweerts (born 1945), Dutch field hockey player, brother of Frank
- Leon Zwier (born 1957), Australian lawyer
- Claudia Zwiers (born 1973), Dutch judoka
- Paul Zwier, American jurist

== See also ==
- 6213 Zwiers, main belt asteroid named after Hendrikus Johannes Zwiers (1865–1923), Dutch astronomer at the Leiden Observatory
