= Kilde =

Kilde is a surname. Notable people with it include:

- Aleksander Aamodt Kilde (born 1992), Norwegian alpine ski racer
- Bent Kilde (born 1938), Danish field hockey player
- Jeanne Halgren Kilde, American academic
- Tollef Kilde (1853–1947), Norwegian forest owner, business founder, and politician
