= Glarner =

Glarner is a surname. Notable people with the surname include:

- Fritz Glarner (1899–1972), Swiss-American painter
- Jean Glarner (born 1940), Swiss field hockey player
- Stefan Glarner (born 1987), Swiss footballer

== See also ==
- Garner (surname)
