= Christopher Saunders (disambiguation) =

Christopher Saunders is a disgraced Australian bishop.

Christopher Saunders may also refer to:

- Chris Saunders (headmaster) (born 1940), an English former cricketer and teacher
- Christopher Saunders (dancer), a dancer with the Royal Ballet

== See also ==
- Chris Saunders-Griffiths (1929–2001), a British former hockey player
