= Hans Straub =

Hans Straub may refer to:

- Hans Straub (canoeist)
- Hans Straub (field hockey)
