= Erik Frandsen =

Erik Frandsen may refer to:

- Erik Frandsen (field hockey) (1923–1974), Danish field hockey player
- Erik Frandsen (musician), American actor, guitarist, and singer-songwriter
- Erik A. Frandsen (born 1957), Danish artist
