= Zweerts =

Zweerts is a Dutch patronymic surname. it may refer to:

- Frank Zweerts (born 1943), Dutch field hockey player
- Jeroen Zweerts (born 1945), Dutch field hockey player, brother of Frank

== See also ==
- Zwiers, surname of the same origin
