= Daniel Rabel =

French painter

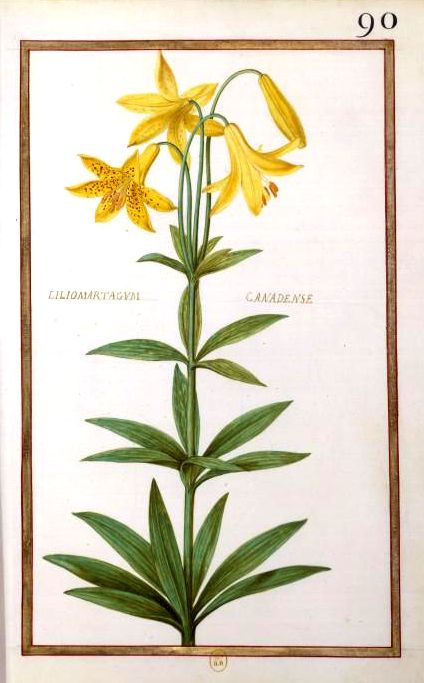
Lilium martagon from "Theatrum florae" (1624)

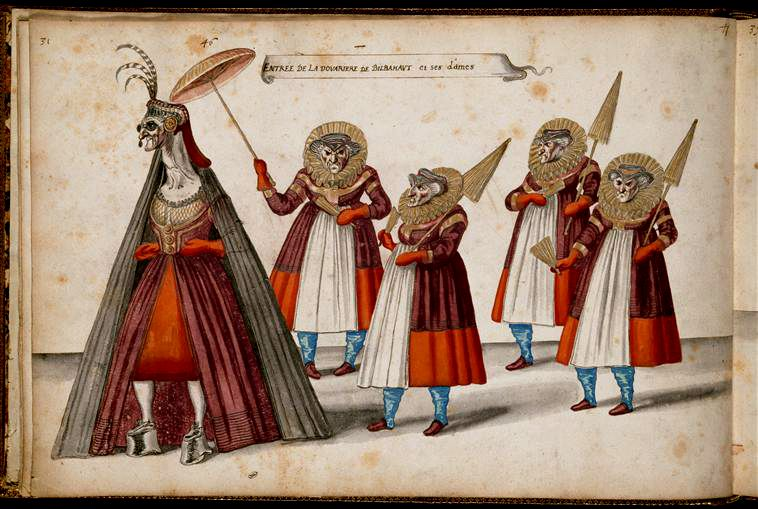
"Ballet de la Douairière de Billebahaut" "Entrée de la Douairière et de ses dames"

Daniel Rabel (1578 – 3 January 1637) was a Renaissance French painter, engraver, miniaturist, botanist and natural history illustrator. He was the son of Jean Rabel (1545–1603) who was official artist at the court of Henri III. Rabel was first employed as a portrait painter by Marie de Medicis, the second wife of Henry IV of France. He served as Engineer in Ordinary for the King for the provinces of Brie and Champagne.

In 1612 he became official artist to the Duke of Nevers. In 1618 he moved to Saint-Germain-des-Prés, where he painted "Suite de fleurs" and "Ballet de la douairière de Bilbao". He also painted landscapes in oil, as well as hunting scenes. About 1631 he was appointed official artist to Gaston, Duke of Orléans, Henri IV's third son. He went to Paris, commissioned by Louis XIII to paint a portrait of his betrothed, Anne of Austria.

The "Theatrum Florae" was originally published in Paris in 1622, with later editions in 1627 and 1633, and was a collection of botanical illustrations of 69 of the most striking plants then available, and which Rabel had been commissioned to paint for Gaston of Orléans. Other artists later added their work, notably Nicolas Robert (1614–1685). The plates eventually numbered over 6000 and are kept in the Muséum national d'histoire naturelle in Paris. There is some doubt among scholars as to whether Rabel engraved the original 69 plates, as none of them is signed and his name only appears on the title of the third edition. By the end of the 1700s they were generally assumed to have been done by Emanuel Sweert.

From 1617 until his death in 1637, Rabel was a set designer for theatres and for ballets de cour, and designed ballet costumes. He made deliberate use of a sixteenth-century tradition of the grotesque in the creation of his exaggerated comic figures, and the extreme facial distortions he uses, such as 'grotesquely swollen and disjointed necks, protruding chins, exaggerated hooked and drooping noses, and glaring, squinting eyes'. These owe a lot to the grotesque caricatures by the German artist Hans Weiditz, and the printmakers Peter Flötner and Erhard Schön. In turn, Rabel's work influenced Inigo Jones, as well as other European artists of the period. Two of Rabel's ballets were:

- "Ballet des fées des forêts de Saint-Germain" (First performed in February 1625 in the Louvre Palace's Lower Great Room)
- "Ballet royal du grand bal de la douairière de Billebahaut" (First performed in February 1626, also in the Louvre's Lower Great Room)

In the performance of Les Fées des forêts de Saint-Germain at the Louvre in February 1625, Louis XIII danced in the role of a "valiant fighter".

Rabel was banished to Blois by Cardinal Mazarin. Here he founded the first botanical garden of the province and imported many species from the Antilles through his doctor, Brunyer. He died in Paris, but his descendants continued to live in Blois.

His widow, Anthoinette Guibourg, married Jacques de Bellville, a friend of the family and the King's ballet master and choreographer.

Among other things, he created an illuminated Bible and published a book on the arms of Germany. Like his father, Jean Rabel, he did work for the astronomer Nicolas de Peiresc, a pupil of Galileo's, and is thought to have produced the first important map of the Moon, a year before his death. In 1633 Peiresc wrote to Rabel and asked him to do drawings of some antique vases.

The Bibliothèque nationale de France holds the originals of his "Recueil de cent fleurs et insectes".

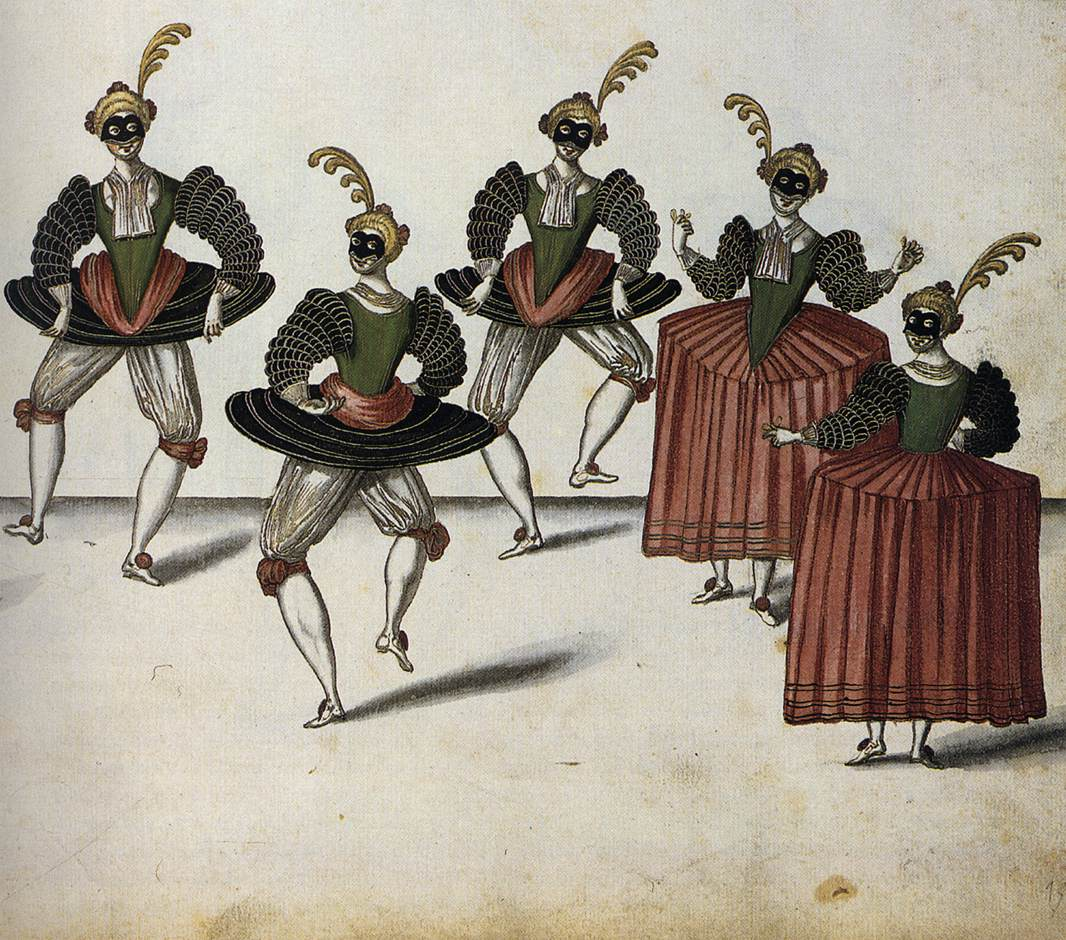
The Royal Ballet of the Dowager of Bilbao's Grand Ball

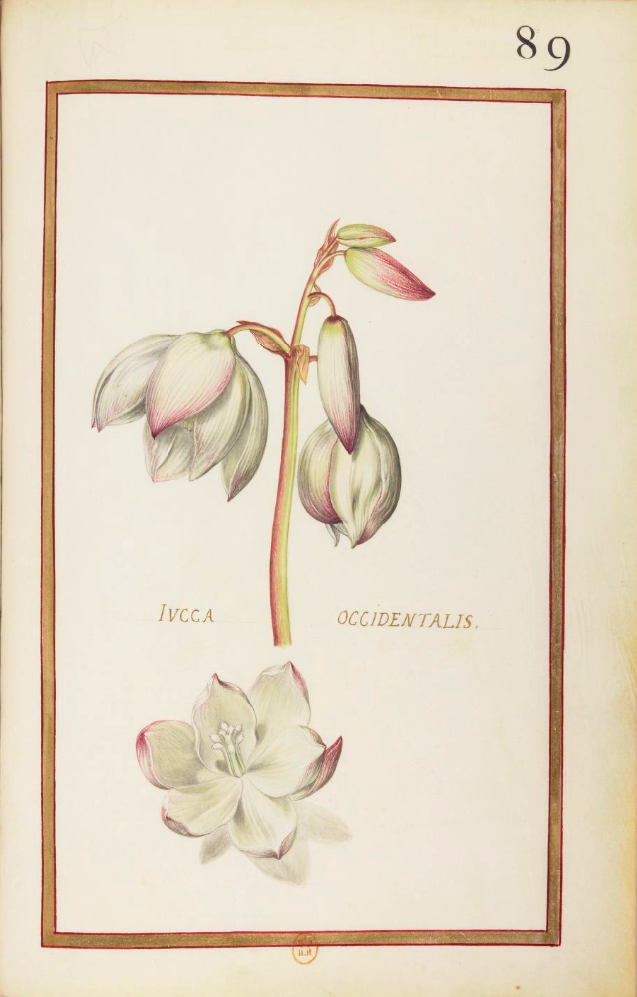
Iucca occidentalis, 1624. Recueil de fleurs et d'insectes dessinés et peints sur vélin

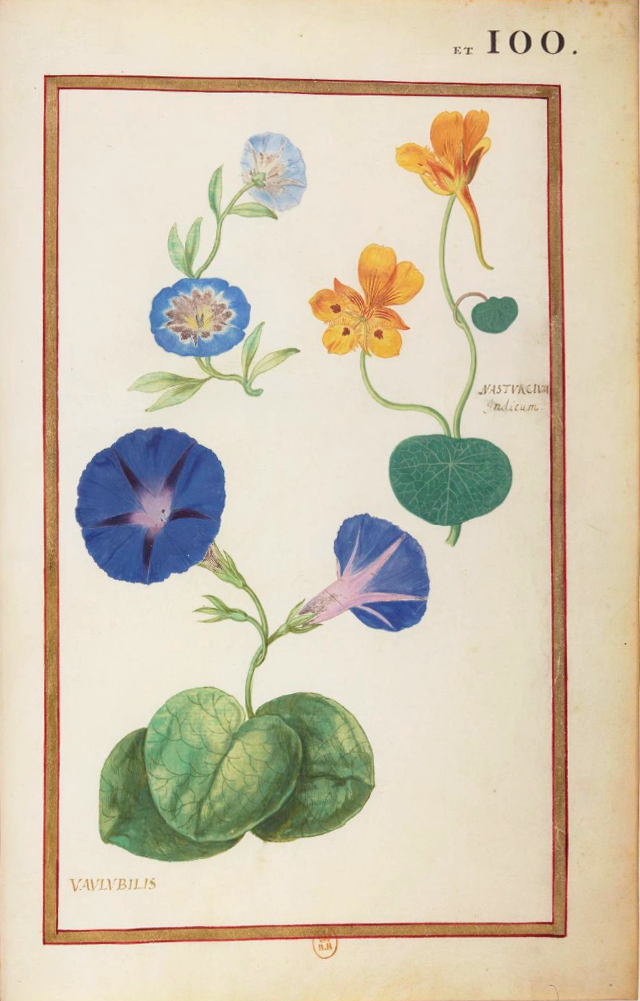
Nasturcium indicum, vaulubilis, 1624 Recueil de fleurs et d'insectes dessinés et peints sur vélin

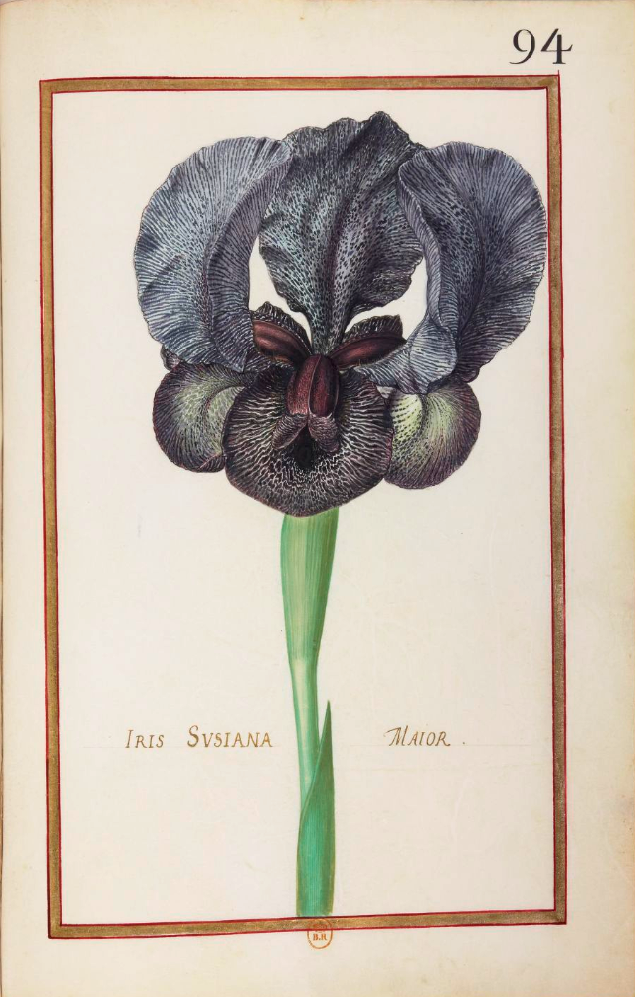
Iris susiana maior, 1624. Recueil de fleurs et d'insectes dessinés et peints sur vélin

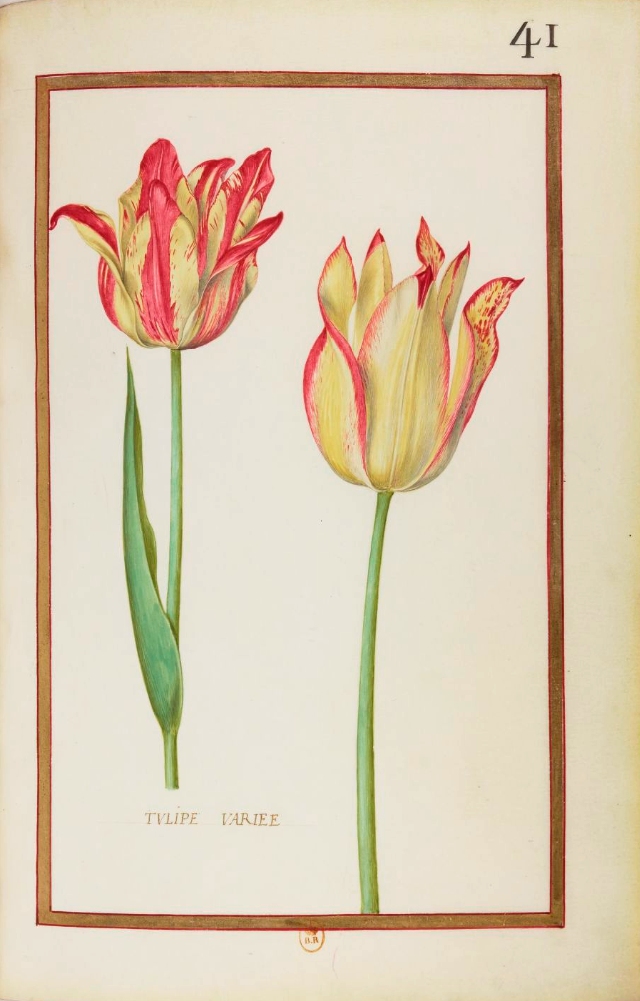
Tulipe variee, 1624. Recueil de fleurs et d'insectes dessinés et peints sur vélin

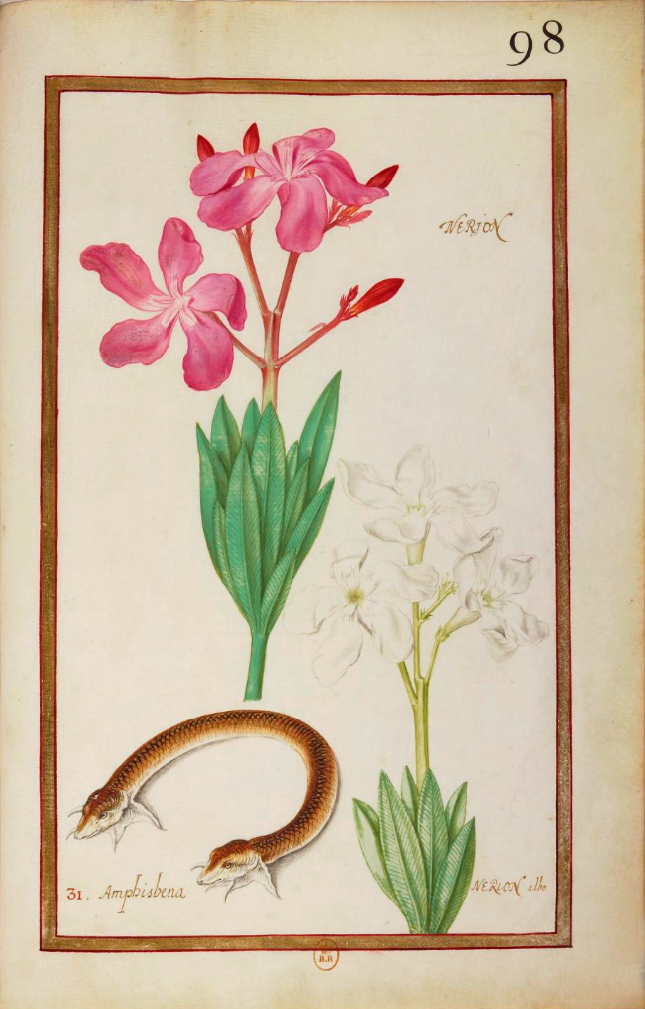
Nerion, amphisbena, nerion albo, 1624. Recueil de fleurs et d'insectes dessinés et peints sur vélin

== Bibliography ==
- VK Preston, "Baroque Relations: Performing Silver and Gold in Daniel Rabel's 'Ballets of the Americas.'" In The Oxford Handbook of Dance and Reenactment, ed. Mark Franko. Oxford and New York: Oxford University Press, 2017 [2018 online]. ISBN 9780199314201.
- Daniel Rabel, Cent fleurs et insectes
- Daniel Rabel, Livre de differants desseings de parterres 1600–1640
- Daniel Rabel, Theatrum florae 1627
- Daniel Rabel, Cartouches de diferentes inuentions tres utilles a plussieurs sortes de personnes 1632
- E. T. Hamy, Jean Le Roy de la Boissière et Daniel Rabel, peintres d'histoire naturelle du commencement du XVIIe siècle ... Editor: Paris, Masson et cie
- Léo R. Schidlof, La Miniature en Europe, Graz, Akademiche Druck Verlagsanstalt, 1964, vol. II (M-Z).
