= Jeronimus Sweerts =

Dutch Golden Age still life painter

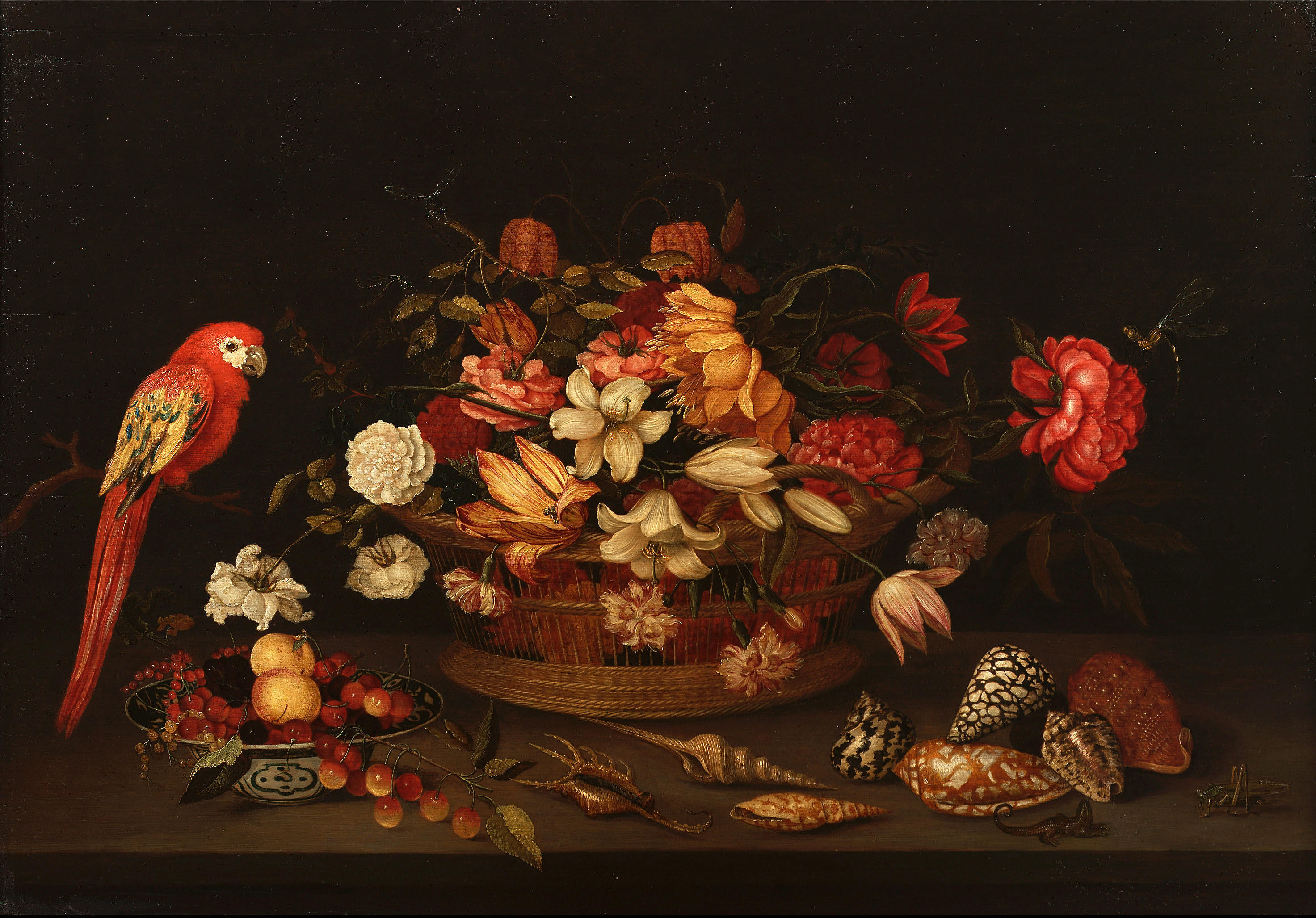
Flowers in a basket with shells and a bird and a bowl of fruit

Jeronimus Sweerts (1603–1636), was a Dutch Golden Age still life painter.

== Biography ==
He was born in Amsterdam as the son of Emmanuel Sweerts, a botanist who published a florilegium in 1612. He was a pupil of Ambrosius Bosschaert the Elder and after his death in 1621, stayed on with Balthasar van der Ast, marrying Bosschaert's daughter Maria in 1627. Sweerts was the father of the printmaker Hieronymus Sweerts (1629–1696).

He died in Amsterdam.
