= Bali Mauladad =

Big game hunter

- Born: Muhammad Iqbal Mauladad; 30 August 1926; Nairobi, Kenya
- Died: 18 February 1970 (aged 43); Aga Khan University Hospital, Nairobi, Kenya
- Occupation: Professional game hunter
- Spouse: Riaz Mauladad
- Children: 5

Bali won the Shaw & Hunter trophy in 1966 for guiding a hunter to an Oribi gazelle whose horns were 7 inches long – a new world record.

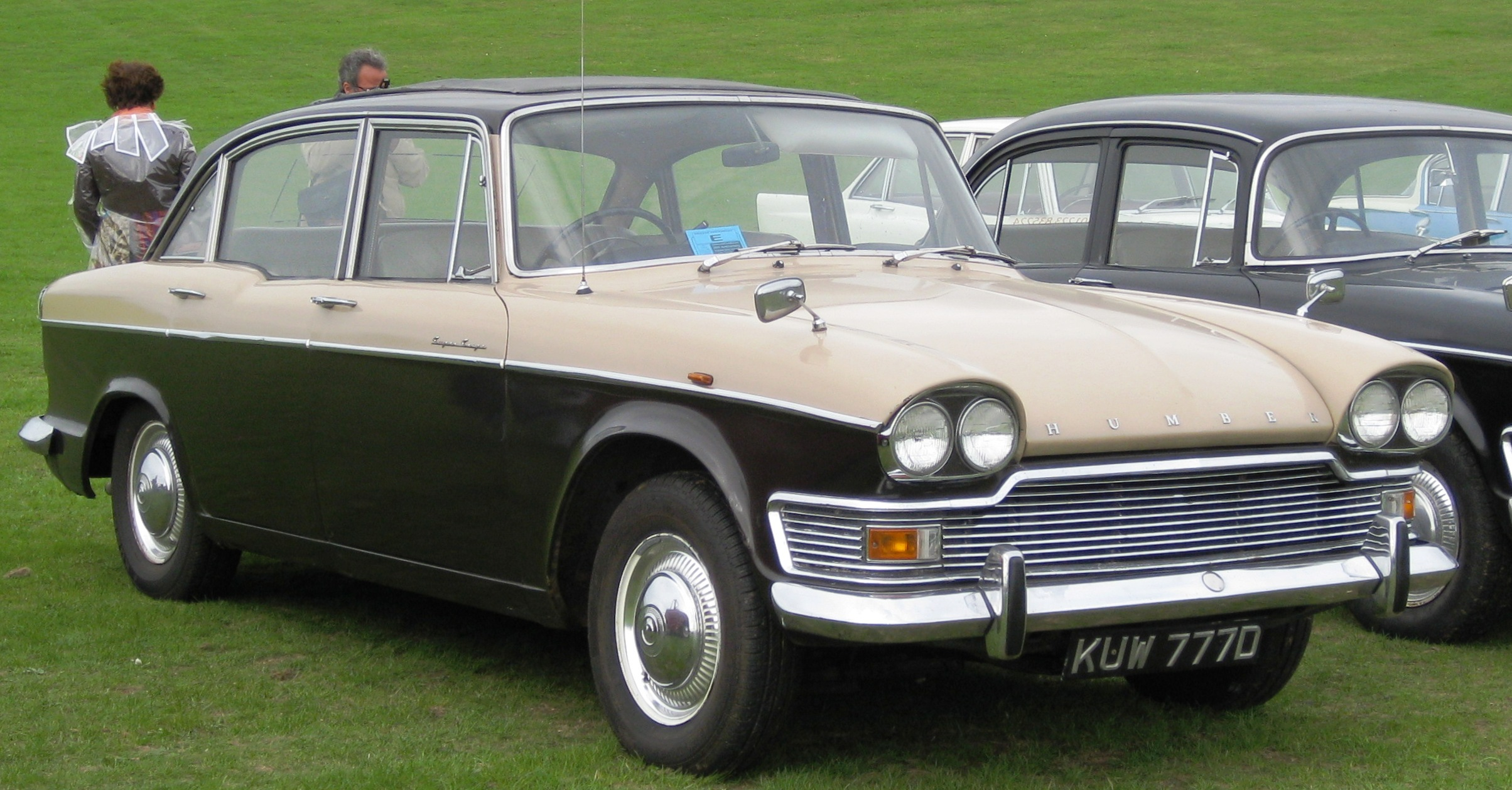
A late-model Humber Super Snipe similar to that used for the Safari Rally

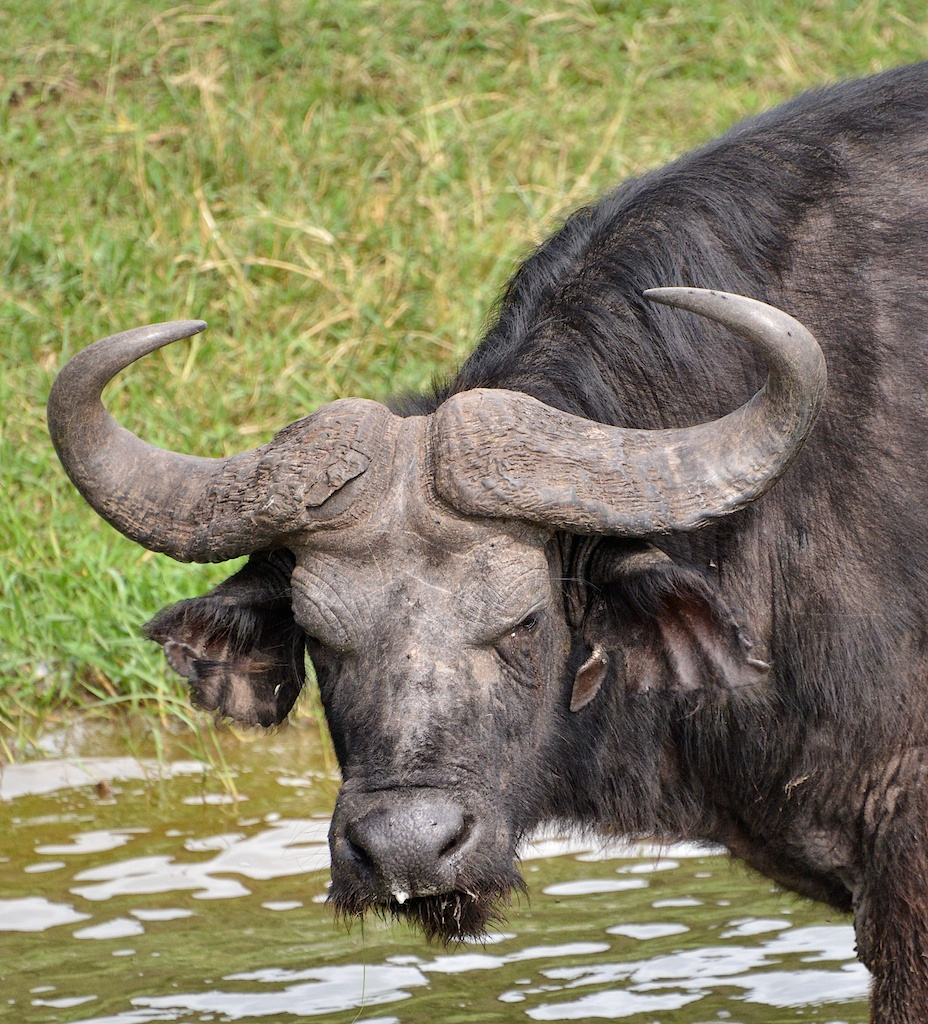
He died after being gored by a buffalo.

Muhammad Iqbal Mauladad (1926–1970), nicknamed Bali, was a big game hunter in Kenya.

He was born into a rich and influential family of Kenyan Asians but, rather than joining the family engineering business, he became a professional hunter, leading parties on safari to hunt large animals, especially elephant. He was the first Muslim to be recognised as a white hunter and won the Shaw & Hunter trophy for best professional guide in 1966. He also competed in the Safari Rally, placing fourth in 1961. He died in 1970, following severe goring by a Cape buffalo.

== Early life ==
He came from a rich family as his father, Chaudry Mauladad, was a successful civil engineer in East Africa. He attended the Government Indian School in Nairobi and his father then taught him construction and contracting. But, from the age of ten, he had learned to shoot a rifle and so, rather than join the family business like his brother Basheer, he chose to be a professional hunter in Kenya where he was born and spent his life.

== Career ==
He joined the well-established business, Safariland, after World War Two and was successful as a big game hunter, leading rich clients on safari and killing many game animals, especially elephant. The hunters he guided included the King and Queen of Nepal and the Governor of Colorado, Teller Ammons. British shooting-brakes were converted into safari cars for these shooting parties and he designed a lightweight rifle rack for these which was made in Naroibi for him and most of the other hunters by the gunsmiths Wali Mohamed & Co.

Though he was from a Kenyan Asian background, he was admitted to the East African Professional Hunter's Association which was normally only open to white hunters. He was the first Muslim to be recognised in this way. His closest colleague in the hunting business was another Asian, Ikram Hassan, whose business was African Hunting Safaris, and they hunted elephant together in the coastal regions of Kenya.

He was a large, powerful man, weighing 250 pounds (110 kg) and standing over six feet (1.8 m) in his prime. He had a distinctive moustache and a warm, extrovert manner which made him popular with clients and the other hunters. He liked joking and jazz, racehorses and rifles, fast cars and food, women and whisky – his favourite was Johnny Walker Black Label. Besides hunting, he was also an enthusiastic cricket player and rally driver. He took part in the Safari Rally four times. In 1961, he and Lee M. Talbot placed fourth, driving a Humber Super Snipe over 3,000 miles (4,800 km). He also took part in the 1956 production of the movie Bhowani Junction on location in Lahore.

He was awarded the prestigious Shaw & Hunter prize for leading a client, Donald Harris, to the finest trophy of the year on 4 October 1966. This was an Oribi antelope whose horns measured 7 inches (18 cm), beating the previous world record of 6 1/4 inches (16 cm). The small size of the antelope was incongruous because Bali was himself known for his prowess in hunting elephants with enormous ivory tusks of up to 152 pounds (69 kg).

Hunting was dangerous as he was once mauled by a leopard and finally gored by a buffalo in Kibwezi. The buffalo inflicted injuries which ruptured his liver and, despite treatment and recuperation, complications subsequently led to his death in 1970.

== See also ==
- List of famous big game hunters
