= Basheer Mauladad =

Civil engineer

Basheer Mauladad (1931–2014) was a prominent Kenyan Asian historian. His father, Chaudry Mauladad, was a successful civil engineer in East Africa. Mauladad took over the family business while his older brother, Iqbal, became the famous white hunter, "Bali". Mauladad was influential in breaking down the colour bar in Kenya and negotiating independence. He was also a prominent philanthropist and historian for the Kenyan Asian community.
