= Salim Lone =

Kenyan journalist

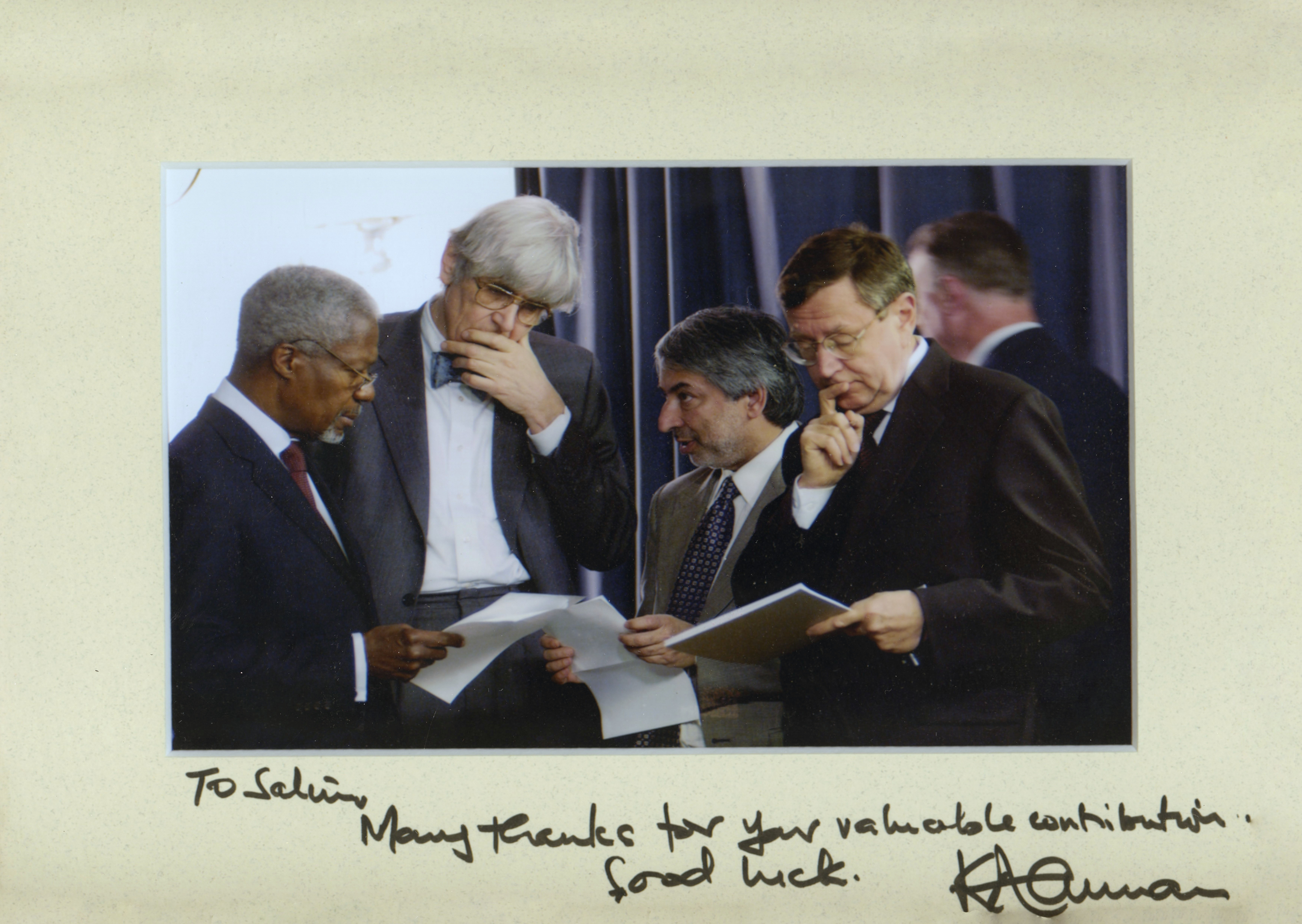
19 March 2003. Upon US invasion of Iraq, UN Sec-Gen Kofi Annan, and his communications team - Salim Lone (centre), Edward Mortimer and Fred Eckhard - discussing Mr Annan's draft statement on the outbreak of the war..

Salim Lone is a Kenyan journalist who was Prime Minister Raila Odinga's Spokesman (2007–2013, 2017–2018), and before that was a Director of Communications under Kofi Annan at the United Nations, where he worked for two decades until retiring in 2003. His final UN assignment was as the Spokesman in Baghdad for the head of the UN mission in Iraq, Sergio Vieira de Mello, who was killed with 21 other colleagues in a terrorist attack at the Canal Hotel in Baghdad; Salim Lone survived the bombing. Salim is now writing a book on Kenya's political evolution in the post-Moi democratic era.

Salim Lone has also been a columnist for the Daily Nation of Kenya (2005–2007), and his commentaries have also been published in The NY Times, The Guardian, The Independent, The Financial Times in the UK, the Washington Post, The New Republic and The New York Review of Books. He has been frequently interviewed by the BBC, Al Jazeera and CNN, including on Charlie Rose, Newsnight, Inside Story and Larry King Live.

Earlier, after working two years for the renowned Lester Markel, the Pulitzer prize-winning Editor of the Sunday New York Times, he returned to Kenya, where was the Editor-in-Chief between 1971 and 1982 of the Sunday Post and Viva magazine, the only mainstream media in the Kenyatta and Moi eras which consistently presented the political opposition's point of view. He is the only journalist in independent Kenya to have been prosecuted and convicted (along with democracy and environmental activist Wangari Maathai, later the Nobel Peace Prize winner) in court for his work (1981), and had to flee the country in 1982 to avoid arrest. His citizenship was subsequently revoked by President Moi for "disloyalty" to Kenya in 1986 but restored in 1993.

== Early career and exile ==
Salim Lone is a Kenyan of South Asian descent, both sets of his grandparents having migrated to East Africa over 100 years ago. Lone himself was born in 1943 in Jhelum in India in 1943, in what is now the Pakistani province of Punjab, when his father was doing university studies there, and is of Kashmiri descent. Lone attended Park Road Primary School and Duke of Gloucester (Now Jamhuri High) School in Nairobi. He won a scholarship to study literature at Kenyon College in the United States (BA, 1965) as part of a major programme that President Kennedy initiated for university education for newly independent African countries, popularly known as the "US airlift." He obtained his MA at New York University (1967) and was studying for his PhD when he won a Rockefeller Foundation fellowship to teach and do research at Makerere University in 1968, but could not take up his appointment. He had worked at The Village Voice of New York's Greenwich Village as a summer intern in 1963 and 1964, but he began a career in journalism in the early 1970s in New York, where he worked for two years for the Sunday NY Times Pulitzer Prize-winning Editor Emeritus Lester Markel as a researcher and writer.

In Kenya in Dec 1971 he became Editor of the Sunday Post at age 28, but quickly came under pressure for articles critical of Jomo Kenyatta's, and (after 1978), Daniel arap Moi's governments.

Forced out of the Sunday Post in 1974, Lone became founding editor of Viva, a politically conscious women's magazine in Kenya, which won widespread Kenyan and international recognition, with the United Nations in 1980 during the Copenhagen Women's Conference listing it as one of the world's eight most influential women's magazines, along with Ms. in the US, Emma in Germany and Manushi in India. The magazine regularly highlighted the issues of poverty, corruption, women's rights and diminishing freedoms of expression and association in Kenya. Lone was regularly grilled and harassed by Special Branch police officers, and in 1981 became the only journalist in independent Kenya to have been prosecuted and convicted for his journalistic work, along with the Nobel Peace Prize Winner, the Kenyan environmental and pro-democracy fighter Wangari Maathai. Eventually, his troubles under the Daniel arap Moi regime worsened to the point where he fled to the US to avoid arrest in June 1982. His citizenship was subsequently and illegally revoked by President Moi for "disloyalty" to Kenya, but continuing protests by the United Nations staff in NY and Geneva by and human rights organizations saw it restored in 1993.

== United Nations ==
Upon arriving in New York in 1982, he was hired by the UN as a communications officer. Invited back to Kenya in 1986 by Foreign Minister Elijah Mwangale, he was arrested and taken to Nyayo House's infamous torture chambers. He was freed under pressure from the United Nations and expelled from Kenya, and his citizenship was revoked. Back at the UN, Lone rose to its highest non-political rank when he was appointed by UN secretary General Kofi Annan as Director of its News and Media Division (1998–2003). Earlier, as Chief of Publications, Lone worked closely with Secretary General Boutros Boutros-Ghali as Chief Editor and writer to initiate and publish the scholarly UN Blue Books series which documented the role the Organization played in mobilizing global support for pivotal issues of the 20th century, such as opposition to apartheid, the advancement of women, the Nuclear Non-Proliferation Treaty and the genocides in the former Yugoslavia and Rwanda, whose criminal courts became models for the International Criminal Court. Lone's last UN assignment was as UN Spokesman in Iraq right after the 2003 US-led invasion. His boss Sergio Vieira de Mello and 21 other colleagues in Baghdad were killed in a terrorist attack on Canal Hotel in August, but Lone survived with minor injuries.

== Kenyan political spokesperson ==
After retiring from the UN, Lone returned to Kenya in 2004 after he was appointed the Government Spokesman for the Mwai Kibaki regime, the first democratically elected government since Kenya's December 1963 independence, but the appointment was rescinded before he actually took it up. He then became Spokesman for Raila Odinga, the opposition leader and was the communications director for the first 2005 referendum on a new Constitution which the Opposition won. After that he became a columnist for the Daily Nation, and wrote regular columns for the Guardian, UK, and was published in many other newspapers such as The NY Times, The Washington Post, The Globe and Mail (Toronto), The Financial Times, The Independent, The Times of India and Dawn (Pakistan). Earlier he had been published by the NY Review of Books and The New Republic. Lone was also frequently interviewed by the BBC, Al Jazeera and CNN, including on Charlie Rose, Newsnight, Inside Story and Larry King Live. He was the principal figure in three documentaries on the disastrous US-led in the Iraq war and occupation, by Al Jazeera, and the public TV stations of Japan (NHK) and the Netherlands.

In an op-ed he wrote in the New York Times, Lone condemned the 2006 Ethiopian invasion of Somalia as, "...an illegal war of aggression against the Union of Islamic Courts." He further stated his belief that, "The best antidote to terrorism in Somalia is stability, which the Islamic Courts have provided. The Islamists have strong public support, which has grown in the face of U.S. and Ethiopian interventions. As in other Muslim-Western conflicts, the world needs to engage with the Islamists to secure peace."

In 2007 he again became Spokesman for Raila Odinga before the 2007 presidential election. But Lone's forceful public advocacy for a robust international involvement in finding a negotiated solution to end the mass violence that followed the tainted presidential election - which resulted in President Kibaki having to create the position of Prime Minister for Mr Odinga - led to many death threats, and he had to flee Kenya again.

Lone returned to Nairobi when an Accord mediated by the international community under former UN Secretary General Kofi Annan's leadership was signed by President Mwai Kibaki and opposition leader Raila Odinga (who was named Prime Minister under the Accord) Lone subsequently resigned from his government position in September 2008 but continued to be Prime Minister Odinga's Spokesman till 2013,

After the disputed March 2013 election, it fell upon Lone to announce that Prime Minister Odinga would not accept the 2013 election result as the vote-tallying process was marred by vast discrepancies, but that he would pursue electoral justice through courts without the mass demonstrations his supporters were demanding. The Supreme Court upheld the election verdict and declared Uhuru Kenyatta lawfully elected president.

Salim Lone once again received death threats and left Kenya permanently soon after the election.

== The book "War and Peace in Kenya" ==
Lone now lives in Princeton, New Jersey, where he is writing his book - War and Peace in Kenya - on the extraordinary transformations and disasters that marked the Mwai Kibaki and Raila Odinga era in the 2003-2013 period (and the subsequent Uhuru Kenyatta presidency). The book also examines how change takes place in a country in which fabulous wealth and utter deprivation exist side and side, and where a powerful elite has controlled all the levers of power and wealth throughout the half century of independence. The book pays particular attention to the role, both positive and negative, the international community (including US President Barack Obama) played in this period, especially in the crimes against humanity trials of President Uhuru Kenyatta and Deputy President William Ruto at the International Criminal Court in The Hague. The book is supported by grants from the Ford Foundation, the Open Society Institute, the Institute of International Education and the Norwegian government.
