= Jamhuri High School =

School in Kenya

Coordinates: 1°16′19″S 36°49′22″E

Jamhuri High School, formerly known as Government Indian School and later The Duke of Gloucester School, is one of the oldest schools in Kenya. It was founded as a Railway Educational Centre in 1906. Prior to Kenya's independence from the British, the school, located at Ngara Nairobi, predominantly enrolled students from the Indian community in Nairobi, hence its former name Government Indian School. After Kenya gained independence, Justin Odhiambo became the school's first African/Black student.

== History and operations ==
In 1955, the school's name was changed to The Duke of Gloucester School, named after Prince Henry, Duke of Gloucester. After Kenya's independence in 1964 the school was renamed Jamhuri High School. Jamhuri, the Swahili word for Republic, symbolized independence and Kenya's sovereignty as a republic. Since then the school has had a diversified enrolment of students of African, Indian, and White heritage.

The school is popularly known as "Jamuu" and its nickname is "Dukes".

Jamhuri High School has a robust alumni association available on their website

== Notable alumni ==
- Urjit Patel - The 24 Governor for the Reserve bank of India
- Justice Abdul Majid Cockar – former Chief Justice of Kenya
- Samuel Salim Lone – Kenyan journalist; former Director of the News and Media Division, Department of Public Information, of the United Nations
- Bali Mauladad – big-game hunter
- Alfred Mutua – politician who is the governor of Machakos County
- Vimal Shah – chief executive officer, Bidco Africa
- Avtar Singh Sohal - field hockey player
- Surjeet Singh Panesar - field hockey player
- Johnstone Mwakazi - prominent Kenyan journalist.

== See also ==
- Education in Kenya
- List of schools in Kenya
