= Ranjeev Deol =

Canadian field hockey player

Ranjeev Deol (born October 19, 1976, in Lusaka, Zambia) is a Canadian field hockey player, who plays for West Coast Kings HC.

== Career ==
He played club hockey in the Netherlands since 2003, first at HC Rotterdam then HC MOP and later on with HC Den Bosch and in Australia (Woodville HC). After his international career Ranjeev came back to The Netherlands and returned to HC MOP. After 2 seasons he left MOP and now he is playing for MHC MEP.

== International career ==
Deol played in the 2008 Olympic Games (Beijing) and 2010 Hockey World Cup (Delhi) and played his first international senior tournament for the Men's National Team in 1998, at the Commonwealth Games in Kuala Lumpur.

In 2000 Deol missed the Summer Olympics in Sydney, where the Canadians finished tenth.

== Personal life ==
His father Surjeet Singh Deol competed in field hockey for Kenya at two Olympic Games: 1956, 1960.

== International senior competitions ==
- 1998 — Commonwealth Games, Kuala Lumpur (not ranked)
- 2001 — World Cup Qualifier, Edinburgh (8th)
- 2002 — Commonwealth Games, Manchester (6th)
- 2003 — Pan American Games, Santo Domingo (2nd)
- 2004 — Olympic Qualifying Tournament, Madrid (11th)
- 2004 — Pan Am Cup, London (2nd)
- 2007 — Sultan Azlan Shah Cup, Malaysia
- 2007 — Pan American Games, Rio de Janeiro Brazil (1st)
- 2008- Sultan Azlan Shah Cup, Malaysia
- 2008 — Olympic Games, Beijing (10th)
- 2009 — Pan American Cup, Santiago Chile (1st)
- 2009- Champions Challenge, Salta Argentina
- 2010- Hockey World Cup, New Delhi India (11th)
