= Murray Mathieson =

New Zealand hockey player

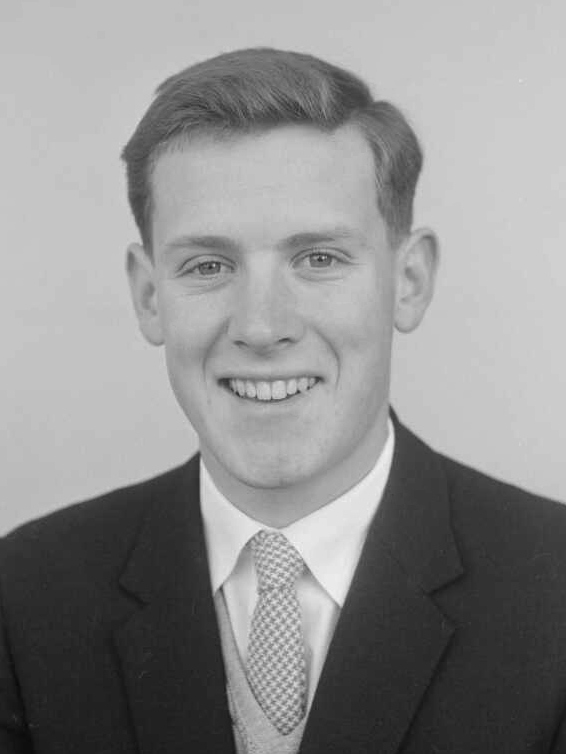
- Mathieson in 1960

Personal information
- Born: 31 March 1942 (age 84) Wellington, New Zealand
- Height: 178 cm (5 ft 10 in)
- Weight: 71 kg (157 lb)

Sport
- Sport: Field hockey

Murray Robert Mathieson (born 31 March 1942) is a retired New Zealand field hockey player. He played one match at the 1960 Summer Olympics where his team placed fifth.
