= Michinori Watada =

Japanese hockey player

Personal information
- Nationality: Japanese
- Born: 3 October 1938 (age 88) Hiroshima, Japan

Sport
- Sport: Field hockey

Michinori Watada (born 3 October 1938) is a Japanese field hockey player. He competed in the men's tournament at the 1960 Summer Olympics.
