= Gerry Hickey =

Australian rules footballer

Personal information
- Full name: Gerry Hickey
- Born: 24 July 1912
- Died: 22 October 1990 (aged 78)
- Height: 185 cm (6 ft 1 in)
- Weight: 86 kg (190 lb)

Playing career^{1}
Years	Club	Games (Goals)
1934–1935	Hawthorn	7 (4)
- ^{1} Playing statistics correct to the end of 1935.

Gerry Hickey (24 July 1912 – 22 October 1990) was an Australian rules footballer who played with Hawthorn in the Victorian Football League (VFL).
