= Pierre Delbecque =

Belgian field hockey player (1930–2011)

Personal information
- Nationality: Belgian
- Born: 17 April 1930 Etterbeek, Belgium
- Died: 2011 (80–81)

Sport
- Sport: Field hockey

Pierre Delbecque (17 April 1930 – 2011) was a Belgian field hockey player. He competed in the men's tournament at the 1960 Summer Olympics. Delbecque died in 2011.
