= Dudley Bragg =

Australian rules footballer, born 1917

Personal information
- Full name: Dudley George Bragg
- Born: 23 February 1917; Geelong, Victoria
- Died: 27 October 1990 (aged 73); Box Hill, Victoria
- Original team: Coburg (VFA)
- Height: 188 cm (6 ft 2 in)
- Weight: 92 kg (203 lb)

Playing career^{1}
Years	Club	Games (Goals)
1940–41, 1944–45	Hawthorn	44 (1)
- ^{1} Playing statistics correct to the end of 1945.

Dudley George Bragg (23 February 1917 – 27 October 1990) was an Australian rules footballer who played with Hawthorn in the Victorian Football League (VFL).

Bragg was residentially tied to the North Melbourne club and he tried out with North Melbourne as a teenager before transferring to Victorian Football Association (VFA) club Coburg and allowed to mature into a fine prospect of a backman. North had first dibs on him. Hawthorn had put an offer for employment that was attractive to him. Hawthorn spent two years trying to entice Bragg from Coburg to the Glenferrie based team. He made his debut in the opening round of 1940 against North Melbourne. His third game was at full back against Jack Titus of Richmond who managed to kick 8 goals against him. Midway through 1941 he suffered a knee injury and was forced to retire. He returned to the club during 1943 and played some reserve grade football. In 1944 and 1945 he was on the main list and added 21 games to his total of 44 games. He retired for good in early 1946 citing troublesome injuries to his legs.
