= George Gordon (Australian footballer) =

Australian rules footballer, born 1902

Personal information
- Full name: George Stuart Gordon
- Born: 14 June 1902; Brighton, Victoria
- Died: 4 October 1990 (aged 88); Berwick, Victoria
- Height: 175 cm (5 ft 9 in)
- Weight: 70 kg (154 lb)

Playing career^{1}
Years	Club	Games (Goals)
1924, 1926–27	Fitzroy	23 (0)
- ^{1} Playing statistics correct to the end of 1927.

George Stuart Gordon (14 June 1902 – 4 October 1990) was an Australian rules footballer who played with Fitzroy in the Victorian Football League (VFL).
