= Carel Dekker =

Dutch field hockey player

Personal information
- Nationality: Dutch
- Born: 22 July 1934 (age 92) Wormerveer, Netherlands

Sport
- Sport: Field hockey

Carel Dekker (born 22 July 1934) is a Dutch field hockey player. He competed in the men's tournament at the 1960 Summer Olympics.
