= Hans Glendrup =

Danish field hockey player

Personal information
- Nationality: Danish
- Born: 27 October 1938 (age 87) Copenhagen, Denmark

Sport
- Sport: Field hockey

Hans Glendrup (born 27 October 1938) is a Danish field hockey player. He competed in the men's tournament at the 1960 Summer Olympics.
