= Albert Vanpoulle =

French hockey player

Personal information
- Nationality: French
- Born: 24 May 1939 (age 87) Lille, France

Sport
- Sport: Field hockey

Albert Vanpoulle (born 24 May 1939) is a French field hockey player. He competed at the 1960 Summer Olympics and the 1968 Summer Olympics.
