= Maurice Dobigny =

French hockey player

Personal information
- Nationality: French
- Born: 19 October 1935 (age 91) Paris, France

Sport
- Sport: Field hockey

Maurice Dobigny (born 19 October 1935) is a French field hockey player. He competed in the men's tournament at the 1960 Summer Olympics.
