= Errol Bill =

Australian field hockey player

Personal information
- Nationality: Australian
- Born: 16 January 1939 (age 87) Temora, Australia

Sport
- Sport: Field hockey

Errol Bill (born 16 January 1939) is an Australian former field hockey player. He competed in the men's tournament at the 1960 Summer Olympics.
