= Yvan Bia =

French hockey player

Personal information
- Nationality: French
- Born: 14 August 1935 (age 91) Calais, France

Sport
- Sport: Field hockey

Yvan Bia (born 14 August 1935) is a French field hockey player. He competed in the men's tournament at the 1960 Summer Olympics.
