= Norbert Schuler =

German hockey player

Personal information
- Nationality: German
- Born: 4 November 1938 (age 87) Nuremberg, Germany

Sport
- Sport: Field hockey

Norbert Schuler (born 4 November 1938) is a German field hockey player. He competed at the 1960 Summer Olympics and the 1968 Summer Olympics.
