= Patrizia Farci =

Italian scientist and hepatologist

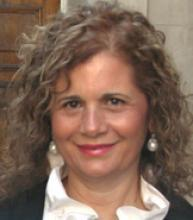
- Education: University of Cagliari (MD)
- Scientific career
- Fields: Hepatology
- Workplaces: University of Cagliari; National Institute of Allergy and Infectious Diseases

Patrizia Farci is an Italian scientist and hepatologist. She is chief of the hepatic pathogenesis section at the National Institute of Allergy and Infectious Diseases. Farci conducts translational research in the field of liver diseases, particularly in the study of pathogenesis of acute and chronic viral hepatitis. She was previously a full professor of medicine and director of the liver unit and the postgraduate school of gastroenterology at the University of Cagliari.

== Education ==
Farci earned a M.D. at the University of Cagliari and then became a board-certified specialist in infectious diseases and gastroenterology at the same university. She was trained at the department of gastroenterology of the Molinette Hospital in Turin under Mario Rizzetto and at the department of medicine of the Royal Free Hospital School of Medicine under Sheila Sherlock.

== Career ==
In 1989, Farci joined the laboratory of Robert H. Purcell in the National Institute of Allergy and Infectious Diseases (NIAID) Laboratory of Infectious Diseases (LID) as a visiting scientist. In 1992, she became associate professor of medicine and, in 2000, full professor of medicine and director of the liver unit and of the postgraduate school of gastroenterology at the University of Cagliari. In 2007, she returned to LID, where in 2010 she became chief of the hepatic pathogenesis section.

At NIAID, Farci conducts translational research in the field of liver diseases, particularly in the study of pathogenesis of acute and chronic viral hepatitis. She also investigates molecular mechanisms of liver fibrosis progression and regression, the role of liver cirrhosis in the pathogenesis of hepatocellular carcinoma, the role of neutralizing antibodies in the prevention and control of hepatitis C virus (HCV) infection, HCV evolution and clinical outcome, and the search for new hepatitis agents.
