= Giovanni Mazzalupi =

Italian field hockey player

Personal information
- Nationality: Italian
- Born: 11 December 1934 (age 91) Civita Castellana, Italy

Sport
- Sport: Field hockey

Giovanni Mazzalupi (born 11 December 1934) is an Italian field hockey player. He competed in the men's tournament at the 1960 Summer Olympics.
