= Roland Zaninetti =

Swiss hockey player

Personal information
- Nationality: Swiss
- Born: 1 May 1936 (age 89) Lausanne, Switzerland

Sport
- Sport: Field hockey

Roland Zaninetti (born 1 May 1936) is a Swiss field hockey player. He competed in the men's tournament at the 1960 Summer Olympics.
