= Neil Livingstone (field hockey) =

British hockey player

Personal information
- Born: 4 June 1938
- Died: 14 July 2018 (aged 80)

Sport
- Sport: Field hockey
- Position: left-half back
Senior career
Years	Team	Caps	Goals
1960	University of Oxford	-	-
National team
Years	Team	Caps	Goals
1959–1960	Great Britain	10	-
–	Scotland		-

W. Neil Livingstone (4 June 1938 – 14 July 2018) was a British field hockey player who competed at the 1960 Summer Olympics.

== Biography ==
Livingstone played for Scotland at international level and while studying at Oxford University was the captain of the university hockey team. He went on to captain Scotland. Livingstone represented Great Britain in the field hockey tournament at the 1960 Olympic Games in Rome. He was the youngest member of the squad. Livingstone retired from hockey in 1964 to concentrate on his career as a surgeon.
