= Jean Giubbini =

Swiss hockey player

Personal information
- Nationality: Swiss
- Born: 19 November 1926 Milan, Italy
- Died: 1 March 1979 (aged 52) Lausanne, Switzerland

Sport
- Sport: Field hockey

Jean Giubbini (19 November 1926 – 1 March 1979) was a Swiss field hockey player. He competed in the men's tournament at the 1960 Summer Olympics.
