= Hiroyuki Fujiwara =

Japanese field hockey player

Personal information
- Nationality: Japanese
- Born: 1 January 1935 (age 91) Hokkaido, Japan

Sport
- Sport: Field hockey

Hiroyuki Fujiwara (born 1 January 1935) is a Japanese field hockey player. He competed in the men's tournament at the 1960 Summer Olympics.
