= Kunio Iwahashi =

Japanese hockey player

Personal information
- Nationality: Japanese
- Born: 3 January 1939 (age 87) Tokyo, Japan

Sport
- Sport: Field hockey

Kunio Iwahashi (岩橋 邦雄, Iwahashi Kunio; born 3 January 1939) is a Japanese field hockey player. He competed at the 1960 Summer Olympics and the 1964 Summer Olympics.
