= Teruo Yaguchi =

Japanese hockey player

Personal information
- Nationality: Japanese
- Born: 15 December 1935 (age 90) Kanagawa, Japan

Sport
- Sport: Field hockey

Teruo Yaguchi (born 15 December 1935) is a Japanese field hockey player. He competed in the men's tournament at the 1960 Summer Olympics.
