= Herbert Winters =

German field hockey player

Personal information
- Nationality: German
- Born: 6 June 1937 (age 89) Essen, Germany

Sport
- Sport: Field hockey

Herbert Winters (born 6 June 1937) is a German field hockey player. He competed in the men's tournament at the 1960 Summer Olympics.
