= Georges Mathys =

Swiss field hockey player

Personal information
- Nationality: Swiss
- Born: 1 May 1940 (age 85) Wrocław, Poland

Sport
- Sport: Field hockey

Georges Mathys (born 1 May 1940) is a Swiss field hockey player. He competed in the men's tournament at the 1960 Summer Olympics.
