= Carsten Bruun =

Danish field hockey player

Personal information
- Nationality: Danish
- Born: 28 September 1934 (age 92) Guldborgsund, Denmark

Sport
- Sport: Field hockey

Carsten Bruun (born 28 September 1934) is a Danish field hockey player. He competed in the men's tournament at the 1960 Summer Olympics.
