= Walther Wirz =

Swiss hockey player

Personal information
- Nationality: Swiss
- Born: 20 June 1936 (age 89) Olten, Switzerland

Sport
- Sport: Field hockey

Walther Wirz (born 20 June 1936) is a Swiss former field hockey player. He competed in the men's tournament at the 1960 Summer Olympics.
