= Klaus Woeller =

German hockey player

Personal information
- Nationality: German
- Born: 2 January 1934 (age 92) Frankfurt, Germany

Sport
- Sport: Field hockey

Klaus Woeller (born 2 January 1934) is a German field hockey player. He competed in the men's tournament at the 1960 Summer Olympics.
