= Wolfgang End =

German hockey player (1939–2008)

Personal information
- Nationality: German
- Born: 5 January 1939 Nuremberg, Germany
- Died: 7 October 2008 (aged 69) Munich, Germany

Sport
- Sport: Field hockey

Wolfgang End (5 January 1939 – 7 October 2008) was a German field hockey player. He competed in the men's tournament at the 1960 Summer Olympics.
