= Bob Scott (Australian footballer) =

Australian rules footballer

Personal information
- Full name: Robert Ainsley Scott
- Born: 27 October 1894; Clifton Hill, Victoria
- Died: 23 October 1990 (aged 95)
- Original team: Preston District
- Height: 180 cm (5 ft 11 in)
- Weight: 83 kg (183 lb)

Playing career^{1}
Years	Club	Games (Goals)
1919	Fitzroy	9 (0)
- ^{1} Playing statistics correct to the end of 1919.

Robert Ainsley Scott (27 October 1894 – 23 October 1990) was an Australian rules footballer who played with Fitzroy in the Victorian Football League (VFL).
