= Klaus Greinert =

German hockey player

Personal information
- Nationality: German
- Born: 3 June 1940 (age 86) Berlin, Germany

Sport
- Sport: Field hockey

Klaus Greinert (born 3 June 1940) is a German field hockey player. He competed at the 1960 Summer Olympics and the 1968 Summer Olympics.
