= Dieter Krause (field hockey) =

German field hockey player

Personal information
- Nationality: German
- Born: 17 December 1937 (age 88) Magdeburg, Germany

Sport
- Sport: Field hockey

Dieter Krause (born 17 December 1937) is a German field hockey player. He competed in the men's tournament at the 1960 Summer Olympics.
