= Jean-Pierre Marionex =

Belgian hockey player

Personal information
- Nationality: Belgian
- Born: 22 April 1937 Ixelles, Belgium
- Died: 6 April 2007 (aged 69)

Sport
- Sport: Field hockey

Jean-Pierre Marionex (22 April 1937 – 6 April 2007) was a Belgian field hockey player. He competed in the men's tournament at the 1960 Summer Olympics.
