= Willi Brendel =

German hockey player

Personal information
- Nationality: German
- Born: 6 August 1938 Kaiserslautern, Germany
- Died: 22 March 2006 (aged 67) Kaiserslautern, Germany

Sport
- Sport: Field hockey

Willi Brendel (6 August 1938 – 22 March 2006) was a German field hockey player. He competed in the men's tournament at the 1960 Summer Olympics.
