= Guy Huyghens =

Belgian field hockey player

Personal information
- Nationality: Belgian
- Born: 16 February 1933 (age 93) Ixelles, Belgium

Sport
- Sport: Field hockey

Guy Huyghens (born 16 February 1933) is a Belgian field hockey player. He competed in the men's tournament at the 1960 Summer Olympics.
