= Jim Collins (Australian footballer) =

Australian rules footballer

Personal information
- Full name: James Collins
- Born: 29 May 1896; Footscray, Victoria
- Died: 13 October 1990 (aged 94); Yarraville, Victoria
- Original team: Yarraville
- Height: 179 cm (5 ft 10 in)
- Weight: 80 kg (176 lb)

Playing career^{1}
Years	Club	Games (Goals)
1919–21	Essendon	30 (4)
- ^{1} Playing statistics correct to the end of 1921.

James "Jim" Collins (29 May 1896 – 13 October 1990) was an Australian rules footballer who played 30 games with Essendon in the Victorian Football League (VFL).
