= Elia Vannini =

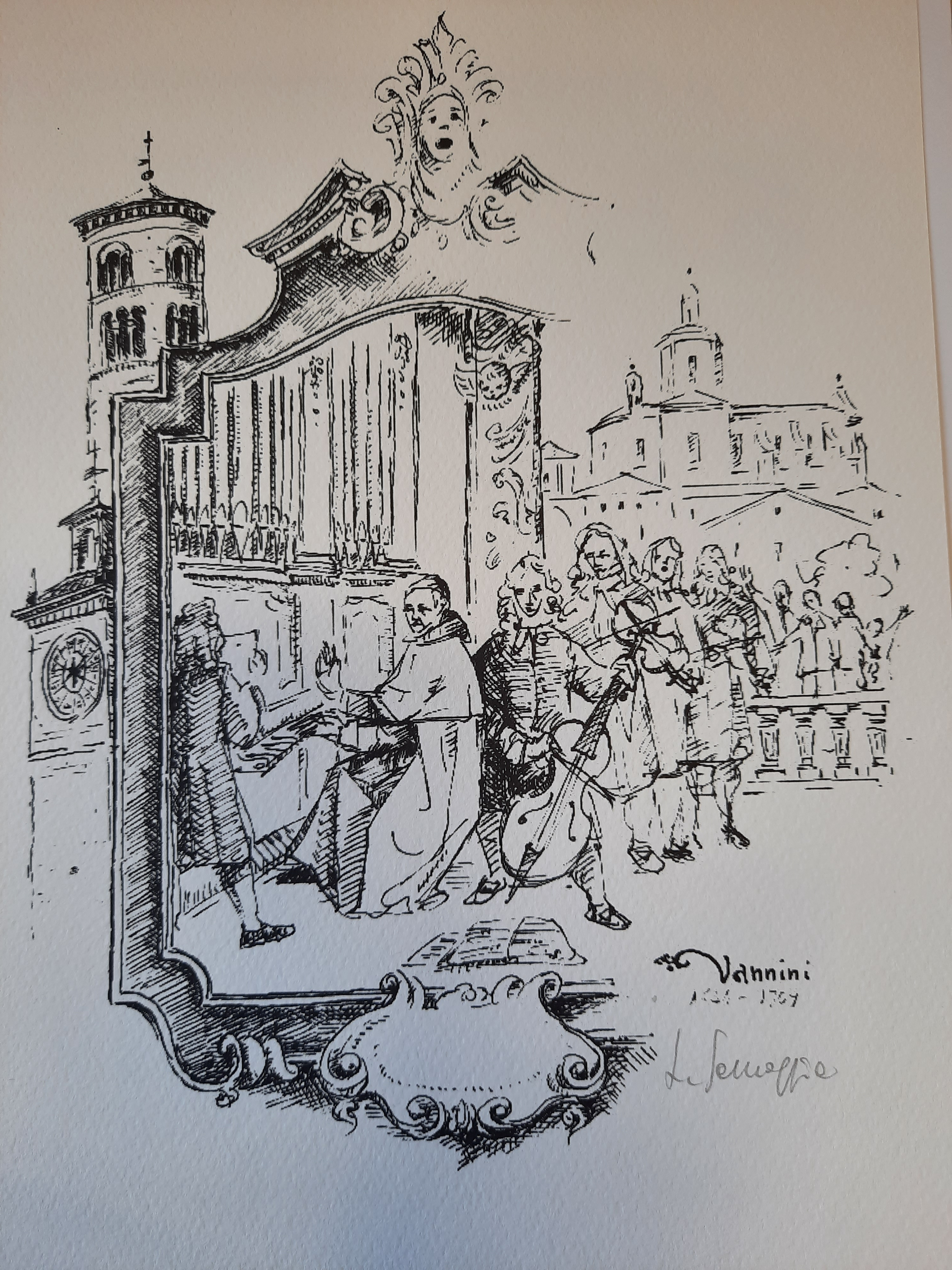

Elia Vannini (c. 1644 – 16 February 1709) was a Baroque composer and Carmelite friar. He was the maestro di cappella (kapellmeister) of the Cathedral of Ravenna from 1677 to 1701. While his works, including five published works, continued to be played for decades after his death, only since the 1970s has there been a renewed interest in his music. A primary school in Medicina, Italy, is named for him.

== Biography ==
Vannini was born in Medicina and baptized with the name of Giuseppe on 31 March. His parents were laborers for the Carmelite Monastery. In 1661, he entered the Carmelite monastery in Medicina where he also had music classes. He was a contemporary of Antonio Bononcini of Modena. In 1662, he took holy orders, and in 1667, he was ordained a priest.

One source claims Vannini was a Jew who converted to Catholicism.

In 1677 Vannini was named master of the chapel choir (maestro di cappella) for the Cathedral of Ravenna.
