= Gerard Overdijkink =

Dutch field hockey player

Personal information
- Nationality: Dutch
- Born: 14 March 1936 De Bilt, Netherlands
- Died: 6 November 2010 (aged 74) Bilthoven, Netherlands

Sport
- Sport: Field hockey

Gerard Overdijkink (14 March 1936 – 6 November 2010) was a Dutch field hockey player. He competed in the men's tournament at the 1960 Summer Olympics.
