= Heinz Wirz =

Swiss field hockey player

Personal information
- Nationality: Swiss
- Born: 5 February 1939 (age 87) Olten, Switzerland

Sport
- Sport: Field hockey

Heinz Wirz (born 5 February 1939) is a Swiss former field hockey player. He competed in the men's tournament at the 1960 Summer Olympics.
