= René Wiedmer =

Swiss field hockey player (1936–2013)

Personal information
- Nationality: Swiss
- Born: 18 November 1936 Olten, Switzerland
- Died: 12 April 2013 (aged 76)

Sport
- Sport: Field hockey

René Wiedmer (18 November 1936 – 12 April 2013) was a Swiss field hockey player. He competed in the men's tournament at the 1960 Summer Olympics.
