= Giovanni Anni =

Italian field hockey player (born 1936)

Personal information
- Nationality: Italian
- Born: 8 May 1936 (age 90) Cagliari, Italy

Sport
- Sport: Field hockey

Giovanni Anni (born 8 May 1936) is an Italian field hockey player. He competed in the men's tournament at the 1960 Summer Olympics.
