= Jack Doherty (footballer, born 1915) =

Australian rules footballer (1915–1990)

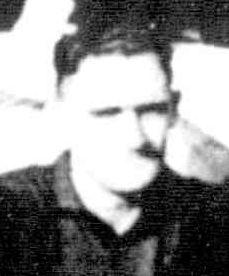

Personal information
- Born: 5 August 1915
- Died: 22 October 1990 (aged 75)
- Original team: South Adelaide
- Height: 5' 9
- Weight: 291
- Position: Midfielder

Playing career^{1}
Years	Club	Games (Goals)
1943–44	Melbourne	9 (1)
- ^{1} Playing statistics correct to the end of 1944.

Jack Doherty (5 August 1915 – 22 October 1990) was an Australian rules footballer who played with Melbourne in the Victorian Football League (VFL).
