= Ivan Porter =

Australian rules footballer, born 1918

Personal information
- Full name: Ivan Rowland Porter
- Born: 8 September 1918; Armadale, Victoria
- Died: 31 October 1990 (aged 72)
- Original team: Prahran

Playing career^{1}
| Years | Club | Games (Goals) |
| 1938–39 | Prahran (VFA) | 20 (39) |
| 1944–46 | Melbourne | 25 (31) |
- ^{1} Playing statistics correct to the end of 1946.

Ivan Rowland Porter (8 September 1918 – 31 October 1990) was an Australian rules footballer who played with Melbourne in the Victorian Football League (VFL).

Porter's football career was interrupted by his service in the Australian Army during World War II.
