= Walther Arber =

Swiss hockey player

Personal information
- Nationality: Swiss
- Born: 3 August 1923 Mannheim, Germany

Sport
- Sport: Field hockey

Walther Arber (born 3 August 1923) was a Swiss field hockey player. He competed in the men's tournament at the 1960 Summer Olympics.
