= Werner Schmid (field hockey) =

Swiss hockey player

Personal information
- Nationality: Swiss
- Born: 18 May 1933 (age 93) Aargau, Switzerland

Sport
- Sport: Field hockey

Werner Schmid (born 18 May 1933) is a Swiss former field hockey player. He competed in the men's tournament at the 1960 Summer Olympics.
