= Patrick Buteux van der Kamp =

Dutch hockey player

Personal information
- Nationality: Dutch
- Born: 9 October 1937 (age 88) The Hague, Netherlands

Sport
- Sport: Field hockey

Patrick Buteux van der Kamp (born 9 October 1937) is a Dutch former field hockey player. He competed in the men's tournament at the 1960 Summer Olympics.
