= Ichiro Sado =

Japanese field hockey player

Personal information
- Nationality: Japanese
- Born: 5 February 1941 (age 85) Kyoto, Japan

Sport
- Sport: Field hockey

Ichiro Sado (born 5 February 1941) is a Japanese field hockey player. He competed in the men's tournament at the 1960 Summer Olympics.
