= Walter Hammersen =

German politician (1911–1990)

Member of the Bundestag
- In office 17 October 1961 – 17 October 1965

Personal details
- Born: 5 January 1911 Osnabrück
- Died: 10 October 1990 (aged 79)
- Party: FDP

Walter Hammersen (5 January 1911 – 10 October 1990) was a German politician of the Free Democratic Party (FDP) and former member of the German Bundestag.

== Life ==
Hammersen was a member of the Wiesbaden city council from 1954 to 1966. He was a member of the German Bundestag from 1961 to 1965. He had entered parliament via the state list of the FDP Hessen.

== Literature ==
Herbst, Ludolf; Jahn, Bruno (2002). Vierhaus, Rudolf (ed.). Biographisches Handbuch der Mitglieder des Deutschen Bundestages. 1949–2002 [Biographical Handbook of the Members of the German Bundestag. 1949–2002] (in German). München: De Gruyter - De Gruyter Saur. p. 1715. ISBN 978-3-11-184511-1.
