= Christian Büchting =

German field hockey player

Personal information
- Nationality: German
- Born: 23 January 1937 (age 89) Wernigerode, Germany

Sport
- Sport: Field hockey

Christian Büchting (born 23 January 1937) is a German former field hockey player. He competed in the men's tournament at the 1960 Summer Olympics.
