= Kurt Locher =

Swiss hockey player

Personal information
- Nationality: Swiss
- Born: 30 December 1938 (age 87) St. Gallen, Switzerland

Sport
- Sport: Field hockey

Kurt Locher (born 30 December 1938) is a Swiss former field hockey player. He competed in the men's tournament at the 1960 Summer Olympics.
