= Barry Malcolm =

Australian field hockey player

Personal information
- Nationality: Australian
- Born: 1 January 1936 (age 90) Townsville, Australia

Sport
- Sport: Field hockey

Barry Malcolm (born 1 January 1936) is an Australian field hockey player. He competed in the men's tournament at the 1960 Summer Olympics.
