= Yoshio Kojima (field hockey) =

Japanese hockey player

Personal information
- Nationality: Japanese
- Born: 3 October 1935 (age 91) Kanagawa, Japan

Sport
- Sport: Field hockey

Yoshio Kojima (born 3 October 1935) is a Japanese field hockey player. He competed in the men's tournament at the 1960 Summer Olympics.
