= Surjeet Singh Panesar =

Kenyan field hockey player (1938–2019)

Personal information
- Born: 24 June 1938 Nairobi, British Kenya
- Died: 6 November 2019 (aged 81) Nairobi, Kenya

Sport
- Sport: Field hockey
Senior career
Years	Team	Caps	Goals
1957–1980	Sikh Union	-	-
National team
Years	Team	Caps	Goals
1959–1972	Kenya	165	-

Surjeet Singh Panesar (24 June 1938 – 6 November 2019) was a Kenyan field hockey player. He represented Kenya in 165 international matches, and competed at the 1960, 1964, 1968 and the 1972 Summer Olympics. He played at either the centre-half or full-back position.

Born on 24 June 1938 in Nairobi to Indian immigrant parents, he attended The Duke of Gloucester School. In 1954, he went to India in order to pursue higher education. At university, he studied architecture, and was a part of the hockey team. Upon his return to Kenya in 1957, he started playing for the Sikh Union hockey club. He played his first international game in 1959, representing Kenya against Rhodesia, scoring a goal in his debut match.

In 1960, owing to his performance in a three-test series against Pakistan, he was included in the Kenyan side for the 1960 field hockey tournament at the Olympics, where Kenya finished 7th. Becoming a regular in the national side, Panesar also competed at the 1964 and 1968 Olympics. Panesar also competed in the 1971 World Cup, where the Kenyan side finished fourth.

Panesar played his last international in the 1972 Summer Olympics against Argentina, which was his 31st Olympic match. He continued to play at the club level, for the Sikh Union, captaining the team between 1975 and 1977. In 1980, he retired from hockey. However, the continued to be involved with the Sikh Union management. Following a period of illness, Panesar died on 6 November 2019 in Nairobi. He was married to Kuldip Kaur, and the couple had two sons.
