= Albert Piaget =

Swiss field hockey player (1928–2009)

Personal information
- Full name: Albert Arthur Piaget
- Nationality: Swiss
- Born: 13 April 1928 Neuchâtel, Switzerland
- Died: October 2009 (aged 81)

Sport
- Sport: Field hockey

Albert Arthur Piaget (13 April 1928 – October 2009) was a Swiss field hockey player. He competed in the men's tournament at the 1960 Summer Olympics. Piaget died in October 2009, at the age of 81.
