= Robert Lycke =

Belgian hockey player

Personal information
- Nationality: Belgian
- Born: 7 June 1937 (age 88) Brussels, Belgium

Sport
- Sport: Field hockey

Robert Lycke (born 7 June 1937) is a Belgian field hockey player. He competed in the men's tournament at the 1960 Summer Olympics.
