= Freddie Hooghiemstra =

Dutch businessman and hockey player

Personal information
- Nationality: Dutch
- Born: 7 August 1931 De Bilt, Netherlands
- Died: 21 October 1990 (aged 59) Rijswijk, Netherlands

Sport
- Sport: Field hockey

Freddie Hooghiemstra, born George Alfred Hooghiemstra (7 August 1931 – 21 October 1990), was a Dutch businessman and field hockey player. He introduced new types of coffee machines to the Dutch market, and competed in the men's tournament at the 1960 Summer Olympics.

== Biography ==
Born in 1931 in Bilthoven, Hooghiemstra became captain of the Dutch national hockey champions SCHC in 1959. In the same year he introduced an American-origin powdered coffee machine to the Dutch market and enjoyed significant business success. The year after he competed on the Dutch hockey team at the Olympics in Rome, with the team placing 9th in the competition. By 1969 Hooghiemstra had developed a filter-coffee machine for which he was granted a Canadian patent, and used the proceeds earned from sales of this machine to fund his 1985 purchase of the abandoned natural swimming baths at De Biltse Duinen with the idea of converting them in to a golf course. However, expansion of this site was strongly opposed by local residents and the issue was only finally resolved following an appeal to the Dutch Supreme Court, in favour of the opponents of expansion of the site.

Hooghiemstra died in 1990 of a heart attack, whilst playing golf at Rijswijk. In 2021 he was commemorated with an assembly of former Dutch international hockey players at his golf course at De Biltse Duinen.
