= Eddie Zwier =

Dutch field hockey player

Personal information
- Nationality: Dutch
- Born: 30 July 1934 (age 91) Voorburg, Netherlands

Sport
- Sport: Field hockey

Eddie Zwier (born 30 July 1934) is a Dutch field hockey player. He competed in the men's tournament at the 1960 Summer Olympics.
