= Saude George =

Kenyan hockey player

Personal information
- Full name: Saude André N. George
- Nationality: Kenyan
- Born: 30 November 1931 Nairobi, British Kenya
- Died: 27 May 2010 (aged 78) Nairobi, Kenya

Sport
- Sport: Field hockey

Saude George (30 November 1931 – 27 May 2010) was a Kenyan field hockey player. He competed at the 1960 Summer Olympics and the 1964 Summer Olympics.
