= Surjeet Singh Deol =

Kenyan hockey player

Personal information
- Nationality: Kenyan
- Born: 9 August 1924 Nairobi, British Kenya
- Died: 8 June 1984 (aged 59) Jagraon, India

Sport
- Sport: Field hockey
- Club: Simba Union, Nairobi

Surjeet Singh Deol (9 August 1924 – 8 June 1984) was a Kenyan field hockey player. He competed at the 1956 Summer Olympics and the 1960 Summer Olympics. He is the father of Canadian hockey international Ranjeev Deol.
