= Erik Frandsen (field hockey) =

Danish field hockey player

Personal information
- Nationality: Danish
- Born: 12 November 1923 Copenhagen, Denmark
- Died: 19 June 1974 (aged 50) Gladsaxe, Denmark

Sport
- Sport: Field hockey

Erik Frandsen (12 November 1923 – 19 June 1974) was a Danish field hockey player. He competed in the men's tournament at the 1960 Summer Olympics.
