= Hilary Fernandes =

Kenyan field hockey player

Personal information
- Full name: Hilary John Fernandes
- Nationality: Kenyan
- Born: 22 October 1937 (age 88) Nairobi, British Kenya

Sport
- Sport: Field hockey

Hilary John Fernandes (born 22 October 1937) is a Kenyan field hockey player. He competed at the 1960, 1964 and the 1968 Summer Olympics. He is the brother of Kenyan hockey international Leo Fernandes.
