= Quarto Pianesi =

Italian field hockey player (1940–2022)

Personal information
- Nationality: Italian
- Born: 18 May 1940 Macerata, Italy
- Died: 15 January 2022 (aged 81) San Donato Milanese, Milan, Italy

Sport
- Sport: Field hockey

Quarto Pianesi (18 May 1940 – 15 January 2022) was an Italian field hockey player. He competed in the men's tournament at the 1960 Summer Olympics.

Pianesi died from COVID-19 in San Donato Milanese, Milan, on 15 January 2022, at the age of 81.
