= Alessandro Vannini =

Italian field hockey player (born 1938)

Personal information
- Nationality: Italian
- Born: 10 October 1938 (age 88) Bologna, Italy

Sport
- Sport: Field hockey

Alessandro Vannini (born 10 October 1938) is an Italian field hockey player. He competed in the men's tournament at the 1960 Summer Olympics.
