= Pritam Singh Sandhu =

Kenyan hockey player

Personal information
- Nationality: Kenyan
- Born: 21 December 1931 Mwanza, British Tanganyika
- Died: 19 March 1999 (aged 67) Nairobi, Kenya

Sport
- Sport: Field hockey
- Club: Simba Union, Nairobi

Pritam Singh Sandhu (21 December 1931 – 19 March 1999) was a Kenyan field hockey player. He competed at the 1960 Summer Olympics. He later served as an official for the Kenya hockey team at the 1984 Los Angeles Olympics.
