= John Simonian =

Kenyan field hockey player (1935–2019)

Personal information
- Nationality: Kenyan
- Born: 15 December 1935 Wad Madani, Anglo-Egyptian Sudan
- Died: 23 December 2019 (aged 84) Sydney, Australia

Sport
- Sport: Field hockey, car rallying, motorcycle racing

John Simonian (15 December 1935 – 23 December 2019) was a Kenyan field hockey player. He competed at the 1960, 1964 and the 1968 Summer Olympics.
