= Hans Straub (field hockey) =

Swiss field hockey player

Personal information
- Nationality: Swiss
- Born: 7 November 1932 (age 93) Moutier, Switzerland

Sport
- Sport: Field hockey

Hans Straub (born 7 November 1932) is a Swiss former field hockey player. He competed in the men's tournament at the 1960 Summer Olympics.
