= Kirpal Singh Bhardwaj =

Kenyan hockey player

Personal information
- Nationality: Kenyan
- Born: 9 September 1935 Tororo, British Uganda
- Died: 10 November 2013 (aged 78) Harrow, London, England

Sport
- Sport: Field hockey
- Club: Simba Union, Nairobi

Kirpal Singh Bhardwaj (9 September 1935 – 10 November 2013) was a Kenyan field hockey player. He competed at the 1960 Summer Olympics and the 1968 Summer Olympics.
