= Jean Glarner =

Swiss hockey player

Personal information
- Nationality: Swiss
- Born: 20 January 1940 (age 86) Geneva, Switzerland

Sport
- Sport: Field hockey

Jean Glarner (born 20 January 1940) is a Swiss field hockey player. He competed in the men's tournament at the 1960 Summer Olympics.
