= Silvester Fernandes =

Kenyan hockey player

Personal information
- Nationality: Kenyan
- Born: 26 November 1936 (age 89) Nairobi, British Kenya

Sport
- Sport: Field hockey

Silvester Fernandes (born 26 November 1936) is a Kenyan field hockey player. He competed at the 1960, 1964 and the 1968 Summer Olympics.
