= Bent Kilde =

Danish field hockey player

Personal information
- Nationality: Danish
- Born: 12 April 1938 (age 88) Odense, Denmark

Sport
- Sport: Field hockey

Bent Kilde (born 12 April 1938) is a Danish field hockey player. He competed in the men's tournament at the 1960 Summer Olympics.
