= Giampaolo Farci =

Italian field hockey player (born 1937)

Personal information
- Nationality: Italian
- Born: 30 June 1937 Cagliari, Italy
- Died: 24 January 2023 (aged 85)

Sport
- Sport: Field hockey

Giampaolo Farci (30 June 1937 – 24 January 2023) was an Italian field hockey player. He competed in the men's tournament at the 1960 Summer Olympics.
