= Avtar Singh Sohal =

Kenyan field hockey player

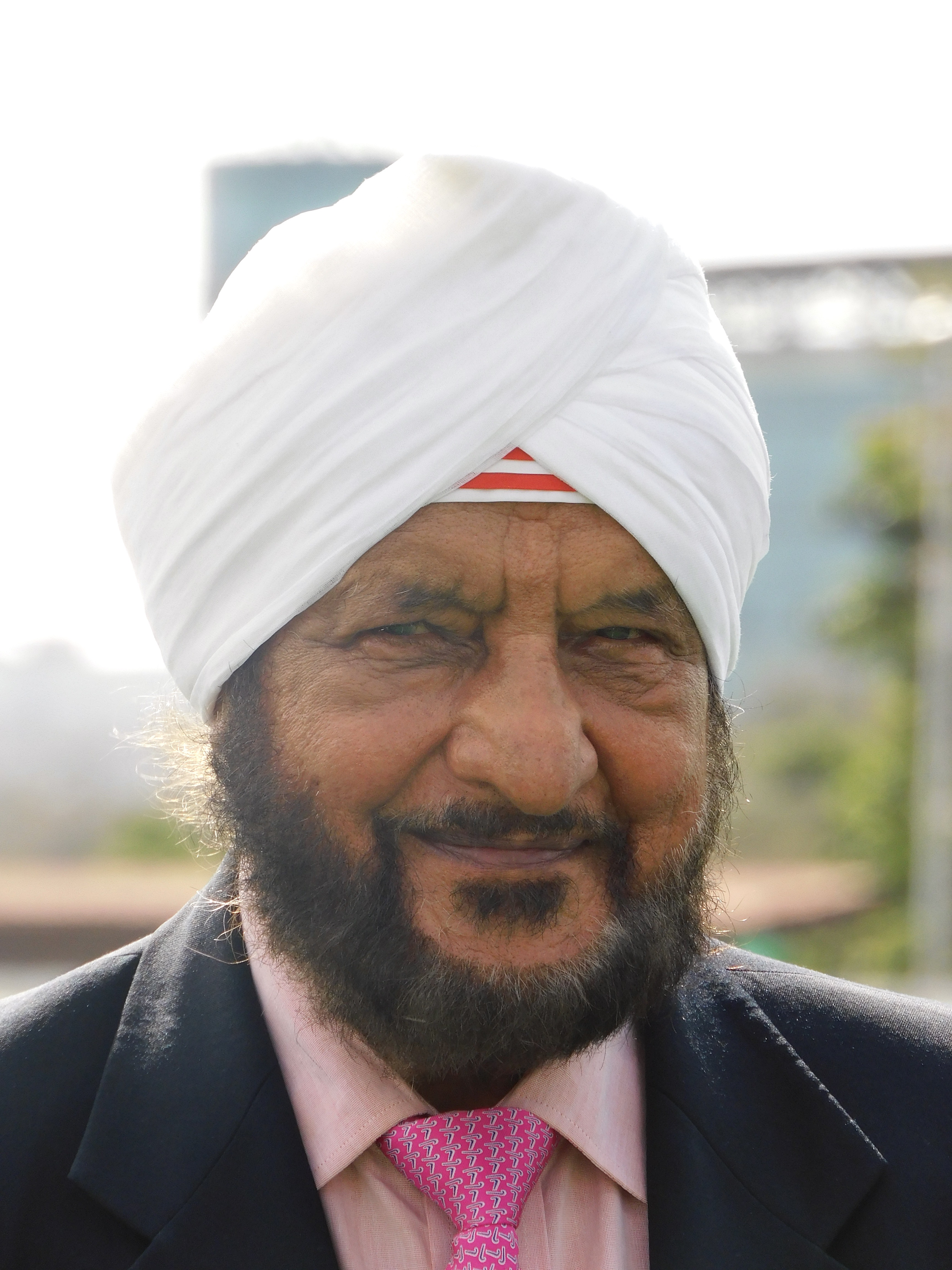
- Avtar Singh at Simba Union, Kenya, in 2022

Personal information
- Born: 22 March 1938 (age 88) Nairobi, British Kenya

Sport
- Sport: Field hockey
- Club: Simba Union, Nairobi

Avtar Singh Sohal "Tari" (born 22 March 1938) is a Kenyan field hockey player. He represented Kenya in 167 international matches, and competed at the 1960, 1964, 1968 and the 1972 Summer Olympics.

Born on 22 March 1938 in Nairobi to Indian immigrant parents, he attended the City Primary School and The Duke of Gloucester School. At school, he was a cricket player. Upon watching Dhyan Chand play for an Indian side touring Kenya in 1948, he developed an interest in field hockey. He played for the Sikh Union hockey club, and made his international debut against South Africa in 1957. He went on to represent the national side at the field hockey tournament in the 1960 Olympics, as a full-back.

In 1962, he was appointed as the captain for the national side. He went on to captain Kenya at the 1964, 1968, and 1972 Olympics, as well as the 1971 World Cup, where they finished fourth. Sohal retired from international hockey following the 1972 Olympics. He featured in the 1979 Guinness Book of Records for having the most international field hockey caps, with his record of 167 caps being broken in 1985.

Between 1978 and 1988, he was a coach for the Kenyan national team, coaching them at the 1984 Olympics. Subsequently, he went on to work as an umpire with the International Hockey Federation, serving as a judge at the 1988 Olympics. He also had stints as a coach for the Hong Kong, Indonesia and Zimbabwe teams. In 2013, he joined the Friends School Kamusinga as a coach. In 2022, he was awarded the Order of the Grand Warrior. Sohal is a devout Sikh.
