= Krishnan Kumar Aggarwal =

Kenyan field hockey player (born 1939)

Personal information
- Nationality: Kenyan
- Born: 25 January 1939 (age 87)
- Height: 1.67 m (5 ft 6 in)
- Weight: 55 kg (121 lb)

Sport
- Sport: Field hockey

Krishnan Kumar Aggarwal (born 25 January 1939) is a Kenyan field hockey player. He competed in the 1960 and 1964 Summer Olympics.
