= Chris Saunders-Griffiths =

British field hockey player

John Saunders-Griffiths
Personal information
- Born: 10 January 1929 Chester, England
- Died: 12 July 2001 (aged 72)

Sport
- Sport: Field hockey
Senior career
Years	Team	Caps	Goals
1956–1965	Deeside Ramblers	-	-
National team
Years	Team	Caps	Goals
–	Great Britain		-
–	Wales	31	-

Christopher John Douglas Saunders-Griffiths (10 January 1929 – 12 July 2001) was a British field hockey player who competed at the 1960 Summer Olympics.

== Biography ==
Family members say that he was known as C.J.D Saunders-Griffiths and was always called John.

Saunders-Griffiths was at educated Ruthin School in Denbighshire and studied at St Edmund Hall, Oxford.

He played club hockey for Deeside Ramblers Hockey Club and later captained the club and earned 31 caps for Wales. He was also the captain of Cheshire at county level for whom he appeared 52 times.

He represented Great Britain in the field hockey tournament at the 1960 Olympic Games in Rome.
