= Emanuel Sweert =

Dutch painter and nurseryman (1552–1612)

Emanuel Sweerts
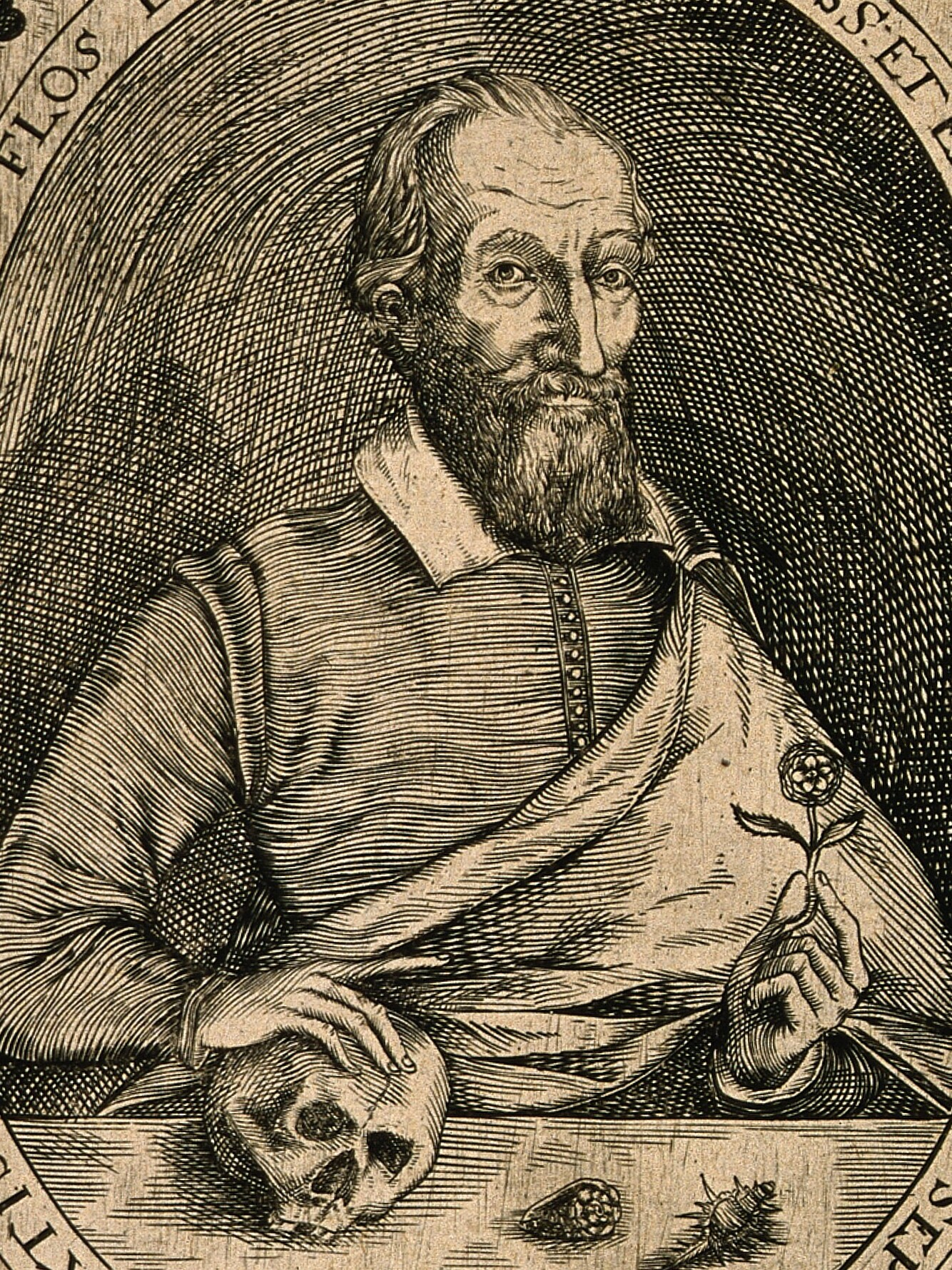
- Emanuel Sweerts (1612)
- Born: 1552; Zevenbergen, Netherlands
- Died: 1612 (aged 59–60); Amsterdam, Netherlands
- Occupation(s): Painter, Nurseryman
- Employer: Emperor Rudolf II
- Known for: Publication of Florilegium Amplissimum et Selectissimum
- Notable work: Florilegium Amplissimum et Selectissimum

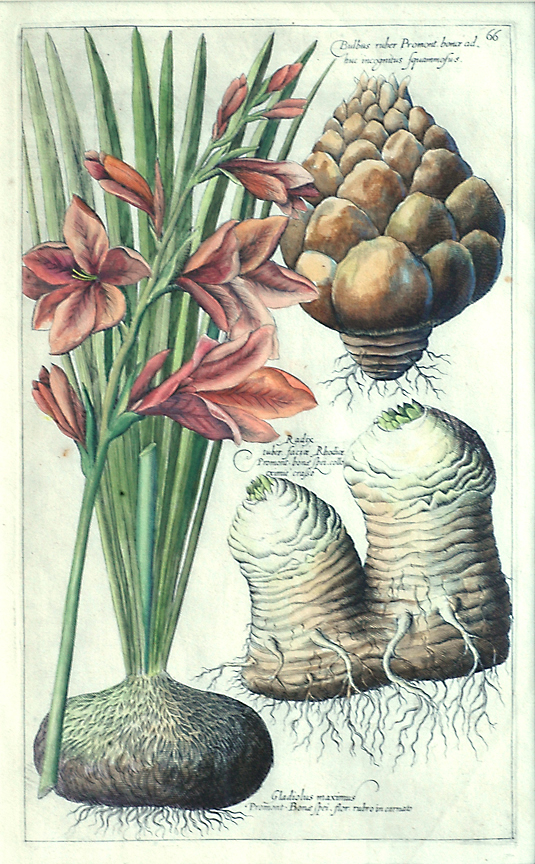
Plate 66 from Florilegium

Emanuel Sweerts (1552–1612) was a Dutch painter and nurseryman noted for his publication in 1612 at Frankfurt-am-Main of Florilegium Amplissimum et Selectissimum.

Sweerts was born at Zevenbergen and lived in a period when new plants from across the world were being introduced to Europe via Dutch, English and French ships. To meet the burgeoning interest in plants by the public, nurseries were being established by wealthy merchants in order to meet the demand. Botanical illustration suddenly found a new outlet in the production of nursery catalogues. Sweerts prepared his Florilegium as a guide of his available stock for the Frankfurt Fair of 1612. The plates, depicting some 560 bulbs and flowers, were from the Johann Theodore de Bry Florilegium which in turn was based on that by Pierre Vallet. His attractively depicted bulbs sparked their popularity, leading to 6 editions of the work between 1612 and 1647, and a demand which would later result in "Tulipomania". At the time of the fair Sweerts was in the employ of Emperor Rudolf II as head of his gardens in Vienna. He borrowed freely from plates that had been published before, so that many of those that appeared in the Florilegium had been cultivated in the gardens of King Henry IV of France at the Louvre. He died in Amsterdam.

== See also ==
- List of florilegia and botanical codices
