= Field hockey at the 1960 Summer Olympics =

Field hockey at the Games of the XVII Olympiad
- Venues: Olympic Velodrome; Stadio dei Marmi; Stadio Tre Fontane
- Dates: 26 August – 11 September 1960
- Teams: 16

Medalists
1st place, gold medalist(s)		Pakistan
2nd place, silver medalist(s)		India
3rd place, bronze medalist(s)		Spain

The field hockey tournament at the 1960 Summer Olympics in Rome, Italy was contested from August 26 to September 9, with sixteen participating teams. Only men competed in field hockey at these Games. Pakistan won the gold medal, defeating India in the final and ending India's run of six successive Olympic gold medals in field hockey. Spain won the bronze medal.

== Participating nations ==
Sixteen teams were placed into four preliminary groups of four teams each. After a preliminary round-robin set of matches, the top two teams in each group advanced to the quarter-finals.

Group A

- Denmark
- India
- Netherlands
- New Zealand

Group B

- Australia
- Japan
- Pakistan
- Poland

Group C

- France
- United Team of Germany
- Italy
- Kenya

Group D

- Belgium
- Great Britain
- Spain
- Switzerland

== Preliminary round ==
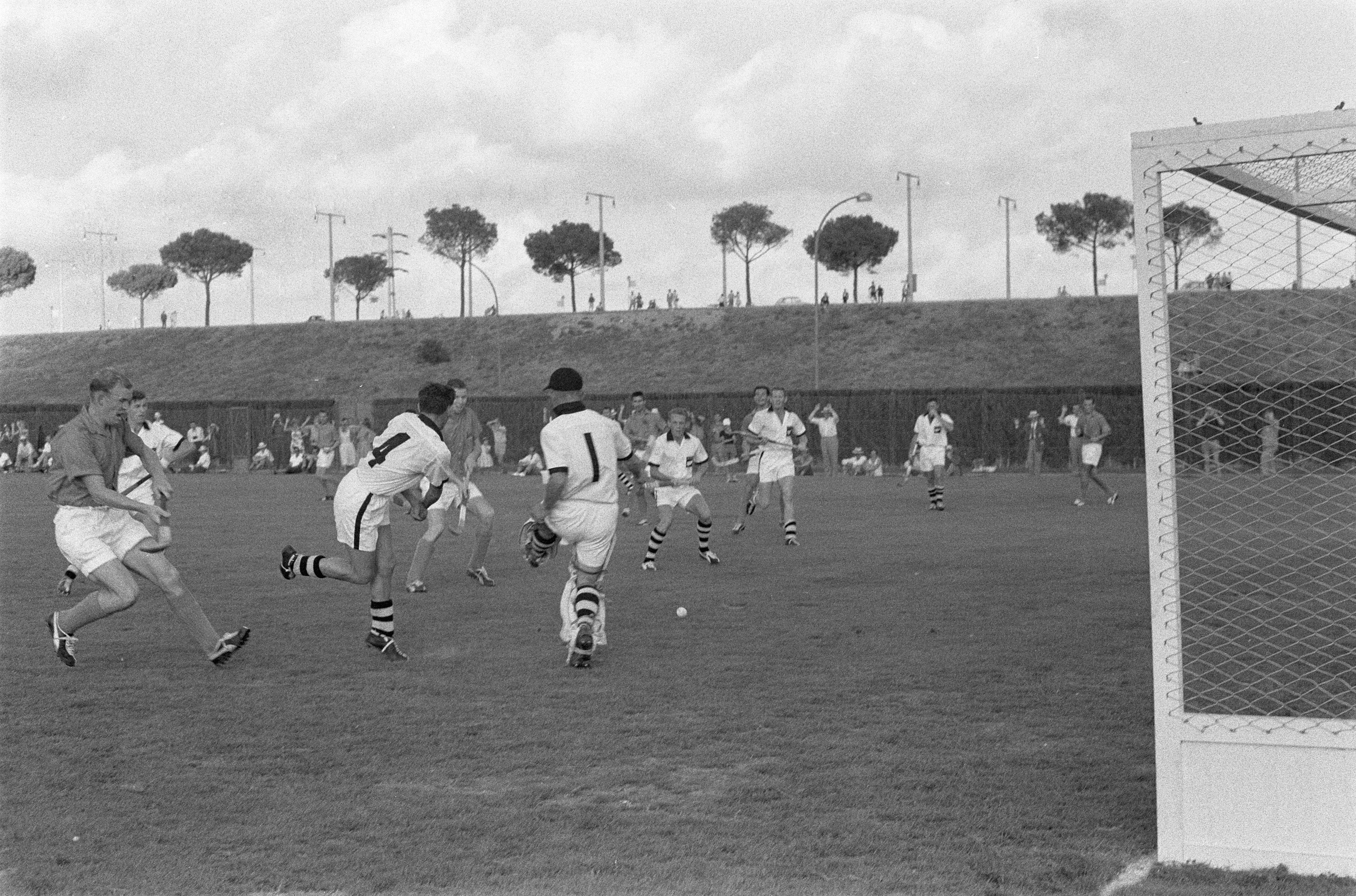
Match between the Netherlands and New Zealand

=== Group A ===
Pos	Team	Pld	W	D	L	GF	GA	GD	Pts	Qualification
1	India	3	3	0	0	17	1	+16	6	Quarter-finals
2	New Zealand (Note: New Zealand and the Netherlands finished on equal points at the conclusion of the pool stage, resulting in a match to determine second place in the pool, which New Zealand won 2–1.)	3	1	1	1	5	5	0	3	Quarter-finals
3	Netherlands	3	1	1	1	6	7	−1	3	9–12th place classification
4	Denmark	3	0	0	3	3	18	−15	0	13–16th place classification

Source: FIH
Notes:

27 August 1960
15:00

India	10–0	Denmark
P. Singh 1', 15', 16'; Bhola 22', 31', 67'; Peter 41'; Ja. Singh 64' ? ?

Stadio dei Marmi, Rome
Umpires:
McIldowie (RSA)
Whitelaw (GBR)

27 August 1960
16:30

New Zealand	1–1	Netherlands
Hobson 25'		Van Erven Dorens 23'

Stadio dei Marmi, Rome
Umpires:
Franck (BEL)
Massart (BEL)

30 August 1960
16:30

India	4–1	Netherlands
Ja. Singh 26'; Bhola 63'; P. Singh 66', 69'		Van Vroonhoven 9'

Stadio dei Marmi, Rome
Umpires:
de Bourguignon (BEL)
Asselman (BEL)

31 August 1960
16:30

New Zealand	4–1	Denmark
Hobson 4'; Turner 24', 41'; Bygrave 35'		Christiansen 16'

Olympic Velodrome, Rome
Umpires:
McDowell (AUS)
Glichitch (FRA)

2 September 1960
16:30

India	3–0	New Zealand
Bhola 8'; Peter 57'; Ja. Singh 70'

Olympic Velodrome, Rome
Umpires:
McIldowie (RSA)
Whitelaw (GBR)

3 September 1960
10:00

Netherlands	4–2	Denmark
Van Erven Dorens 37', 49', 64'; P. Nielsen 70'		Guldbrandsen 30'; Kristoffersen 68'

Olympic Velodrome, Rome
Umpires:
Harasta (AUT)
Bernet (SUI)

==== Second place play-off ====
4 September 1960
15:30

New Zealand	2–1	Netherlands
Bygrave 31', 58'		De Beer 14'

Campo Tre Fontane, Rome
Umpires:
Schinner (GER)
Lichtenfeld (GER)

New Zealand advanced to the quarter-finals. The Netherlands continued to the classification matches for 9th–12th place.

=== Group B ===
Pos	Team	Pld	W	D	L	GF	GA	GD	Pts	Qualification
1	Pakistan	3	3	0	0	21	0	+21	6	Quarter-finals
2	Australia (Note: Australia and Poland finished on equal points at the conclusion of the pool stage, resulting in a match to determine second place in the pool, which Australia won 2–0.)	3	1	1	1	9	5	+4	3	Quarter-finals
3	Poland	3	1	1	1	3	10	−7	3	9–12th place classification
4	Japan	3	0	0	3	2	20	−18	0	13–16th place classification

Source: FIH
Notes:

26 August 1960
10:00

Pakistan	3–0	Australia
H. Abdul 48'; Noor 53'; Mushtaq 56'

Stadio dei Marmi, Rome
Umpires:
Van Ballgoijen de Jong (NED)
Elgershuizen (NED)

26 August 1960
15:00

Poland	2–1	Japan
Flinik 33'; Wiśniewski 56'		Iijima 68'

Stadio dei Marmi, Rome
Umpires:
Lichtenfeld (GER)
Schinner (GER)

29 August 1960
16:30

Pakistan	8–0	Poland
H. Abdul 6', 24', 55'; Noor 18'; Mutti 22'; W. Abdul 45', 69'; Nasir 60'

Stadio dei Marmi, Rome
Umpires:
Whitelaw (GBR)
McIldowie (RSA)

30 August 1960
10:00

Australia	8–1	Japan
Crossman 1', 25'; E. Pearce 13', 27', 31', 37', 65'; Evans 33'		Kanbe 20'

Stadio dei Marmi, Rome
Umpires:
Massart (BEL)
Franck (BEL)

1 September 1960
10:00

Pakistan	10–0	Japan
W. Abdul 21', 30'; H. Abdul 24', 37', 50', 51'; Nasir 33', 45', 60'; Khan 59'

Olympic Velodrome, Rome
Umpires:
H. Singh (IND)
Burgess (GBR)

1 September 1960
16:30

Australia	1–1	Poland
Crossman 62'		Kubiak 48'

Olympic Velodrome, Rome
Umpires:
Asselman (BEL)
de Bourguignon (BEL)

==== Second place play-off ====
3 September 1960
08:30

Australia	2–0	Poland
Crossman 55'; Currie 66'

Campo Tre Fontane, Rome
Umpires:
McIldowie (RSA), Whitelaw (GBR)

Australia advanced to the quarter-finals. Poland continued to the classification matches for 9th–12th place.

=== Group C ===
Pos	Team	Pld	W	D	L	GF	GA	GD	Pts	Qualification
1	Kenya	3	2	1	0	8	0	+8	5	Quarter-finals
2	United Team of Germany	3	2	0	1	10	1	+9	4	Quarter-finals
3	France	3	1	1	1	2	5	−3	3	9–12th place classification
4	Italy (H)	3	0	0	3	0	14	−14	0	13–16th place classification

Source: FIH
(H) Hosts

29 August 1960
10:00

Kenya	1–0	United Team of Germany
H. Fernandes 45'

Stadio dei Marmi, Rome
Umpires:
Burgess (GBR)
H. Singh (IND)

29 August 1960
15:00

France	2–0	Italy
Reynaud 21'; J-P Windal 54'

Stadio dei Marmi, Rome
Umpires:
Bernet (SUI)
Harasta (AUT)

31 August 1960
10:00

United Team of Germany	5–0	France
Keller 23', 52', 61', 66'; Schuler 31'

Olympic Velodrome, Rome
Umpires:
Ghosh (IND)
G. Singh (IND)

1 September 1960
15:00

Kenya	7–0	Italy
E. Fernandes 14'; H. Fernandes 17', 64', 65'; Sohal 24', 48'; Pianesi 42'

Olympic Velodrome, Rome
Umpires:
Bernet (SUI)
Harasta (AUT)

3 September 1960
15:00

United Team of Germany	5–0	Italy
Keller 24', 43', 45'; Budinger 29', 41'

Olympic Velodrome, Rome
Umpires:
de Bourguignon (BEL)
Asselman (BEL)

3 September 1960
16:30

Kenya	0–0	France

Olympic Velodrome, Rome
Umpires:
H. Singh (IND)
Burgess (GBR)

=== Group D ===
Pos	Team	Pld	W	D	L	GF	GA	GD	Pts	Qualification
1	Spain	3	2	1	0	8	2	+6	5	Quarter-finals
2	Great Britain	3	1	2	0	4	1	+3	4	Quarter-finals
3	Belgium	3	1	1	1	6	6	0	3	9–12th place classification
4	Switzerland	3	0	0	3	3	12	−9	0	13–16th place classification

Source: FIH

26 August 1960
16:30

Spain	0–0	Great Britain

Stadio dei Marmi, Rome
Umpires:
G. Singh (IND)
Ghosh (IND)

27 August 1960
10:00

Belgium	4–2	Switzerland
Remy 24'; M. Muschs 45'; Dubois 55', 65'		Von Arx 30'; Zanetti 59'

Stadio dei Marmi, Rome
Umpires:
MacDowell (AUS)
Glichitch (FRA)

30 August 1960
15:00

Belgium	1–1	Great Britain
Debbaudt 69'		Hindle 12'

Stadio dei Marmi, Rome
Umpires:
Elgershuizen (NED)
Van Ballgoijen de Jong (NED)

31 August 1960
15:00

Spain	5–1	Switzerland
Murua 5'; Macaya 22'; E. Dualde 25', 66'; Usoz 31'		Zanetti 11'

Olympic Velodrome, Rome
Umpires:
Lichtenfeld (GER)
Schinner (GER)

2 September 1960
10:00

Great Britain	3–0	Switzerland
Mayes 5', 63'; Scott 68'

Olympic Velodrome, Rome
Umpires:
Glichitch (FRA)
MacDowell (AUS)

2 September 1960
15:00

Spain	3–1	Belgium
Macaya 23'; E. Dualde 24'; J. Dualde 61'		Remy 50'

Olympic Velodrome, Rome
Umpires:
G. Singh (IND)
Ghosh (IND)

== Knockout stage ==
=== Bracket ===
Quarter-finals
5 September
Pakistan	2
Germany	1
5 September
Spain (a.e.t.)	1
New Zealand	0
5 September
India (a.e.t.)	1
Australia	0
5 September
Kenya	1
Great Britain (a.e.t.)	2

Semi-finals
7 September
Pakistan	1
Spain	0
7 September
India	1
Great Britain	0

Gold medal match
9 September
Pakistan	1
India	0
Bronze medal match
9 September
Spain	2
Great Britain	1

Quarter-final losers continued to play classification matches to determine 5th–8th place. The Great Britain versus Kenya match lasted 127 minutes and needed six overtime periods to determine the winner.

=== Quarter-finals ===
5 September 1960
09:00

India	1–0 (a.e.t.)	Australia
Bhola 84'

Olympic Velodrome, Rome
Umpires:
Whitelaw (GBR)
MacIldowie (RSA)

5 September 1960
15:00

Kenya	1–2 (a.e.t.)	Great Britain
Sohal 22'		Saunders 36', 115'

Olympic Velodrome, Rome
Umpires:
G. Singh (IND)
Ghosh (IND)

5 September 1960
14:30

Pakistan	2–1	United Team of Germany
Naseer 22', 62'		Delmes 52'

Olympic Velodrome, Rome
Umpires:
Asselman (BEL)
de Bourguignon (BEL)

5 September 1960
16:00

Spain	1–0 (a.e.t.)	New Zealand
Murua 83'

Olympic Velodrome, Rome
Umpires:
Elgershuizen (NED)
Van Ballgoijen de Jong (NED)

=== Semi-finals ===
7 September 1960
10:00

Pakistan	1–0	Spain
Manzoor 12'

Olympic Velodrome, Rome
Umpires:
MacDowell (AUS)
Massart (BEL)

7 September 1960
15:30

India	1–0	Great Britain
Kullar 16'

Olympic Velodrome, Rome
Umpires:
Elgershuizen (NED)
Schinner (GER)

=== Bronze medal match ===
9 September 1960
10:00

(bronze) Spain	2–1	Great Britain
J. Dualde 27'; E. Dualde 41'		Scott 13'

Olympic Velodrome, Rome
Umpires:
Elgershuizen (NED)
G. Singh (IND)

=== Gold medal match ===
9 September 1960
15:30

(gold) Pakistan	1–0	India (silver)
Bunda 11'

Olympic Velodrome, Rome
Umpires:
MacDowell (AUS)
Massart (BEL)

== Classification round ==
=== Fifth to eighth place classification ===
5–8th place semi-finals
8 September
New Zealand	1
Germany	0
8 September
Australia	2
Kenya	1

Fifth place
11 September
New Zealand	1
Australia	0

==== 5–8th place semi-finals ====
8 September 1960
15:00

New Zealand	1–0	United Team of Germany
McGregor 11'

Campo Tre Fontane, Rome
Umpires:
van Ballgoijen de Jong (NED)
H. Singh (IND)

8 September 1960
16:30

Australia	1–1	Kenya
Crossman 40'		Deol 63'

Olympic Velodrome, Rome
Umpires:
Elgershuizen (NED)
Glichitch (FRA)

The match was abandoned due to darkness with the score tied at 1-1 after 40 minutes of extra time. Australia was initially awarded the match after a coin toss. But after an appeal by Kenya, the match was declared drawn and a replay was ordered, which Australia won 2–1.

Replay

10 September 1960
16:30

Australia	2–1	Kenya
Evans 64', 69'		Panaser 42'

Campo Tre Fontane, Rome
Umpires:
Elgershuizen (NED)
Van Ballgoijen de Jong (NED)

==== Fifth place game ====
9 September 1960
08:30

Australia	2–1	New Zealand
Crossman 50'; Evans 68'		Cullen 27'

Campo Tre Fontane, Rome
Umpires:
Burgess (GBR)
Asselman (BEL)

After the Australia-Kenya match was declared a draw and a replay ordered on appeal, this match was declared null and void, and a replay was ordered between New Zealand and the winner of the Australia-Kenya replay.

Replay

11 September 1960
09:00

New Zealand	1–0	Australia
Bygrave 2'

Campo Tre Fontane, Rome
Umpires:
Burgess (GBR)
van Ballgoijen de Jong (NED)

==== Seventh place game ====
The seventh-place game between Germany and Kenya was scratched as the German team had flown home after the Closing Ceremony. Both teams were awarded joint seventh place.

=== Ninth to twelfth place classification ===
As Poland declined to participate in the classification matches, they were awarded twelfth place: the other three teams played a round-robin set of matches.

Pos	Team	Pld	W	D	L	GF	GA	GD	Pts
9	Netherlands	2	2	0	0	4	1	+3	4
10	France	2	1	0	1	1	2	−1	2
11	Belgium	2	0	0	2	1	3	−2	0
12	Poland	0	0	0	0	0	0	0	0

Source: FIH

6 September 1960
15:00

France	1–0	Belgium
Mauchien 22'

Campo Tre Fontane, Rome
Umpires:
Burgess (GBR)
Harasta (AUT)

An Italian traffic policeman on duty just outside the field blew his whistle. The Belgians thought it was the umpire's whistle and stopped playing, whereupon the French scored the only goal of the game.

8 September 1960
10:30

Netherlands	2–0	France
De Beer 3'; Van Vroonhoven 25'

Campo Tre Fontane, Rome
Umpires:
Lichtenfeld (GER)
Whitelaw (GBR)

10 September 1960
10:00

Netherlands	2–1	Belgium
De Beer 51', 62'		A. Muschs 66'

Olympic Velodrome, Rome
Umpires:
Burgess (GBR)
MacIldowie (RSA)

=== Thirteenth to sixteenth place classification ===
As Denmark declined to participate in the classification matches, they were awarded sixteenth place. The other three teams played a round-robin set of matches.

Pos	Team	Pld	W	D	L	GF	GA	GD	Pts
13	Italy (H)	2	1	1	0	3	2	+1	3
14	Japan	2	1	0	1	6	3	+3	2
15	Switzerland	2	0	1	1	2	6	−4	1
16	Denmark	0	0	0	0	0	0	0	0

Source: FIH
(H) Hosts

6 September 1960
16:30

Italy	1–1	Switzerland
Ballesio 6'		Recordon 32'

Campo Tre Fontane, Rome
Umpires:
Franck (BEL)
Matsunawa (JPN)

8 September 1960
09:00

Japan	5–1	Switzerland
H. Kojima 34', 49'; Kihara 51', 60', 67'		Zanetti 42'

Campo Tre Fontane, Rome
Umpires:
Asselman (BEL)
Ghosh (IND)

10 September 1960
15:00

Italy	2–1	Japan
Marchiori 21'; Lenza 47'		H. Kojima 2'

Olympic Velodrome, Rome
Umpires:
G. Singh (IND)
H. Singh (IND)

== Final standings ==
1. Pakistan
2. India
3. Spain
4. Great Britain
5. New Zealand
6. Australia
7. United Team of Germany
7. Kenya
9. Netherlands
10. France
11. Belgium
12. Poland
13. Italy
14. Japan
15. Switzerland
16. Denmark

== Medalists ==
Gold	Silver	Bronze
Pakistan; Abdul Hamid; Abdul Rashid; Abdul Waheed; Bashir Ahmad; Ghulam Rasul; Anwar Khan; Khursheed Aslam; Habib Ali Kiddie; Manzoor Hussain Atif; Munir Dar; Mushtaq Ahmad; Motiullah; Naseer Bunda; Noor Alam	India; Joseph Antic; Leslie Claudius; Jaman Lal Sharma; Mohinder Lal; Shankar Lakshman; John Peter; Govind Sawant; Raghbir Singh Bhola; Udham Singh Kullar; Charanjit Singh; Jaswant Singh; Joginder Singh; Prithipal Singh; Shantaram Jadhav	Spain; Pedro Amat; Francisco Caballer; Juan Calzado; José Colomer; Carlos del Coso; José Dinarés; Eduardo Dualde; Joaquín Dualde; Rafael Egusquiza; Ignacio Macaya; Pedro Murúa; Pedro Roig; Luis Usoz; Narciso Ventalló
