= India at the 1960 Summer Olympics =

- IOC code: IND
- NOC: Indian Olympic Association

in Rome
- Competitors: 45 (all men) in 6 sports
- Medals Ranked 32nd: Gold 0 Silver 1 Bronze 0 Total 1

Summer Olympics appearances (overview)
- 1900; 1904–1912; 1920; 1924; 1928; 1932; 1936; 1948; 1952; 1956; 1960; 1964; 1968; 1972; 1976; 1980; 1984; 1988; 1992; 1996; 2000; 2004; 2008; 2012; 2016; 2020; 2024; 2028

Other related appearances
- Pakistan (1948–pres.); Bangladesh (1984–pres.)

India competed at the 1960 Summer Olympics in Rome, Italy. 45 competitors, all men, took part in 20 events in 6 sports. India's only medal in the Games was a silver in men's field hockey, when they lost to Pakistan in the final, ending the country's hockey gold-winning streak that had started in 1928 in British India. Athlete Milkha Singh finished 4th in Men's 400m.

== Medalists ==
| Medal | Athlete | Sports | Event |
|---|---|---|---|
| Silver | Joseph Antic Leslie Claudius Jaman Lal Sharma Mohinder Lal Shankar Lakshman John Peter Govind Sawant Raghbir Singh Bhola Udham Singh Kullar Charanjit Singh Jaswant Singh Joginder Singh Prithipal Singh | Field hockey | Men's Tournament |

== Competitors ==
| Sport | Men | Women | Total | Events |
|---|---|---|---|---|
| Athletics | 8 | 0 | 8 | 6 |
| Football | 14 | 0 | 14 | 1 |
| Field hockey | 14 | 0 | 14 | 1 |
| Shooting | 3 | 0 | 3 | 2 |
| Weightlifting | 1 | 0 | 1 | 1 |
| Wrestling | 5 | 0 | 5 | 5 |
| Total | 45 | 0 | 45 | 16 |

== Athletics ==
8 Athletes represents India in 1960 Summer Olympics. Milkha Singh finished second in all of the 400m rounds prior to the final, improving his time on each occasion. In the final he finished fourth with a time of 45.6, this being a decision that required a photo-finish. His finishing position was not bettered by an Indian track athlete until the 1984 Olympics.

Men
Track and Road Events

| Athlete | Event | Round 1 | | Round 2 | | Semifinal | | Final | |
| Athlete | Event | Result | Rank | Result | Rank | Result | Rank | Result | Rank |
|---|---|---|---|---|---|---|---|---|---|
| Milkha Singh | 400 m | 47:60 NR | 3 Q | 46:5 | 2 Q | 45:9 | 2 Q | 45:6 | 4 |
| Jagmohan Singh | 110 m Hurdles | 15:34 | 5 | Did Not Advance | | | | | |
| Lal Chand | Marathon | N/A | | | | | | 2:32:13.0 | 40 |
| Jagmal Singh | Marathon | N/A | | | | | | 2:35:01.0 | 45 |
| Ranjit Bhatia | Marathon | N/A | | | | | | 2:57:06.0 | 60 |
| Ranjit Bhatia | 5000m | 15:06.6 | 11 | N/A | | | | Did Not Advance | |
| Ajit Singh | 20 km walk | N/A | | | | | | | DSQ |
| Ajit Singh | 50 km walk | N/A | | | | | | 4:47:28.4 | 15 |
| Zora Singh | 20 km walk | N/A | | | | | | 1:43:19.8 | 20 |
| Zora Singh | 50 km walk | N/A | | | | | | 4:37:44.6 | 8 |

Field Events

| Athlete | Event | Qualification | | Final | |
| Athlete | Event | Result | Rank | Result | Rank |
|---|---|---|---|---|---|
| Gurbachan Singh Randhawa | High Jump | 1.90m | 27 | Did Not Advance | |
| B.V. Satyanarayan | Long Jump | 6.70m | 44 | Did Not Advance | |
| Virsa Singh | Long Jump | 7.08m | 30 | Did Not Advance | |

== Field hockey ==
India played a few practice matches leading into the group stage games. They defeated Great Britain 8–0 on 22 August and Australia 5–2 three days later. This was the first time since 1928 that the Men's team failed to achieve a gold medal in field hockey. They lost 1–0 to Pakistan by a goal Ahmad Nasir to secure the second position.

Team Roster:

- Joseph Antic
- Leslie Claudius
- Jaman Lal Sharma
- Mohinder Lal
- Shankar Lakshman
- John Peter
- Govind Sawant
- Raghbir Singh Bhola
- Udham Singh Kullar
- Charanjit Singh
- Jaswant Singh
- Joginder Singh
- Prithipal Singh

Summary

| Team | Event | Group Stage | | | | Quarterfinal | Semifinal | Final / BM | |
| Team | Event | Opposition Score | Opposition Score | Opposition Score | Rank | Opposition Score | Opposition Score | Opposition Score | Rank |
|---|---|---|---|---|---|---|---|---|---|
| India men's | Men's tournament | Denmark; W 10–0 | Netherlands; W 4–1 | New Zealand; W 3–0 | 1 | Australia; W 1–0 | Great Britain; W 1–0 | Pakistan; L 0–1 | 2nd place, silver medalist(s) |

=== Group A ===
| Pos | Team | Pld | W | D | L | GF | GA | GD | Pts | Qualification |
|---|---|---|---|---|---|---|---|---|---|---|
| 1 | India | 3 | 3 | 0 | 0 | 17 | 1 | +16 | 6 | Quarter-finals |
| 2 | New Zealand (Note: New Zealand and the Netherlands finished on equal points at the conclusion of the pool stage, resulting in a match to determine second place in the pool, which New Zealand won 2–1.) | 3 | 1 | 1 | 1 | 5 | 5 | 0 | 3 | Quarter-finals |
| 3 | Netherlands | 3 | 1 | 1 | 1 | 6 | 7 | −1 | 3 | 9–12th place classification |
| 4 | Denmark | 3 | 0 | 0 | 3 | 3 | 18 | −15 | 0 | 13–16th place classification |

Source: FIH
Notes:

27 August 1960
15:00

| India | 10–0 | Denmark |
|---|---|---|
| P. Singh 1', 15', 16'; Bhola 22', 31', 67'; Peter 41'; Ja. Singh 64' ? ? |

Stadio dei Marmi, Rome
Umpires:
McIldowie (RSA)
Whitelaw (GBR)

30 August 1960
16:30

| India | 4–1 | Netherlands |
|---|---|---|
| Ja. Singh 26'; Bhola 63'; P. Singh 66', 69' | | Van Vroonhoven 9' |

Stadio dei Marmi, Rome
Umpires:
de Bourguignon (BEL)
Asselman (BEL)

2 September 1960
16:30

| India | 3–0 | New Zealand |
|---|---|---|
| Bhola 8'; Peter 57'; Ja. Singh 70' |

Olympic Velodrome, Rome
Umpires:
McIldowie (RSA)
Whitelaw (GBR)

=== Quarter-finals ===
5 September 1960
09:00

| India | 1–0 (a.e.t.) | Australia |
|---|---|---|
| Bhola 84' |

Olympic Velodrome, Rome
Umpires:
Whitelaw (GBR)
MacIldowie (RSA)

=== Semi-finals ===
7 September 1960
15:30

| India | 1–0 | Great Britain |
|---|---|---|
| Kullar 16' |

Olympic Velodrome, Rome
Umpires:
Elgershuizen (NED)
Schinner (GER)

=== Gold medal match ===
9 September 1960
15:30

| Pakistan | 1–0 | India |
|---|---|---|
| Bunda 6' |

Olympic Velodrome, Rome
Umpires:
MacDowell (AUS)
Massart (BEL)

== Football ==
=== Group D ===
| Team | Pld | W | D | L | GF | GA | GD | Pts |
|---|---|---|---|---|---|---|---|---|
| Hungary | 3 | 3 | 0 | 0 | 15 | 3 | +12 | 6 |
| France | 3 | 1 | 1 | 1 | 3 | 9 | −6 | 3 |
| Peru | 3 | 1 | 0 | 2 | 6 | 9 | −3 | 2 |
| India | 3 | 0 | 1 | 2 | 3 | 6 | −3 | 1 |

August 26, 1960
12:00

| Hungary | 2 – 1 | India |
|---|---|---|
| Göröcs 23'; Albert 56' | Report | Balaraman 79' |

L'Aquila
Referee: Ben Said (TUN)

August 29, 1960
12:00

| France | 1 – 1 | India |
|---|---|---|
| Coinçon 82' | Report | Banerjee 71' |

Grosseto, Stadio Olimpico Comunale
Referee: Morgan (CAN)

September 1, 1960
12:00

| Peru | 3 – 1 | India |
|---|---|---|
| Nieri 27', 53'; Iwasaki 85' | Report | Balaraman 88' |

Pescara
Referee: Imam (UAE)

== Shooting ==
Three shooters represented India in 1960.

| Athlete | Event | Score | Rank |
|---|---|---|---|
| Paul Cheema Singh | Men's 25m Rapid Fire Pistol | 434 | 57 |
| Karni Singh | Men's Trap | 183 | 8 |
| Keshav Sen | Men's Trap | - | AC QR |

== Weightlifting ==
| Athlete | Event | Total(Kgs) | Rank |
|---|---|---|---|
| Laxmi Kanta Das | Men's 60 kg | 315.0 | 12 |

== Wrestling ==
Key:

- VT - Victory by Fall.
- Pt - Decision by Points.
- Pd - Decision by Points but Judges disagree.

Men's freestyle

| Athlete | Event | Round 1 Result | Round 2 Result | Round 3 Result | Round 4 Result | Round 5 Result | Round 6 Result | Round 7 Result | Rank |
|---|---|---|---|---|---|---|---|---|---|
| S. Shiam | −62 kg | J. Mewis (BEL); L ^{VT} | did not advance | | | | | | 25 |
| Gian Prakash | −67 kg | Shelby Wilson (USA); L ^{Pt} | J. Yanez (CUB); W ^{Pt} | M. Peltoniemi (FIN); L ^{Pt} | did not advance | | | —N/a | 15 |
| Udey Chand | −73 kg | J. Feeney (IRL); W ^{Pt} | V. Balavadze (URS); L ^{Pt} | İsmail Ogan (TUR); L ^{VT} | did not advance | | | —N/a | 14 |
| Madho Singh | −79 kg | A. Butts (GBR); W ^{VT} | G. Caraffini (ITA); W ^{VT} | Hans Antonsson (SWE); L ^{Pt} | Georgy Skhirtladze (URS); L ^{Pt} | did not advance | —N/a | | 5 |
| Sajjan Singh | −87 kg | A. Marcucci (ITA); W ^{Pt} | D. Rauchbach (EUA); W ^{VT} | G. Gurics (HUN); L ^{VT} | V. Palm (SWE); L ^{Pt} | did not advance | | —N/a | 7 |
