= New Zealand at the 1960 Summer Olympics =

- IOC code: NZL (NZE used at these Games)
- NOC: New Zealand Olympic and British Empire Games Association
- Website: www.olympic.org.nz

in Rome
- Competitors: 37 in 9 sports
- Flag bearer: Les Mills
- Officials: 11
- Medals Ranked 14th: Gold 2 Silver 0 Bronze 1 Total 3

Summer Olympics appearances (overview)
- 1908; 1912; 1920; 1924; 1928; 1932; 1936; 1948; 1952; 1956; 1960; 1964; 1968; 1972; 1976; 1980; 1984; 1988; 1992; 1996; 2000; 2004; 2008; 2012; 2016; 2020; 2024

Other related appearances
- Australasia (1908–1912)

New Zealand at the 1960 Summer Olympics was represented by a team of 37 competitors, 33 men and four women, who took part in 28 events across nine sports. Selection of the team for the Games in Rome, Italy, was the responsibility of the New Zealand Olympic and British Empire Games Association. New Zealand's flagbearer at the opening ceremony was Les Mills. Harold Austad was the team's Chef de Mission. The New Zealand team finished 14th on the medal table, winning a total of three medals, two of which were gold.

== Medal tables ==
Medal	Name	Sport	Event	Date
Gold	Peter Snell	Athletics	Men's 800 metres	2 September
Gold	Murray Halberg	Athletics	Men's 5000 metres	2 September
Bronze	Barry Magee	Athletics	Men's marathon	10 September

Medals by sport
Sport	Gold medal	Silver medal	Bronze medal	Total
Athletics	2	0	1	3
Total	2	0	1	3

Medals by gender
Gender	Gold medal	Silver medal	Bronze medal	Total
Male	2	0	1	3
Female	0	0	0	0
Total	2	0	1	3

== Athletics ==
=== Track and road ===
Athlete	Event	Heat		Quarterfinal		Semifinal		Final	
Athlete	Event	Result	Rank (Note: Ranks given are within the heat)	Result	Rank (Note: Ranks given are within the quarterfinal)	Result	Rank (Note: Ranks given are within the semifinal)	Result	Rank
Murray Halberg	Men's 5000 m	14:04.28	2 Q	—N/a				13:43.76	1st place, gold medalist(s)
Murray Halberg	Men's 10,000 m	—N/a						28:49.11	5
Jeff Julian	Men's marathon	—N/a						2:24:50.6	18
Barry Magee	Men's 10,000 m	—N/a						30:35.80	26
Barry Magee	Men's marathon	—N/a						2:17:18.2	3rd place, bronze medalist(s)
Valerie Morgan	Women's 100 m	12.61	3	12.66	7	did not advance			
Valerie Morgan	Women's 200 m	25.39	5	—N/a		did not advance			
Ray Puckett	Men's marathon	—N/a						2:37:36.0	51
Norman Read	Men's 20 km walk	—N/a						1:36:59.0	5
Norman Read	Men's 50 km walk	—N/a						DNF	
Barry Robinson	Men's 200 m	22.2	5	did not advance					
Barry Robinson	Men's 400 m	47.6	2 Q	48.3	6	did not advance			
Donal Smith	Men's 800 m	1:51.86	1 Q	1:48.52	4	did not advance			
Peter Snell	Men's 800 m	1:48.22	1 Q	1:48.84	2 Q	1:47.34	1 Q	1:46.48 OR	1st place, gold medalist(s)

=== Field ===
Athlete	Event	Qualification		Final	
Athlete	Event	Result	Rank	Result	Rank
Dave Norris	Men's long jump	7.04	32	did not advance	
Dave Norris	Men's triple jump	14.30	36	did not advance	
Les Mills	Men's discus throw	50.76	28	did not advance	
Les Mills	Men's shot put	16.93	11 Q	17.06	11
Valerie Sloper	Women's discus throw	46.91	12 q	48.81	10
Valerie Sloper	Women's shot put	16.07	2 Q	16.39	4
Jennifer Thompson	Women's discus throw	46.74	14	did not advance	
Beverly Weigel	Women's long jump	6.12	5 Q	5.98	10

== Cycling ==
One male cyclist represented New Zealand in 1960.

=== Track ===
Men's 1000 m time trial

Athlete	Time	Rank
Warwick Dalton	1:10.68	11

== Equestrian ==
=== Jumping ===
Athlete	Horse	Event	Round 1		Round 2		Overall	
Athlete	Horse	Event	Faults	Rank	Faults	Rank	Faults	Rank
Adrian White	Telebrae	Individual	33.25	35	12	=4	45.25	23

== Fencing ==
One fencer represented New Zealand in 1960.

Athlete	Event	Round 1 pool						Round 2 pool						Quarterfinal pool	Semifinal pool	Final pool	Rank
Athlete	Event	Opposition Result	Opposition Result	Opposition Result	Opposition Result	Opposition Result	Wins	Opposition Result	Opposition Result	Opposition Result	Opposition Result	Opposition Result	Wins	Quarterfinal pool	Semifinal pool	Final pool	Rank
Brian Pickworth	Men's individual épée	Gonsior (POL); L 1 – 5	El-Gressy (MAR); W 5 – 1	Barouch (TUN); W 5 – 3	Echeverry (COL); W 5 – 2	Guittet (FRA); W 5 – 3	4	Balestrini (ARG); L 1 – 5	Achten (BEL); L 3 – 5	Glos (POL); L 3 – 5	Pellegrino (ITA); L 1 – 5	Sákovics (HUN); L 1 – 5	0	did not advance			
Brian Pickworth	Men's individual foil	Paladino (URU); W 5 – 4	Debeur (BEL); L 1 – 5	González (ESP); L 1 – 5	Csipler (ROU); L 4 – 5	Zhdanovich (URS); L 2 – 5	1	Did not advance									
Brian Pickworth	Men's individual sabre	Amberg (GBR); W 5 – 4	Haschja (INA); L 4 – 5	Chicca (ITA); L 4 – 5	Paladino (URU); L 3 – 5	Zabłocki (POL); L 0 – 5	1	Did not advance									

== Field hockey ==
=== Men's tournament ===
Team roster

John Abrams; James Barclay; Phillip Bygrave; John Cullen; Ross Gillespie; Anthony Hayde; Noel Hobson	Ian Kerr; Murray Mathieson; Guy McGregor; Mervyn McKinnon; Kevin Percy; Bill Schaefer; Bruce Turner

Group A

27 August 1960
16:30

New Zealand	1–1 (1–1)	Netherlands
Hobson 25'		Van Erven Dorens 23'

Stadio dei Marmi
Umpires:
Franck (BEL), Massart (BEL)

31 August 1960
16:30

New Zealand	4–1 (3–1)	Denmark
Hobson 4'; Turner 24', 41'; Bygrave 35'		Christiansen 16'

Olympic Velodrome
Umpires:
McDowell (AUS), Glichitch (FRA)

2 September 1960
16:30

India	3–0 (1–0)	New Zealand
Bhola 8'; Peter 57'; Ja. Singh 70'

Olympic Velodrome
Umpires:
McIldowie (SAF), Whitelaw (GBR)

Team	Pld	W	D	L	GF	GA	Pts	Qualification
India	3	3	0	0	17	1	6	Advance to quarter-finals
New Zealand	3	1	1	1	5	5	3	Tie-breaker to determine second place in group
Netherlands	3	1	1	1	6	7	3	Tie-breaker to determine second place in group
Denmark	3	0	1	2	0	5	1	13th–16th classification round

Group A tie-breaker

4 September 1960
15:30

New Zealand	2–1 (1–1)	Netherlands
Bygrave 31', 58'		De Beer 14'

Campo Tre Fontane
Umpires:
Schinner (GER), Lichtenfeld (GER)

By winning the Group A tie-breaker match, New Zealand advanced to the quarter-finals, while the Netherlands continued to the classification matches for 9th to 12th places.

Quarter-final

5 September 1960
16:00

Spain	1–0 (0–0)	New Zealand
Murua 83'

Olympic Velodrome
Umpires:
Elgershuizen (NED), Van Ballgoijen de Jong (NED)

After losing its quarter-final, New Zealand moved into the classification matches for 5th to 8th places.

5th–8th Classification matches

8 September 1960
15:00

New Zealand	1–0 (1–0)	Germany
McGregor 11'

Campo Tre Fontane
Umpires:
Van Ballgoijen de Jong (NED), H. Singh (IND)

New Zealand moved into the playoff for 5th and 6th places by defeating Germany.

9 September 1960
08:30

Australia	2–1 (0–1)	New Zealand
Crossman 50'; Evans 68'		Cullen 27'

Campo Tre Fontane
Umpires:
Burgess (GBR), Asselman (BEL)

The match to decide 5th and 6th positions between Australia and New Zealand was declared null and void after Australia's previous match against Kenya was declared drawn on appeal. Australia subsequently defeated Kenya in a replay, and then a replay was required between New Zealand and Australia to decide 5th place.

5th–6th Classification replay

11 September 1960
09:00

New Zealand	1–0 (0–0)	Australia
Bygrave 2'

Campo Tre Fontane
Umpires:
Burgess (GBR), van Ballgoijen de Jong (NED)

New Zealand finished the men's field hockey tournament in 5th place.

== Rowing ==
In 1960, seven rowing competitions were held, and New Zealand entered a single rower: James Hill competing in single sculls. The competition was for men only; women would first row at the 1976 Summer Olympics.

Athlete	Event	Heats		Repechage		Final	
Athlete	Event	Time	Rank	Time	Rank	Time	Rank
James Hill	Single sculls	7:19.64	1 FA	Bye		7:23.98	4

== Sailing ==
Athlete	Event	Race							Net points	Final rank
Athlete	Event	1	2	3	4	5	6	7	Net points	Final rank
Ralph Roberts	Finn	441	~~0~~; ~~DSQ~~	867	742	800	946	1344	5140	6
Murray Rae (helm); Ron Watson	Flying Dutchman	638	1115	446	990	638	~~101~~; ~~DNF~~	814	4641	8

Helmer Pedersen was a reserve but did not compete.

== Weightlifting ==
Athlete	Event	Press		Snatch		Clean & Jerk		Total	Rank
Athlete	Event	Result	Rank	Result	Rank	Result	Rank	Total	Rank
Don Oliver	Men's heavyweight	132.5	=16	122.5	=14	170.0	=8	425.0	13

== Wrestling ==
Athlete	Event	Round 1	Round 2	Round 3	Round 4	Final	Rank
Athlete	Event	Opposition Result	Opposition Result	Opposition Result	Opposition Result	Opposition Result	Rank
Fred Thomas	Men's freestyle middleweight	Mehdizadeh (IRI); W Fall	Graffigna (ARG); W 3–0	Gardzhev (BUL); L Fall	Antonsson (SWE); L Fall	Eliminated	10

== Officials ==
- Chef de Mission – Harold Austad
- Assistant team manager – George Thorn
- Physiotherapist and masseur – Stanley Paris
- Athletics section manager – Joe McManemin
- Field hockey section manager – Jack Squire
- Rowing section manager – Charles Saunders
- Sailing section manager – Hugh Poole
- Weightlifting section manager – John Cullen
- Wrestling section manager – Jack Prestney
