= List of Olympic venues in field hockey =

For the Summer Olympics, there are 34 venues that have been or will be used for field hockey. The competitions were first held at the Olympic Stadium until 1928 when it was held at a stadium that did not have the Olympic Stadium title. From 1936 to 1960 with the exception of 1952, the competitions were held in more than one venue. Artificial turf made its Olympic debut at the 1976 Summer Olympics. The last field hockey competitions that was not held on a single venue was in 1996.

Games	Venue	Other sports hosted at venues for these games	Capacity	Ref.
1908 London	White City Stadium	Archery, Athletics, Cycling (track), Diving, Football, Gymnastics, Lacrosse, Rugby union, Swimming, Tug of war, Water polo (final), Wrestling	97,000.	
1920 Antwerp	Olympisch Stadion	Athletics, Equestrian, Football (final), Gymnastics, Modern pentathlon, Rugby union, Tug of war, Weightlifting	12,771	
1928 Amsterdam	Old Stadion	None	29,000	
1932 Los Angeles	Olympic Stadium	Athletics, Equestrian (eventing, jumping), Gymnastics	105,000	
1936 Berlin	Hockey Stadion (final)	None	18,000	
1936 Berlin	Hockey Stadion #2	None	1600	
1948 London	Empire Stadium (medal matches)	Athletics, Equestrian (jumping), Football (medal matches)	82,000	
1948 London	Guinness Sports Club	None	Not listed.	
1948 London	Lyons' Sports Club	None	Not listed.	
1948 London	Polytechnic Sports Ground	None	Not listed.	
1952 Helsinki	Velodrome	Cycling (track)	6,000	
1956 Melbourne	Hockey Field	None	21,048	
1956 Melbourne	Melbourne Cricket Ground (final)	Athletics, Football (final)	104,000	
1960 Rome	Campo Tre Fontane	None	5,000	
1960 Rome	Olympic Velodrome (final)	Cycling (track)	20,000	
1960 Rome	Stadio dei Marmi	None	15,000	
1964 Tokyo	Komazawa Hockey Field	None	2,000 (1st field); 3,400 (2nd field); 2,300 (3rd field)	
1968 Mexico City	Municipal Stadium	None	7,360	
1972 Munich	Hockeyanlage	None	21,900	
1976 Montreal	Molson Stadium, McGill University	None	19,500	
1980 Moscow	Dynamo Central Stadium, Minor Arena	None	5,000	
1980 Moscow	Young Pioneers Stadium (final)	None	5,000	
1984 Los Angeles	Weingart Stadium	None	22,000	
1988 Seoul	Seongnam Stadium	None	23,262	
1992 Barcelona	Estadi Olímpic de Terrassa	None	10,200	
1996 Atlanta	Clark Atlanta University Stadium	None	5,000	
1996 Atlanta	Morris Brown College Stadium (final)	None	15,000	
2000 Sydney	State Hockey Centre	None	15,000	
2004 Athens	Olympic Hockey Centre	None	20,000	
2008 Beijing	Olympic Green Hockey Field	None	17,000	
2012 London	Riverbank Arena	None	16,000	
2016 Rio de Janeiro	Olympic Hockey Centre	None	15,000	
2020 Tokyo	Oi Seaside Park	None	15,000	
2024 Paris	Stade Olympique Yves-du-Manoir	None	15,000	
2028 Los Angeles	Dignity Health Sports Park	Modern pentathlon, rugby sevens	15,000	
2032 Brisbane	Ballymore Stadium	None	10,000	

== Gallery of venues ==
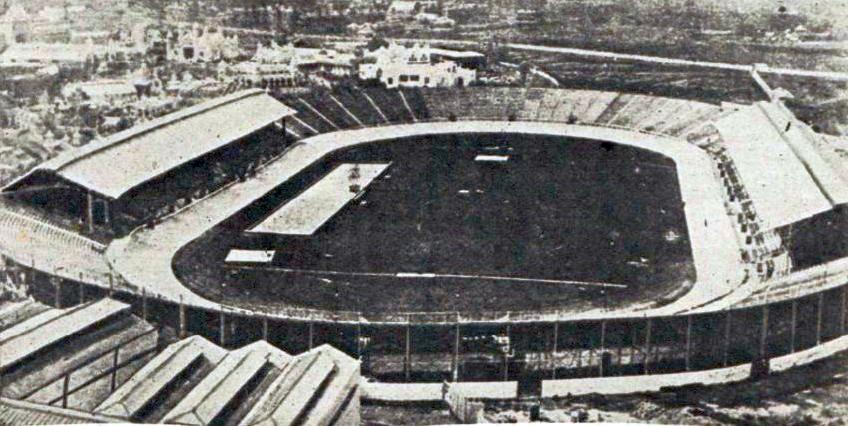
White City Stadium hosted field hockey at the 1908 Summer Olympics in London.

The Los Angeles Memorial Coliseum hosted field hockey at the 1932 Summer Olympics.

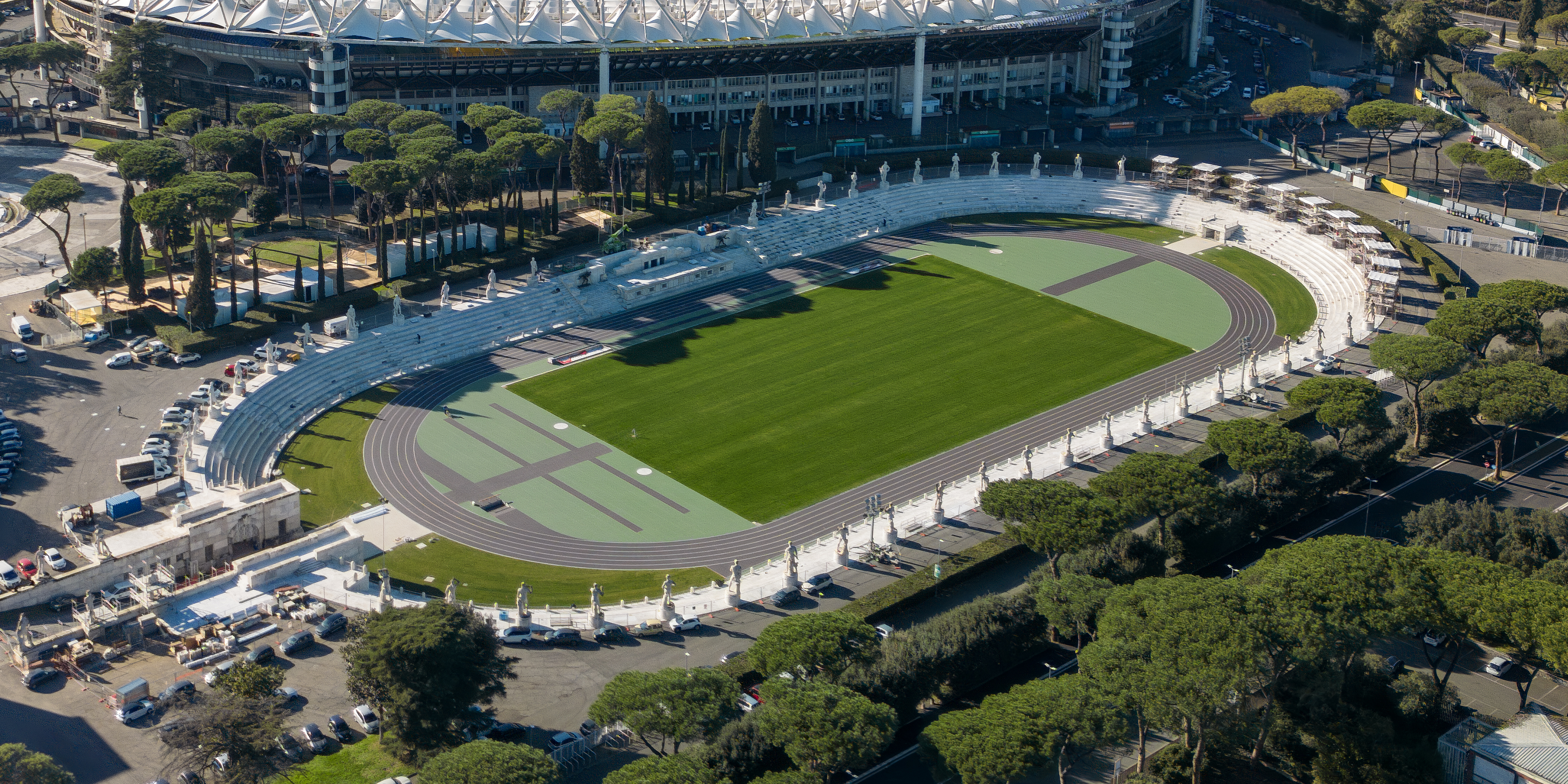
Stadio dei Marmi hosted field hockey at the 1960 Summer Olympics in Rome.

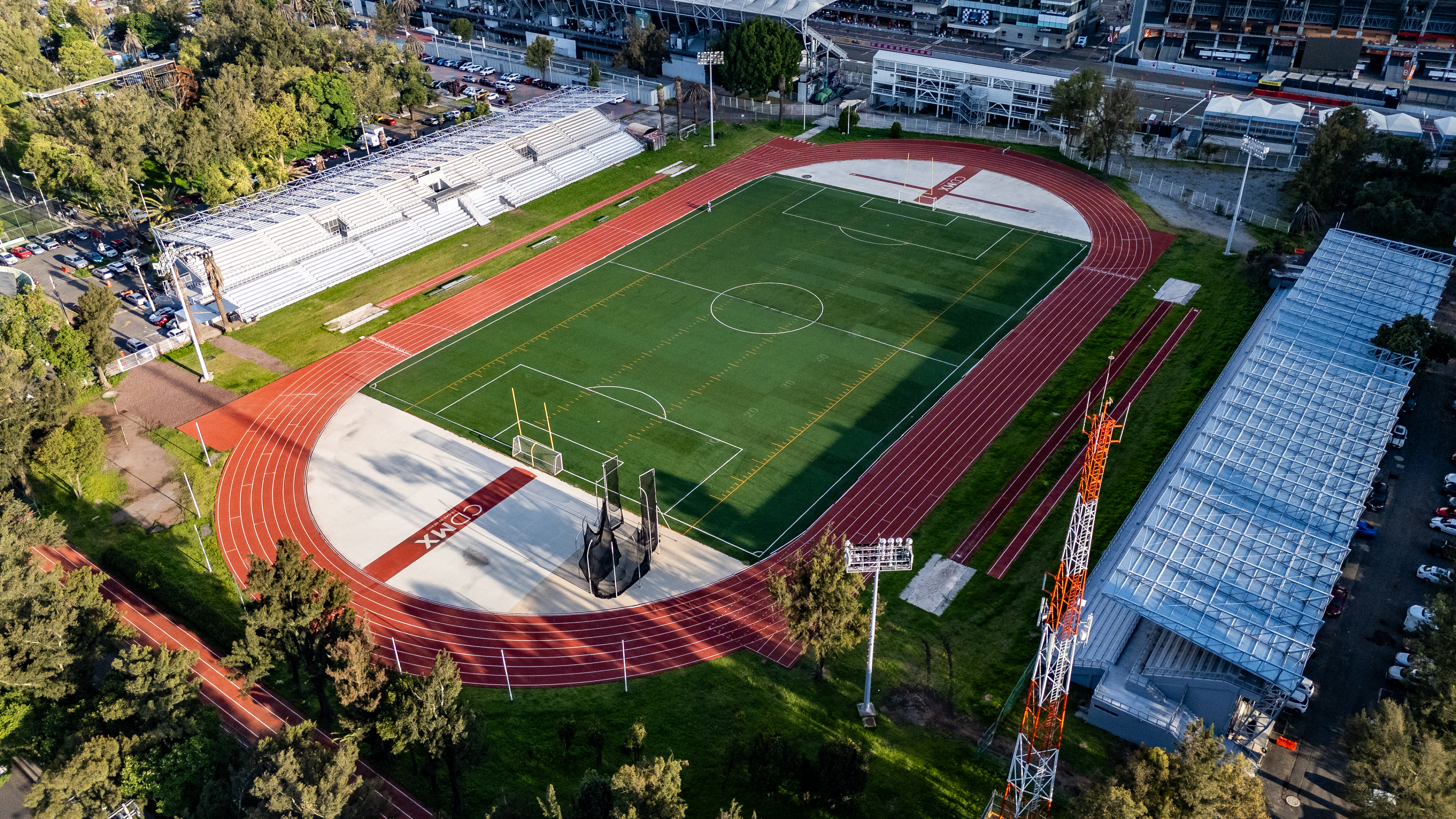
Estadio Jesús Martínez "Palillo" hosted field hockey at the 1968 Summer Olympics in Mexico City.

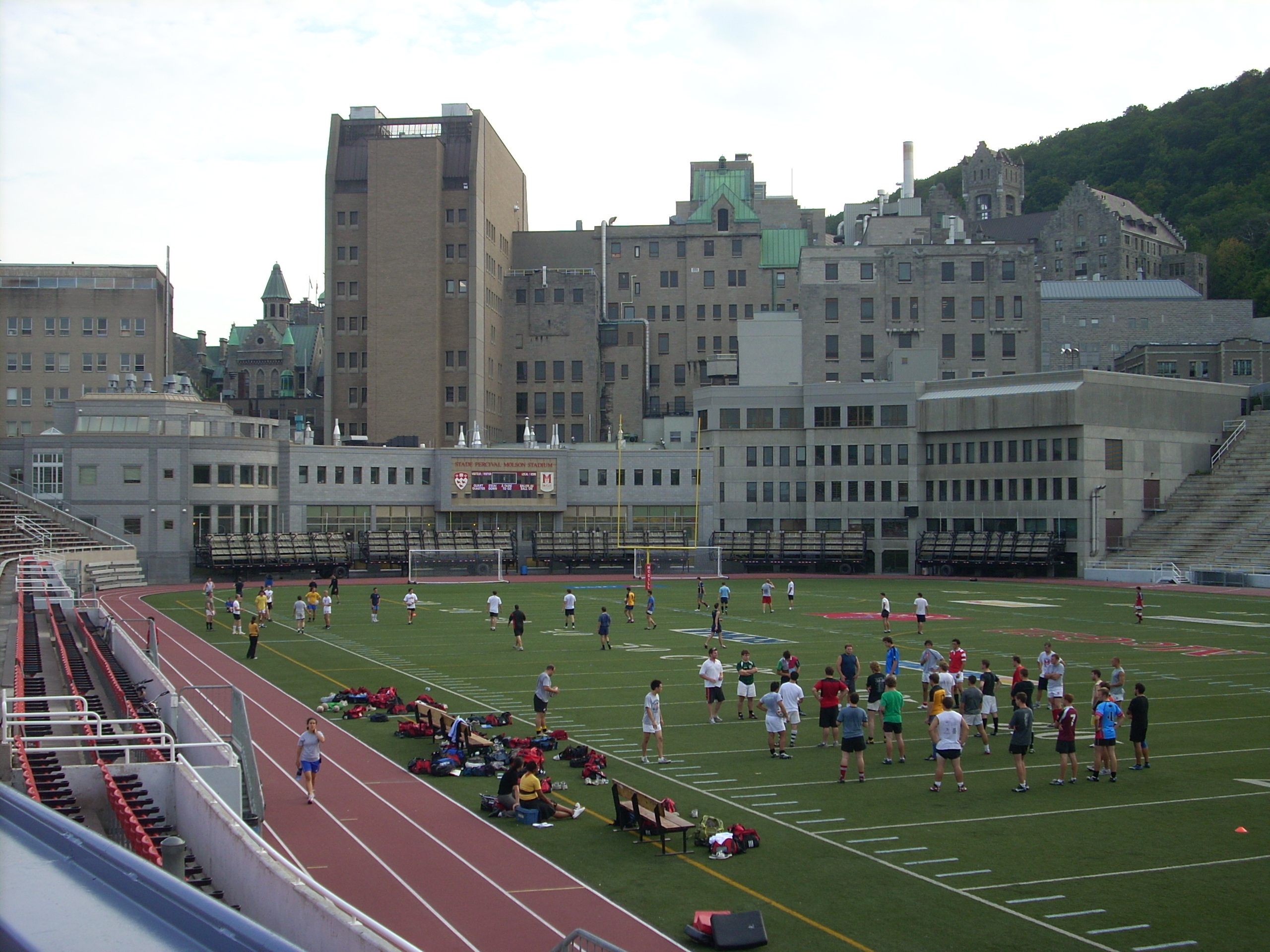
Molson Stadium (front at bottom) hosted field hockey at the 1976 Summer Olympics in Montreal. This was the first venue in which the sport was played on artificial turf.

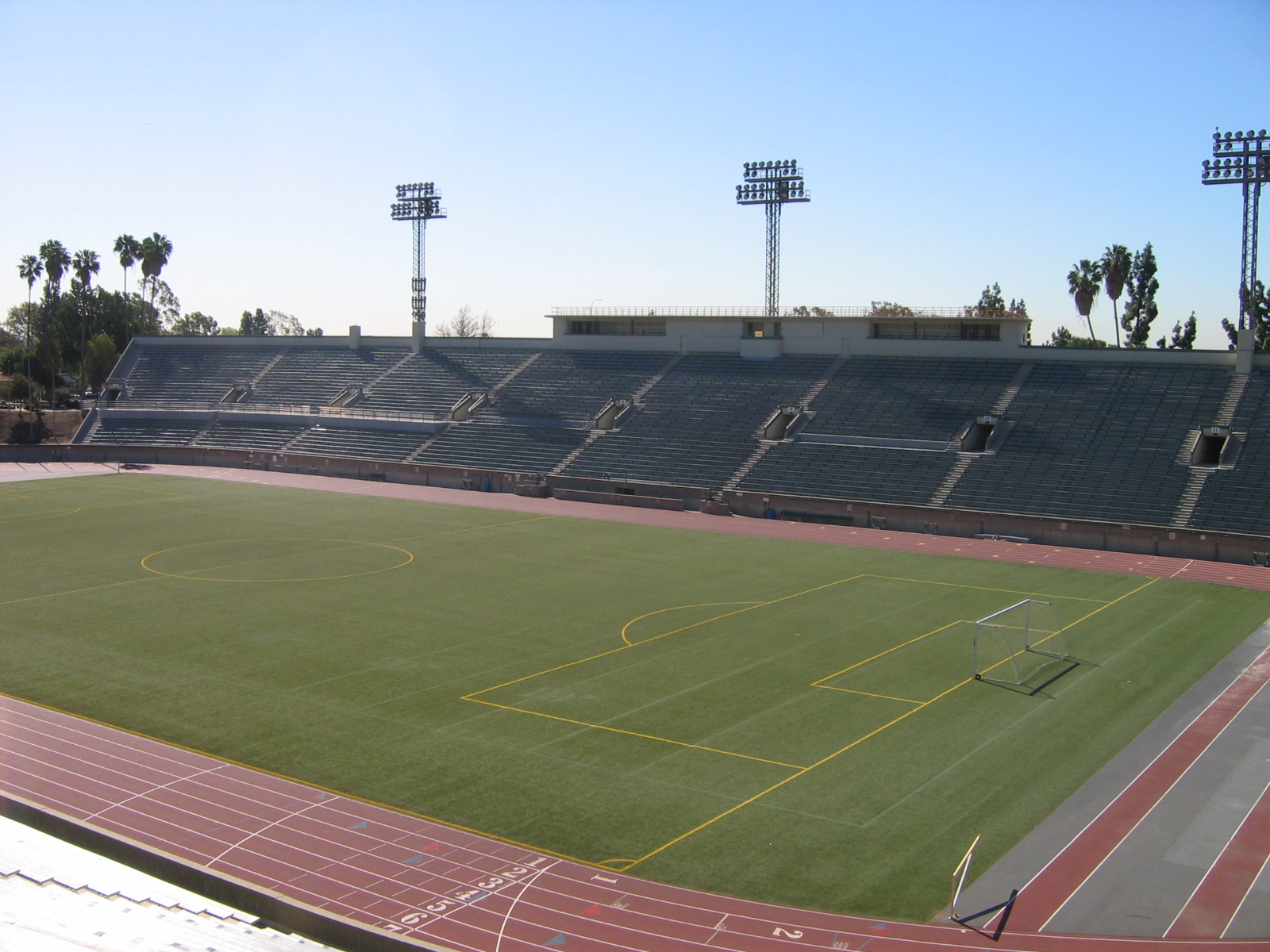
Weingart Stadium hosted field hockey at the 1984 Summer Olympics in Los Angeles.

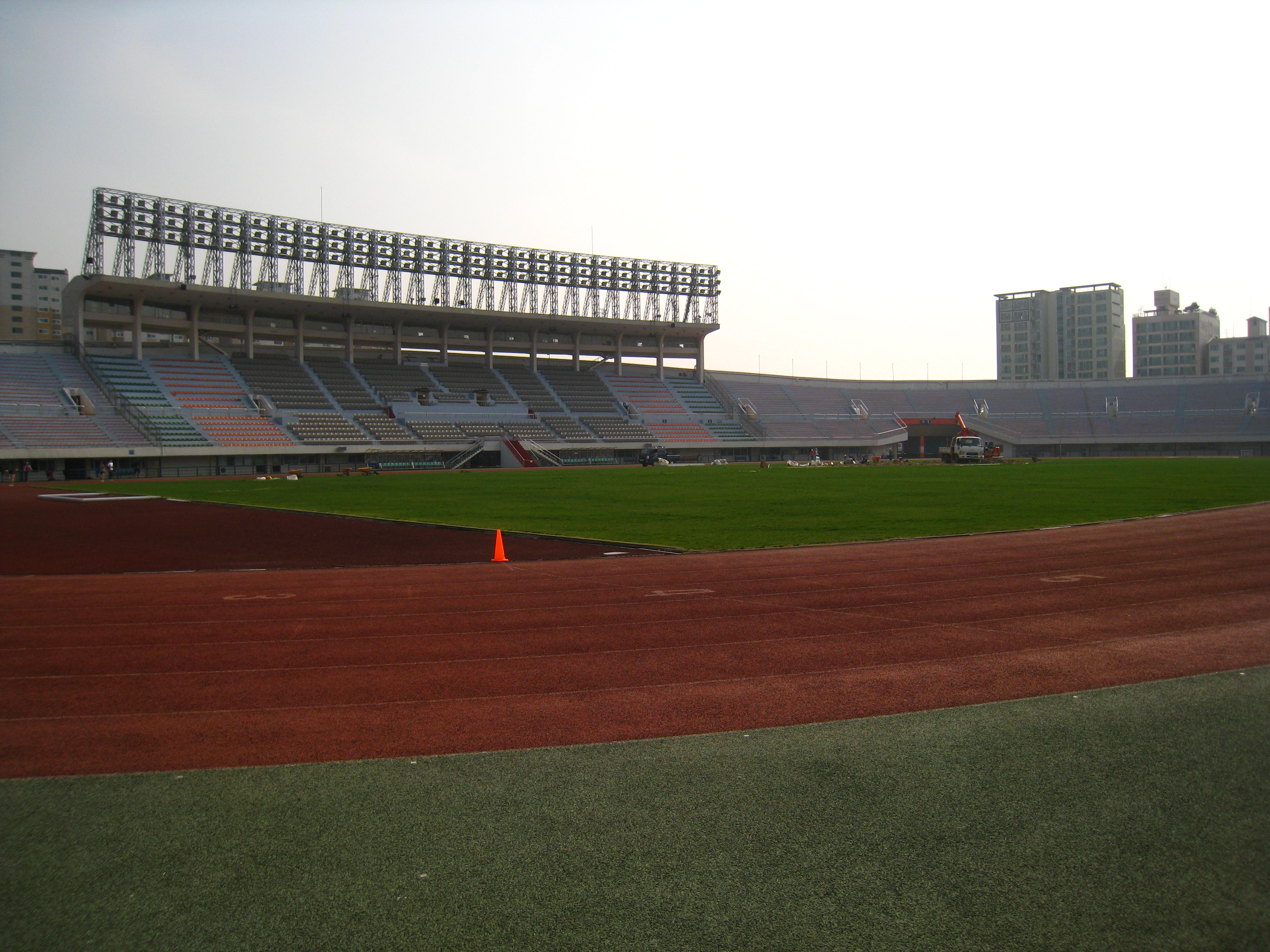
Seongnam Sports Complex hosted field hockey at the 1988 Summer Olympics in Seoul.

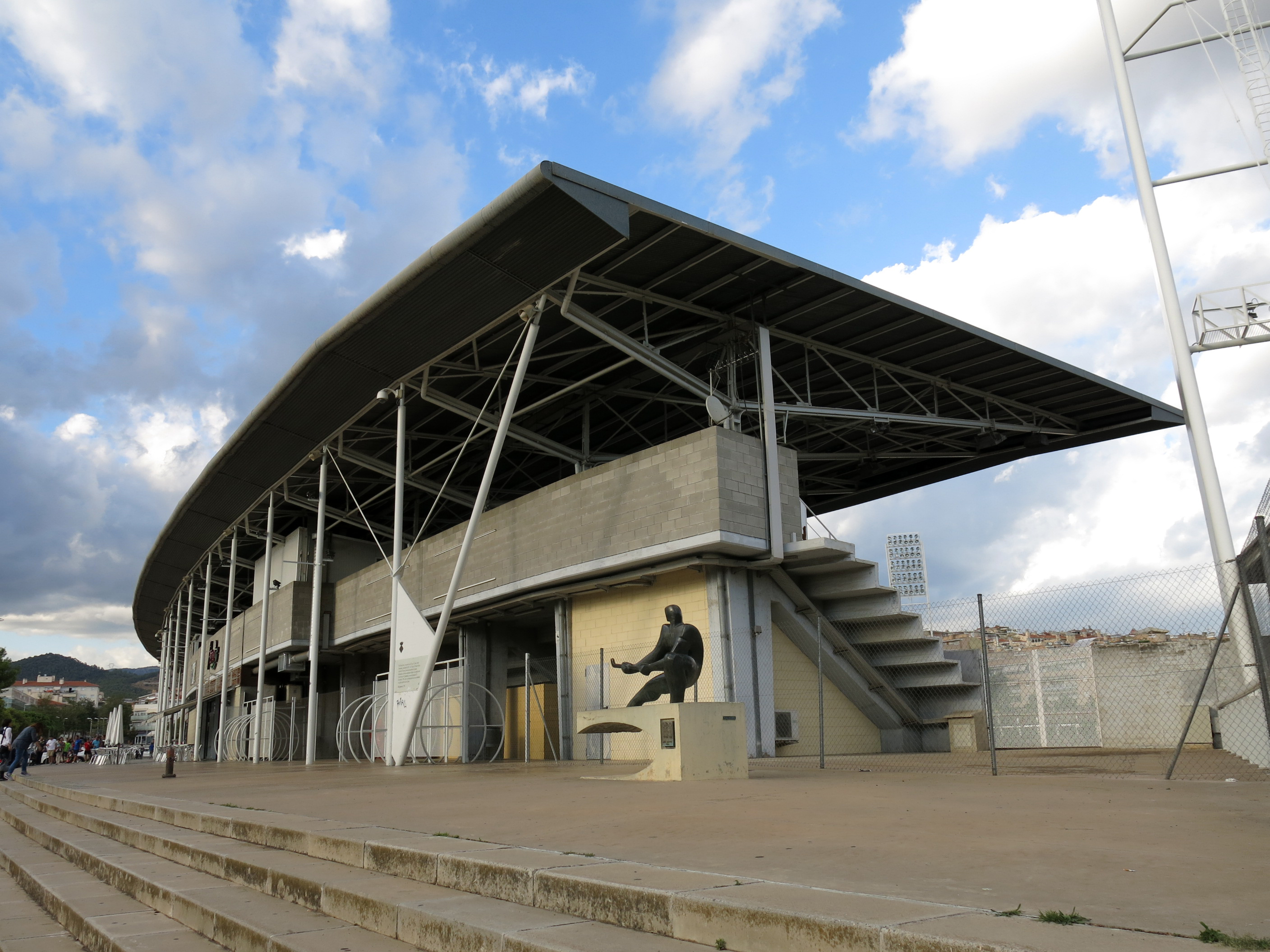
Estadi Olímpic de Terrassa hosted field hockey at the 1992 Summer Olympics in Barcelona.

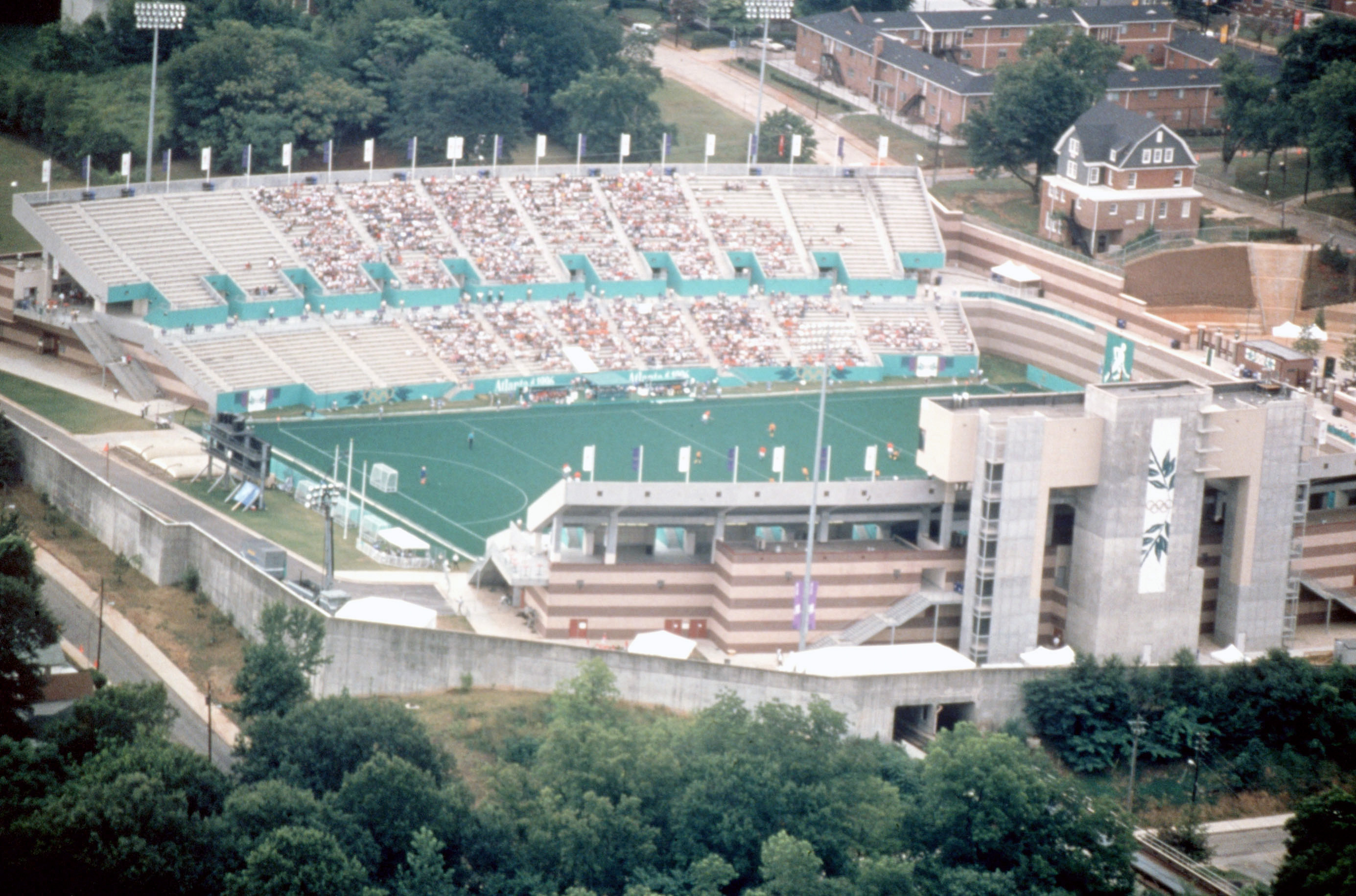
Morris Brown College Stadium hosted the field hockey finals for the 1996 Summer Olympics in Atlanta.

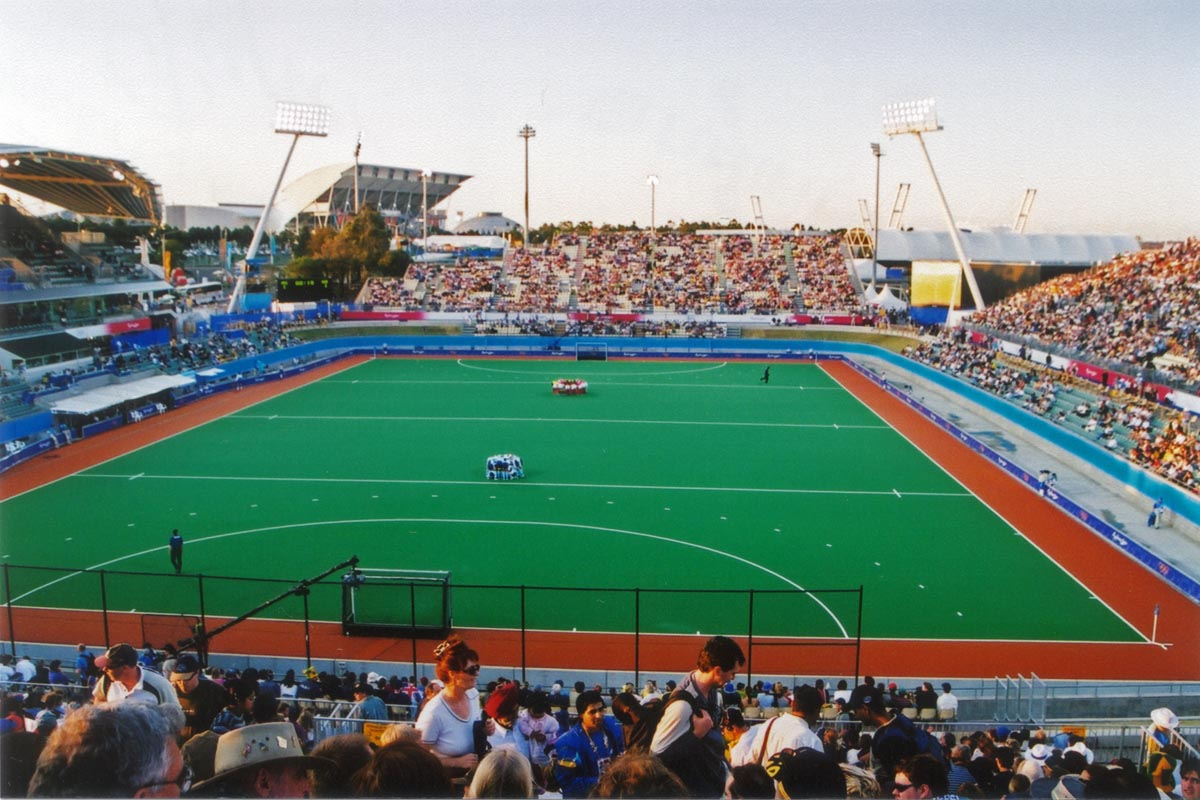
Sydney Olympic Park Hockey Centre hosted field hockey at the 2000 Summer Olympics.

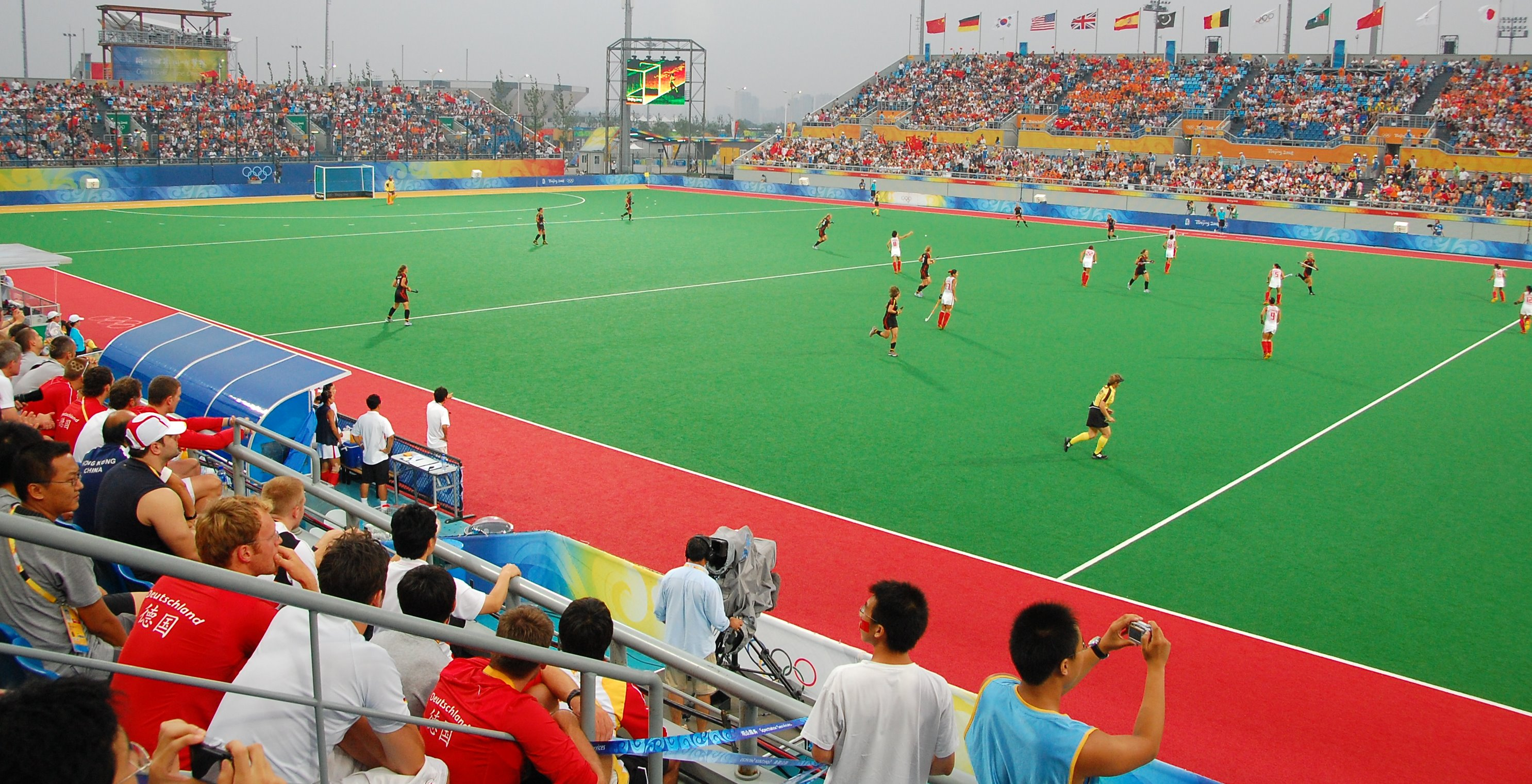
Olympic Green Hockey Field hosted field hockey at the 2008 Summer Olympics in Beijing.

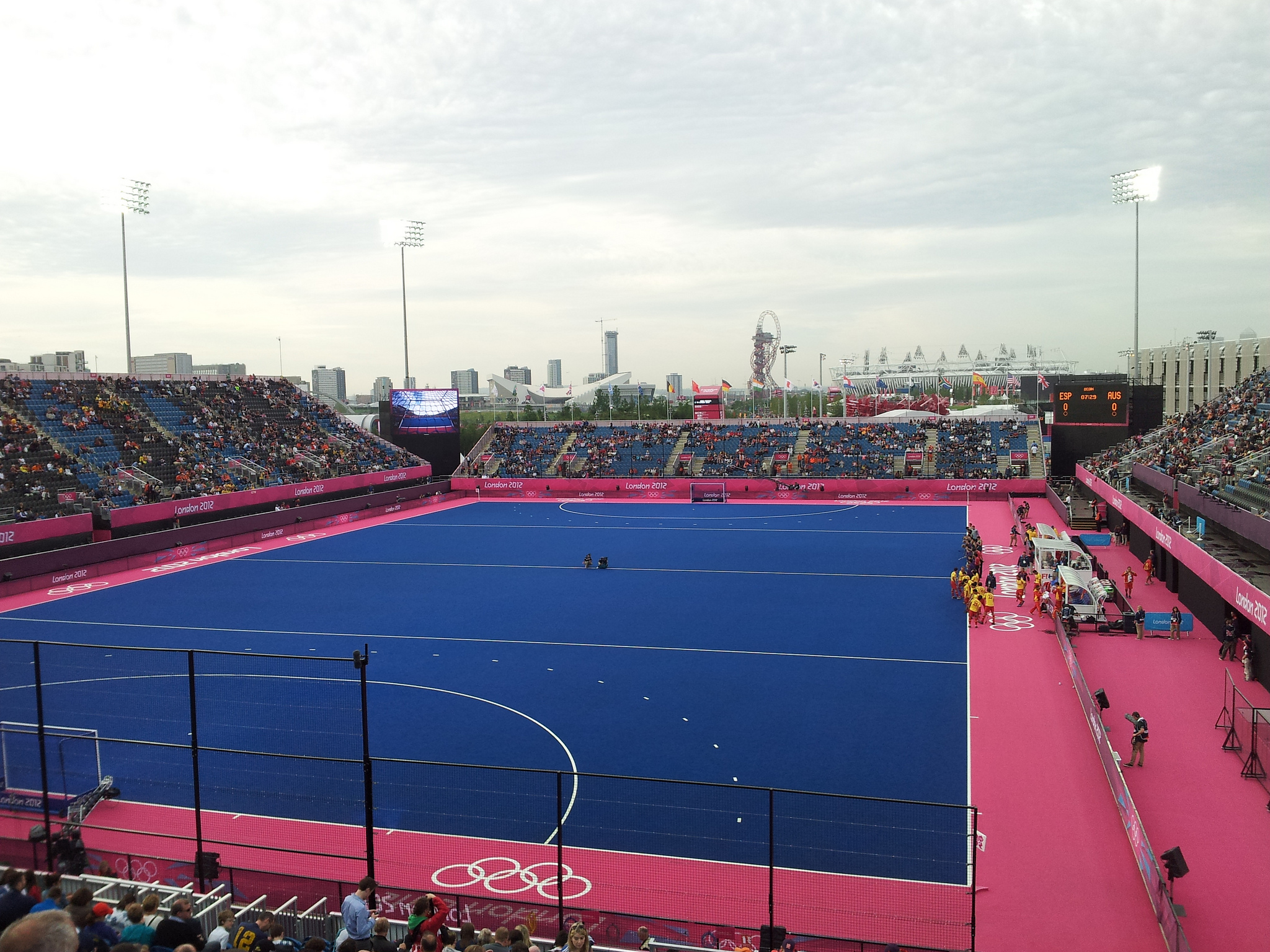
Riverbank Arena hosted the field hockey at the 2012 Summer Olympics in London. This was the first venue in which the sport was played on blue turf.

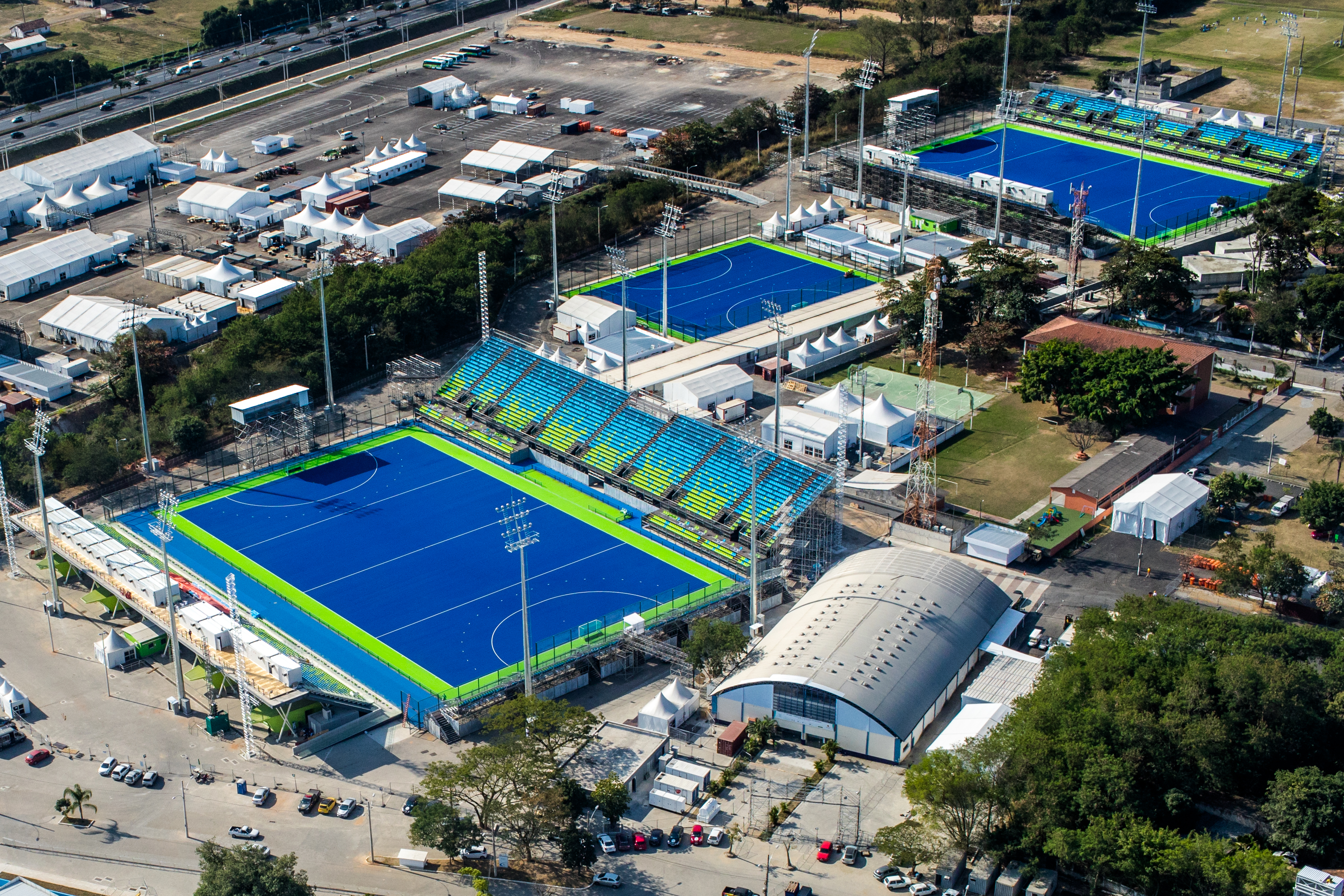
Olympic Hockey Centre hosted field hockey at the 2016 Summer Olympics in Rio de Janeiro.

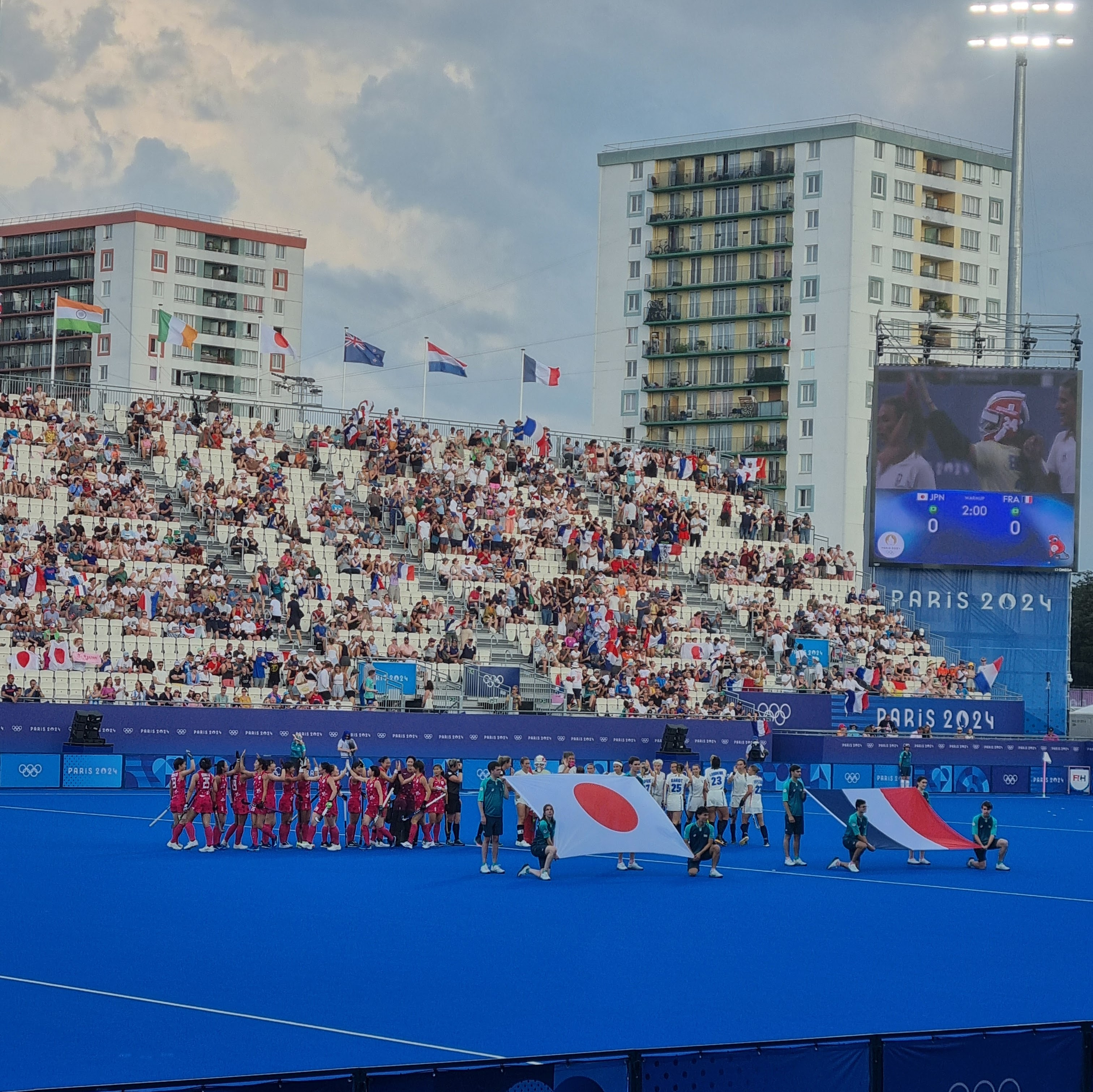
Stade Yves-du-Manoir hosted field hockey at the 2024 Summer Olympics in Paris.

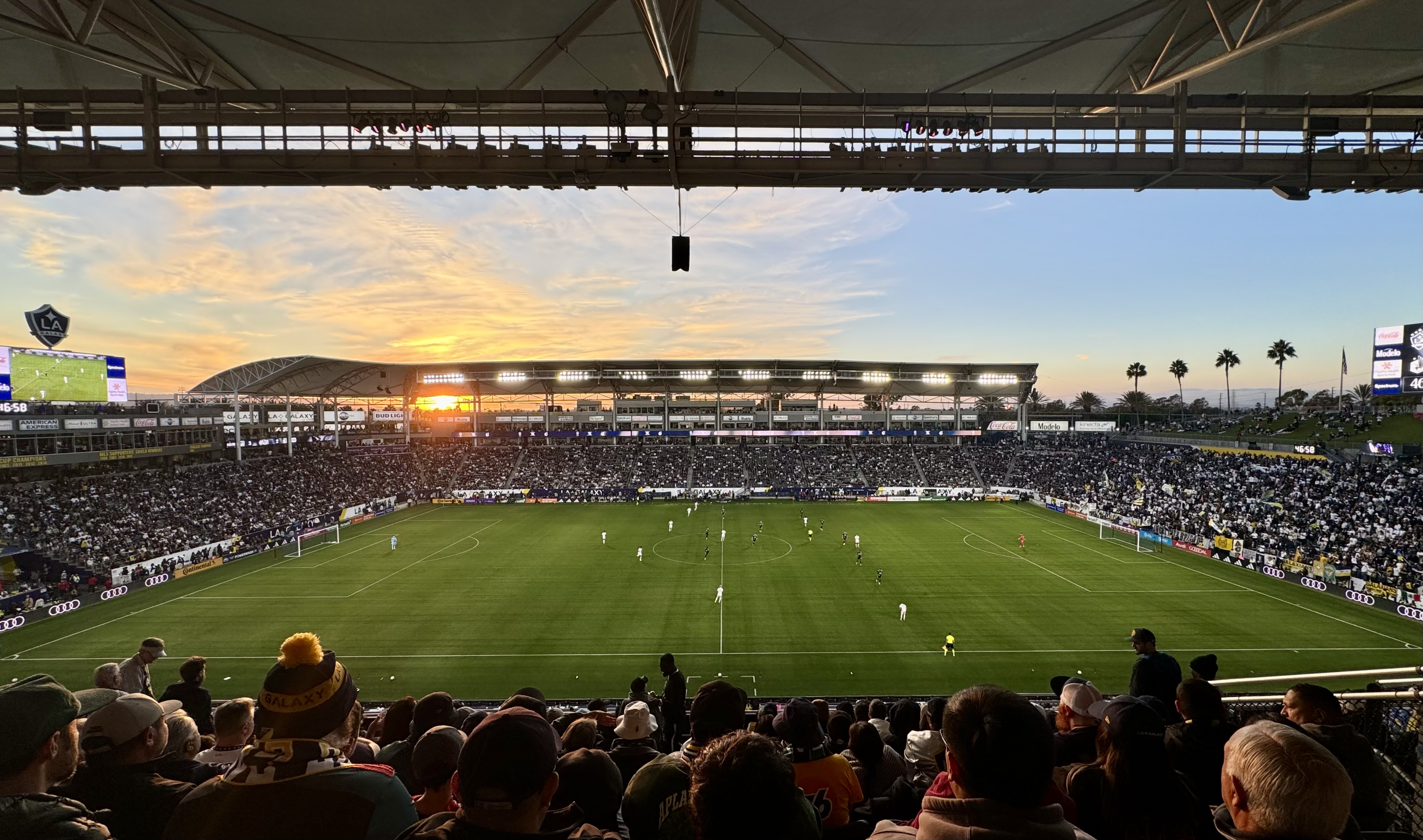
Dignity Health Sports Park will host field hockey at the 2028 Summer Olympics in Los Angeles.
