= Ziaulhaq =

Material witness

- Born: 1970 (age 55–56)
- Arrested: 2008-08-25; Chicago
- Citizenship: Afghanistan
- Detained at: a Chicago hotel
- Occupation: office clerk

Ziaulhaq is a citizen of Afghanistan who as of October 2009 has been held in the United States as a material witness since August 25, 2008.

Ziaulhaq and two other Afghans, Bashir Ahmad and Mohammad Rafi, accepted an invitation to come to a conference in the summer of 2008 in the United States that turned out to be a ploy to hold them in the US as potential witnesses against their employers. The three men worked for Afghan construction firms that are suspected of bribing American GIs. Since then they have shared a hotel suite in Chicago.

== Early life ==
Ziaulhaq had once trained as a veterinary assistant. He is married with six children.

== Employed by a firm with construction contracts on the American Air Base in Bagram ==
Ziaulhaq worked as an office clerk and driver for an Afghan construction firm. He was employed by the firm due to family ties.

== Apprehension by US officials ==
Ziaulhaq, Bashir Ahmad, Mohammad Rafi, Assad John Ramin, and several other Afghans, received invitations to travel to a conference in Columbus, Ohio, dedicated to celebrating the successes of Operation Enduring Freedom. When the Afghans arrived in the US they were taken into custody. Assad John Ramin, and other more senior members of the Afghan construction firms, face bribery charges.

Ziaulhaq, Bashir Ahmad, and Mohammad Rafi, the three Afghans who didn't face charges, were classed as material witnesses, and detained as flight risks. They were equipped with electronic monitoring cuffs, and required to report in on a daily basis. They receive an $88 a day per diem.

== Bribery case ==
Air Force Master Sergeant Patrick W. Boyd, Major Christopher P. West and a third GI pleaded guilty shortly after the Afghans were apprehended. Afghans who faced charges include: Abdul Qudoos Bahkshi, Noor Alam, Tahir Ramin. Prosecutors said Boyd accepted $130,000, and that West accepted between $400,000 and $1 million.

In October, 2009, Ziaulhaq testified. The Washington Post described him as "gaunt", and stated he testified for two hours. He testified he had no knowledge of kickbacks, and that he had no signing authority or other responsibilities in the finances of the firm he worked for. Under cross examination by the contractors' defense counself he was asked to confirm an estimate that during the fourteen months he had been held as a material witness the prosecution may have spent $60,000 to $70,000 on his per diem, travel and other expenses associated with his detention. He replied: "I don't understand what the problem with this is," Ziaulhaq testified. "I didn't ask to be here. If it was up to me, I would return to my country."
