= Thelma Turner =

New Zealand netball player (1929–2023)

Personal information
- Full name: Thelma Mary Turner (Née: Trask)
- Born: 31 May 1929 Hāwera, New Zealand
- Died: 26 September 2023 (aged 94) Palmerston North, New Zealand
- Height: 1.56 m (5 ft 1 in)
- Spouse: Bruce Turner (m. 1956; died 2010)
- School: Palmerston North Technical College

Netball career
- Playing position: GS
Years	National team	Caps
1948	New Zealand	1

Thelma Mary Turner (née Trask; 31 May 1929 – 26 September 2023) was a New Zealand netball player. She played as goal shoot in the New Zealand team in the second Test match against the touring Australian team in 1948.

== Early life ==
Turner was born Thelma Mary Trask on 31 May 1929, and grew up in Hāwera and then Palmerston North. She was educated at Palmerston North Technical College, where she was girls' joint athletics champion in 1944.

== Netball career ==
Trask was a member of the Manawatu provincial netball team from 1944, playing in the forward third of the court. She was also a Manawatu basketball representative from 1944.

At the 1946 national netball championships in Tauranga, Manawatu shared the national title with Auckland, each winning six of their seven matches, with Trask reported as giving a "bright scoring display". At the conclusion of the tournament, Trask was included in the North Island team that defeated the South Island 22–19 in the interisland match.

In 1948, Trask was selected in the New Zealand national team for the second Test against the touring Australian team in New Plymouth. The Australian team was victorious, winning 44–13. The match was the only occasion on which Trask represented New Zealand, because the New Zealand side for the three-Test series was selected on a regional basis, and New Zealand did not play another international game until 1960. With a height of 1.56 metres (5 ft 1 in), Trask is one of the shortest women ever to play for the Silver Ferns.

Trask retired as from playing netball and basketball in 1956.

== Later life and death ==
In 1956, Trask married Bruce Turner, a New Zealand field hockey player at the 1956 and 1960 Olympic Games, and Central Districts cricket representative. The couple went on to have three children. Bruce Turner died in 2010.

In 2019, Thelma Turner appeared at a netball Test match between New Zealand and Trinidad and Tobago in Palmerston North, tossing the coin before the start of the game.

Turner died in Palmerston North on 26 September 2023, at the age of 94.
