= Jacques Rémy =

Jacques Rémy can refer to:

- Jacques Rémy (field hockey) (born 1935), a Belgian Olympic hockey player
- Jacques Rémy (footballer) (born 1972), a French footballer
- Jacques Rémy (writer) (1911-1981), a French writer
