= Usoz =

Usoz is a surname. Notable people with the surname include:

- Luis Usoz (1932–1992), Spanish field hockey player
- Pablo Usoz (born 1968), Spanish field hockey player
