= Kanbe =

Kanbe (written: 神戸 or かんべ in hiragana) is a Japanese surname. Notable people with the surname include:

- Akira Kanbe (かんべ あきら), Japanese manga artist
- Mamoru Kanbe (神戸 守, born 1962), Japanese anime director
- Masaru Kanbe (神戸 勝, born 1938), Japanese field hockey player
- Miyuki Kanbe (神戸 みゆき, 1984–2008), Japanese actress, model and singer
- Musashi Kanbe (かんべ むさし, born 1948), Japanese writer
- Ranko Kanbe (神戸 蘭子, born 1982), Japanese fashion model, television personality and singer
