= Bill Schaefer =

Bill Schaefer or Schaeffer may refer to:

- Bill Schaefer (field hockey) (1925–2003), New Zealand field hockey player
- William Donald Schaefer (1921–2011), American politician
- Charles William Schaeffer (1813–1896), American politician
- Billy Schaeffer (born 1951), American basketball player
- Bill Schaefer (pole vaulter) (born 1918), American pole vaulter, 1941 All-American for the USC Trojans track and field team
