= Tullio Marchiori =

Italian hockey player (born 1942)

Personal information
- Nationality: Italian
- Born: 17 August 1942 (age 83) Rome, Italy

Sport
- Sport: Field hockey

Tullio Marchiori (born 17 August 1942) is an Italian field hockey player. He competed in the men's tournament at the 1960 Summer Olympics.
