= Jesper Guldbrandsen =

Danish hockey player

Personal information
- Nationality: Danish
- Born: 25 November 1935 (age 90) Copenhagen, Denmark

Sport
- Sport: Field hockey

Jesper Guldbrandsen (born 25 November 1935) is a Danish field hockey player. He competed in the men's tournament at the 1960 Summer Olympics.
