= Pedro Amat =

Spanish field hockey player (born 1940)

Olympic medal record

Men's Field Hockey
Bronze medal – third place	1960 Rome	Team competition

Pedro Amat Fontanals (born 13 July 1940) is a former Spanish field hockey player. He captured the bronze medal with the Men's National Team at the 1960 Summer Olympics in Rome, Italy.
