= Jean-Pierre Windal =

French field hockey player

Personal information
- Nationality: French
- Born: 9 December 1936 Paris, France
- Died: 23 August 2009 (aged 72) Saint-Brieuc, France

Sport
- Sport: Field hockey

Jean-Pierre Marie Andre Luc Windal (9 December 1936 – 23 August 2009) was a French field hockey player. He competed in the men's tournament at the 1960 Summer Olympics.
