= Joaquín Dualde =

Spanish field hockey player (1932–2012)

- Born: 14 November 1932; Barcelona, Spain
- Died: 28 April 2012 (aged 79)
- Occupation: field hockey player
- Relatives: Eduardo Dualde (brother); Ignacio Macaya (cousin)

Olympic medal record

Men's field hockey

Representing Spain
| Bronze medal – third place | 1960 Rome | Team competition |

Joaquín Dualde Santos de Lamadrid (14 November 1932 in Barcelona – 28 April 2012) was a Spanish field hockey player who competed in the 1960 Summer Olympics. His younger brother Eduardo Dualde and cousin Ignacio Macaya were also international hockey players.
