= Stuart Mayes =

British hockey player

Personal information
- Born: 6 March 1937 (age 89) Edmonton, London, England

Sport
- Sport: Field hockey
- Position: Forward
Senior career
Years	Team	Caps	Goals
1958–1960	University of Cambridge	-	-
1960–1963	Cheam	-	-
National team
Years	Team	Caps	Goals
–	Great Britain		-
–	England		-

Stuart David Mayes (born 6 March 1937) is a British field hockey player who competed at the 1960 Summer Olympics.

== Biography ==
Mayes played for Cheam Hockey Club and Cambridge University while studying engineering there. He was capped and scored the winning goal for England on 26 March 1960 against Wales.

Mayes represented Great Britain in the field hockey tournament at the 1960 Olympic Games in Rome.

After the Olympics he gained a position in London as an engineer but continued to play hockey with Cheam and England.
