= Francisco Caballer =

Spanish field hockey player (1932–2011)

Personal information
- Full name: Francisco Cavaller Soteras
- Born: 14 October 1932 Barcelona, Spain
- Died: 4 September 2011 (aged 78)
Medal record
Men's field hockey
Representing Spain
Olympic Games
Bronze medal – third place	1960 Rome	Team competition

Francisco Caballer Soteras (Note: In this Spanish name, the first or paternal surname is Caballer and the second or maternal family name is Soteras.) (14 October 1932 – 4 September 2011) was a Spanish field hockey player, who won the bronze medal with the Men's National Team at the 1960 Summer Olympics in Rome, Italy.
