= Antonio Lenza =

Italian field hockey player (1939–2024)

Personal information
- Nationality: Italian
- Born: 11 October 1939 Cagliari, Italy
- Died: 4 February 2024 (aged 84)

Sport
- Sport: Field hockey

Antonio Lenza (11 October 1939 – 4 February 2024) was an Italian field hockey player. He competed in the men's tournament at the 1960 Summer Olympics.
