= Frederick Scott (field hockey) =

British field hockey player (1933–2017)

Fred Scott
Personal information
- Born: 29 November 1933 Bombay, British India
- Died: 20 September 2017 (aged 83) Brackley, England

Sport
- Sport: Field hockey
- Position: Inside-left
Senior career
Years	Team	Caps	Goals
1956–1963	Royal Air Force	-	-
National team
Years	Team	Caps	Goals
–	Great Britain		-
–	Scotland		-

Frederick Hugh Scott (29 November 1933 – 20 September 2017) was a British field hockey player. He competed at the 1956 Summer Olympics and the 1960 Summer Olympics.

== Biography ==
Scott represented Scotland at national level and served in the Royal Air Force.

Scott represented Great Britain in the field hockey tournament at the 1956 Olympic Games in Melbourne.

Scott represented the Great Britain team again in the field hockey tournament at the 1960 Olympic Games in Rome.

Scott died in Brackley on 20 September 2017, at the age of 83.
