= Kenji Iijima =

Japanese hockey player

Personal information
- Nationality: Japanese
- Born: 2 February 1935 (age 91) Kanagawa, Japan

Sport
- Sport: Field hockey

Kenji Iijima (born 2 January 1935) is a Japanese field hockey player. He competed in the men's tournament at the 1960 Summer Olympics.
