= Donald Currie (field hockey) =

Australian field hockey player

Personal information
- Nationality: Australian
- Born: 6 March 1935 (age 91) Brisbane, Australia

Sport
- Sport: Field hockey

Donald Currie (born 6 March 1935) is an Australian field hockey player. He competed in the men's tournament at the 1960 Summer Olympics.
