= Ignacio Macaya =

Spanish field hockey player (1933–2006)

Olympic medal record

Men's field hockey

Representing Spain
Bronze medal – third place	1960 Rome	Team competition

Ignacio Macaya Santos de Lamadrid (2 December 1933 in Barcelona – 5 September 2006 in Barcelona) was a Spanish field hockey player who competed in the 1960 Summer Olympics and in the 1964 Summer Olympics. His cousins Joaquín Dualde and Eduardo Dualde were also international hockey players.
