= Carlos del Coso =

Spanish field hockey player (1933–2026)

Medal record

Men's field hockey

Representing Spain

Olympic Games
Bronze medal – third place	1960 Rome	Team competition

Carlos del Coso Iglesias (Note: In this Spanish name, the first or paternal surname is del Coso and the second or maternal family name is Iglesias.) (24 April 1933 – 10 July 2026) was a Spanish field hockey player who competed in the 1960 Summer Olympics, in the 1964 Summer Olympics, and in the 1968 Summer Olympics.

Coso died on 10 July 2026, at the age of 93.
