= Hiroshi Kojima =

Japanese field hockey player

Personal information
- Nationality: Japanese
- Born: 27 January 1938 (age 88) Hiroshima, Japan

Sport
- Sport: Field hockey

Hiroshi Kojima (born 27 January 1938) is a Japanese field hockey player. He competed in the men's tournament at the 1960 Summer Olympics.
