= Juan Calzado =

Spanish field hockey player (born 1937)

Olympic medal record

Men's field hockey
Bronze medal – third place	1960 Rome	Team competition

Juan Angel Calzado de Castro (born 16 March 1937) is a former field hockey player from Spain, who captured the bronze medal with the Men's National Team at the 1960 Summer Olympics in Rome, Italy. Later on, he became the president of the International Hockey Federation (FIH).
