= Sergio Ballesio =

Italian field hockey player (1934–2021)

Personal information
- Nationality: Italian
- Born: 15 September 1934 Rome, Italy
- Died: 16 March 2021 (aged 86) Rome, Italy

Sport
- Sport: Field hockey

Sergio Ballesio (15 September 1934 – 16 March 2021) was an Italian field hockey player. He competed in the men's tournament at the 1960 Summer Olympics.
