= José Dinarés =

Spanish field hockey player (born 1940)

Olympic medal record

Men's field hockey

Representing Spain
Bronze medal – third place	1960 Rome	Team competition

José Dinarés (born 5 June 1940) is a Spanish former field hockey player who competed in the 1960 Summer Olympics, in the 1964 Summer Olympics, and in the 1968 Summer Olympics. He was born in Terrassa.
