= Kurt von Arx =

Swiss hockey player

Personal information
- Nationality: Swiss
- Born: 14 February 1937 (age 89) Salzburg, Austria

Sport
- Sport: Field hockey

Kurt von Arx (born 14 February 1937) is a Swiss field hockey player. He competed in the men's tournament at the 1960 Summer Olympics.
