= Guy Debbaudt =

Belgian field hockey player (1936–2025)

Personal information
- Nationality: Belgian
- Born: 18 May 1936 Woluwe-Saint-Pierre, Belgium
- Died: September 2025 (aged 89) Brazil

Sport
- Sport: Field hockey

Guy Debbaudt (18 May 1936 – September 2025) was a Belgian field hockey player. He competed in the men's tournament at the 1960 Summer Olympics.

Debbaudt died in September 2025 in Brazil, at the age of 89.
