= Rafael Egusquiza =

Spanish field hockey player (1935–2017)

Olympic medal record

Men's field hockey

Representing Spain
Bronze medal – third place	1960 Rome	Team competition

Rafael de Egusquiza y Basterra (14 June 1935 – 1 June 2017) was a Spanish field hockey player who competed in the 1960 Summer Olympics. He was born in Bilbao.
