= Scott Hobson (field hockey) =

New Zealand field hockey player

Scott Helmore Hobson (born 7 April 1967 in Christchurch) is a former field hockey player from New Zealand, who finished in eighth position with the Men's National Team, nicknamed Black Sticks, at the 1992 Summer Olympics in Barcelona, Spain.

His father, Noel Hobson, represented New Zealand in field hockey at the 1956 and 1960 Olympic Games.
