= Patrick W. Boyd =

US Air Force officer

- Criminal charges: bribery
- Penalty: 40 months in prison

Patrick W. Boyd is an Air Force Master Sergeant who pleaded guilty to accepting bribes when he served in Afghanistan. Prosecutors estimated he accepted $130,000 in bribes from Afghan contractors. Major Christopher P. West also faced bribery charges. The two men were arrested on August 26 and August 27, 2008. Four Afghans who were alleged to have been among those who issued the bribes were tricked into entering the US on August 25, 2008.

Boyd, West, and another GI Charles W. Patton, pled guilty in June 2009. The bribery took place when Boyd and West were deployed to Afghanistan in 2004 and 2005. Patton, who wasn't deployed to Afghanistan, pleaded guilty to receiving and hiding cash from West. In October 2009 Sergeant Ana C. Chavez, who served at the base in 2005–2006, pleaded guilty to taking US$90,000 in bribe payments.

The men accused of bribery were: Assad John Ramin and Tahir Ramin, of AZ Corporation and Top's Construction, brothers who were joint citizens of Afghanistan and the USA; Noor Alam, owner of Northern Reconstruction Organization; and Abdul Qudoos Bakhshi of Naweed Bakhshi Company.

In December 2011 Boyd was sentenced to 40 months in prison, one year of supervised release, and $130,000 in restitution.
