= Willy Kristoffersen =

Danish hockey player

Personal information
- Nationality: Danish
- Born: 18 October 1933 (age 93) Slagelse, Denmark

Sport
- Sport: Field hockey

Willy Kristoffersen (born 18 October 1933) is a Danish field hockey player. He competed in the men's tournament at the 1960 Summer Olympics.
