= Pedro Roig =

Spanish field hockey player (1938–2018)

Olympic medal record

Men's field hockey

Representing Spain
Bronze medal – third place	1960 Rome	Team competition

Pedro Roig (22 December 1938 – 22 November 2018) was a Spanish field hockey player who competed in the 1960 Summer Olympics. He was born in Terrassa.
