= Jacques Mauchien =

French field hockey player

Personal information
- Nationality: French
- Born: 9 June 1926 Brussels, Belgium
- Died: 31 August 1998 (aged 72)

Sport
- Sport: Field hockey

Jacques Mauchien (9 June 1926 – 31 August 1998) was a French field hockey player. He competed in the men's tournament at the 1960 Summer Olympics.
