= Eduardo Dualde =

Spanish field hockey player (1933–1989)

Medal record

Men's field hockey

Representing Spain

Olympic Games
Bronze medal – third place	1960 Rome	Team competition

Eduardo Dualde Santos de Lamadrid (Note: In this Spanish name, the first or paternal surname is Dualde and the second or maternal family name is Santos de Lamadrid.) (1 December 1933 in Barcelona – 12 June 1989 in Tortosa) was a Spanish field hockey player who competed in the 1960 Summer Olympics and in the 1964 Summer Olympics. His elder brother Joaquín Dualde and cousin Ignacio Macaya were also international hockey players.
