= Masaru Kanbe =

Japanese hockey player

Personal information
- Nationality: Japanese
- Born: 30 October 1938 (age 87) Aichi, Japan

Sport
- Sport: Field hockey

Masaru Kanbe (神戸 勝, Kanbe Masaru; born 30 October 1938) is a Japanese field hockey player. He competed in the men's tournament at the 1960 Summer Olympics.
