= Govind Sawant =

Indian field hockey player (1935–2001)

Medal record

Men's field hockey

Representing India

Olympic Games
| Silver medal – second place | 1960 Rome | Team |

Govind Sawant (28 November 1935 – 8 September 2001) was an Indian field hockey player. He was born in Gujarat. He won a silver medal at the 1960 Summer Olympics in Rome.
