= Bill Schaefer (field hockey) =

New Zealand field hockey player

Personal information
- Full name: William Paul Schaefer
- Born: 9 October 1925 Masterton, New Zealand
- Died: 20 July 2003 (aged 77)
- Height: 1.73 m (5 ft 8 in)
- Weight: 74 kg (163 lb)

Sport
- Country: New Zealand
- Sport: Field hockey
- Position: Goalkeeper

William Paul Schaefer (9 October 1925 – 20 July 2003) was a New Zealand field hockey player. He represented New Zealand in field hockey between 1956 and 1964, including at the 1956, 1960 and 1964 Olympic Games.
