= Bruce Turner (field hockey) =

New Zealand field hockey player and cricketer

Personal information
- Full name: Bruce Alexander Turner
- Born: 5 August 1930 Palmerston North, New Zealand
- Died: 30 March 2010 (aged 79) Palmerston North, New Zealand
- Height: 1.75 m (5 ft 9 in)
- Spouse: Thelma Trask (m. 1956)

Sport
- Country: New Zealand
- Sport: Field hockey; Cricket
- Cricket career

Cricket information
- Batting: Right-handed
- Role: Batsman

Domestic team information
- Years: Team
- 1951/52–1955/56: Central Districts
- FC debut: 11 January 1952 Central Districts v Otago
- Last FC: 20 January 1956 Central Districts v Canterbury

Career statistics
Competition	First-class
Matches	15
Runs scored	490
Batting average	19.60
100s/50s	0/3
Top score	66
Catches/stumpings	24/–
- Source: CricketArchive, 5 October 2024

Bruce Alexander Turner (5 August 1930 – 30 March 2010) was a New Zealand field hockey player and cricketer.

He represented New Zealand in field hockey between 1950 and 1962, including at the 1956 Olympic Games in Melbourne and the 1960 Olympic Games in Rome. He represented Manawatu in hockey, and in 1976, when New Zealand won the Olympic gold medal, he was one of the national selectors.

He played 15 first-class cricket matches as an opening batsman for Central Districts between 1952 and 1956. He also represented Manawatu in the Hawke Cup from 1952 to 1968.

In 1956, Turner married netballer Thelma Trask, who represented New Zealand in 1948, and the couple had three children. Bruce Turner died on 30 March 2010.
