= Luis Usoz =

Spanish field hockey player (1932–1992)

Olympic medal record

Men's field hockey

Representing Spain
| Bronze medal – third place | 1960 Rome | Team competition |

Luis Usoz Quintana (19 October 1932 in San Sebastián – 10 March 1992) was a Spanish field hockey player who competed in the 1960 Summer Olympics and in the 1964 Summer Olympics. He was the father of fellow international and Olympic hockey player Pablo Usoz.
