= Flemming Kristiansen =

Danish field hockey player

Personal information
- Nationality: Danish
- Born: 9 November 1940 (age 85) Kalundborg, Denmark

Sport
- Sport: Field hockey

Flemming Kristiansen (born 9 November 1940) is a Danish field hockey player. He competed in the men's tournament at the 1960 Summer Olympics.
