= Joseph Antic =

Indian field hockey player (1931–2016)

Medal record

Representing India

Men's Field hockey

Olympic Games
Silver medal – second place	1960 Rome	Team

Asian Games
Silver medal – second place	1962 Jakarta	Team

Joseph "Joe" Anthony Antic (13 March 1931 – 12 July 2016) was an Indian field hockey player. He was born in Secunderabad. He won a silver medal at the 1960 Summer Olympics in Rome.
