= Laxmi Kanta Das =

Indian weightlifter (born 1938)

Personal information
- Nationality: Indian
- Born: 1 July 1938 (age 87); Calcutta, West Bengal, India
- Died: June 23 2025 (age 86)

Sport
- Sport: Weightlifting

Laxmi Kanta Das (born 1 November 1938) is an Indian weightlifter. He competed at the 1960 Summer Olympics and the 1964 Summer Olympics. He was conferred with the Arjuna Award in the year 1962 by the Government of India.
