= Wim de Beer =

Dutch hockey player

Personal information
- Nationality: Dutch
- Born: 30 August 1932 Tilburg, Netherlands
- Died: 9 July 2008 (aged 75) Tilburg, Netherlands

Sport
- Sport: Field hockey

Wim de Beer (30 August 1932 – 9 July 2008) was a Dutch field hockey player. He competed in the men's tournament at the 1960 Summer Olympics.
