= Guy McGregor =

New Zealander field hockey player

Personal information
- Full name: Guy Dalrymple McGregor
- Born: 11 July 1930 (age 95) Whangārei, New Zealand
- Height: 1.73 m (5 ft 8 in)
- Weight: 75 kg (165 lb)

Sport
- Country: New Zealand
- Sport: Field hockey

Guy Dalrymple McGregor (born 11 July 1930) is a former New Zealand field hockey player. He represented New Zealand in field hockey between 1952 and 1962, including the 1956 Olympic Games in Melbourne and 1960 Olympic Games in Rome.

McGregor was educated at Gisborne Boys' High School and the University of Otago, where he studied physical education. He became a schoolteacher, and later was head lecturer in physical education and health at Auckland Teachers' College. In 2011, he was inducted into the Tairawhiti Legend of Sport Hall of Fame in Gisborne.
