= Seiji Kihara (field hockey) =

Japanese hockey player

Personal information
- Nationality: Japanese
- Born: 15 January 1941 (age 85) Hiroshima, Japan

Sport
- Sport: Field hockey

Seiji Kihara (born 15 January 1941) is a Japanese field hockey player. He competed at the 1960 Summer Olympics and the 1964 Summer Olympics.
