= Roger Zanetti =

Swiss field hockey player

Personal information
- Nationality: Swiss
- Born: 16 July 1930 Yverdon-les-Bains, Switzerland
- Died: 13 January 2014 (aged 83)

Sport
- Sport: Field hockey

Roger Zanetti (16 July 1930 – 13 January 2014) was a Swiss field hockey player. He competed at the 1952 Summer Olympics and the 1960 Summer Olympics.
