= Noel Hobson =

New Zealand field hockey player (1934–2025)

Personal information
- Full name: Noel Helmore Hobson
- Born: 15 July 1934 Christchurch, New Zealand
- Died: October 22, 2025 (aged 91) Christchurch, New Zealand
- Children: Scott Hobson

Sport
- Country: New Zealand
- Sport: Field hockey

Noel Helmore Hobson (15 July 1934 – 22 October 2025) was a New Zealand field hockey player. He represented New Zealand in field hockey between 1955 and 1963, including at the 1956 Olympic Games in Melbourne and the 1960 Olympic Games in Rome.

His son, Scott Hobson, represented New Zealand in field hockey at the 1992 Olympic Games.

Hobson died on 22 October 2025 in Christchurch, at the age of 91.
