= Campo Tre Fontane =

Sports venue in Rome, Italy

Campo Tre Fontane is a sports venue located in Rome, Italy. For the 1960 Summer Olympics, it hosted seven field hockey matches.

The camp is part of the Tre Fontane Sports Zone, and is home to S.S. Lazio Hockey Prato.
