= Phil Bygrave =

New Zealand field hockey player

Personal information
- Born: Phillip George Bygrave; 19 September 1929 Te Aroha, New Zealand
- Died: 24 October 2012 (aged 83) Auckland, New Zealand
- Height: 1.82 m (6 ft 0 in)
- Weight: 73 kg (161 lb)

Sport
- Country: New Zealand
- Sport: Field hockey

Phillip George Bygrave (19 September 1929 – 24 October 2012) was a New Zealand field hockey player. He represented New Zealand in field hockey between 1954 and 1964, including at the 1956, 1960, and 1964 Olympic Games.
