= Jan Willem van Erven Dorens =

Dutch field hockey player (born 1934)

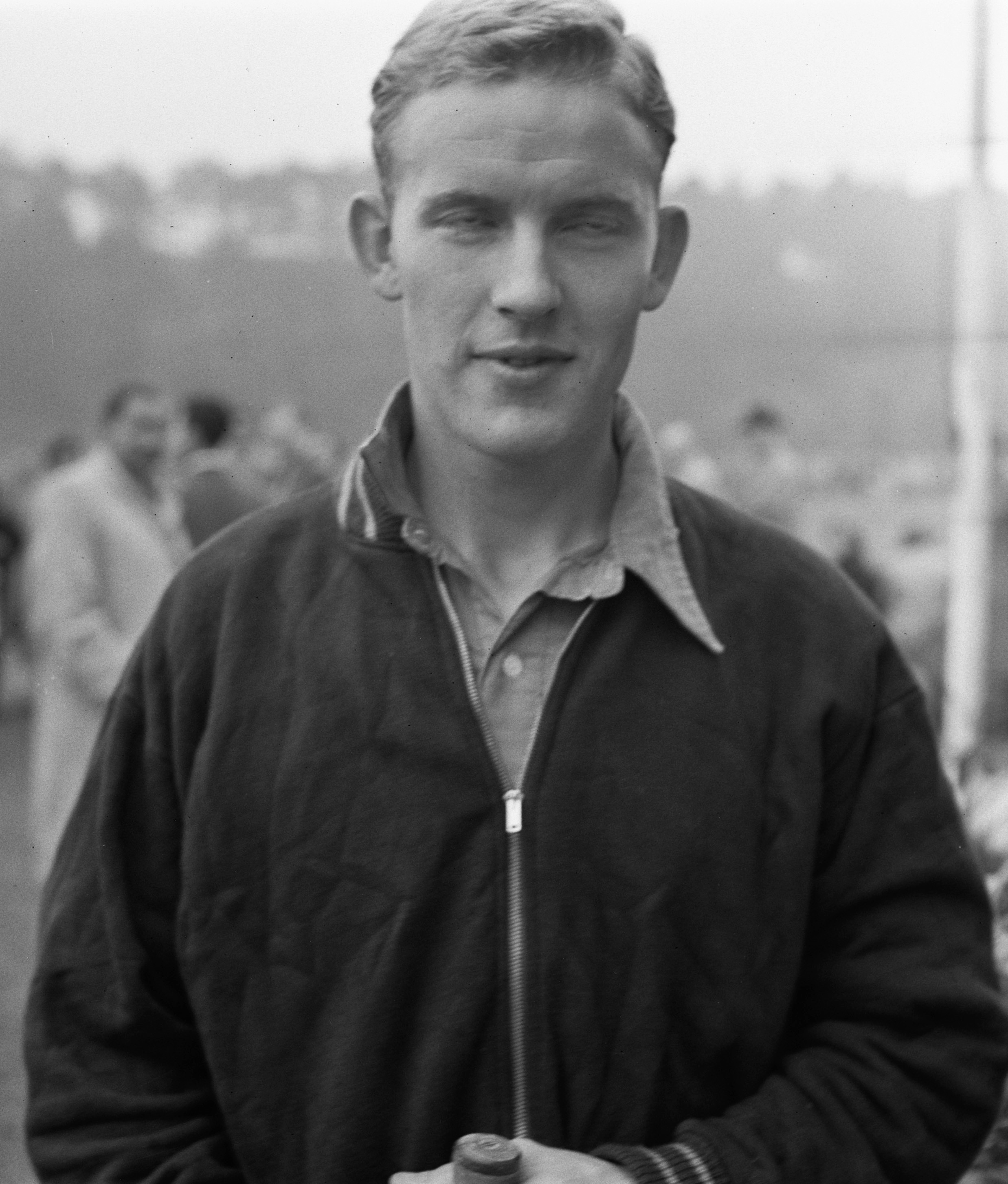
- Jan Willem van Erven Dorens in 1956

Personal information
- Born: 8 November 1934 (age 91) Amsterdam, Netherlands
- Height: 1.83 m (6 ft 0 in)
- Weight: 80 kg (180 lb)

Sport
- Sport: Field hockey
- Club: Laren

Jan Willem van Erven Dorens (born 8 November 1934) is a Dutch retired field hockey player. He competed at the 1960 Summer Olympics where his team finished in ninth place. He was the Olympic flag bearer for the Netherlands at those Games.

Van Erven Dorens has an elder sister, Marguérite, and a younger brother Robbie, an amateur golfer. Their father, Jan Frederik, was an architect, rower and hockey goalkeeper. He is the father of television presenter and actor Beau.
