= Noor Alam =

Pakistani field hockey player (1929–2003)

Personal information
- Born: 5 December 1929 Talagang, Punjab, British India
- Died: 30 June 2003 (aged 73) Rawalpindi, Punjab, Pakistan
- Resting place: Alif Shah Graveyard, Rawalpindi, Punjab, Pakistan
Medal record
Men's field hockey
Representing Pakistan
Olympic Games
Gold medal – first place	1960 Rome	Team competition
Silver medal – second place	1956 Melbourne	Team competition
Asian Games
Gold medal – first place	1958 Tokyo	Team competition
Gold medal – first place	1962 Jakarta	Team competition

Noor Alam (5 December 1929 – 30 June 2003) was a field hockey player from Pakistan. He won gold medal at the 1960 Summer Olympics and a silver medal, the country's first Olympic medal, at the 1956 Summer Olympics. He was also a member of winning Pakistani team of 1958 and 1962 Asian Games.

== Death ==
He died on 30 June 2003 in Rawalpindi and was laid to rest in Alif Shah Graveyard in Cantt area of the metropolitan.
