= Jaswant Singh (field hockey) =

Indian field hockey player (1931–2022)

Medal record

Representing India

Men's Field hockey

Olympic Games
Silver medal – second place	1960 Rome	Team

Jaswant Singh (10 August 1931 – 14 January 2022) was an Indian field hockey player.

== Biography ==
He was born in Punjab, British Raj. He won a silver medal at the 1960 Summer Olympics in Rome. Singh suffered a heart attack in 2021 and died on 14 January 2022, at the age of 90.
