= Mervyn Crossman =

Australian field hockey player

Personal information
- Full name: Mervyn Richard Crossman
- Born: 7 April 1935 Home Hill, Queensland, Australia
- Died: 20 June 2017 (aged 82)
- Height: 175 cm (5 ft 9 in)

Sport
- Sport: Field hockey
Medal record
Men's field hockey
Representing Australia
Olympic Games
Bronze medal – third place	1964 Tokyo	Team competition

Mervyn Richard Crossman (7 April 1935 – 20 June 2017) was an Australian field hockey player, who won the bronze medal with the Men's National Team at the 1964 Summer Olympics in Tokyo, Japan. Four years earlier, when Rome, Italy hosted the Games, he made his Olympic debut.

Crossman played 32 times for Australia at the senior level, scoring 8 goals and was a renowned penalty corner hitter. He died in Townsville, Queensland on 20 June 2017.
