= Jacques Rémy (field hockey) =

Belgian field hockey player

Personal information
- Nationality: Belgian
- Born: 5 February 1936 (age 90) Ixelles, Belgium

Sport
- Sport: Field hockey

Jacques Rémy (born 5 February 1936) is a Belgian field hockey player. He competed at the 1960 Summer Olympics and the 1964 Summer Olympics.
