= Olympic Velodrome, Rome =

Sports venue in Rome, Italy

Coordinates: 41°49′35.93″N 12°27′24.83″E

Velodromo Olimpico
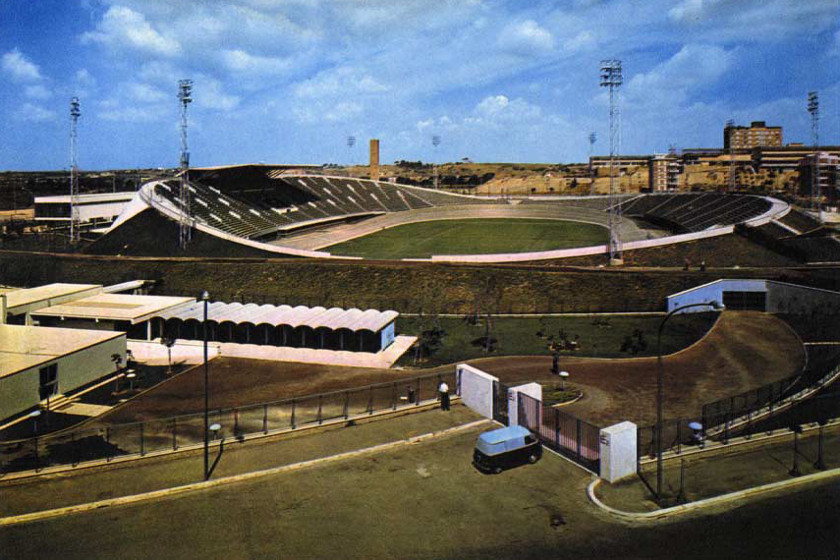
- Velodromo Olimpico, pictured in 1960
- Interactive map of Velodromo Olimpico
- Location: Viale della Tecnica / Viale dell'Oceano Pacifico; 00144 Roma
- Owner: CONI - Comune di Roma

Construction
- Groundbreaking: 10 August 1957
- Opened: 30 April 1960
- Closed: 1968
- Demolished: 24 July 2008
- Cost: £ 1.050.000.000
- Architects: Cesare Ligini, Dagoberto Ortensi, Silvano Ricci

The Olympic Velodrome (Italian: Velodromo Olimpico) was a sports venue located in Rome, Italy. Constructed for the 1960 Summer Olympics, it hosted the track cycling and field hockey events.

The velodrome was constructed between 1957 and early 1960. Soon after it was built problems were found, as water was draining away the foundations on one side of the velodrome. Concrete was injected into the foundations, which solved the problem only temporarily. It was last used for competition in 1968, when it hosted the UCI Track Cycling World Championships. After this it was abandoned, until it was imploded on 24 July 2008.

== See also ==
- List of cycling tracks and velodromes

Preceded by Olympic Stadium; Amsterdam	UCI Track Cycling World Championships; Venue; 1968	Succeeded by Sportpaleis; Antwerp
