= John Cullen (field hockey) =

New Zealand hockey player

Personal information
- Full name: John Cameron Cullen
- Born: 14 September 1937 (age 89) Greymouth, New Zealand

Sport
- Country: New Zealand
- Sport: Field hockey

John Cameron Cullen (born 14 September 1937) is a former field hockey player from New Zealand. He competed at the 1960 Summer Olympics and the 1964 Summer Olympics.
