= Swimming at the 1964 Summer Olympics – Men's 4 × 100 metre medley relay =

Men's 4 × 100 metre medley relay at the Games of the XVIII Olympiad
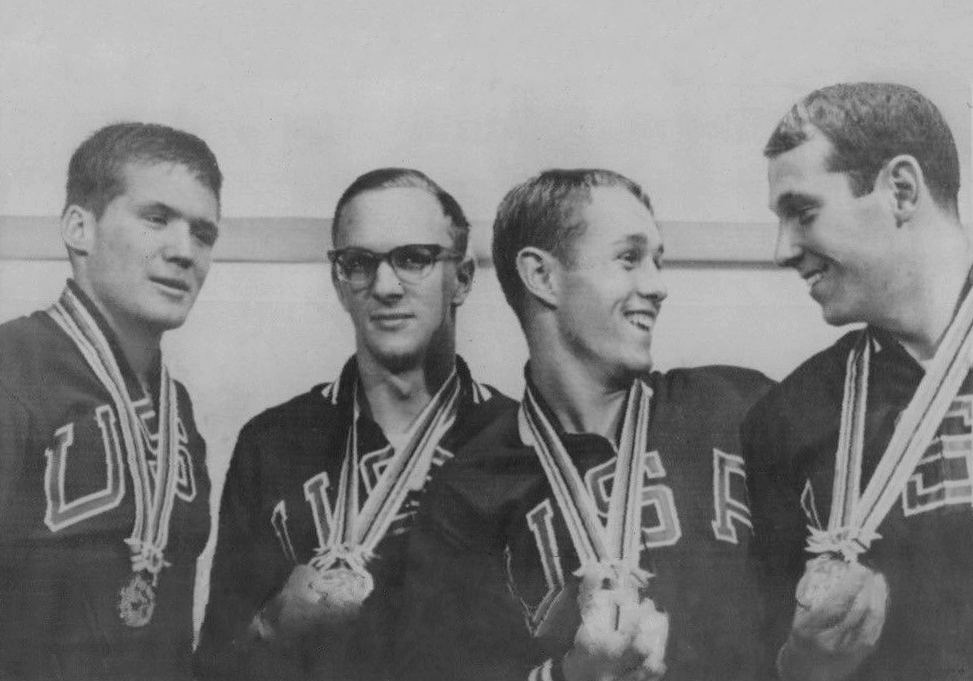
- Left-right: Steve Clark, Fred Schmidt, Bill Craig, Thompson Mann
- Venue: Yoyogi National Gymnasium
- Dates: 15 October 1964 (heats); 16 October 1964 (final)
- Competitors: 63 from 14 nations
- Teams: 14
- Winning time: 3:58.4 WR

Medalists
1st place, gold medalist(s)		Thompson Mann, Bill Craig, Fred Schmidt, Steve Clark, Rich McGeagh*, Virgil Luken*, Walter Richardson*, Bob Bennett*	United States
2nd place, silver medalist(s)		Ernst-Joachim Küppers, Egon Henninger, Horst-Günther Gregor, Hans-Joachim Klein	United Team of Germany
3rd place, bronze medalist(s)		Peter Reynolds, Ian O'Brien, Kevin Berry, David Dickson, Peter Tonkin* *Indicates the swimmer only competed in the preliminary heats.	Australia

The men's 4 × 100 metre medley relay event at the 1964 Olympic Games took place on October 15 (qualification) and October 16 (final). This swimming event uses medley swimming as a relay. Because an Olympic size swimming pool is 50 metres long, each of the four swimmers completed two lengths of the pool, each using a different stroke. The first on each team used the backstroke, the second used the breaststroke, the third used the butterfly stroke, and the final swimmer used freestyle (restricted to not allow any of the first three strokes to be used, though nearly all swimmers use front crawl regardless).

The first swimmer must touch the wall before the next can leave the starting block, and so forth; timing of the starts is thus important.

== Results ==
=== Heats ===
Heat 1

Place	Swimmers	Time	Notes
1	Ernst-Joachim Küppers, Egon Henninger, Horst-Günter Gregor, Hans-Joachim Klein (GER)	4:06.6	
2	Shigeo Fukushima, Kenji Ishikawa, Isao Nakajima, Yukiaki Okabe (JPN)	4:07.3	
3	Viktor Mazanov, Aleksandr Tutakayev, Valentin Kuzmin, Viktor Semchenkov (URS)	4:07.6	
4	Geoff Thwaites, Neil Nicholson, Brian Jenkins, Bobby McGregor (GBR)	4:12.3	
5	Jan Weeteling, Hemmie Vriens, Jan Jiskoot, Ron Kroon (NED)	4:12.6	
6	Athos de Oliveira Filho, Farid Zablith Filho, Mauri Fonseca, Álvaro Pires (BRA)	4:21.2	
7	Michael Eu, Cheah Tong Kim, Bernard Chan, Tan Thuan Heng (MAS)	4:29.3	

Heat 2

Place	Swimmers	Time	Notes
1	Rich McGeagh, Virg Luken, Walter Richardson, Bob Bennett (USA)	4:05.1	OR
2	József Csikány, Ferenc Lenkei, József Gulrich, Gyula Dobay (HUN)	4:08.8	
3	Dino Rora, Gian Corrado Gross, Giampiero Fossati, Pietro Boscaini (ITA)	4:09.3	
4	Peter Reynolds, Peter Tonkin, Kevin Berry, David Dickson (AUS)	4:11.4	
5	Ralph Hutton, Sandy Gilchrist, Daniel Sherry, Ron Jacks (CAN)	4:15.5	
6	Carlos van der Maath, Miguel Angel Navarro, Luis Nicolao, Alberto Bourdillón (ARG)	4:15.8	
7	Jesús Cabrera, Nazario Padrón, Joaquín Pujol, José Miguel Espinosa (ESP)	4:17.4	

=== Final ===
Place	Swimmers	Time	Notes
1	Thompson Mann, Bill Craig, Fred Schmidt, Steve Clark (USA)	3:58.4	WR
2	Ernst-Joachim Küppers, Egon Henninger, Horst-Günter Gregor, Hans-Joachim Klein (GER)	4:01.6	
3	Peter Reynolds, Ian O'Brien, Kevin Berry, David Dickson (AUS)	4:02.3	
4	Viktor Mazanov, Heorhiy Prokopenko, Valentin Kuzmin, Vladimir Shuvalov (URS)	4:04.2	
5	Shigeo Fukushima, Kenji Ishikawa, Isao Nakajima, Yukiaki Okabe (JPN)	4:06.6	
6	József Csikány, Ferenc Lenkei, József Gulrich, Gyula Dobay (HUN)	4:08.5	
7	Dino Rora, Gian Corrado Gross, Giampiero Fossati, Pietro Boscaini (ITA)	4:10.3	
8	Geoff Thwaites, Neil Nicholson, Brian Jenkins, Bobby McGregor (GBR)	4:11.4	
