= Richard McGeagh =

American swimmer (1944–2021)

Personal information
- Full name: Richard Michael McGeagh
- National team: United States
- Born: March 11, 1944 Los Angeles, California, U.S.
- Died: September 9, 2021 (aged 77) Hermitage, Tennessee, U.S.
- Occupation: Real Estate Appraiser
- Height: 6 ft 3 in (1.91 m)
- Weight: 185 lb (84 kg)
- Spouse: Barbara
- Children: 2

Sport
- Sport: Swimming
- Strokes: Backstroke
- Club: Los Angeles Athletic Club
- College team: University of Southern California
- Coach: Peter Daland (USC)
Medal record
Men's swimming
Representing the United States
Pan American Games
Gold medal – first place	1963 São Paulo	4×100 m medley

Richard Michael McGeagh (March 11, 1944 – September 9, 2021) was an American competition swimmer and water polo player who competed for the University of Southern California, and later worked as a real estate appraiser. He was best known for swimming the backstroke leg in Olympic record time for the U.S. team in the preliminary heats of the men's 4×100-meter medley relay at the 1964 Tokyo Olympics. With McGeagh's assistance, his U.S. 4x100 medley preliminary team won their heat but a separate four-person team later won the event final with a world record time of 3:58.4, capturing the gold medal. As McGeagh did not swim in the finals he was not eligible for an Olympic medal under the Olympic rules in place in 1964.

== Early life ==
McGeagh was born in Los Angeles on March 11, 1944. He attended Herbert Hoover High School in Glendale, where he won the 100-yard backstroke event at the CIF Southern Section championships in three consecutive years from 1960 to 1962. He also established the national high school record for that event in 1961, with a time of 51.8 seconds.

He went on to study at the University of Southern California from 1962 to 1967 under Hall of Fame USC Swim Coach Peter Daland. He was involved in swimming and water polo for the USC Trojans and received All-American honors in both sports. He won the 400-yard individual medley at the 1964 NCAA championships during his sophomore year.

== Swimming highlights ==
McGeagh participated in the 1963 Pan American Games, winning a gold medal in the 4×100 m medley relay. He was also part of the American team that established the long course world record of 4:00.1 in the same event at a meet in Osaka that year.

=== 1964 Tokyo Olympics ===
He took a semester off in order to train for the 1964 Summer Olympics in Tokyo. After qualifying at the U.S. trails, he was selected to compete in the preliminary heats of the men's 4×100 m medley relay. Although the 4x100 preliminary team of McGeagh on backstroke, Virgil Luken on breaststroke, Walter Richardson on butterfly, and Bob Bennett on freestyle anchor were described by the Associated Press as "a second‐string team", they established a new Olympic record of 4:05.1. McGeagh's time of 1:01.1 was also an Olympic record for the backstroke leg of the relay. He was ultimately omitted from the medal round and was consequently not awarded the gold medal. The finals team of Thompson Mann, Bill Craig, Fred Schmidt, and Steve Clark later set a world record in the finals of the 4x100-meter medley with a time of 3:58.4.

== Personal life and death ==
McGeagh was married to wife Barbara for 55 years until his death. Together, they had two children: Michael and Karin.

After retiring from competitive swimming, McGeagh became a real estate appraiser. He initially resided in La Crescenta-Montrose, California, before moving to the Nashville neighborhood of Hermitage, Tennessee, in 2013. He died of complications from COVID-19 in Hermitage on September 9, 2021, at the age of 77, during the COVID-19 pandemic in Tennessee.

== See also ==
- List of University of Southern California people
- World record progression 4 × 100 metres medley relay
