= Swimming at the 1963 Pan American Games – Men's 4 × 100 metre medley relay =

Men's 4 × 100 metre medley relay at the 1963 Pan American Games
- Venue: -

Medalists
Gold medal	Richard McGeagh, Bill Craig, Walter Richardson and Nicholas Kirby	United States
Silver medal	Carlos van der Maath, Alberto Pérez, Luis Nicolao and Abel Pepe	Argentina
Bronze medal	R. Camelet; John Kelso; Daniel Sherry; Sandy Gilchrist	Canada

The men's 4 × 100 metre medley relay competition of the swimming events at the 1963 Pan American Games took place on April. The defending Pan American Games champion is the United States.

== Results ==
All times are in minutes and seconds.

KEY:	q	Fastest non-qualifiers	Q	Qualified	GR	Games record	NR	National record	PB	Personal best	SB	Seasonal best

=== Final ===
The final was held on April.

Rank	Name	Nationality	Time	Notes
1st place, gold medalist(s)	Richard McGeagh; Bill Craig; Walter Richardson; Nicholas Kirby	United States	4:05.6	
2nd place, silver medalist(s)	Carlos van der Maath; Alberto Pérez; Luis Nicolao; Abel Pepe	Argentina	4:17.3	
3rd place, bronze medalist(s)	R. Camelet; John Kelso; Daniel Sherry; Sandy Gilchrist	Canada	4:17.5	
4	Athos de Oliveira; Farid Zablith Filho; Manuel dos Santos; Álvaro Pires	Brazil	4:20.3	
5	Enrique Rabell; R. Vargas; Mauricio Ocampo; B. Hernandez	Mexico	4:30.6	
6	G. Perrero; G. Marton; Gustavo Ocampo; A. Bellido	Peru	4:38.7	
7	- - - -	-	-	
8	- - - -	-	-	
