= Spain at the 1964 Summer Olympics =

- IOC code: ESP (SPA used at these Games)
- NOC: Spanish Olympic Committee

in Tokyo
- Competitors: 51 (48 men and 3 women) in 9 sports
- Flag bearer: Eduardo Dualde
- Medals: Gold 0 Silver 0 Bronze 0 Total 0

Summer Olympics appearances (overview)
- 1900; 1904–1912; 1920; 1924; 1928; 1932; 1936; 1948; 1952; 1956; 1960; 1964; 1968; 1972; 1976; 1980; 1984; 1988; 1992; 1996; 2000; 2004; 2008; 2012; 2016; 2020; 2024

Spain competed at the 1964 Summer Olympics in Tokyo, Japan. 51 competitors, 48 men and 3 women, took part in 35 events in 9 sports.

== Cycling ==
Six cyclists represented Spain in 1964.

Individual road race

- José Manuel López
- José Manuel Lasa
- Mariano Díaz
- Jorge Mariné

Team time trial

- José Goyeneche
- José Manuel López
- Mariano Díaz
- Luis Santamarina

== Shooting ==
Five shooters represented Spain in 1964.

Men

Athlete	Event	Final	
Athlete	Event	Points	Rank
Jaime Bladas	Trap	186	25
Pedro Medina	50 m rifle, prone	579	62
José Luis Alonso Berbegal	Trap	184	31
Juan García	50 m pistol	545	12
Juan Thomas	25 m rapid fire pistol	574	33

== Swimming ==
Men

Athlete	Event	Heat		Semifinal		Final	
Athlete	Event	Time	Rank	Time	Rank	Time	Rank
José Miguel Espinosa	100 m freestyle	57.4	44	Did not advance			
Antonio Pérez	100 m freestyle	57.8	49	Did not advance			
Miguel Torres	1500 m freestyle	17:36.0	10	—N/a		Did not advance	
Jesús Cabrera	200 m backstroke	2:19.7	17	Did not advance			
Nazario Padrón	200 m breaststroke	2:40.5	18	Did not advance			
Joaquín Pujol	200 m butterfly	2:28.3	30	Did not advance			
Juan Fortuny	400 m individual medley	5:18.2	24	—N/a		Did not advance	
Juan Fortuny; Miguel Torres; Antonio Pérez; Antonio Codina	4 × 200 m freestyle relay	8:32.6	14	—N/a		Did not advance	
Jesús Cabrera; Nazario Padrón; Joaquín Pujol; José Miguel Espinosa	4 × 100 m medley relay	4:17.4	12	—N/a		Did not advance	

Women

Athlete	Event	Heat		Semifinal		Final	
Athlete	Event	Time	Rank	Time	Rank	Time	Rank
Rita Pulido	100 m freestyle	1:06.7	38	Did not advance			
Rita Pulido	400 m freestyle	5:06.2	21	—N/a		Did not advance	
Isabel Castañe	200 m breaststroke	2:55.7	16	—N/a		Did not advance	
María Ballesté	100 m butterfly	1:13.1	=24	Did not advance			
Isabel Castañe	400 m individual medley	5:50.7	18	—N/a		Did not advance	
