= Virgil Luken =

American competition swimmer (1942–2023)

- Luken, age 22, in Olympic photo, 1964

Personal information
- Full name: Virgil William Luken
- Nickname: "Virg"
- National team: United States
- Born: September 12, 1942 Minneapolis, Minnesota, U.S.
- Died: June 10, 2023 (aged 80) Minnetonka, Minnesota, U.S.
- Occupations: Swim Coach (Lukin Swim School); Pool Builder (Virg Lukin & Assoc.)
- Height: 5 ft 9 in (1.75 m)
- Weight: 181 lb (82 kg)
- Spouse: Tania Hammer-Luken

Sport
- Sport: Swimming
- Strokes: Breaststroke
- Club: Gopher Swim Club
- College team: University of Minnesota
- Coach: Toi Jambeck (Roosevelt High); Bill Heusner (U. Minnesota); Rob Morrison (U. Minnesota); James Counsilman (64 Olympics)

Virgil "Virg" William Luken (September 12, 1942 – June 10, 2023) was an American competitive swimmer who was a Minnesota High School breaststroke state champion, and competed for the University of Minnesota. He participated in the 1964 Tokyo Olympics in the preliminary heats of the men's 4×100-meter medley relay, which won their heat in Olympic record time of 4:05.1. The finals team, in which he did not participate, later won a gold medal in record time 3:58.4. He later worked as a swim coach operating Virgil Lukin Swim School and had a four-decade career as a designer and builder of swimming pools which included managing his own company, Virg Lukin and Associates.

== Early life ==
Virgil Lukin was born September 12, 1942, in Minneapolis, Minnesota and grew up in South Minneapolis. He swam representing Minneapolis Roosevelt High School, where he graduated around 1960. Luken also competed and trained with Minneapolis's Gopher Swim Club in the Summer both in High School, and on summer breaks in college. As a summer league, Luken trained at the Minneapolis Naval Base in a few summers, and may have trained at the University of Minneapolis Norris and Cooke Hall pools on occasion. His coaches at the Gopher Club may included Minnesota coach Bill Heusner, and may have included Minnesota Coaches Bob Mowerson, and Niels Thorpe. While competing and training with the Roosevelt High Swim team, he was coached by Toi Jamback. Representing his High School on February, 26, 1960, in the qualifying round of the Minnesota High School State Championship, he defended his former record in the 100-yard breaststroke with a new record time of 1:07.6. Competing close to home, both the 1959 and 1960 State Championships were held at the University of Minnesota.

== 1964 Tokyo Olympics ==
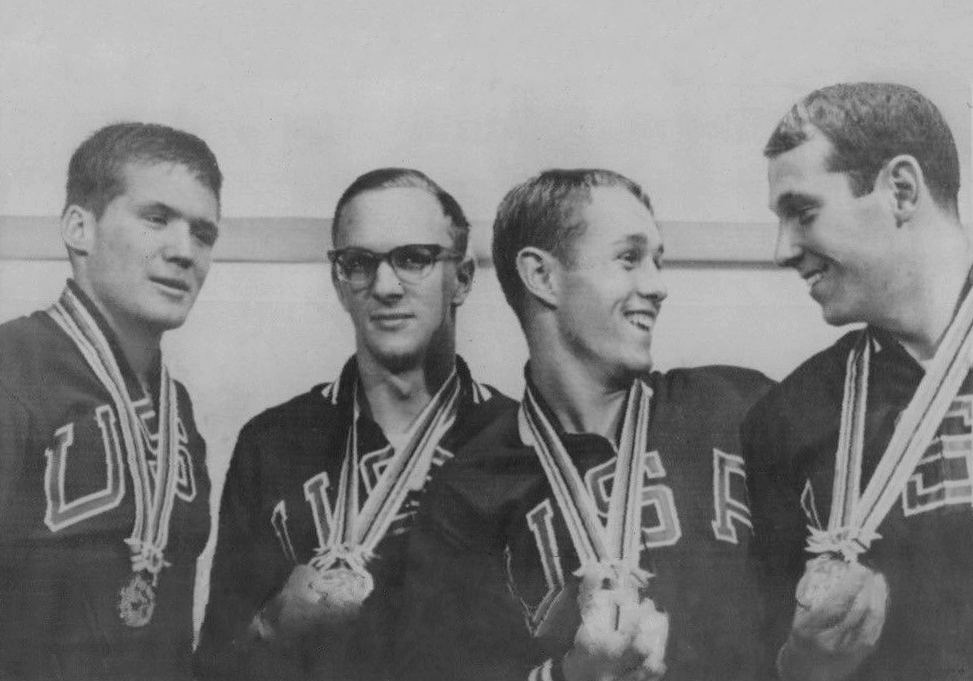
400 medley finals team, Clark, Schmidt, Craig, Mann

Luken represented the United States at the 1964 Summer Olympics in Tokyo, Japan, where he was managed by Hall of Fame Coach James Counsilman, the Indiana University swim coach, and Assistant Coach George Haines. The U.S. was a strong pre-game favorite to win the event.

He swam the breaststroke (second leg) in a preliminary qualifying heat for the gold medal-winning U.S. team of the men's 4×100-meter medley relay. Luken's 4x100 preliminary team qualified the U.S. for the finals, and won their heat in an Olympic record time of 4:05.1. Under the 1964 Olympic swimming rules, he was ineligible to receive a medal because he swam in the preliminary heats and not the event final. The finals team of Thompson Mann, Bill Craig, Fred Schmidt, and Steve Clark eventually set an Olympic record in the finals of the 4x100-meter medley with a time of 3:58.4. Breaststroker Bill Craig of the USC swim team replaced Luken in the final heat. Other swimmers that swam on Luken's Olympic record relay preliminary heat included in order Richard McGeagh of USC on backstroke, Walter Richardson of the University of Minnesota on butterfly, and Bob Bennett of USC as the freestyle anchor or final swimmer.

=== University of Minnesota ===
Luken attended the University of Minnesota, where he swam for the Minnesota Golden Gophers swimming and diving team in National Collegiate Athletic Association (NCAA) competition from 1962 to 1964. At Minnesota, he was coached by William Heusner, and Robert Morrison. Heusner coached the University team from 1957-1962 leading the team from a last place NCAA finish to a third place standing by 1962. While swimming for Minnesota, in 1963, Luken captured Big 10 titles in the medley relay, and in 1964 in his signature event, the 200 yard breaststroke. He won the NCAA 200 breaststroke title as a Sophomore in 1962. While at Minnesota, he was an All-American nine times.

=== Marriage ===
Luken married Tania Hammer, who as Tania Hammer-Luken would later serve as an Associate Pastor of Oak Knoll Lutheran Church in nearby Minnetonka, Minnesota where the couple would reside.

Continuing to swim and compete into his 50's, from 1983-1994 and likely longer, Virgil was a frequent competitor and trained with a Minneapolis are Club in United States Masters Swimming. In competition, he exceled in 50, 100, and 200-meter breaststroke events as well as the 100 and 200 Individual Medley, and competed in 200 Medley Relay events. He earned top ten national age group times from 1981-1993 and placed first nationally in his age group around 12 times.

=== Careers ===
Serving as a swimming instructor and coach, he was a manager, instructor and owner of his own Virgil Luken Swim School. For over four decades, he worked as a designer and builder of swimming pools and operated his own company, Virg Luken and Associates.

=== Honors ===
He was made a member of the University of Minnesota Hall of Fame in 1986, and the University of Minnesota's "M" Club in 2004.

Following a short illness, Luken died at the age of 80 at Methodist Hospital in St. Louis Park, in greater Minnetonka, Minnesota, a Minneapolis suburb on June 10, 2023. Memorial services for Luken were held mid-day Friday, June 16, at the Washburn-McReavy Edina Chapel. He was survived by his wife Tania and two children, a boy and a girl.

== See also ==
- List of University of Minnesota people
