= Swimming at the 1964 Summer Olympics – Men's 200 metre butterfly =

Men's 200 metre butterfly at the Games of the XVIII Olympiad
- Venue: Yoyogi National Gymnasium
- Date: 16 October 1964 (heats); 17 October 1964 (semifinals); 18 October 1964 (final)
- Competitors: 32 from 19 nations
- Winning time: 2:06.6 WR

Medalists
1st place, gold medalist(s)		Kevin Berry	Australia
2nd place, silver medalist(s)		Carl Robie	United States
3rd place, bronze medalist(s)		Fred Schmidt	United States

The men's 200 metre butterfly event at the 1964 Olympic Games took place on 16 and 18 October. This swimming event used the butterfly stroke. Because an Olympic-size swimming pool is 50 metres long, this race consisted of four lengths of the pool.

== Results ==
=== Heats ===
Heat 1

Rank	Athlete	Country	Time	Note
1	Carl Robie	United States	2:10.0	Q, OR
2	Atsushi Obayashi	Japan	2:15.1	Q
3	Antonio Rastrelli	Italy	2:17.3	
4	Hermann Lotter	United Team of Germany	2:18.2	
5	Vítor da Fonseca	Portugal	2:18.3	
6	Narong Chok-Umnuay	Thailand	2:32.5	

Heat 2

Rank	Athlete	Country	Time	Note
1	Kevin Berry	Australia	2:11.0	Q
2	Kosuke Sato	Japan	2:12.4	Q
3	Daniel Sherry	Canada	2:12.9	Q
4	David Gerrard	New Zealand	2:16.3	Q
5	Avraham Melamed	Israel	2:20.7	
6	Carlos Canepa	Peru	2:24.9	
7	Joaquín Pujol	Spain	2:28.3	

Heat 3

Rank	Athlete	Country	Time	Note
1	Luis Nicolao	Argentina	2:15.0	Q
2	John Stark	Australia	2:15.3	Q
3	Valentin Kuzmin	Soviet Union	2:15.5	Q
4	Werner Freitag	United Team of Germany	2:16.9	Q
5	Juan Alanís	Mexico	2:23.9	
6	Bernard Chan	Malaysia	2:26.6	

Heat 4

Rank	Athlete	Country	Time	Note
1	Phil Riker	United States	2:12.6	Q
2	Brian Jenkins	Great Britain	2:15.5	Q
3	Oleg Fotin	Soviet Union	2:17.3	
4	Gabriel Altamirano	Mexico	2:17.9	
5	Wolfgang Platzeck	United Team of Germany	2:18.7	
6	Volker Deckardt	Austria	2:21.3	
7	Dick Langerhorst	Netherlands	2:22.5	

Heat 5

Rank	Athlete	Country	Time	Note
1	Brett Hill	Australia	2:12.8	Q
2	Fred Schmidt	United States	2:13.3	Q
3	Yoshinori Kadonaga	Japan	2:14.5	Q
4	Giampiero Fossati	Italy	2:17.2	Q
5	Ralph Hutton	Canada	2:20.8	
6	Gustavo Ocampo	Peru	2:31.4	

=== Semifinals ===
==== Semifinal 1 ====
Rank	Athlete	Country	Time	Notes
1	Carl Robie	United States	2:09.3	Q, OR
2	Fred Schmidt	United States	2:11.5	Q
3	Brett Hill	Australia	2:11.9	Q
4	Valentin Kuzmin	Soviet Union	2:11.9	Q
5	Kosuke Sato	Japan	2:13.4	
6	Werner Freitag	United Team of Germany	2:13.5	
7	Luis Nicolao	Argentina	2:13.7	
8	John Stark	Australia	2:18.4	

==== Semifinal 2 ====
Rank	Athlete	Country	Time	Notes
1	Kevin Berry	Australia	2:09.8	Q
2	Phil Riker	United States	2:09.9	Q
3	Yoshinori Kadonaga	Japan	2:12.3	Q
4	Daniel Sherry	Canada	2:12.9	Q
5	Atsushi Obayashi	Japan	2:14.1	
6	David Gerrard	New Zealand	2:15.4	
7	Brian Jenkins	Great Britain	2:15.5	
8	Giampiero Fossati	Italy	2:18.1	

=== Final ===
Rank	Athlete	Country	Time	Notes
1	Kevin Berry	Australia	2:06.6	WR
2	Carl Robie	United States	2:07.5	
3	Fred Schmidt	United States	2:09.3	
4	Philip Riker	United States	2:11.0	
5	Valentin Kuzmin	Soviet Union	2:11.3	
6	Yoshinori Kadonaga	Japan	2:12.6	
7	Brett Hill	Australia	2:12.8	
8	Daniel Sherry	Canada	2:14.6	

Key: WR = World record
