= Swimming at the 1967 Pan American Games – Men's 100 metre freestyle =

Men's 100 metre freestyle at the 1967 Pan American Games
- Venue: Pan Am Pool
- Dates: July 26 (preliminaries and finals)
- Competitors: from - nations

Medalists
Gold medal	Don Havens	United States
Silver medal	Zac Zorn	United States
Bronze medal	Sandy Gilchrist	Canada

The men's 100 metre freestyle competition of the swimming events at the 1967 Pan American Games took place on 26 July at the Pan Am Pool. The last Pan American Games champion was Steve Clark of US.

This race consisted of two lengths of the pool, both lengths being in freestyle.

== Results ==
All times are in minutes and seconds.

KEY:	q	Fastest non-qualifiers	Q	Qualified	GR	Games record	NR	National record	PB	Personal best	SB	Seasonal best

=== Final ===
The final was held on July 26.

Rank	Name	Nationality	Time	Notes
1st place, gold medalist(s)	Don Havens	United States	53.8	GR
2nd place, silver medalist(s)	Zac Zorn	United States	54.0	
3rd place, bronze medalist(s)	Sandy Gilchrist	Canada	54.8	
4	Robert Kasting	Canada	54.8	
5	Ilson Asturiano	Brazil	54.8	
6	Luis Nicolao	Argentina	55.3	
7	Salvador Chávez	Mexico	55.7	
8	Teodoro Capriles	Venezuela	56.0	
