= 1964 NCAA University Division swimming and diving championships =

American college aquatic sports competition

- Host city: New Haven, Connecticut
- Date(s): March 1964
- Venue(s): Kiputh Pool; Payne Whitney Gymnasium; Yale University
- Teams: 20
- Events: 17

The 1964 NCAA University Division swimming and diving championships were contested at the 28th annual swim meet sanctioned and hosted by the NCAA to determine the individual and team national champions of men's collegiate swimming and diving among its University Division member programs in the United States, culminating the 1963–64 NCAA University Division swimming and diving season.

This was the first championship hosted only for swimming programs in the NCAA's University Division (future Division I). The inaugural College Division (future Divisions II and III) championship was held at the same time at Grove City College in Grove City, Pennsylvania and won by Bucknell.

These championships were hosted by Yale University at the Payne Whitney Gymnasium in New Haven, Connecticut during March 1964.

USC once again topped the team standings, finishing five points ahead of Indiana, the Trojans' third overall title and third in four years.

== Team standings ==
- (H) = Hosts
- (DC) = Defending champions
- Italics = Debut appearance

Rank	Team	Points
1st place, gold medalist(s)	USC (DC)	96
2nd place, silver medalist(s)	Indiana	91
3rd place, bronze medalist(s)	Yale (H)	87
4	Michigan	30
5	Minnesota	22
6	North Carolina	13
6	Ohio State	13
8	Villanova	12
9	Princeton	10
10	SMU	8
10	Wesleyan (CT)	8
12	Southern Illinois	7
12	Washington State	7
14	Stanford	5
15	Colgate	3
16	Northwestern	2
17	Florida	1
17	Oklahoma	1
17	Oregon	1
17	Texas	1

== Individual events ==
=== Swimming ===
Event	Champion	Team	Time
50 yard freestyle	Mike Austin	Yale	21.0
100 yard freestyle	Steve Clark	Yale	46.3
200 yard freestyle	Steve Clark (DC)	Yale	1:44.4
500 yard freestyle	Roy Saari	USC	4:45.8
1,650 yard freestyle	Roy Saari	USC	16:49.5
100 yard backstroke	Bob Bennett (DC)	USC	53.1
200 yard backstroke	Jed Graef	Princeton	1:56.2
100 yard breaststroke	Bill Craig	USC	59.9
200 yard breaststroke	Bill Craig	USC	2:12.1
100 yard butterfly	Walt Richardson (DC)	Minnesota	50.2
200 yard butterfly	Fred Schmidt	Indiana	1:53.5
200 yard individual medley	Roy Saari	USC	1:56.7
400 yard individual medley	Rich McGeagh	USC	4:16.4
400 yard freestyle relay	David Lyons; Ed Townsend; Frank Rice; Mike Austin	Yale (DC)	3:08.7
400 yard medley relay	Bob Bennett; Bill Craig; Jim McGrath; Roy Saari	USC	3:30.9

=== Diving ===
Event	Champion	Team	Score
1 meter diving	Rick Gilbert	Indiana	491.70
3 meter diving	Randy Larson	Ohio State	523.75

== See also ==
- 1964 NCAA College Division swimming and diving championships
- 1964 NAIA swimming and diving championships
- List of college swimming and diving teams
