= Swimming at the 1963 Pan American Games – Men's 100 metre freestyle =

Men's 100 metre freestyle at the 1963 Pan American Games
- Venue: -

Medalists
Gold medal	Steve Clark	United States
Silver medal	Steven Jackman	United States
Bronze medal	Daniel Sherry	Canada

The men's 100 metre freestyle competition of the swimming events at the 1963 Pan American Games took place in April 1963. The last Pan American Games champion was Jeff Farrell of US.

This race consisted of two lengths of the pool, both lengths being in freestyle.

== Results ==
All times are in minutes and seconds.

KEY:	q	Fastest non-qualifiers	Q	Qualified	GR	Games record	NR	National record	PB	Personal best	SB	Seasonal best

=== Final ===
The final was held on April.

Rank	Name	Nationality	Time	Notes
1st place, gold medalist(s)	Steve Clark	United States	54.7	
2nd place, silver medalist(s)	Steven Jackman	United States	54.8	
3rd place, bronze medalist(s)	Daniel Sherry	Canada	56.1	
4	Sandy Gilchrist	Canada	56.5	
5	Álvaro Pires	Brazil	56.8	
6	Luis Nicolao	Argentina	56.9	
7	-	-	-	
8	-	-	-	
