= Swimming at the 1963 Pan American Games =

The Swimming competition at the 4th Pan American Games was held in São Paulo, Brazil during the Games' run in 1963. It consisted of 16 long course (50 m) events: 8 for males and 8 for females.

In these Games, the U.S. earned all gold medals that were in dispute in swimming.

Venezuela won for the first time a medal, a bronze in the women's 4 × 100 m medley relay.

== Results ==
=== Men ===
Event	Gold		Silver		Bronze	
100 m freestyle	Steve Clark (United States) USA	54.7	Steven Jackman (United States) USA	54.8	Daniel Sherry; Canada	56.1
400 m freestyle	Roy Saari (United States) USA	4:19.3	Don Schollander (United States) USA	4:23.3	Sandy Gilchrist; Canada	4:29.1
1500 m freestyle	Roy Saari (United States) USA	17:26.2	Sandy Gilchrist; Canada	17:58.9	Ralph Hutton; Canada	18:08.6
100 m backstroke	Ed Bartsch (United States) USA	1:01.5	Charles Bittick (United States) USA	1:02.1	Athos de Oliveira; Brazil	1:03.2
200 m breaststroke	Chet Jastremski (United States) USA	2:35.4	Ken Merten (United States) USA	2:38.4	John Kelso; Canada	2:41.4
200 m butterfly	Carl Robie (United States) USA	2:11.3	Fred Schmidt (United States) USA	2:13.3	Luis Nicolao; Argentina	2:16.1
4 × 200 m free Relay	United States; Gary Ilman; Richard McDonough; David Lyons; Ed Townsend	8:16.9	Canada; Ralph Hutton; Aldwin Meinhardt; Ed Casalet; Sandy Gilchrist	8:33.0	Brazil; Athos de Oliveira; Antonio Renzo Filho; Antonio Celso Guimarães; Peter Wolfgang Metzner	8:41.4
4 × 100 m medley Relay	United States; Richard McGeagh; Bill Craig; Walter Richardson; Nicholas Kirby	4:05.6	Argentina; Carlos Van der Maath; Alberto Pérez; Luis Nicolao; Abel Pepe	4:17.3	Canada; Ed Casalet; John Kelso; Daniel Sherry; Sandy Gilchrist	4:17.5

=== Women ===
Event	Gold		Silver		Bronze	
100 m freestyle	Terri Stickles (United States) USA	1:02.8	Mary Stewart; Canada	1:03.3	Kathleen Ellis (United States) USA	1:03.5
200 m freestyle	Robyn Johnson (United States) USA	2:17.5	Terri Stickles (United States) USA	2:18.4	Lynne Pomfret; Canada	2:28.4
400 m freestyle	Sharon Finneran (United States) USA	4:52.7	Robyn Johnson (United States) USA	4:56.1	Lynne Pomfret; Canada	5:20.4
100 m backstroke	Nina Harmer (United States) USA	1:11.5	Cathy Ferguson (United States) USA	1:13.1	Eileen Weir; Canada	1:14.5
200 m breaststroke	Alice Driscoll (United States) USA	2:56.2	Roby Whipple (United States) USA	2:57.7	Marjon Wilmink; Canada	3:00.0
100 m butterfly	Kathleen Ellis (United States) USA	1:07.6	Mary Stewart; Canada	1:08.9	Kim Worley (United States) USA	1:11.6
4 × 100 m free Relay	United States; Elizabeth MacCleary; Sharon Stouder; Judy Norton; Donna de Varona	4:15.7	Canada; Lynne Pomfret; Sharon Pierce; Eileen Weir; Mary Stewart	4:31.7	Brazil; Eliana Souza Motta; Maria Lourdes Teixeira; Angela Maria Palioli; Vera Maria Formiga	4:34.3
4 × 100 m medley Relay	United States; Ginny Duenkel; Cynthia Goyette; Sharon Stouder; Donna de Varona	4:49.1	Canada; Mary Stewart; Madelaine Sevigny; Sharon Pierce; Lynne Pomfret	4:52.5	Venezuela; Bettina Giller; Luisa Ruiz; Laura Varela; Anneliese Rockenback	5:11.8

== Medal table ==
Rank	Nation	Gold	Silver	Bronze	Total
1	United States	16	9	2	27
2	Canada	0	7	8	15
3	Brazil	0	0	3	3
4	Argentina	0	0	2	2
5	Venezuela	0	0	1	1
Totals (5 entries)		16	16	16	48
