= Álvaro Pires =

Álvaro Pires may refer to:

- Álvaro Pires (footballer) (born 1985), Brazilian footballer
- Alvaro Pires (professor), Canadian law professor
- Álvaro Pires (swimmer) (born 1941), Brazilian swimmer
- Álvaro Pires de Évora, fifteenth century Portuguese painter
