= Swimming at the 1963 Pan American Games – Men's 200 metre butterfly =

Men's 200 metre butterfly at the 1963 Pan American Games
- Venue: -

Medalists
Gold medal	Carl Robie	United States
Silver medal	Fred Schmidt	United States
Bronze medal	Luis Nicolao	Argentina

The men's 200 metre butterfly competition of the swimming events at the 1963 Pan American Games took place on April. The last Pan American Games champion was Dave Gillanders of the United States.

This race consisted of four lengths of the pool, all lengths being in butterfly stroke.

== Results ==
All times are in minutes and seconds.

KEY:	q	Fastest non-qualifiers	Q	Qualified	GR	Games record	NR	National record	PB	Personal best	SB	Seasonal best

=== Final ===
The final was held on April.

Rank	Name	Nationality	Time	Notes
1st place, gold medalist(s)	Carl Robie	United States	2:11.3	
2nd place, silver medalist(s)	Fred Schmidt	United States	2:13.3	
3rd place, bronze medalist(s)	Luis Nicolao	Argentina	2:16.1	
4	Daniel Sherry	Canada	2:17.4	
5	Jorge Jimenez	Ecuador	2:23.4	
6	Aldwin Meinhardt	Canada	2:23.4	
7	-	-	-	
8	-	-	-	
