= Obayashi =

Obayashi may refer to:

- Obayashi Corporation, one of five major Japanese construction companies
- Obayashi (surname), a Japanese surname
- Obayashi Station, a railway station in Takarazuka, Hyōgo Prefecture, Japan
