= Brian Crosby =

Brian Crosby may refer to:

- Brian Crosby (composer) (born 1973), Irish composer, producer and musician
- Brian Crosby (author), American author, educator, and newspaper columnist
- Brian M. Crosby, American politician in the Maryland House of Delegates
