= Swimming at the 1963 Mediterranean Games =

- Venue: Piscina Felice Scandone
- Location: Naples, Italy
- Dates: 21–29 September 1963

The swimming competition at the 1963 Mediterranean Games was held in Naples, Italy.

== Medallists ==
=== Men's events ===
Games	Gold		Silver		Bronze	
100 m freestyle	Alain Gottvallès; France	56.3	Massimo Borracci; Italy	58.2	José Espinosa; Spain	58.4
400 m freestyle	Francis Luyce; France	4:31.9	Veljko Rogošić; Yugoslavia	4:33.6	Juan Fortuny; Spain	4:34.7
1500 m freestyle	Miguel Torres; Spain	17:59.3	Francis Luyce; France	18:16.7	Veljko Rogošić; Yugoslavia	18:18.7
200 m backstroke	Jesús Cabrera; Spain	2:21.2	Claude Raffy; France	2:21.7	Dino Rora; Italy	2:21.9
200 m breaststroke	Cesare Caramelli; Italy	2:40.8	Nazario Padron; Spain	2:44.5	Maurizio Giovannini; Italy	2:44.5
200 m butterfly	Federico Dennerlein; Italy	2:18.7	Giampiero Fossati; Italy	2:20.3	Joaquín Pujol; Spain	2:20.9
4 × 200 m freestyle relay	France	8:28.3	Italy	8:28.5	Spain	8:41.9
4 × 100 m medley relay	Italy	4:13.2	France	4:15.1	Spain	4:17.1

== Medal table ==
Rank	Nation	Gold	Silver	Bronze	Total
1	Italy	3	3	2	8
2	France	3	3	0	6
3	Spain	2	1	5	8
4	Yugoslavia	0	1	1	2
Totals (4 entries)		8	8	8	24
