= Swimming at the 1963 Pan American Games – Men's 400 metre freestyle =

Men's 400 metre freestyle at the 1963 Pan American Games
- Venue: -

Medalists
Gold medal	Roy Saari	United States
Silver medal	Don Schollander	United States
Bronze medal	Sandy Gilchrist	Canada

The men's 400 metre freestyle competition of the swimming events at the 1963 Pan American Games took place on April. The last Pan American Games champion was George Breen of US.

This race consisted of eight lengths of the pool, with all eight being in the freestyle stroke.

== Results ==
All times are in minutes and seconds.

KEY:	q	Fastest non-qualifiers	Q	Qualified	GR	Games record	NR	National record	PB	Personal best	SB	Seasonal best

=== Final ===
The final was held on April.

Rank	Name	Nationality	Time	Notes
1st place, gold medalist(s)	Roy Saari	United States	4:19.3	
2nd place, silver medalist(s)	Don Schollander	United States	4:23.3	
3rd place, bronze medalist(s)	Sandy Gilchrist	Canada	4:29.1	
4	Ralph Hutton	Canada	4:34.0	
5	Alfredo Guzmán	Mexico	4:39.1	
6	Teodoro Capriles	Venezuela	4:39.3	
7	-	-	-	
8	-	-	-	
