= Obayashi (surname) =

Obayashi (小林), Ōbayashi or Oobayashi (大林) is a Japanese surname. notable people with the surname include:

- Atsushi Obayashi (大林 敦, born 1943), Japanese swimmer
- Nobuhiko Obayashi (大林 宣彦, 1938–2020), Japanese director and screenwriter
- Motoko Obayashi (大林 素子, born 1967), Japanese volleyball player
- Ryūsuke Ōbayashi (大林 隆介, born 1946), Japanese voice actor
- Yoshi Obayashi, Japanese-born American comedian

== Fictional characters ==
- Keiko Obayashi, the main character of the 2003 comedy film Drugstore Girl
- Teruko Obayashi (大林 照子), a character from Strike Witches
