= Cesare Caramelli =

Italian swimmer

Personal information
- Born: October 26, 1938 (age 87)

Sport
- Sport: Swimming
Medal record
Representing Italy
Mediterranean Games
Gold medal – first place	1963 Naples	200m breaststroke
Gold medal – first place	1963 Naples	4x100m medley relay

Cesare Caramelli (born 26 October 1938) is an Italian former swimmer who competed in the 1964 Summer Olympics.
