= Volker Deckardt =

Austrian swimmer

Personal information
- Born: 9 March 1944 (age 82)

Sport
- Sport: Swimming

Volker Deckardt (born 9 March 1944) is an Austrian former swimmer. He competed in the men's 200 metre butterfly at the 1964 Summer Olympics.
