= Swimming at the 1963 Pan American Games – Men's 1500 metre freestyle =

Men's 1500 metre freestyle at the 1963 Pan American Games
- Venue: -

Medalists
Gold medal	Roy Saari	United States
Silver medal	Sandy Gilchrist	United States
Bronze medal	Ralph Hutton	Canada

The men's 1500 metre freestyle competition of the swimming events at the 1963 Pan American Games took place on April. The last Pan American Games champion was Alan Somers of US.

This race consisted of thirty lengths of the pool, all lengths being in freestyle.

== Results ==
All times are in minutes and seconds.

KEY:	q	Fastest non-qualifiers	Q	Qualified	GR	Games record	NR	National record	PB	Personal best	SB	Seasonal best

=== Final ===
The final was held on April.

Rank	Name	Nationality	Time	Notes
1st place, gold medalist(s)	Roy Saari	United States	17:26.2	
2nd place, silver medalist(s)	Sandy Gilchrist	Canada	17:58.9	
3rd place, bronze medalist(s)	Ralph Hutton	Canada	18:08.6	
4	Bill Farley	United States	18:30.4	
5	Alfredo Guzmán	Mexico	18:31.0	
6	Celestino Pérez	Puerto Rico	18:50.8	
7	-	-	-	
8	-	-	-	
