= Edward A. Doty =

Edward Andrew Doty
- Edward Doty in 1975
- Born: March 8, 1920; Los Angeles
- Died: February 4, 2010 (aged 89); Portland, Oregon
- Education: UCLA (BA and MA), meteorology
- Spouse: Marilyn Grace Roberson (m. 1942)
- Children: Susan, Timothy, Jesse, Mary
- Parents: Claude A. Doty (father); May (Mae) Annadown (mother)
- Relatives: Caroline May, Claude A. Jr., Donald P. (siblings)
- Military career
- Branch: United States Army; United States Air Force
- Service years: 1942 – c. 1966
- Rank: Lieutenant Colonel
- Awards: Air Force Commendation Medal; Soldier's Medal; American Campaign Medal; National Defense Service Medal

Edward A. Doty was a United States Air Force officer who founded their balloon branch and a meteorologist who served as head of the UCLA meteorology department.

== Early life ==
Doty was born on March 8, 1920 in Los Angeles to Claude Andrew Doty, an accountant for the U.S. Gypsum Company and his wife May Annadown Doty. In 1935, Doty participated in a celebration of his grandparents' 50th anniversary along with his older brothers Claude Jr. and Donald.

Doty graduated from Herbert Hoover High School of Glendale and earned a BS and MA in meteorology from UCLA.

== Military career ==
In March 1942, Doty enlisted in the US Army. On September 5, 1942, Doty, now an aviation cadet, married Marilyn Grace Roberson.

During World War Two, he served in Central America. From early 1943 to July 1944, he served as a weather officer in Panama. He then toured air bases in Central and South America as part of an effort to improve weather service. In April 1944, he was promoted to Captain. In 1945, he was transferred to Army Air Forces weather service at Asheville, North Carolina. In 1947, the Army Air Forces became the US Air Force.

In February 1948, Doty join the Electronics and Atmospheric Projects Section at Holloman Air Force Base. He served as project officer to C.B. Moore and NYU's balloon group at Holloman.

In 1949, a son was born to Doty and his wife in El Paso.

From January to May 1950, Doty attended Air Tactical School at Tyndall Air Force Base in Florida. On July 31, 1950, Doty was named Chief of the Atmospheric Research Branch, the Air Force's first balloon branch.

In 1951, Doty was responsible for Project Twinkle, the Air Force investigation into "Green Fireballs" – a type of unidentified flying object (UFO) that had been reported since the late 1940s in the southwestern United States, particularly in New Mexico. That July, Doty authored a report on a UFO sighting near Corona, New Mexico. In 1954, Doty was quoted in Collier's Magazine and a wire service story explaining how balloons were often mistaken for 'flying saucers'.

In December 1952, after five years at the Holloman Air Development Center's Atmospheric Research Unit, Doty was transferred to the Cambridge Research Center in Boston. A second 1954 piece went into more detail, reporting Maj. Doty was still at the Cambridge Research Center. By 1956, Doty had achieved the rank of Lt. Colonel and was serving in the Office of Deputy Chief of Staff for Development at USAF headquarters. In 1959, Doty was working on his thesis at the Air War College at Maxwell Air Force Base in Montgomery, Alabama.

In 1964, he was lauded by Air Force secretary Eugene M. Zuckert. In 1965, Lt. Col. Doty received the Air Force Commendation Medal for his role as a Titan III program control officer at Los Angeles's Space System Division. In his career, he was awarded the Soldier's Medal, the American Campaign Medal, and the National Defense Service Medal.

== Later life ==
In 1966, he was the head of the UCLA meteorology department. In 1967, Doty and his wife were honored at a surprise party celebrating their 25th anniversary. In 1975, Doty was photographed in a story about air pollution forecasts.

In 1976, his name was listed as endorsing a measure on nuclear safety. In 1982 Doty and his wife participated in a panel on defense policy. That year, Doty was quoted in a story about tornados. In 1982 and 1984 Doty presented a talk on the dangers of nuclear war. In 1989, he authored a series of letters to the editor about nuclear winter, Central America, and military spending.

In May 1991, Omni magazine published a piece by Patrick Huyghe that quoted Doty, who dismissed the possibility that the Roswell Incident was caused by a Japanese Fu-Go balloons. Doty explained that they "could not possibly have stayed aloft for two years". In 1995, a letter from Doty to David Bushnell of March 3, 1959 was cited in Roswell Report: Fact versus Fiction in the New Mexico Desert as evidence that Project Mogul was operating at Alagordo Army Airfield in the summer of 1947.

In 1996, he authored a letter to the editor endorsing a proposition for campaign reform. In 1999, Doty was named in articles about retirement.

Doty died on February 4, 2010.
