= Yoshinori Kadonaga =

Japanese swimmer (born 1947)

Personal information
- Born: 7 January 1947 (age 79)

Sport
- Sport: Swimming

Yoshinori Kadonaga (門永 吉典, Kadonaga Yoshinori; born 7 January 1947) is a Japanese former swimmer. He competed in the men's 200 metre butterfly at the 1964 Summer Olympics, where he advanced the final and finished in 6th position, with a time of 2:12.6.
