= Alberto Bourdillón =

Argentine swimmer (1943–2026)

Personal information
- Full name: Alberto Félix Bourdillón
- Born: 13 March 1943 Paraná, Entre Ríos Province, Argentina
- Died: 6 February 2026 (aged 82) Paraná, Entre Ríos Province, Argentina

Sport
- Sport: Swimming

Alberto Félix Bourdillón (13 March 1943 – 6 February 2026) was an Argentine swimmer. He competed in the men's 4 × 100 metre medley relay at the 1964 Summer Olympics. Bourdillón died on 6 February 2026, at the age of 82.
