= 1964 NCAA College Division swimming and diving championships =

American college aquatic sports competition

1964 NCAA College Division Swimming and Diving Championships
- Host city: Grove City, Pennsylvania
- Date(s): March 1964
- Venue(s): Grove City College

The 1965 NCAA College Division Swimming and Diving Championships were contested in March 1965 at Grove City College in Grove City, Pennsylvania at the first annual NCAA-sanctioned swim meet to determine the team and individual national champions of College Division men's collegiate swimming and diving in the United States.

This was the first championship hosted only for swimming programs in the College Division (future Divisions II and III).

Bucknell topped the team standings, grabbing the inaugural national title for the Bison.

== Team standings ==
- Note: Top 10 only
- (H) = Hosts
- Full results

Rank	Team	Points
1st place, gold medalist(s)	Bucknell	83
2nd place, silver medalist(s)	East Carolina	50
3rd place, bronze medalist(s)	La Salle	48
4	Long Beach State	34
5	Wesleyan (CT)	33
6	Colorado State	25
7	Cal State Los Angeles	23
8	American	16
9	Grove City (H)	10
10	RPI	12

== See also ==
- 1964 NCAA University Division swimming and diving championships
- List of college swimming and diving teams
