= Kosuke Sato =

Japanese swimmer

Personal information
- Born: 3 August 1942 (age 83)

Sport
- Sport: Swimming

Kosuke Sato (佐藤 好助, Satō Kōsuke; born 3 August 1942) is a Japanese former swimmer. He competed in the men's 200 metre butterfly at the 1964 Summer Olympics.
