= José Miguel Espinosa =

Spanish swimmer (1945–2024)

Personal information
- Born: 31 October 1945 Bilbao, Spain
- Died: 25 September 2024 (aged 78) Barakaldo, Spain

Sport
- Sport: Swimming
Medal record
Representing Spain
Mediterranean Games
Gold medal – first place	1967 Tunis	4x100m freestyle relay
Bronze medal – third place	1963 Naples	100m freestyle

José Miguel Espinosa (31 October 1945 – 25 September 2024) was a Spanish freestyle swimmer who competed in the 100 metre freestyle and the 4 × 100 metre medley relay at the 1964 Summer Olympics.

Espinosa died on 25 September 2024, at the age of 78.
