= Ernst-Joachim Küppers =

German swimmer (1942–2025)

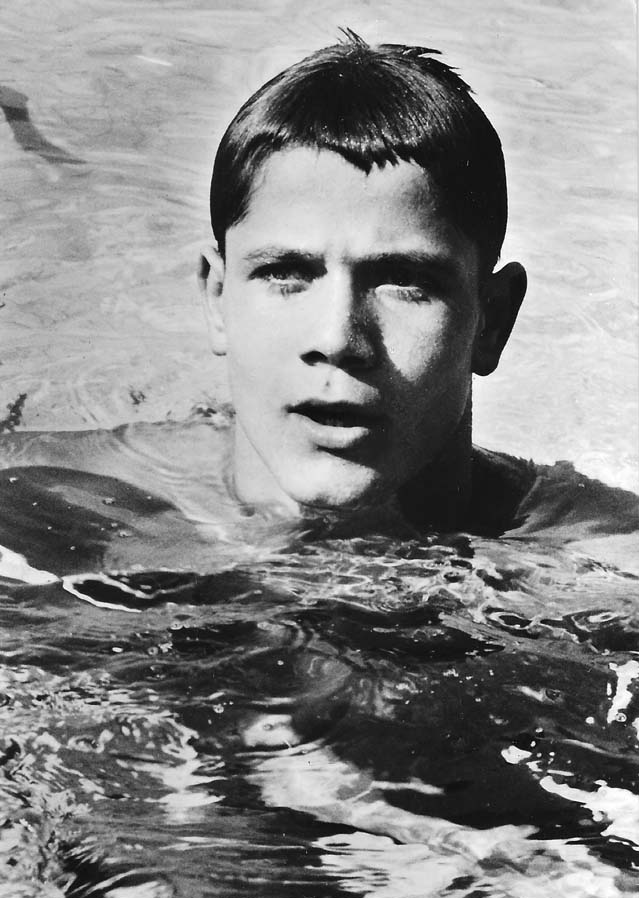
- Küppers in 1962

Personal information
- Born: 24 August 1942 Halle, Gau Halle-Merseburg, Germany
- Died: 5 February 2025 (aged 82) Herne, North Rhine-Westphalia, Germany

Sport
- Sport: Swimming
Medal record
Representing EUA
Olympic Games
Silver medal – second place	1964 Tokyo	4x100m medley relay

Ernst-Joachim Küppers (24 August 1942 – 5 February 2025) was a German swimmer. He competed in two events at the 1964 Summer Olympics. He won the silver medal in men's 4×100 metre medley relay. His father Ernst Küppers and mother Reni Erkens were both also Olympic swimmers for Germany. Ernst-Joachim Küppers died on 5 February 2025, at the age of 82.
