= Wolfgang Platzeck =

German swimmer

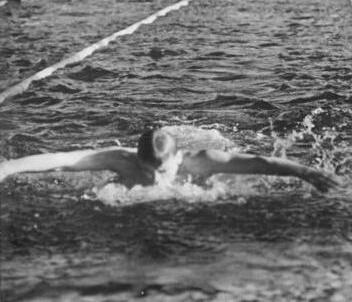
- Platzeck in 1967

Personal information
- Born: 3 March 1944 (age 82) Greiz, Germany

Sport
- Sport: Swimming

Wolfgang Platzeck (born 3 March 1944) is a German former swimmer. He competed in the men's 200 metre butterfly at the 1964 Summer Olympics.
