= Claude Raffy =

French swimmer (1945–2025)

Personal information
- Born: 2 January 1945 Marseille, France
- Died: 17 January 2025 (aged 80) Besse-sur-Issole, France

Sport
- Sport: Swimming
Medal record
Representing France
Mediterranean Games
Silver medal – second place	1963 Naples	200m backstroke
Silver medal – second place	1963 Naples	4x100m medley relay

Claude Raffy (2 January 1945 – 17 January 2025) was a French swimmer. He competed in the men's 100 metre backstroke at the 1960 Summer Olympics but was eliminated in the heats. Raffy died on 17 January 2025, at the age of 80.
