= Brett Hill =

Australian swimmer

Personal information
- Born: 8 August 1944 Sydney, Australia
- Died: 5 July 2002 (aged 57) Sydney, Australia

Sport
- Sport: Swimming
Medal record
British Empire Games
Bronze medal – third place	1962 Perth	Men's 220 yd Butterfly
Silver medal – second place	1966 Kingston	Men's 220 yd Butterfly

Brett Cecil Graeme Hill (8 August 1944 – 5 July 2002) was an Australian swimmer. He competed in the men's 200 metre butterfly at the 1964 Summer Olympics.
