= John Stark (swimmer) =

Australian swimmer

Personal information
- Born: 28 July 1946 (age 79)

Sport
- Sport: Swimming
Medal record
Men's swimming
Representing Australia
Maccabiah Games
Gold medal – first place	1965 Israel	200 m butterfly
Bronze medal – third place	1965 Israel	4×100 m freestyle relay
Bronze medal – third place	1965 Israel	4×200 m freestyle relay
Bronze medal – third place	1965 Israel	4×100 m Medley relay

John Stark (born 28 July 1946) is an Australian swimmer. He competed in the men's 200 metre butterfly at the 1964 Summer Olympics.

At the 1965 Maccabiah Games in Israel, he won a gold medal in the 200 m butterfly.
