= Vítor da Fonseca =

Portuguese swimmer

Personal information
- Nationality: Portuguese
- Born: 3 April 1946 (age 80)

Sport
- Sport: Swimming

Vítor da Fonseca (born 3 April 1946) is a Portuguese former butterfly swimmer. He competed in the men's 200 metre butterfly at the 1964 Summer Olympics.
