= Carl Robie =

American swimmer (1945–2011)

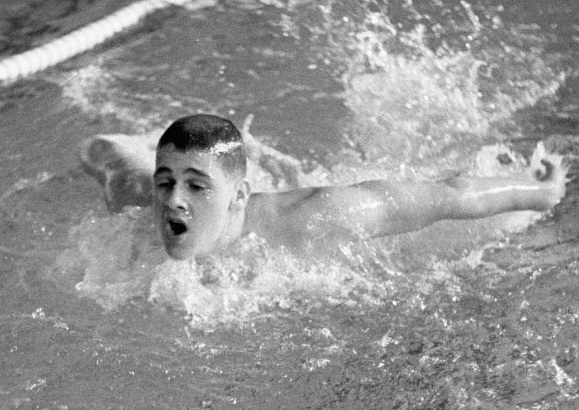
- Robie in 1964

Personal information
- Full name: Carl Joseph Robie III
- Nickname: "The Philadelphia Flyer"
- National team: United States
- Born: May 12, 1945 Darby, Pennsylvania, U.S.
- Died: November 29, 2011 (aged 66) Sarasota, Florida, U.S.
- Height: 5 ft 10 in (1.78 m)
- Weight: 161 lb (73 kg)

Sport
- Sport: Swimming
- Strokes: Butterfly
- Club: Suburban Seahawks Club
- College team: University of Michigan; 1967 Graduate
- Coach: Frank Keefe; Suburban Swim Club; Gus Stager; Michigan
Medal record
Men's swimming
Representing the United States
Olympic Games
Gold medal – first place	1968 Mexico City	200 m butterfly
Silver medal – second place	1964 Tokyo	200 m butterfly
Pan American Games
Gold medal – first place	1963 São Paulo	200 m butterfly
Universiade
Gold medal – first place	1965 Budapest	200 m butterfly
Gold medal – first place	1967 Tokyo	4x200 m freestyle
Silver medal – second place	1965 Budapest	400 m medley
Silver medal – second place	1967 Tokyo	100 m butterfly
Silver medal – second place	1967 Tokyo	200 m butterfly

Carl Joseph Robie III (May 12, 1945 – November 29, 2011) was an American competitive swimmer, who swam for the University of Michigan and was first a silver medalist in the 1964 Summer Olympics, and then a gold medalist in the 1968 Summer Olympics. He was a three-time world record-holder in the 200-meter butterfly, continuing to lower his times from 1961 to 1963. After graduating Dickinson Law School around 1970, he practiced civil law in Sarasota, Florida.

Living in Drexel Hill, he started his swimming career at nearby Philadelphia's Vesper Boat Club, under Coach Betsey Schumacher and Hall of Fame Coach, Mary Freeman Kelly.

== High school swimming ==
=== Butterfly record at Monsignor Bonner High ===
As a High School underclassman through his Sophomore year, he attended Monsignor Bonner High School in Philadelphia, where he placed first and set a District and AAU record for the 400-yard freestyle in 4:13.3 in January 1961 at the Senior Open Invitational Swimming meet. Though he would later be known for his prowess in the butterfly, he was diverse in his mastery of strokes, and set a District and Resident AAU record in the 200-yard Individual Medley at the same Senior Open Meet. At Bonner High, he was managed by ASCA Hall of Fame Coach Frank Keefe, who had also coached him at the Suburban Swim Club.

==== Butterfly world record ====
Achieving global recognition early, while swimming for the Vesper Boat Club at the National Men's AAU Swimming Championships at 17, in one of his singularly greatest achievements in swimming, he broke his own 1961 world record in the 200-meter butterfly with a 2:10.8 in the event final in August 1962. He led Monsignor Bonner High to its second Catholic Interscholastic Swimming Championship in February 1962 with a 1:53.8 in the 200 freestyle and also won the 200-yard medley. He continued to break world records in the 200-meter butterfly from 1961 to 1963.

=== Swimming for Peekskill Military Academy ===
By his Junior year in High School in 1962, Robie attended and competed in swimming for Peekskill Military Academy in Peekskill-on-the-Hudson, New York, where he set a record of 54 seconds in the 100-yard butterfly and swam in winning relays under Coach Christian Sparks. He would later graduate Peekskill Academy. An exceptional competitor by 17, Robie also held a record for the 200-meter breaststroke at 2:10.8. A highly competitive team, at Peekskill, Robie swam primarily against the Freshman teams of large Eastern Colleges, despite frequently being younger than their opponents. After his Junior year at Peekskill was completed, Robie trained with Hall of Famer George Breen, a 1960 Olympic bronze medalist in the 1500m, who had just been hired by Vespar Boat Club. In the summer after his Junior year, having enough credits, he made the decision to skip his Senior year at Peekskill. He and hBreen gave a call to Gus Stager, the swim coach of the University of Michigan, about attending and swimming for Michigan.

== College swimming career ==
Skipping his Senior year in High School, Robie swam as a Freshman in 1963 for Coach Stager at the University of Michigan, where he would eventually win two NCAA titles. Swimming for Michigan in 1965, his first NCAA championships was in the 400m individual medley and in 1967, his second was in the 200m butterfly.

Robie broke his own record in the 200-meter freestyle with a 2:10.6 at Chicago's National AAU Swimming Championship on August 10, 1963. He reset the record to 2:08.8 at the same meet. Swimming for Michigan in March 1966, he tied for third in the 400-yard individual medley at the Big 10 Swimming Championships in March 1966.

As a Michigan Senior in March 1967, while Captaining the team, Robie took first place in one of his signature events, the 200-yard butterfly at the Big 10 Championships in East Lansing, Michigan with a time of 1:53.35, though Michigan finished second to Indiana in the overall points scoring.

=== AAU Championship wins in 200-meter butterfly ===
Robie had an exceptional mastery of the 200-meter butterfly in AAU competition, winning the event in the United States National AAU Outdoor championships in the long course in 1961, 1962, 1963, 1964, 1965, and 1968. At the American National AAU Indoor short course championships, he won the 200-meter butterfly in 1965 and 1966. Robie broke the world record in men's 200-meter butterfly four times during his career, including twice on the same day in August 1962.

== International competition ==
Robie won a gold medal in the 200-meter butterfly in the 1963 Pan America games in Sao Paulo, Brazil.

He swam in the 1965 Budapest and 1967 Tokyo Universiades, winning a gold and silver in the 200-meter butterfly and 400-meter medley in 1965. In 1967 at the Tokyo Universiade, he won a gold in the 4x200 meter relay, and a silver in both the 100 and 200-meter butterfly.

=== '64 and '68 Olympics ===
Finishing second to Australian Kevin Berry in the 1964 Summer Olympics in Tokyo, Japan, Robie received a silver medal for his second-place finish in the men's 200-meter butterfly with a time of 2:07.5. He finished just under one second behind gold medal winner Barry.

Robie continued to train while at Michigan through 1967, as well as in 1968, during his first year in Law School. Some of his training in 1968 took place at a YMCA, often without the benefit of a coach. Despite having ended his collegiate swimming career, and reached what was considered at the time to be an advanced age of 23 for an Olympian, he co-captained the American swim team, and took the gold medal for winning the men's 200-meter butterfly with a time of 2:08.7 at the 1968 Olympics.

Adding to the excitement of his first-place finish, his 200-meter butterfly qualifying time at the preliminaries in Mexico City was not exceptional, as he was only the fifth fastest swimmer to be selected for the finals. Ironically, the time for his 1968 Olympic gold medal in the butterfly, his crowning achievement, was a second slower than his silver medal time in the 1964 Tokyo Olympics for the same event, four years earlier. In 1968, a few American Olympic swimmers may have slightly underperformed due to reactions to Mexican food and the high altitude in Mexico City.

== Retirement from swimming ==
Robie retired from swimming around November 1968, two weeks after the Summer Olympics, and shortly before his marriage. He married Christine Von Anderson on the evening of November 30, 1968 at St. Hugo of the Hills Church in Bloomfield Hills, Michigan. Robie's wife had also graduated from the University of Michigan.

== Practicing law ==
After attending Dickinson Law School in Carlisle, Pennsylvania from around 1968 to 1970, Robie practiced civil trial law in Sarasota, Florida, and specialized in trust and estate litigation. His wife Christine often served as a paralegal in his law practice.

== Honors ==
He was inducted in the International Swimming Hall of Fame as an "Honor Swimmer" in 1976. In November 1968, Robie was a nominee for the prestigious Sullivan Award by the Middle Atlantic Athletic Union. The Sullivan Award is presented to each year's most outstanding amateur athlete.

== Death ==
Robie died at the age of 66 on November 29, 2011 in Sarasota, Florida. Two of his children also pursued competitive swimming at a high level.

== See also ==
- List of members of the International Swimming Hall of Fame
- List of Olympic medalists in swimming (men)
- List of University of Michigan alumni
- World record progression 200 metres butterfly

Records
Preceded by Mike Troy; Kevin Berry; Kevin Berry	Men's 200-meter butterfly world record-holder (long course); August 19, 1961 – February 20, 1962; August 11, 1962 – October 23, 1962; March 18, 1963 – March 29, 1964	Succeeded by Kevin Berry; Kevin Berry; Kevin Berry
