= Roy Saari =

American swimmer and water polo player (1945–2008)

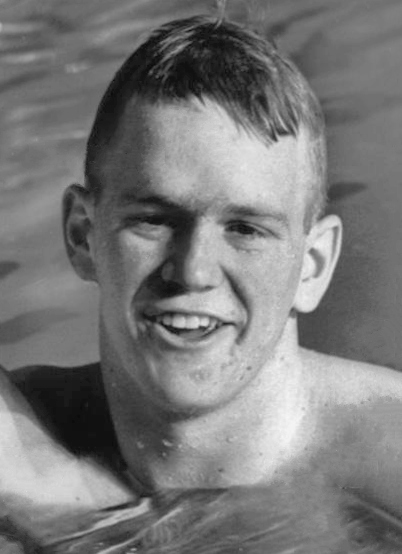
- Saari in 1963

Personal information
- Full name: Roy Allen Saari
- National team: United States
- Born: February 26, 1945 Buffalo, New York, U.S.
- Died: December 30, 2008 (aged 63) Mammoth Lakes, California, U.S.
- Occupations: Law, Real Estate agent
- Height: 6 ft 2 in (1.88 m)
- Weight: 190 lb (86 kg)
- Spouse: Sheryl Marie Johnstone (1966)
- Children: Around 2
- Relative: Urho Saari Robert Saari

Sport
- Sport: Swimming, Water Polo
- Events: Freestyle; Individual Medley
- College team: University of Southern California
- Club: El Segundo Swim Club; Phillips 66 WP Club (Long Beach)
- Coached by: Urho Saari (El Segundo, Olympics); Peter Daland (USC)
Medal record
Men's swimming
Representing the United States
Olympic Games
Gold medal – first place	1964 Tokyo	4×200 m freestyle
Silver medal – second place	1964 Tokyo	400 m medley
Pan American Games
Gold medal – first place	1963 São Paulo	400 m freestyle
Gold medal – first place	1963 São Paulo	1500 m freestyle
Universiade
Gold medal – first place	1965 Budapest	4×100 m freestyle
Gold medal – first place	1965 Budapest	4×200 m freestyle

Roy Allen Saari (February 26, 1945 – December 30, 2008) was an American swimmer and water polo player who competed for the University of Southern California in both water polo and swimming. Choosing to compete only in swimming in the 1964 Olympics, in individual events he won a silver medal in the 400 meter individual medley and in relays he won a gold in the 4×200 meter freestyle in world record time. After completing his studies at USC in 1967, and marriage, he graduated Loyola Marymount Law School in 1973, and practiced law from 1973-1978 in Orange County. He then began a career in Real Estate and Construction after a move to Mammoth Lakes, California in 1978.

Of Finnish descent, Roy was born February 26, 1946 in Buffalo, New York, the middle child of three siblings to mother, Wanda and father, Urho Saari. Roy's father Urho had swum for Buffalo State University, and played water polo for the U.S. Army in the 1940's. Roy attended El Segundo High School where he was coached by his father Urho in both swimming and water polo. At only 13, in 1958, he won a long distance swim championship becoming the youngest AAU champion to date.

== 1964 Tokyo Olympics ==
Father Urho Saari at 17, circa '30

Roy and his younger brother Robert Saari qualified for the 1964 U.S. Olympic water polo team, where their father Urho was the Head U.S. Olympic coach. Roy qualified for the 1964 Summer Olympics in both swimming and water polo, and chose swimming, as the Olympic rules of the time did not allow him to compete in two sports. Before the 1964 Olympics, Roy became the first person to break the 17 minute barrier in the 1500 meter event, but in the Olympic final he was suffering from a cold and clocked a disappointing 17:29.2, placing him seventh in competition and out of medal contention.

Roy won a gold medal as a member of the first-place U.S. team in the 4×200-meter freestyle relay at the 64 Olympics, setting a new world record in the final with teammates Steve Clark, Gary Ilman and Don Schollander who swam a combined record time of 7:52.1. Individually, he earned a silver medal in the 400-meter individual medley at the 1964 Olympics with a time of 4:47.1. He also advanced to the finals of the 400-meter freestyle and 1,500-meter freestyle, placing fourth and seventh, respectively as noted earlier.

Saari was invited to try out on September 1-2, 1968, for the 1968 US Olympic water polo squad, but was not chosen for the team.

In his swimming career, he set a total of four world records, and was the first person to go under the 17 minute mark for the 1500 meter event, setting a record time of 16:58.7.

=== University of Southern California ===
He attended the University of Southern California and swam for the USC Trojans swimming and diving team under Hall of Fame Coach Peter Daland, captaining the team in 1966. He also competed on USC'S water polo team, where he lettered in water polo in 1963 and in 1965-66, and won All American water polo honors in each of the three years he competed. He played water polo at the national level during some of his collegiate years. While a swimmer at USC, Robert Saari matched Jack Medica’s NCAA record of winning nine individual events in NCAA competition, which consisted of winning three events in three successive years. He also was on two NCAA championship relay teams in swimming. He graduated from USC in 1967.

In national championships, he won AAU national events from the 100 yard relay distance to 3 miles in freestyle events, and as a multi-stroke athlete, won a national championship in the 400m Individual Medley.

=== Non-olympic international competition ===
In international competition, he won gold medals at the Budapest, Hungary Universiade in 1965 in the 4x100 meter freestyle relay and the 4x200 meter freestyle relay. At the Sao Paulo, Brazil, Pan American Games in 1963, Roy won a gold medal in both the 400 meter freestyle event and the 1500 meter freestyle event.

=== Marriage ===
Saari married his wife Sheryl Marie Johnstone in the summer of 1966, and they remained married until Roy's death in 2008. Sheryl attended Burbank's John Muir High School, and USC where she met Roy, and was a member of Kappa Kappa Gamma Sorority. Roy and Sheryl had two children and several grandchildren that survived him.

=== Honors ===
Saari was admitted to the USA Water Polo Hall of Fame in 1982, and became a member of the International Swimming Hall of Fame in 1976. He was a 1965 NCAA Swimmer of the Year 1965, and a 1966 Athlete of the year in the Coast Conference. He was inducted into the University of Southern California Athletic Hall of Fame in 1995.

=== Careers ===
Roy Saari received his law degree from Loyola Marymount University in 1973. Between 1973 and 1978 he practiced law in Orange County, California, and then worked as a real estate agent and planning commissioner in Mammoth Lakes, California.

Saari died at his home in Mammoth Lakes, California on December 30, 2008, of heart failure, at the age of 63. Services were held on January 11 at the Mountainside Conference Center on Minaret Road in Mammoth Lakes. In 1978, he had moved from Huntington Harbor, California with his family to Mammoth Lakes, California where he worked in Construction and Real Estate. Part of his swimming speed was attributed to his kicking style which consisted of a fast and highly efficient scissors kick and then a short glide for each two arm strokes. In 1982, he was inducted into the USA Water Polo Hall of Fame.

== See also ==
- List of Olympic medalists in swimming (men)
- List of members of the International Swimming Hall of Fame
- List of University of Southern California people
- World record progression 1500 metres freestyle
- World record progression 4 × 200 metres freestyle relay

Records
Preceded by John Konrads	Men's 1,500-meter freestyle world record-holder (long course); August 17, 1963 – August 2, 1964	Succeeded by Murray Rose
Preceded by Murray Rose	Men's 1,500-meter freestyle world record-holder (long course); September 2, 1964 – August 15, 1965	Succeeded by Stephen Krause
