= Alvaro Pires (professor) =

Canadian law professor

Alvaro Pires is a Canadian law professor, currently a Distinguished University Professor and Canada Research Chair in Legal Traditions and Penal Rationality at University of Ottawa.
