= Philip Moriarty =

British physics professor

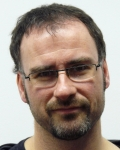
Philip Moriarty

Philip Moriarty (born 1968 in London) is an Irish physicist and professor of physics at the University of Nottingham. He is known for his work on nanostructures and his collaboration with Brady Haran on the YouTube video series Sixty Symbols.

== Education and career ==
From 1990 to 1994, Moriarty attended the School of Physical Sciences of Dublin City University, where he received his doctorate in physics in 1994. Until 1997, he wasa postdoctoral researcher in the field of physics at the University of Nottingham. He became a lecturer in the Department of Physics until 2003. Since 2005, he has been Professor of Physics at the School of Physics and Astronomy, University of Nottingham.

Moriarty is one of the collaborating members of the Sixty Symbols Internet video series, where Brady Haran interviews a scientist about some physics topic in each episode. In 2016, Haran, Michael Merrifeld and Moriarty were awarded the Kelvin Medal and Prize by the Institute of Physics. The citation was "for innovative and effective promotion of the public understanding of physics through the Sixty Symbols video project."

Moriarty is the author of When the Uncertainty Principle Goes to 11: Or How to Explain Quantum Physics with Heavy Metal. This book was shortlisted for Physics World's Book Of The Year 2018. He also wrote Nanotechnology for Oxford University Press's Very Short Introductions series.

== Selected papers ==
- Moriarty, Philip (2001). "Nanostructured materials". Reports on Progress in Physics. 64 (Part 3): 297–382. Bibcode:2001RPPh...64..297M. doi:10.1088/0034-4885/64/3/201. S2CID 250868168.
- Moriarty, P.; Taylor, M. D. R.; Brust, M. (2002). "Nanostructured cellular networks". Physical Review Letters. 89 (24) 248303. Bibcode:2002PhRvL..89x8303M. doi:10.1103/PhysRevLett.89.248303. PMID 12484986.
- Martin, Christopher P.; Blunt, Matthew O.; Pauliac-Vaujour, Emmanuelle; Stannard, Andrew; Moriarty, Philip; Vancea, Ioan; Thiele, Uwe (2007). "Controlling pattern formation in nanoparticle assemblies via directed solvent dewetting". Physical Review Letters. 99 (11) 116103. Bibcode:2007PhRvL..99k6103M. doi:10.1103/PhysRevLett.99.116103. PMID 17930453. S2CID 4979707.
