= József Gulrich =

Hungarian swimmer

Personal information
- Nationality: Hungarian
- Born: 22 May 1942 Budapest, Hungary
- Died: 20 July 2000 (aged 58) Budapest, Hungary

Sport
- Sport: Swimming

József Gulrich (22 May 1942 – 20 July 2000) was a Hungarian swimmer. He competed in two events at the 1964 Summer Olympics.
