= Herbert Hoover High School (Glendale) =

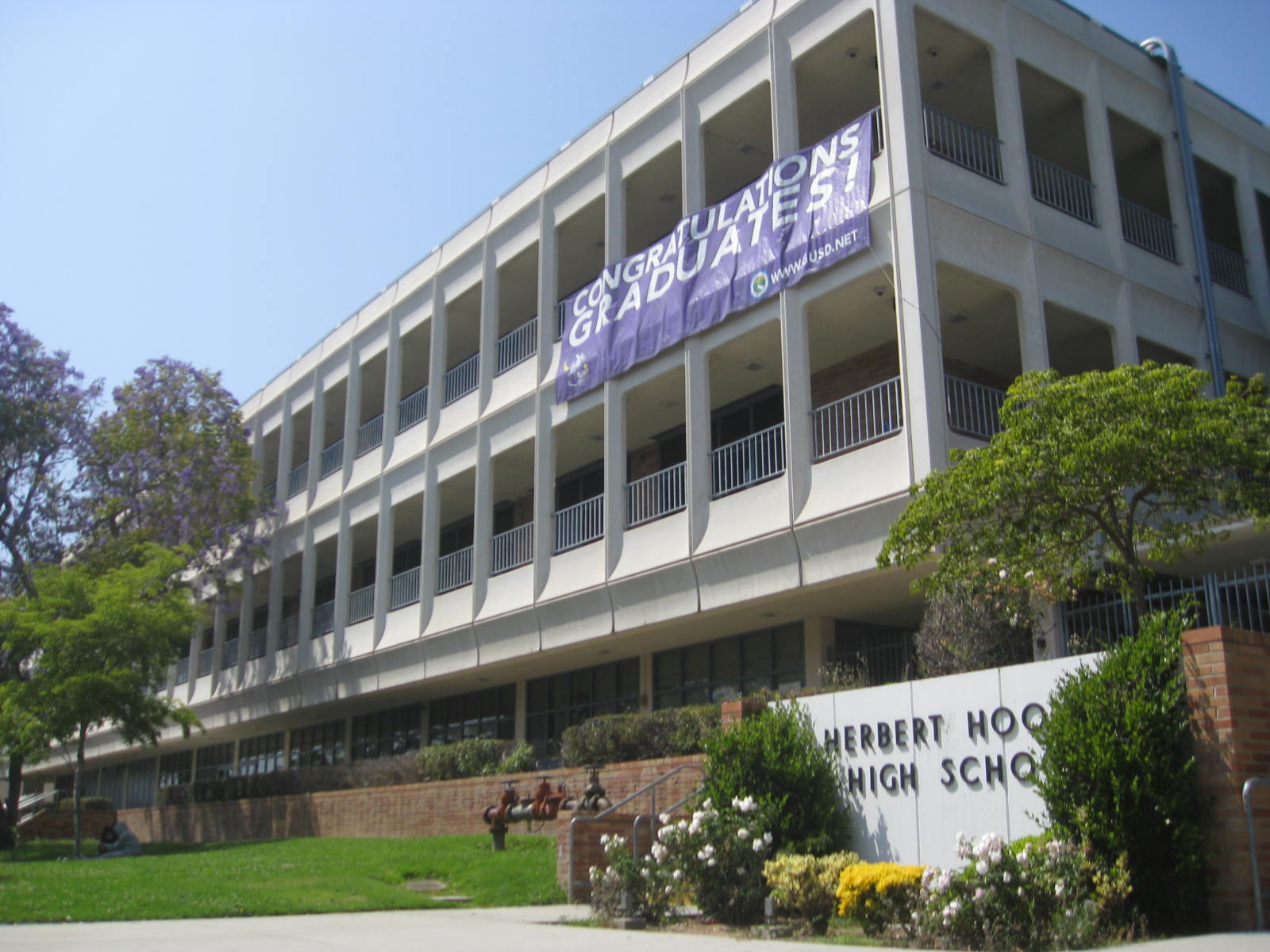

Location
- 651 Glenwood Rd; Glendale, California; United States; 34.165791°N 118.270510°W

Information
- Type: Public
- Established: 1929
- School district: Glendale Unified School District
- Principal: Dr. Jeremy Spurley
- Staff: 71.79 (FTE)
- Student to teacher ratio: 21.42
- Campus: Suburban
- Colors: Purple and White
- Athletics conference: CIF Southern Section Pacific League
- Mascot: Tornado
- Rival: Glendale High School
- Newspaper: Tornado Times
- Yearbook: The Scroll
- Website: hooverhs.gusd.net

Herbert Hoover High School is a public high school in Glendale, California, United States. The school is named after Herbert Hoover, the 31st president of the United States and is located on an 18.6 acres (75,000 m^{2}) campus. The school's colors are purple and white.

Hoover High School is part of a neighborhood cluster that includes Mark Keppel Elementary School and Eleanor J. Toll Middle School. As of the 2020–21 school year, Hoover High School has an enrollment rate of 1,431 students.

== History ==
The school's original campus on Glenwood Road opened in 1929. Named after Herbert Hoover, it claims to be the only high school named after a president while they were still in office. The school was built to serve the northern Foothill area of Glendale, which had experienced rapid development in the 1920s. The first issue of the school yearbook, Scroll, included copies of letters written by Hoover and his wife, Lou. The school dedicated that issue to Hoover.

The school has been the setting for several television programs and movies, most notably Because They're Young, which was filmed at the campus during the summer recess in 1959. The original campus, with the exception of the auditorium and physical education facilities, was demolished in 1966 and replaced with a new facility which was completed in 1969. In 1990, due to continual and anticipated growth in the number of students entering Hoover High, a 33-classroom facility was built and completed in 1992.

In 2001, Hoover High School met its school-wide Academic Performance Index (API) and received over $150,000 in Governor's Incentive Award money. For the past two years, 40% of the graduating seniors planned to attend a four-year college. Some 44.4% of graduating seniors meet the University of California A-G requirements. Hoover High School offers 22 different Advanced Placement (AP) classes including the following: English Language, English Literature, Calculus AB, Calculus BC, Statistics, French Language and Culture, Spanish Language and Culture, Spanish Literature and Culture, Italian Language and Culture, Econ-Macro, Government/Politics U.S., Psychology, U.S. History, World History, Human Geography, African American Studies, Biology 3-4, Chemistry 3-4, Physics 1, Physics 2, Physics C, Art History, Studio Art: Photo, Studio Art: Drawing/Painting, and Music Theory.

In 2010, Hoover High School met its school wide API target with an overall API of 772; an eleven-point gain over 2009. Hoover High's API has grown 158 points in the last 10 years. Fifty students earned recognition from the College Board as "AP Scholars". Another 15 earned the "AP Scholar with Honor" designation and 20 students earned the honor of "AP Scholar with Distinction." In 2013, Hoover began offering one AP class for 9th graders, AP Human Geography, being one of the first high schools to do so.

== Demographics ==
As of the 2022–2023 school year, 65% of all students are Non-Hispanic Whites (mostly being Armenians), 22% are Hispanics/Latinos, 5% are Asians, with the remaining 8% includes Filipinos, African Americans, American Indians, or Alaska Natives, and Pacific Islanders. Glendale, California has the largest population of Armenians not in Armenia or Russia.

== Academics ==
In 2014, Brian Crosby became the co-chair of the English department. In fall 2015, the school's automotive program was re-established with support from car dealerships on Brand Boulevard of Cars.

== Student discipline and culture ==
In 2010, outgoing principal Kevin Welsh stated that there were frequent racial tensions between Armenian and Hispanic/Latino students. In 2000 Jefferey Gettleman and Lee Condon of the Los Angeles Times reported that in the event of disputes between Armenians and Latinos, people take racial lines, and that the groups do not often socially mingle. According to Gettleman and Condon, recent graduates and current students of the school characterized it as "polarized" between Latinos and Armenians. Tensions between Armenians and Latinos had occurred in other parts of the Los Angeles area.

At least three violent incidents involving Hoover students have occurred, including the 1995 stabbing death of Tony Petrossian, who had intervened in a fight between two teens over a broken car stereo; the 1998 shooting of Avetis “Avo” Demirchyan, involving in a dispute between Armenians; and the 2000 stabbing of 12th grade student Raul Aguirre, who attempted to intervene between Armenian and Hispanic gangs but who was not a gang member himself. The three incidents did not occur on campus directly, but Welsh stated that they damaged the school's reputation. The Aguirre incident was the first death related to Latino-Armenian tensions.

On October 3, 2018, a brawl broke out in the school's upper quad during lunch break, believed to have been caused by racial tensions between the two groups. Due to the scale of the fight, police was called to break it up and the school was put under lockdown.

== Athletics ==
Hoover High School provides a wide variety of sports to students including boys' water polo (3rd place, 2008–2009 season and again 2009–2010 season and reached CIF division VI quarterfinals) and girls' water polo, boys' and girls' volleyball, boys' and girls' soccer (2006-2007 league champions), boys' and girls' basketball, boys' American football (girls are also welcome), baseball, softball, track, cross country, golf, pep squad, swimming and wrestling.

The 1975 baseball team won the CIF 4A Championship defeating Lakewood High 2–1 at Dodger Stadium.

A significant aspect of the school's history is the long running cross-town rivalry with Glendale High School. "BGD" known as "Big Game Day" or "Beat Glendale Day" is the biggest social/athletic event of the school year. Even though every sport has its own "BGD" game, American football is the biggest of them all. On the day of the big football game, the school provides events such as "The Poster Drop", which is a competition for every grade (9-12) taking place on the Friday morning of the game, and spirit assemblies. The game usually takes place at Glendale High School because Hoover High School does not have a "proper" field. The BGD game did not take place in 2018 due to security concerns regarding the large scale brawl that occurred weeks prior to the game, breaking the 89 year tradition, while the 2020 game did not take place as a result of the COVID-19 pandemic.

The school's mascot, "The Tornadoes", was temporarily changed in the past to the "Wind Gusts" when a Kansas team whose town had just been ravaged by tornadoes came to visit.

The school also includes a wrestling team. The number of participants declined in 2014, but coach Dave Beard stated that the students who remained were more committed.

In 2015 the school marching band won its first California State Band Championship.

== Miscellaneous activities ==
BETA
Beta is a business academic program for which students must process an application if they are interested in the program. Those who are accepted are required to take at least five semesters of classes that include business technology, keyboarding, virtual enterprise and introduction to business.

Fine Arts Academy
Students are nominated to the Hoover High School Fine Arts Academy. Academy students are invited to take advanced classes at Hoover to create a fine arts emphasis in their degree program. Students must take three years of arts classes while enrolled at Hoover in order to be considered an academy graduate. Of these three courses, at least two must be at Hoover. Along with the academic distinction that comes with being part of the academy, students are eligible to participate in events at the Hoover Arts Gallery.

Jazz Ensemble
Students audition to play in the Hoover High School Studio Jazz Orchestra, the flagship performing group at Hoover. All instrumentalists are welcome. Trumpets, trombones, and saxophones participate as well as flutes, clarinets, violins, cellos and, at one point, a bassoon and a harp. Jazz students play a variety of music styles, including swing, Latin jazz, Afro-Cuban, reggae, jazz-rock fusion, pop and jump-swing. The Studio Jazz Orchestra has received more major awards than any other comprehensive high school jazz group in the country.

Hoover Tornado Marching Band
The Hoover Tornado Marching Band (HTMB) was taken over by Martin Rhees in 2009. The band has performed at numerous events of football games to formal and paid events at hotels. HTMB is a competitive band that is currently in the California State Band Championships (CSBC) wire. Since 2012 the band was categorized as a 3A division band until 2017 where the band moved up to the 4A division due to size changes in the circuit. The band continues to compete every year during the Fall season representing themselves, their city, and school. To join the band, students do not need a musical background to be a part of an award-winning band.

Currently, HTMB are CSBC State Champions in the 3A division in 2015 and 2016 and 4A division champions in 2017. They have also won the bronze medal in the CSBC Grand Championships in 2015 and 2017 and have placed 4th in 2016 at Grand Championships. The HTMB percussion section continues to defend their title as the best percussion section in any division they are in since 2013 and they have won the title as the best percussion section in the entire circuit at Grand Championships in 2017.

== Notable former students ==
- Steven Banks, actor, The Steven Banks Show (Class of 1972)
- Forrest Beaty, national high school record holder 220-yd dash (1961), co-holder 100-yd dash record (1962)
- Richard Boone, actor, star of films and Have Gun Will Travel television series
- John Cho, actor, best known as Harold Lee in Harold & Kumar Go to White Castle (Class of 1990)
- Bob Clampett, pioneering Hollywood cartoonist and animator
- Bill Craig, gold medalist, swimming, 1964 Olympics
- Jack Davis, 2-time silver medalist, 110M high hurdles, 1952 & 1956 Olympics
- Edward A. Doty, US Air Force balloon pioneer and meterology professor
- Glenn Dumke, Chancellor, California State University System, 1962–82
- Pamelyn Ferdin, child actress (voice of Lucy Van Pelt in Peanuts) (Class of 1977)
- Bob Gagliano, quarterback for 7 NFL teams, 1981–1993
- Joseph Hahn, DJ for the band Linkin Park and music video director (Class of 1995)
- Lee Hartwell, Nobel Prize for Medicine, 2001
- Joe Hillman, 1987 NCAA Basketball Champion (Indiana University) (Class of 1984)
- Paul Ignatius, Secretary of the Navy, 1967–69
- Maren Jensen, actress, co-star of original Battlestar Galactica television series 1978–79 (Class of 1974)
- Ed King, guitarist of Lynyrd Skynyrd and Strawberry Alarm Clock, 1964
- Ray Lamb, Major League Baseball pitcher with Cleveland Indians and L.A. Dodgers
- Héctor López, boxer, silver medalist, 1984 Olympics
- Justin Meldal-Johnsen, bass guitarist with Grammy Award-winning artist Beck (Class of 1988)
- Eva Mendes, actress
- Carlos Moorhead, United States Congressman, 1973–1997
- Sev Ohanian, award-winning film screenwriter and producer of Searching and Sinners
- Wally Ritchie, former Major League Baseball pitcher
- Edmen Shahbazyan, mixed martial artist
- Stirling Silliphant, Academy Award-winning screenwriter In the Heat of The Night
- Juno Stover, diver, twice Olympic medalist; twice USA/AAU champion; twice Pan-American Games medalist
- Ron Underwood, film director, Tremors, City Slickers
- Tiger JK, rapper, record producer, one of the founders of the hip-hop group "Drunken Tiger"
