= Brian Crosby (author) =

American writer and journalist

- Born: United States
- Occupations: Author, educator, newspaper columnist
- Writing career
- Genre: Nonfiction
- Subject: Education
- Website: www.brian-crosby.com

Brian Crosby is an American author, educator, and newspaper columnist. He writes "The Crosby Chronicles" blog for the Glendale News-Press. He is a national board-certified teacher and has taught high school English for 31 years at Herbert Hoover High School in Glendale, California. He retired from teaching in 2020. As of 2014, he is the co-chair of the English Department at Herbert Hoover High School in Glendale, California. He has written two books about teaching and the educational system. His 2002 book, The $100,000 Teacher: A Teacher's Solution to America's Declining Public School System was honored by ForeWord magazine as the Book of the Year in Education.

== Published works ==
- Crosby, Brian (2002). The $100,000 Teacher: A Solution to America's Declining Public School System, Capital Books, 288 pages. ISBN 978-1892123558
- Crosby, Brian (2008). Smart Kids, Bad Schools: 38 Ways to Save America's Future, Thomas Dunne Books, 320 pages. ISBN 978-0312372583
