= Isabel Castañe =

Spanish swimmer

Personal information
- Born: 10 June 1946 (age 80) Barcelona, Spain

Sport
- Sport: Swimming

Isabel Castañe (born 10 June 1946) is a Spanish former breaststroke and medley swimmer. She competed at the 1960 Summer Olympics and the 1964 Summer Olympics.
