= Dino Rora =

Italian swimmer

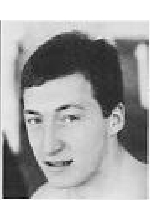

Personal information
- Born: March 5, 1945 Turin, Italy
- Died: January 28, 1966 (aged 20) Bremen, Germany

Sport
- Sport: Swimming
Medal record
Representing Italy
Mediterranean Games
Gold medal – first place	1963 Naples	4x100m medley relay
Bronze medal – third place	1963 Naples	200m backstroke

Dino Rora (5 March 1945 – 28 January 1966) was an Italian swimmer who competed in the 1964 Summer Olympics.

He died in the Lufthansa Flight 005 crash in Bremen, Germany.
