= Antonio Pérez (swimmer) =

Spanish swimmer

Personal information
- Born: 22 October 1944 (age 81)

Sport
- Sport: Swimming

Antonio Pérez (born 22 October 1944) is a Spanish former freestyle swimmer. He competed in two events at the 1964 Summer Olympics.
