= Peter Daland =

American swimming coach

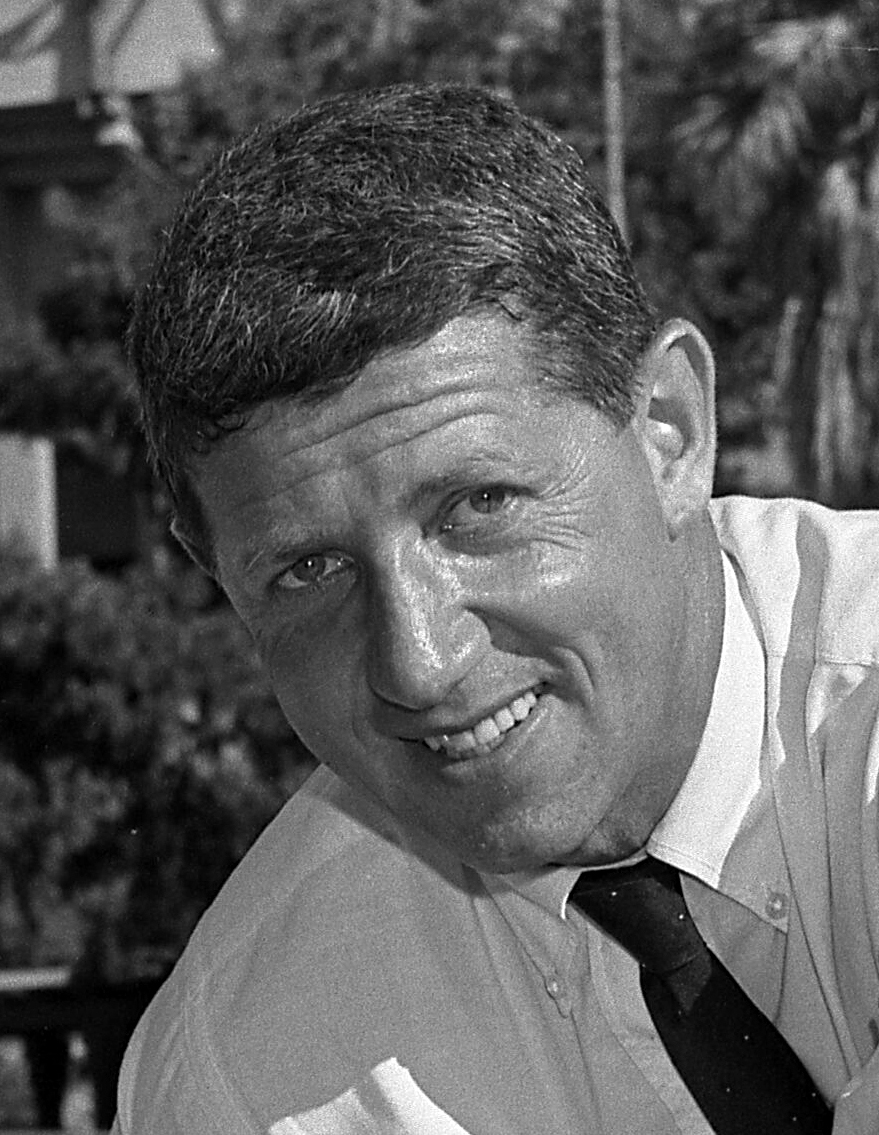
- Daland in 1964

Biographical details
- Born: April 12, 1921; New York City, New York, U.S.
- Died: October 20, 2014 (aged 93); Thousand Oaks, California, U.S.
- Education: Harvard University; Swarthmore College

Coaching career (HC unless noted)
- 1947-1955: Rose Valley Suburban League, Pa.
- 1950-1955: Suburban Swim Club, Newton Square, Pa.
- 1955-1956: Asst. Coach, Yale University
- 1957-1992: University of Southern California; Los Angeles Athletic Club (LAAC)

Head coaching record
- Overall: 318-31-1 (.917) (USC); Dual meet record

Accomplishments and honors

Championships
- 9 NCAA Championships (USC); 14 AAU Men's National titles (USC); 2 AAU Women's National titles (USC); 17 Pac-10 titles (USC)

Awards
- US Olympic Coach Women (1964); US Olympic Coach Men (1972); NCAA Coach of the Year; 1962 ASCA Coach of the Year; 1975 AAU Swimming Award; 1976 Nat. Colleg.& Scholastic Trophy; CSCAA 100 Greatest Coaches 2021; USC's Peter Dalland Pool; International Swimming Hall of Fame

Peter Daland (April 12, 1921 – October 20, 2014) was an International Swimming Hall of Fame, U.S. Olympic and collegiate swim coach from the United States, best known for coaching the University of Southern California Trojans swim team to nine NCAA championships between 1957 and 1992. Daland started Philadelphia's Suburban Swim Club around 1950, an outstanding youth program, which he coached through 1955, then served briefly as an Assistant Coach at Yale from 1955 to 1956, where he was mentored by Olympic Coach and long serving Yale Head Coach Bob Kiphuth.

== Early life ==
Daland was born in New York City to Elliot and Katherine Daland, but grew up in Philadelphia, where after college, he began a coaching career that spanned over 40 years. Peter's more traditional father was slow to approve his unorthodox choice of careers.

Daland attended Harvard University as did his father, and grandfather, before he enlisted in the United States Army for World War II. After the war, he graduated from Swarthmore College in 1948 and got his first coaching job at the Rose Valley Suburban League in Rose Valley, Pennsylvania, where he won 8 straight Suburban League titles (1947–55). Around 1950, he founded and was the first coach of the Suburban Swim Club, now called the Suburban Seahawks Club in Newtown Square, Pennsylvania and later served as an assistant coach to Bob Kiphuth at Yale University.

In 1956, he decided to take Horace Greeley's advice to head west and became coach at the University of Southern California in Los Angeles and the Los Angeles Athletic Club. Recognizing the future of California swimming, and showing persistence, Daland endured rejection from fifty California clubs that turned down his application. Demonstrating his early success, in 1958, after two years on the USC coaching staff, he returned to Yale with 5 USC Freshmen and won the National AAU Team Title from the New Haven Swim Club.

== Collegiate coaching career ==
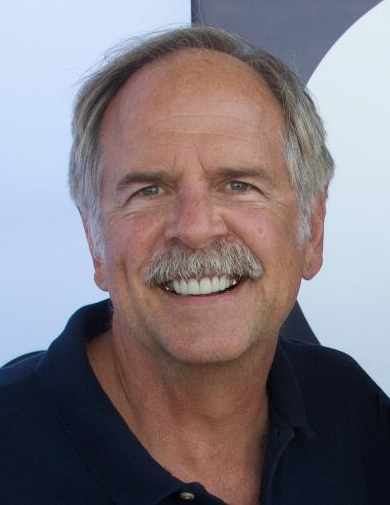
USC Gold medalist John Naber

For 35 years (1957–1992), Daland was the swimming coach for the University of Southern California Trojans, where he led the team to 9 NCAA Championships. Harvard educated, and a graduate of Swarthmore, he was known for bringing the "bearing of an upper crust Eastern sophisticate" to the less stodgy USC campus, and would often come to the swim deck in a white shirt, coat and tie.

He led teams to 14 AAU Men's National titles, and 2 AAU Women's National titles. He is the only coach to have won all three major national team championships—8 NCAA, 14 National AAU Men's, and 2 National AAU Women's (Los Angeles Athletic Club). Specializing in family dynasties, Daland had the good fortune of obtaining championship wins from the brothers Bottom, Devine, Orr, and the House brother and sister act. His Trojan teams won more than 160 dual meets and won more than 100 individual titles, with Daland accumulating an exceptional career record at USC of 318-31-1 in dual meets. By 1974, Daland's record boasted 183 individual national champions.

Some of the most outstanding swimmers he mentored included four time gold medal winner John Naber and American record holders Dave Wharton and Mike O’Brien. He coached International Swimming Hall of Fame Master's swimmer Jim McConica at USC from 1969-1973.

== Olympic coaching ==
Daland coached the U.S. women's swim team at the 1964 Olympics in Tokyo, where his swimmers won 15 of the 24 medals awarded in women's swim events. The women's team won six of eight events. He then coached the US men's team at the 1972 Olympics in Munich, where his men swimmers won 26 of 45 medals awarded in men's events. In those Olympics, Mark Spitz of the United States had a spectacular run, lining up for seven events, winning seven Olympic titles and setting seven world records.

Outstanding Olympians coached by Daland included William Craig, Roy Saari, Murray Rose, Jeff Float, Joe and Mike Bottom and Bruce and Steve Furniss.

== Swimming community roles ==
Daland was active in the swimming community via his roles/positions with FISU, the International University Sports Federation, and ASCA, the American Swimming Coaches Association. He was one of the founders of ASCA, and was inducted into the International Swimming Hall of Fame in 1977. Daland served as a swimming consultant for Philips Petroleum, the sponsor of U. S. Senior Swimming from 1972 to 1982. The pool of USC's Uytengsu Aquatics Center bears his name.

Daland was the founder of the Junior Swimmer newsletter, and co-founded the widely subscribed Swimming World Magazine. Originally little more than a mimeographed journal, Daland began Swimming World in the 1950s with Hall of Fame Yale coach Bob Kiphuth who mentored him in his first College coaching assignment. His work on the journal greatly enhanced Daland's grasp of swimming data for opposing teams, and simplified access to swim times for the coaching community. Better access to swim times helped Dalland and other coaches more effectively assign their swimmers to events, which led them to winning more meets.

Daland was married to former elite German swimmer Ingrid Feuerstack (1942–2017). They had three children, Peter Jr., Bonnie, and Leslie. Leslie won a gold medal in the 900 meter freestyle at the 1986 Goodwill Games in Moscow. Leslie now owns Daland Swim School, which was founded by Ingrid, in Thousand Oaks, California. On October 20, 2014, Peter died in Thousand Oaks, California at the age of 93 of Alzheimer's disease.

== Honors and awards ==
- 1962 ASCA Coach of the Year
- 1964 Olympics Women's Swimming Team Coach for the USA
- 1972 Olympics Men's Swimming Head Coach for the USA
- 1977 AAU Swimming Award recipient

== See also ==
- List of members of the International Swimming Hall of Fame
