= Gustavo Ocampo =

Peruvian swimmer

Personal information
- Born: 26 June 1947 (age 79)

Sport
- Sport: Swimming

Gustavo Ocampo (born 26 June 1947) is a Peruvian former swimmer. He competed in the men's 200 metre butterfly at the 1964 Summer Olympics.
