= Thompson Mann =

American swimmer (1942–2019)

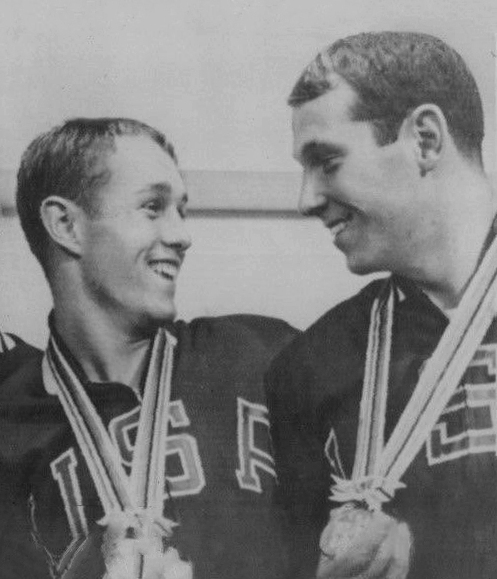
- Mann (right) at the 1964 Olympics

Personal information
- Full name: Harold Thompson Mann
- National team: United States
- Born: December 1, 1942 Norfolk, Virginia, U.S.
- Died: April 4, 2019 (aged 76) Amesbury, Massachusetts, U.S.
- Height: 6 ft 1 in (1.85 m)
- Weight: 170 lb (77 kg)

Sport
- Sport: Swimming
- Strokes: Backstroke
- Club: Country Club of Virginia; North Carolina Athletic Club; New Jersey Swim Association
- College team: University of North Carolina
- Coach: Pat Earey (North Carolina); Bob Alexander (New Jersey Swim Assoc.)
Medal record
Representing the United States
Olympic Games
Gold medal – first place	1964 Tokyo	4×100 m medley relay

Harold Thompson Mann (December 1, 1942 – April 4, 2019) was an American competition swimmer for the University of North Carolina, a 1964 Tokyo Olympic 4x100-meter medley swimming gold medalist, and a world record-holder in the 100-meter backstroke. After graduating pre-med from North Carolina, he went to the medical school of Virginia, and completed a residency and practice in San Francisco. In 1984 he returned to his home state to establish a practice in internal medicine in the greater Richmond area.

== High school era swimming ==
Born December 1, 1942 in Norfolk, Virginia to Dr. E.M. Mann and wife Evelyn, Thompson Mann began swimming at an early age with the Boy's Club of Norfolk and practiced on his own at the Old Dominion College pool. Mann's family moved from Norfolk to the greater Richmond area when he was quite young. He grew up around Hickory, Virginia, seven miles South of Chesapeake where he went to Chesapeake's Great Bridge High. At Great Bridge High, he served as senior class president, and Sports Editor for the yearbook. At his June, 1960 graduation from Great Bridge High, he received "The Sons of American Revolution Citizenship Award". Mann was a Co-captain of the Junior Varsity basketball team, until a back injury sidelined him for a year, but enabled him to focus on swimming after his recovery. Great Bridge High had no swim team at the time, but Mann swam for Richmond's Country Club of Virginia (CCV) swim program from an early age. Due to the hour long commute from Hickory to Richmond, he swam most intensely with CCV during the summer months.

By late 1959, Mann held national records in the short course 100-meter backstroke, and the 100-yard backstroke, as well as five state records.

At the Tidewater Invitational Swimming meet as a 17-year old High School Senior, on April 2, 1960, he won the Junior National Championship race in the 100-yard backstroke event. His time of 1:00.9, was only .4 seconds slower than the national record set in 1951. In 1956, Mann received the award for outstanding intermediate boy swimmer for the state of Virginia, and in 1958 and 1959 received the same award for the outstanding Senior boy swimmer in Virginia.

== North Carolina University ==
While attending University of North Carolina from 1960-64, Mann was a three-time all American under the direction of Head Coach Pat Earey. Earey, an exceptional coach, won 71.1 percent of the dual meets he coached at North Carolina between 1957-74. Mann was considered by many as arguably the finest men's swimmer in Carolina history. During Mann's time swimming with the university, Mann helped lead Carolina to ACC championships in 1961, 1963, and 1964. Mann won 10 ACC titles and seven times received All-America honors in his best three seasons from 1961-64. North Carolina swimmers were ACC co-champions in his final season at the university and were tied for sixth place that year at the NCAA championships.

Coach Robert Alexander, known as "Mr. A." coached Mann in preparation for the 1964 Olympics at the unique open water quarry of the New Jersey Swim Association. Alexander was careful to limit most of his athletes to 2000 yards a day to prevent injury, though he may have exceeded this quota somewhat preparing athletes for the Olympics.

== 1964 Tokyo Olympic gold medal ==
Mann competed at the 1964 Summer Olympics in Tokyo, Japan, where he received a gold medal swimming the lead-off backstroke leg for the winning U.S. team in the 4×100-meter medley relay. Mann and his relay teammates Bill Craig (breaststroke), Fred Schmidt (butterfly) and Steve Clark set a new world record of 3:58.4 – and Mann set an individual world record in the 100-meter backstroke swimming his leg in 59.6 seconds. In a competitive swimming milestone, in his Olympic event, Mann became the first person to break the one-minute barrier when he clocked his time of 59.6 on the opening leg of his 4x100 Olympic medley relay final.

In 1965, Mann won the national indoor and outdoor titles in both the 100 and 200 yd backstroke, setting a world's best time and American record of 52.5 seconds in the 100 yd. event.

=== Later life ===
After North Carolina, Mann studied at Richmond's Medical College of Virginia, and completed an internal medicine residency at the University of California at San Francisco. After his residency, he remained in San Francisco and practiced medicine, eventually moving back home in 1982 to establish a practice in the Richmond, Virginia area.

Mann died on April 4, 2019 in Amesbury, Massachusetts.

=== Honors ===
He was inducted into the International Swimming Hall of Fame in 1984, and the Virginia Sports Hall of Fame in 1988. Mann was named one of the 50 greatest men's swimmers in Atlantic Coast Conference (ACC) history in 2002.

== See also ==
- List of members of the International Swimming Hall of Fame
- List of Olympic medalists in swimming (men)
- List of University of North Carolina at Chapel Hill alumni
- List of University of North Carolina at Chapel Hill Olympians
- World record progression 100 metres backstroke
- World record progression 4 × 100 metres medley relay
