= Werner Freitag =

German swimmer (born 1946)

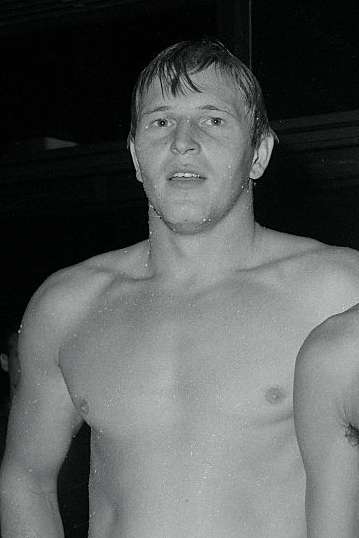
- Freitag in 1967

Personal information
- Born: 4 January 1946 (age 80) Niedersachsen, Germany
- Height: 184 cm (6 ft 0 in)
- Weight: 83 kg (183 lb)

Sport
- Sport: Swimming
- Strokes: Butterfly
- Club: ATS Bremerhaven

Werner Freitag (born 4 January 1946) is a German former butterfly swimmer who won the national 200 m title in 1963 and 1965. He competed in the 200 m event at the 1964 Summer Olympics and in the 100 m event the 1968 Summer Olympics, but failed to reach the finals. His daughter Meike also became an Olympic swimmer.
