= Atsushi Obayashi =

Japanese swimmer

Personal information
- Born: 24 February 1943 (age 83)

Sport
- Sport: Swimming
- Strokes: butterfly

Atsushi Obayashi (大林 敦, Ōbayashi Atsushi; born 24 February 1943) is a Japanese former butterfly swimmer. He competed in the men's 200 metre butterfly at the 1964 Summer Olympics.
