= Miguel Torres (swimmer) =

Spanish swimmer

Personal information
- Full name: Miguel Torres Bernades
- Born: 24 January 1946 (age 80) Sabadell, Barcelona, Spain

Sport
- Sport: Swimming
Medal record
Men's swimming
Representing Spain
Mediterranean Games
Gold medal – first place	1963 Naples	1500 m freestyle
European Championships
Silver medal – second place	1962 Leipzig	1500 m freestyle

Miguel Torres Bernades (Note: In this Spanish name, the first or paternal surname is Torres and the second or maternal family name is Bernades.) (born 24 January 1946) is a Spanish former freestyle and medley swimmer who competed in the 1960 Summer Olympics, in the 1964 Summer Olympics, and in the 1968 Summer Olympics.
