= Téodoro Capriles =

Venezuelan swimmer (born 1945)

Personal information
- Born: 17 February 1945 (age 81) Caracas, Venezuela

Sport
- Sport: Swimming

Téodoro Capriles (born 17 February 1945) is a Venezuelan former swimmer. He competed in two events at the 1964 Summer Olympics.
