= Carlos van der Maath =

Argentine swimmer

Personal information
- Born: 24 May 1946 (age 80) Buenos Aires, Argentina

Sport
- Sport: Swimming
Medal record
Representing Argentina
Pan American Games
Silver medal – second place	1963 Sao Paulo	4x100m medley relay

Carlos van der Maath (born 24 May 1946) is an Argentine former swimmer. He competed at the 1964 Summer Olympics and the 1968 Summer Olympics.
