= Nazario Padrón =

Spanish swimmer

Personal information
- Full name: Nazario Padrón Arencibia
- Born: 16 October 1945 (age 80) Las Palmas, Spain

Sport
- Sport: Swimming
Medal record
Men's swimming
Representing Spain
Universiade
Silver medal – second place	1963 Porto Alegre	200 m breaststroke
Mediterranean Games
Bronze medal – third place	1967 Tunis	200 m breaststroke

Nazario Padrón Arencibia (Note: In this Spanish name, the first or paternal surname is Padrón and the second or maternal family name is Arencibia.) (born 16 October 1945) is a Spanish former breaststroke swimmer. He competed in two events at the 1964 Summer Olympics.
