= Bill Craig (swimmer) =

American swimmer (1945–2017)

William Craig
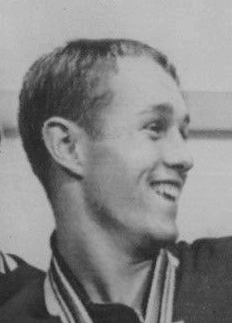
- Craig at the 1964 Olympics

Personal information
- Full name: William Norval Craig
- Nickname: "Bill"
- National team: United States
- Born: January 16, 1945 Culver City, California, U.S.
- Died: January 1, 2017 (aged 71) Orange, California, U.S.
- Height: 5 ft 11 in (1.80 m)
- Weight: 170 lb (77 kg)

Sport
- Sport: Swimming
- Strokes: Breaststroke
- College team: University of Southern California
- Coach: Peter Daland (USC); James Counsilman (64 Olympics)
Medal record
Representing the United States
Olympic Games
Gold medal – first place	1964 Tokyo	4×100 m medley
Pan American Games
Gold medal – first place	1963 São Paulo	4×100 m medley

William Norval Craig (January 16, 1945 – January 1, 2017) was an American competition swimmer, for the University of Southern California, an Olympic champion, and a world record-holder.

== Early life ==
Craig was born on January 16, 1945 to John Craig Norval and Marian Charlotte Nuppnau in Culver City, California. He spent his childhood in Glendale, and took to the water when his family first owned a house with a swimming pool. Before High School, he played Little League baseball, but changed his sport after beginning swimming lessons at the direction of his mother. At Hoover High School in Glendale he was an exceptional swimming competitor, making All CIF in his sophomore, junior and senior years, and leading Hoover's swim team to the State Championship.

== Swimming for USC ==
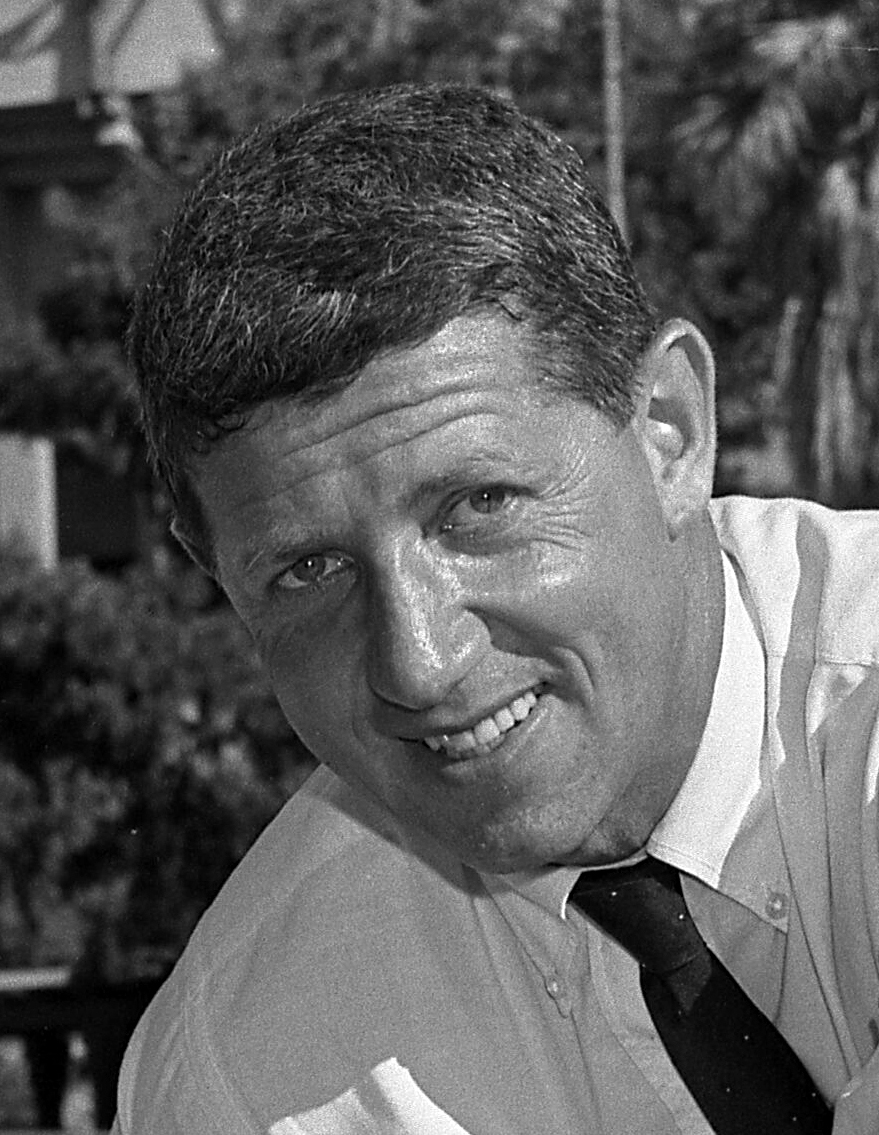
USC Coach Peter Daland, '64

At the University of Southern California, where he graduated in 1967, he swam for Hall of Fame and Olympic Coach Peter Daland. Swimming for USC, he won three AAU and three NCAA titles. He received a gold medal at the Pan-American Games in 1963 in Sao Paulo, Brazil as a member of the medley relay team.

== 1964 Olympic gold medal ==
Craig represented the United States at the 1964 Summer Olympics in Tokyo, where he won a gold medal by swimming the breaststroke leg for the first-place U.S. team in the men's 4×100-meter medley relay. Craig and his teammates Thompson Mann (backstroke), Fred Schmidt (butterfly) and Steve Clark (freestyle) set a new medley relay world record of 3:58.4. Though the 100-meter freestyle had been swum well below one minute by 1964, Bill's American relay team set a time that was memorable as it was the first to break four minutes for the event which included all four competitive strokes.

== Post-Olympics ==
After leaving competitive swimming, Craig spent a number of years in Hawaii. He first landed there on his way to the Tokyo Olympics and was determined to come back. He made many visits and particularly enjoyed the Outrigger Canoe Club in Oahu.

He was the owner of Billy’s at the Beach, a restaurant in Newport Beach, California, which was a Hawaiian-style eatery based on concepts he found in his favorite locale, the Hawaiian Islands. Craig also worked in other roles, including finance and teaching.

Craig was last married to Patty Craig around 2000, with whom he had a son Christian; he also has a son Rick and daughter Kimber from a previous marriage. In 1967, he was formerly married to 1964 Olympic swimmer Jeanne Hallock, whom he met at USC. Hallock also competed in the 1964 Tokyo Olympics, as did Craig where she swam in the 4x100-meter freestyle relay preliminaries.

A former resident of Newport Beach, Craig died at the age of 71 on January 1, 2017 at Hoag Hospital, outside Newport Beach, in Orange County, California from complications of pneumonia, and was cremated.

== See also ==
- List of Olympic medalists in swimming (men)
- List of University of Southern California people
- World record progression 4 × 100 metres medley relay
