= Walter Richardson (swimmer) =

American swimmer (born 1943)

Personal information
- Full name: Dr. Walter Pierce Richardson
- Nickname: "Wally"
- National team: United States
- Born: April 1, 1943 (age 83) Chicago, Illinois, U.S.
- Occupation: Physician
- Height: 5 ft 11 in (1.80 m)
- Weight: 165 lb (75 kg)

Sport
- Sport: Swimming
- Strokes: Butterfly
- Club: Gopher Swim Club; Minneapolis, MN
- College team: University of Minnesota
- Coach: Bill Heusner, Bob Mowerson (University Minnesota); James Counsilman (64 Olympics)
Medal record
Men's swimming
Representing the United States
Pan American Games
| Gold medal – first place | 1963 São Paulo | 4×100 m medley |

Walter "Wally" Pierce Richardson (born April 1, 1943) is an American former competition swimmer and former world record-holder specializing in the butterfly stroke, who competed in the preliminary heat swimming the breaststroke leg for the men's 4×100-meter medley relay at the 1964 Tokyo Olympics that set an Olympic record time of 4:05.1. Advancing to the next round, the finals team without Richardson won a gold medal in world record time. He did not receive a medal because only those swimmers who competed in the event final were medal-eligible under the 1964 Olympic rules.

Walter Richardson was born April 1, 1943 in Chicago, Illinois.

== University of Minnesota ==
Graduating in 1965, Richardson attended and competed for the University of Minnesota under Coaches William Heusner and beginning in 1963, Hall of Fame Coach Bob Mowerson, who swam for the University of Michigan under Matthew Mann. Distinguishing himself in his first year of competition, Richardson won five titles in the Big-10 Conference. In 1963-4, Richardson captured NCAA titles in the 100 butterfly, and in 1964 captured an NCAA title in the 200 butterfly. In conference tournaments, he won Big-10 titles in 1963-4 in the 100 butterfly and in 1964 captured a Big-10 title in the 200 butterfly. At AAU Meets, Richardson won the National Outdoor 100 butterfly in 1963-64.

While attending the University of Minnesota, during summer breaks and off-season he represented the Gopher Swim Club, in Minneapolis.

== 1963 Medley relay world record ==
Richardson was part of a four man team that established a long course world record of 4:00.1 in Osaka, Japan, on August 24, 1963, in the 4×100 meter medley relay that held until October 16, 1964.

At the late August, 1964 Olympic swimming trials in Astoria, New York, at the Astoria Pool, Richardson placed first in the finals of the 100-meter butterfly, with a time of 57.8, qualifying him to compete with the US team at the 1964 Tokyo Olympics.

== 1964 Tokyo Olympics ==
Richardson competed in the 1964 Summer Olympics in Tokyo, Japan, under Hall of Fame Olympic Head Coach James Counsilman, where he swam the butterfly leg for the gold medal-winning U.S. team in the preliminary heats of the men's 4×100-meter medley relay. With an exceedingly strong team of eight, the American team dominated the event. For the preliminary 4x100-meter medley round, Rich McGeagh swam the lead-off backstroke leg, Richards swam the butterfly leg, fellow University of Minnesota swimmer Virg Luken swam the breaststroke leg, and Bob Bennett swam anchor freestyle, setting a new Olympic record of 4:05.1, despite being only a preliminary swim. The finals team of Thompson Mann at Backstroke, Bill Craig at breaststroke, Fred Schmidt at Butterfly, replacing Richardson, and Steve Clark as freestyle anchor completed their swim with a world record of 3:58.4, taking the gold medal. Steve Clark swam his 100-freestyle leg in a world record time of 52.4. The Unified team from Germany took the Silver medal with a 4:01.6 and the team from Australia took the bronze with a time of 4:02.3.

In AAU tournaments, Richardson captured the outdoor 100 fly championship in 1963-64.

=== 1963 Pan Am Games ===
In international competition, representing the U.S. team at the 1963 Pan American games in Sao Paulo, Brazil, he won a gold medal in the 4×100 m medley.

=== Later life ===
Richardson continued to swim and train, and participated in United States Masters Swimming, as a member of the Missouri Valley Masters. Richarson had his top age group times with United States Swimming between 2012-2014, where he finished in ten places in age group competition for each year from 68-71 for events that included the 400-medley, 400-freestyle, and 50, 100, and 200 butterfly. He had two national age group second place finishes in the 200 butterfly past the age of 70, and a second place national age-group finish in the 400 medley at the age of 69.

Richardson had a career as a physician.

=== Honors ===
Richardson was admitted to the University of Minnesota Aquatic Hall of Fame in 1998. In Conference Honors, in 1965 he was a recipient of the Big Ten Student Athlete Award.

== See also ==
- List of University of Minnesota people
- World record progression 4 × 100 metres medley relay
