= Fred Schmidt =

American swimmer (born 1943)

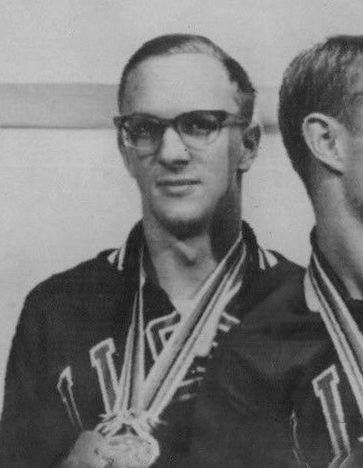
- Schmidt at the 1964 Olympics

Personal information
- Full name: Frederick Weber Schmidt
- Nickname: "Fred"
- National team: United States
- Born: October 23, 1943 (age 82) Evanston, Illinois, U.S.
- Height: 6 ft 2 in (188 cm)
- Weight: 185 lb (84 kg)

Sport
- Sport: Swimming
- Strokes: Butterfly
- College team: Indiana University (IU)
- Coach: Dave Robertson (New Trier High); James Counsilman (IU, 64 Olympics)
Medal record
Representing the United States
Olympic Games
Gold medal – first place	1964 Tokyo	4×100 m medley
Bronze medal – third place	1964 Tokyo	200 m butterfly
Pan American Games
Silver medal – second place	1963 São Paulo	200 m butterfly

Frederick Weber Schmidt (born October 23, 1943) is an American former competition swimmer who competed for Indiana University. He was a 1964 Tokyo Olympic champion in the Men's 4×100 m medley, and a bronze medalist in 200 m butterfly. He is a former world record-holder in men's 100-meter butterfly, holding the record from 1961 to 1962.

== Early life ==
Schmidt was born October 23,1943 in Evanston, Illinois. He began swimming competitively at New Trier High School in Winnetka, Illinois under accomplished coach Dave Robertson, who coached New Trier for thirty years from 1946-1976. In 1961, New Trier won the Illinois high school State Championship. As one of the most outstanding high school teams of the decade, five New Trier Swim team members held National records. The New Trier High team placed third in the Amateur Athletic Union (AAU) National swimming championships that year behind the teams from Yale and the University of Southern California. A nationally recognized coach, Robertson's teams at New Trier and later Illinois's Waubonsie Valley High School between 1976-86 won fourteen Illinois State titles. Basing his coaching on Roger Bannister's speed in breaking the four-minute mile, Robertson focused on interval training, as had Bannister, to make shorter, but more intense practices that would more effectively drop his swimmers' times.

Dale Kiefer, a breaststroker, freestyler Dave Lyons, and backstroke specialist Roger Goettsche swam with Schmidt at New Trier High, and later swam for Yale.

== Indiana University ==
Schmidt swam for Indiana University under James "Doc" Counsilman's Indiana Hoosiers swimming and diving team. He lettered at Indiana in consecutive years from 1963-65, where he captured three Big Ten titles swimming butterfly events. In 1965, he was an NCAA champion in the 100 and 200 butterfly.

== 1964 Tokyo Olympics ==
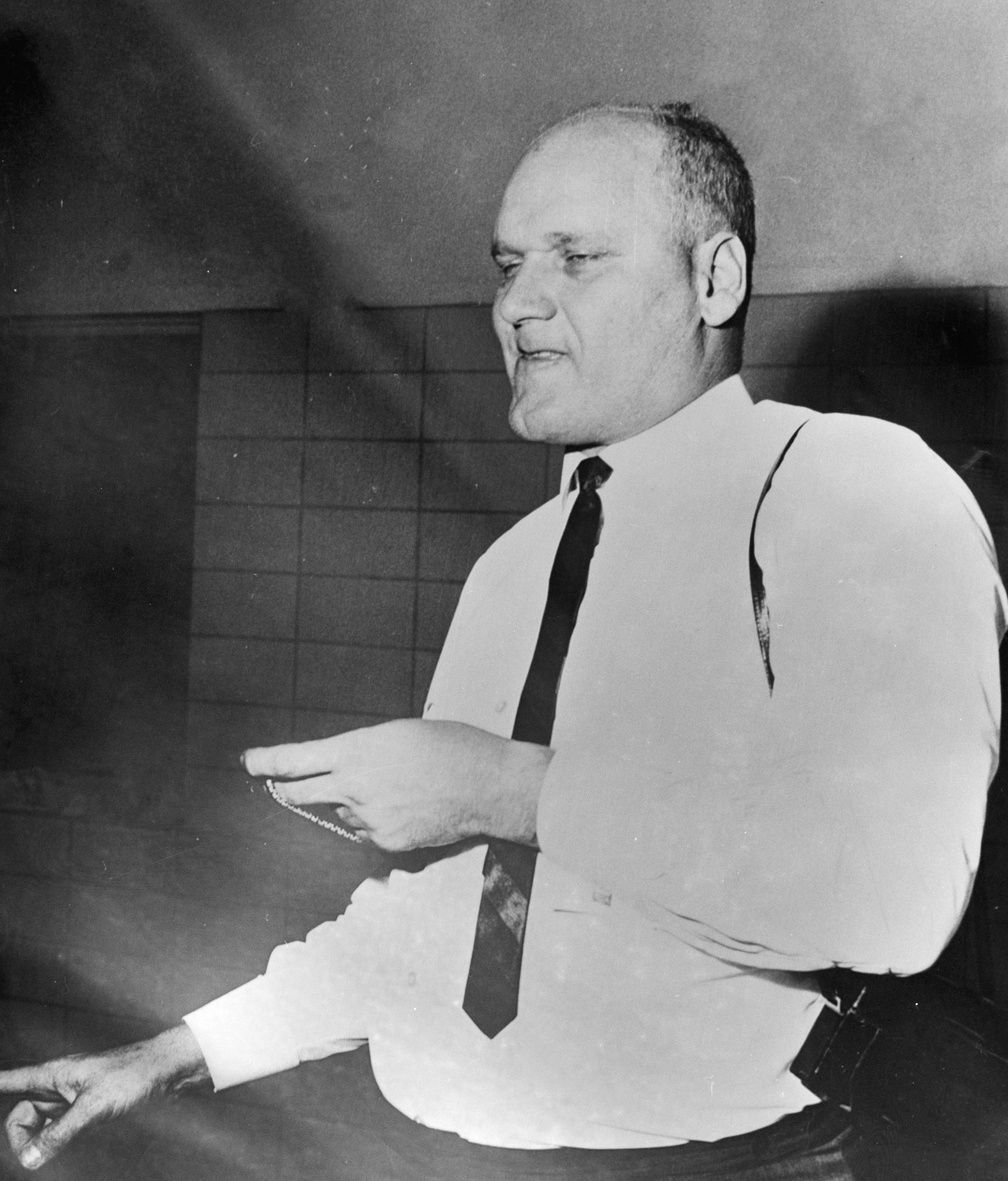
James Counsilman

At the 1964 Summer Olympics in Tokyo, Japan under head Olympic Coach James Counsilman, Schmidt received a gold medal by swimming the butterfly leg for the winning U.S. team in the 4×100-meter medley relay, setting a new world record of 3:58.4 with teammates Thompson Mann (backstroke), Bill Craig (breaststroke), and Steve Clark (freestyle). The relay team from Germany won the silver medal with a time of 4:01.6, and the Australian team took the bronze with a combined time of 4:02.3.

Schmidt also received a bronze medal for his third-place finish in the 200-meter butterfly, clocking a time of 2:09.3. Favorites Kevin Barry of Australia took the gold with a time of 2:06.6, and Carl Robie of the US team took the silver medal with a time of 2:07.5.

Schmidt held the world record in 100-meter butterfly of 58.6 seconds from August 20, 1961 to April 24, 1962.

=== Honors ===
Schmidt was a 2005 inductee to the Indiana University Hall of Fame.

== See also ==
- List of Indiana University (Bloomington) people
- List of Olympic medalists in swimming (men)
- World record progression 100 metres butterfly
- World record progression 4 × 100 metres medley relay

Records
Preceded by Lance Larson	Men's 100-meter butterfly world record-holder (long course); August 20, 1961 – April 24, 1962	Succeeded by Luis Nicolao
