= Sandy Gilchrist =

Canadian former swimmer (born 1945)

Personal information
- Full name: John Alexander Gilchrist
- Nickname: "Sandy"
- National team: Canada
- Born: November 9, 1945 (age 80) Ocean Falls, British Columbia, Canada
- Height: 1.83 m (6 ft 0 in)
- Weight: 79 kg (174 lb)

Sport
- Sport: Swimming
- Strokes: Freestyle, medley
Medal record
Men's swimming
Representing Canada
British Empire and Commonwealth Games
Gold medal – first place	1966 Kingston	4×110 yd medley
Silver medal – second place	1962 Perth	4×110 yd freestyle
Silver medal – second place	1962 Perth	4×220 yd freestyle
Silver medal – second place	1966 Kingston	1650 yd freestyle
Silver medal – second place	1966 Kingston	4×110 yd freestyle
Silver medal – second place	1966 Kingston	4×220 yd freestyle
Bronze medal – third place	1966 Kingston	440 yd medley
Pan American Games
Silver medal – second place	1963 São Paulo	1500 m freestyle
Silver medal – second place	1963 São Paulo	4×200 m freestyle
Silver medal – second place	1967 Winnipeg	4×100 m freestyle
Silver medal – second place	1967 Winnipeg	4×200 m freestyle
Silver medal – second place	1967 Winnipeg	4×100 m medley
Bronze medal – third place	1963 São Paulo	400 m freestyle
Bronze medal – third place	1963 São Paulo	4×100 m medley
Bronze medal – third place	1967 Winnipeg	100 m freestyle
Bronze medal – third place	1967 Winnipeg	200 m medley
Bronze medal – third place	1967 Winnipeg	400 m medley

John Alexander Gilchrist (born November 9, 1945) is a Canadian former swimmer.

== Swimming career ==
Gilchrist competed in the 1964 Summer Olympics and 1968 Summer Olympics, with his best performance being in 1968, finishing fourth in the 4×200 metres relay. Despite being of Canadian nationality he won the ASA National British Championships over the 1,650 yards freestyle in 1965 and the 440 yards medley title in 1965.

== Family ==
Glichrist's daughter, Kaleigh Gilchrist, is an Olympian, who represented Team USA in water polo at the 2016 Summer Olympics and 2020 Summer Olympics.

== See also ==
- List of Commonwealth Games medallists in swimming (men)
