= Álvaro Pires (swimmer) =

Brazilian swimmer and water polo player

Personal information
- Full name: Álvaro Roberto de Ávila Pires
- Born: 13 August 1941 (age 84) Rio de Janeiro, Rio de Janeiro, Brazil
- Height: 1.85 m (6 ft 1 in)
- Weight: 84 kg (185 lb)

Sport
- Sport: Swimming
- Strokes: Freestyle

Álvaro Roberto de Ávila Pires (born 13 August 1941 in Rio de Janeiro) was a Brazilian sportsman. He competed in two Olympics. He represented Brazil in swimming at the 1964 Olympics and in water polo at the 1968 Olympics.

At the 1963 Pan American Games, in São Paulo, he finished 4th in the 4×100-metre medley, and 5th in the 100-metre freestyle.

At the 1964 Summer Olympics in Tokyo, he swam the 100-metre freestyle and the 4×100-metre medley, not reaching the finals.

At the 1968 Summer Olympics in Mexico City, he finished 13th with the Brazilian Water Polo team.
