= Daniel Sherry =

Canadian swimmer (born 1946)

Dan Sherry
Personal information
- Full name: Daniel John Sherry
- Born: 2 April 1946 (age 80)
- Height: 180 cm (5 ft 11 in)
- Weight: 76 kg (168 lb)

Sport
- Sport: Swimming
- Club: North York Lions Club
Medal record
Men's swimming
Representing Canada
Pan American Games
Bronze medal – third place	1963 São Paulo	100 m freestyle
Bronze medal – third place	1963 São Paulo	4 x 100 m medley relay

Daniel John Sherry (born 2 April 1946) is a male Canadian former swimmer. Sherry competed in five events at the 1964 Summer Olympics.

He broke the world record for 110 yards butterfly in 1965, on his way to winning the ASA National British Championships after setting a time of 58.1 sec, the event was 'open' to all nationalities. He also won the 220 yards butterfly title.
