= Joaquín Pujol =

Spanish swimmer

Personal information
- Born: 21 May 1946 (age 80)

Sport
- Sport: Swimming
Medal record
Representing Spain
Mediterranean Games
Bronze medal – third place	1963 Naples	200m butterfly

Joaquín Pujol (born 21 May 1946) is a Spanish former butterfly swimmer. He competed in two events at the 1964 Summer Olympics.
