= Luis Nicolao =

Argentine swimmer

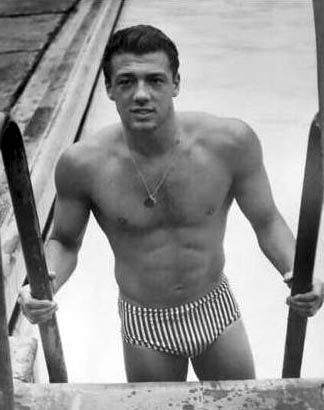
- Nicola c. 1960

Personal information
- Full name: Luis Alberto Nicolao Yanuzzi
- Nickname: Nico
- Born: June 28, 1944 (age 82) Buenos Aires, Argentina
- Height: 1.82 m (6 ft 0 in)
- Weight: 74 kg (163 lb)

Sport
- Sport: Swimming
- Strokes: Freestyle, Butterfly
- Club: Ateneo de la Juventud
- Coach: Alberto "Profe" Carranza
Medal record
Men's swimming
Representing Argentina
Pan American Games
Silver medal – second place	1963 São Paulo	4x100 m medley
Bronze medal – third place	1963 São Paulo	200 m butterfly
Bronze medal – third place	1967 Winnipeg	100 m butterfly
Bronze medal – third place	1967 Winnipeg	4x100 m freestyle
Bronze medal – third place	1967 Winnipeg	4x200 m freestyle

Luis Alberto Nicolao (born June 28, 1944 in Buenos Aires) is a retired butterfly swimmer from Argentina, who in 1962 twice broke the world record in the men's 100 metres butterfly (long course).

== World records ==
Trained and coached by the winningest Argentinean coach "Profe" Alberto Carranza, Nicolao traveled to Rio de Janeiro with great help from a long time Carranza's friend "Pepe" Caraballo. Despite going too fast in the first 50 meters he broke Fred Schmidt’s world record at 58.4 in the salt water Guanabara pool on 24 April 1962. Carranza knew that Nicolao could go even faster if the first 50 meters were more measured, so he went back to Pepe Caraballo and others to assist and support their stay in Rio for a couple more days in order to try a second time. This resulted in a much better race and the world record was lowered to 57.0 on 27 April 1962. Five years later US swimmer Mark Spitz broke Nicolao's top time.

Records
Preceded by (United States) Fred Schmidt	Men's 100 metre butterfly world record holder (long course); April 24, 1962 – July 31, 1967	Succeeded by (United States) Mark Spitz
Awards
Preceded by (Argentina) Rodolfo Hossinger	Olimpia de Oro; 1961	Succeeded by (Argentina) Norma Baylon
