= Steve Clark (swimmer) =

American swimmer (1943–2026)

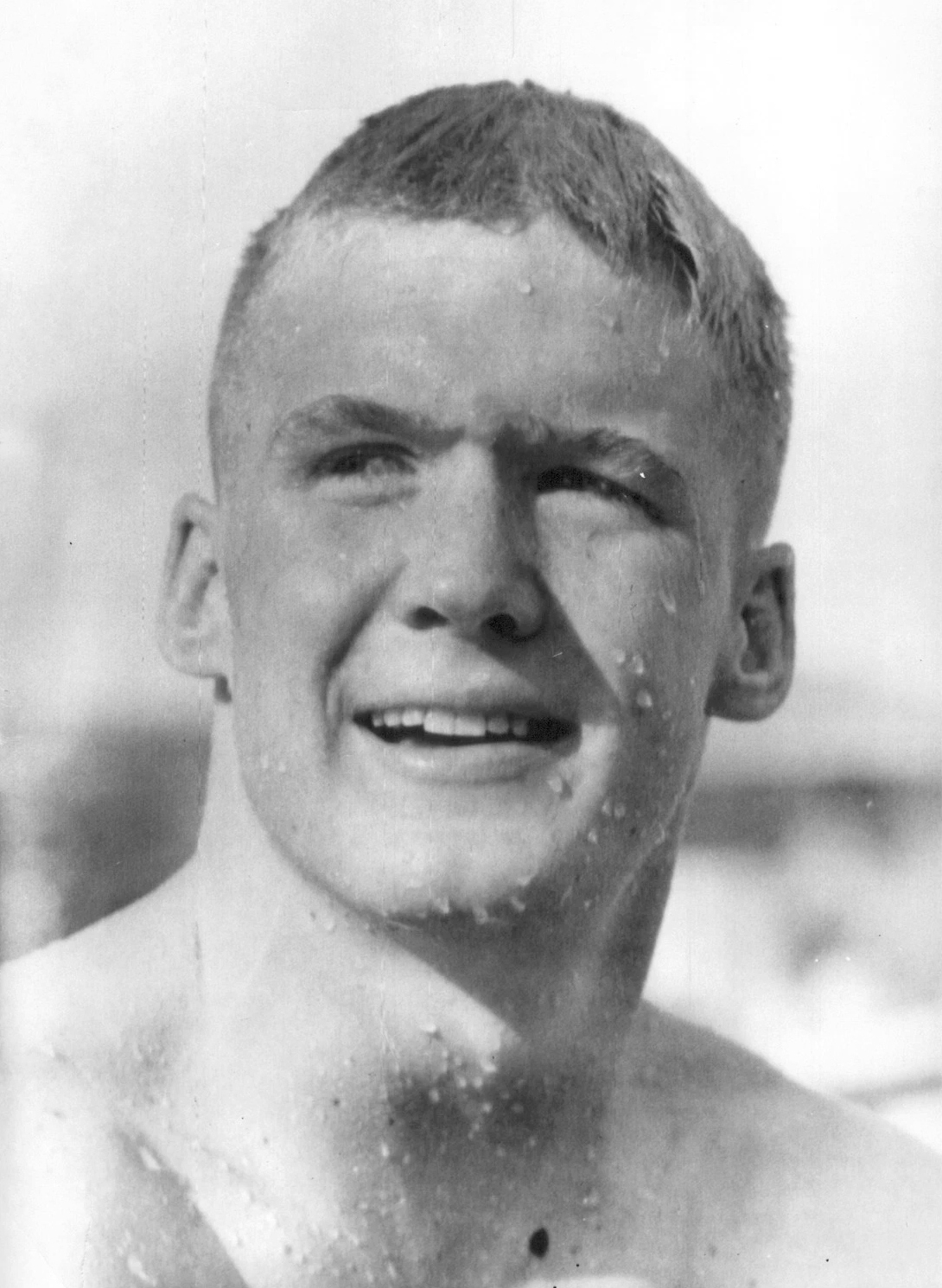
- Clark in 1961

Personal information
- Born: June 17, 1943 Oakland, California, U.S.
- Died: April 14, 2026 (aged 82) Larkspur, California, U.S.
- Height: 5 ft 11 in (180 cm)
- Weight: 148 lb (67 kg)

Sport
- Country: United States
- Sport: Swimming
- Strokes: Freestyle
- Club: Santa Clara Swim Club
- College team: Yale University
- Coach: George Haines (Santa Clara Swim Club); Philip Moriarty (Yale)
Medal record
Representing the United States
Olympic Games
Gold medal – first place	1964 Tokyo	4×100 m freestyle relay
Gold medal – first place	1964 Tokyo	4×200 m freestyle relay
Gold medal – first place	1964 Tokyo	4×100 m medley relay
Pan American Games
Gold medal – first place	1963 São Paulo	100 m freestyle

Stephen Edward Clark (June 17, 1943 – April 14, 2026) was an American competition swimmer for Yale University, Olympic champion, and onetime world record-holder.

Clark attended and swam for Los Altos High School under Hall of Fame Coach Nort Thornton Jr., who would later coach the University of California Berkeley. He qualified for the Olympic team in 1960, while still attending High School. Demonstrating his early mastery of the event, at the March 1961, AAU National Indoor Swimming Championships in New Haven, Connecticut, Clark set an all-time age group record in the 100-yard freestyle of 46.7. With exceptional talent, the Los Altos High School team was considered strong enough to compete with many Varsity college teams, and competed against the Stanford Freshman team in 1961.

== Yale University ==
Clark attended Yale University, where he swam for coach Philip Moriarty's Yale Bulldogs swimming and diving team in National Collegiate Athletic Association (NCAA) and Ivy League competition. During his tenure at Yale, he won five NCAA titles. He also captured six individual and five AAU relay championships while swimming for the Santa Clara Swim Club, under Hall of Fame Coach George Haines. Clark was the Santa Clara Club's first outstanding male swimmer, and the first of many outstanding swimmers mentored by Haines. A sprint specialist with exceptionally efficient flip turns, he set nine world records, but would have set more as short course records were not accepted for world records at the time. As a senior, he was the Yale swim team captain; he graduated from Yale with his bachelor's degree in 1964. In 2005, he donated one of his three Olympic gold medals to his alma mater.

== 1960 Olympics ==
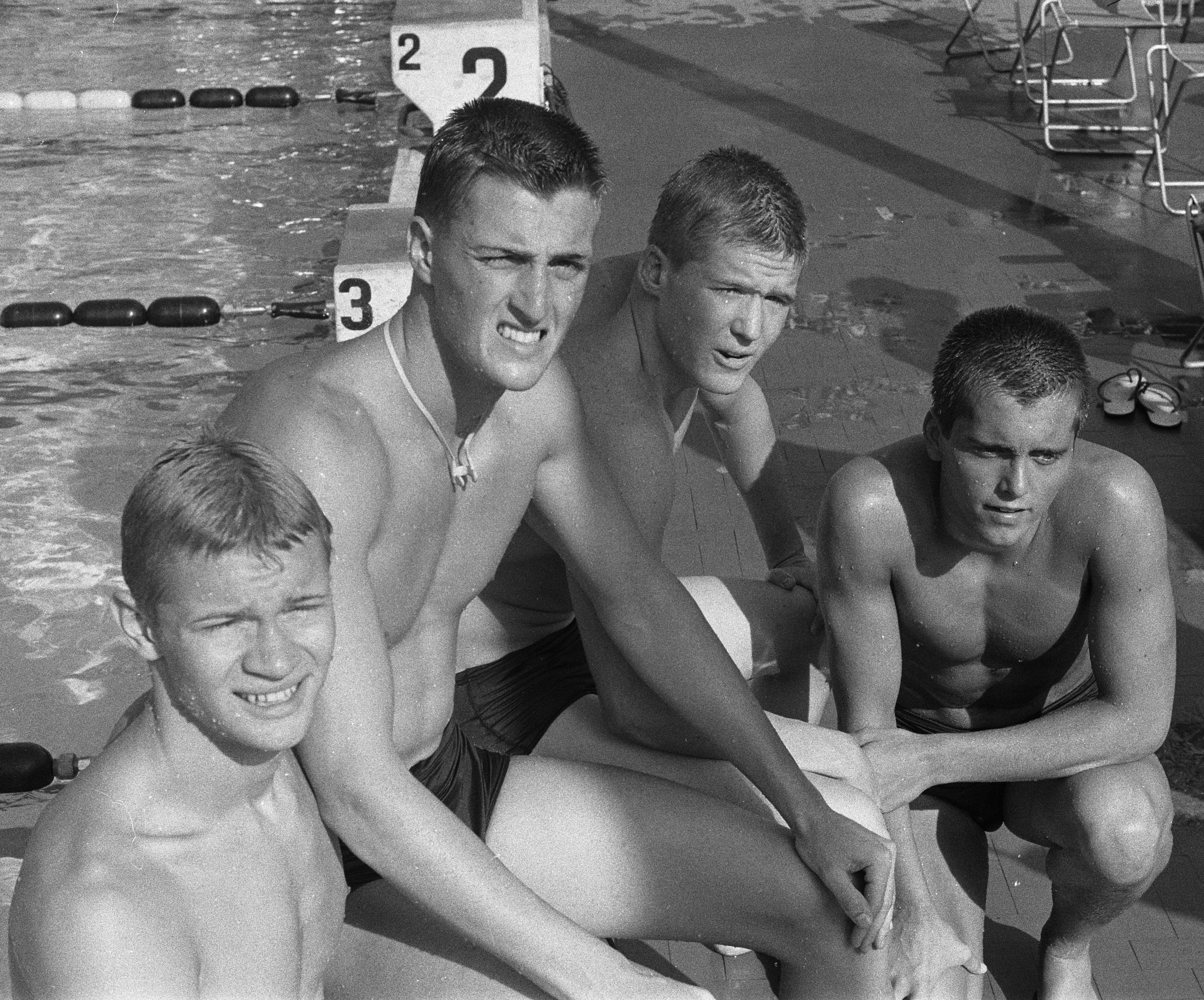
Bennett, Hait, Clark, Gillanders after 4×100-meter medley Olympic record, '60 Olympics.

At the 1960 Summer Olympics in Rome, Clark swam for the first-place U.S. relay teams in the preliminary heats of the men's 4×200-meter freestyle relay and men's 4×100-meter medley relay. Both American relay teams won gold medals, but Clark was ineligible for a medal under the Olympic swimming rules in effect in 1960 because he did not compete in the event finals.

He won his first international gold medal at the 1963 Pan American Games in São Paulo, Brazil, winning the men's 100-metre freestyle in a time of 54.7 seconds, and narrowly edging American swimmer Steven Jackman (54.8 seconds).

== 1964 Olympics ==
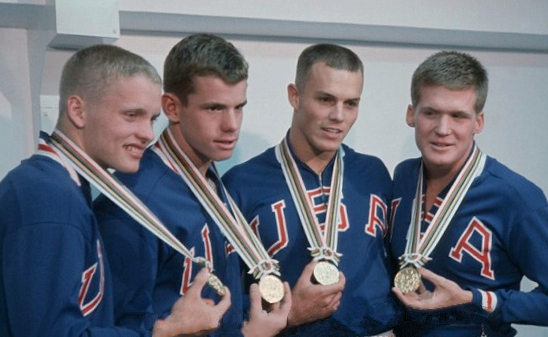
Schollander, Ilman, Austin and Clark display gold medals at 1964 Olympics

At the 1964, U.S. Olympic trials, Clark had developed tendinitis in his shoulder, and was only able to make the team as a member of relays, though he would meet with great success at the Olympic finals.

After travelling with the team to Tokyo for the 1964 Summer Olympics, Clark won three gold medals in record times as a member of three highly competitive U.S. relay teams. His first win in the 4×100-meter freestyle, was a world record with a time of 3:33.2. Clark's individual 100 freestyle leg was a world record, and one of his most notable swims, as the fastest leg of the relay with a time of 52.9 seconds.

Clark also won gold in the 4×200-meter freestyle with a world record combined time of 7:52.1.

His final gold was in the 4×100-meter medley with a world record time of 3:58.4.

After Yale, Clark enrolled at Harvard Law School and authored a widely selling book on swimming, entitled Competitive Swimming As I See It.

He was inducted into the International Swimming Hall of Fame as an "Honor Swimmer" in 1966.

== Depression ==
Clark faced depression that he and many Olympians experience when their careers come to an end. The symptoms peak every four years during Winter and Summer Olympic Games. This is called Gold Medal Syndrome. In 2012, in an unpublished essay he wrote he was feeling depressed between 1966 the year he retired and 1996 for 30 years and "faked feeling normal".

== Death ==
Clark died from complications of Parkinson's disease on April 14, 2026, at the age of 82, his wife Betsy Clark said

== See also ==
- List of members of the International Swimming Hall of Fame
- List of multiple Olympic gold medalists
- List of multiple Olympic gold medalists at a single Games
- List of Olympic medalists in swimming (men)
- List of Yale University people
- World record progression 100 metres freestyle
- World record progression 4 × 100 metres freestyle relay
- World record progression 4 × 100 metres medley relay
- World record progression 4 × 200 metres freestyle relay

== Sources ==
- Evans, Hilary; Gjerde, Arild; Heijmans, Jeroen; Mallon, Bill; et al. "Steve Clark". Olympics at Sports-Reference.com. Sports Reference LLC. Archived from the original on April 17, 2020.
