= Swimming at the 1964 Summer Olympics – Men's 4 × 100 metre freestyle relay =

Men's 4 × 100 metre freestyle relay at the Games of the XVIII Olympiad
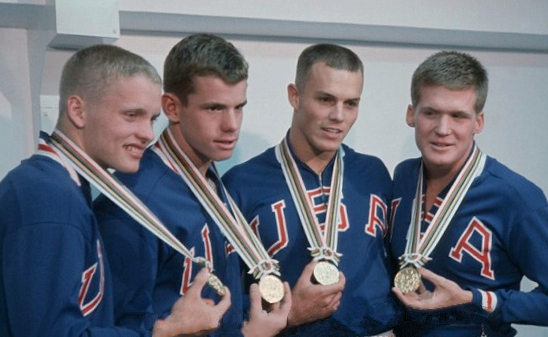
- Gold medalist Don Schollander and finalists Gary Ilman and Mike Austin with relay teammate Steve Clark
- Venue: Yoyogi National Gymnasium
- Dates: 13 October 1964 (heats); 14 October 1964 (final)
- Competitors: 56 from 13 nations
- Teams: 13
- Winning time: 3:33.2 WR

Medalists
1st place, gold medalist(s)		Steve Clark, Mike Austin, Gary Ilman, Don Schollander, Lary Schulhof*	United States
2nd place, silver medalist(s)		Horst Löffler, Frank Wiegand, Uwe Jacobsen, Hans-Joachim Klein	United Team of Germany
3rd place, bronze medalist(s)		David Dickson, Peter Doak, John Ryan, Bob Windle; *Indicates the swimmer only competed in the preliminary heats.	Australia

The men's 4 × 100 metre freestyle relay event at the 1964 Olympic Games took place October 13 — October 14. The relay featured teams of four swimmers each swimming two lengths of the 50 m pool freestyle.

== Results ==
=== Heats ===
Heat 1

Rank	Swimmers	Time	Notes
1	David Dickson, Peter Doak, John Ryan, Bob Windle (AUS)	3:40.6	
2	Alain Gottvallès, Gérard Gropaiz, Robert Christophe, Jean-Pascal Curtillet (FRA)	3:42.1	
3	Yukiaki Okabe, Kunihiro Iwasaki, Katsuki Ishihara, Tadaharu Goto (JPN)	3:42.3	
4	Antal Száll, Ákos Gulyás, László Szlamka, Gyula Dobay (HUN)	3:43.2	
5	Ron Kroon, Vinus van Baalen, Jan Jiskoot, Johan Bontekoe (NED)	3:43.8	
6	Rafael Hernández, Salvador Ruíz, Alfredo Guzmán, Guillermo Echevarría (MEX)	3:58.9	

Heat 2

Rank	Swimmers	Time	Notes
1	Steve Clark, Mike Austin, Lary Schulhof, Gary Ilman (USA)	3:38.8	
2	Horst Löffler, Frank Wiegand, Uwe Jacobsen, Hans-Joachim Klein (GER)	3:41.0	
3	Bengt Nordwall, Ingvar Eriksson, Jan Lundin, Per-Ola Lindberg (SWE)	3:41.3	
4	Vladimir Berezin, Vladimir Shuvalov, Viktor Semchenkov, Yury Sumtsov (URS)	3:41.8	
5	Bob Lord, John Martin-Dye, Peter Kendrew, Bob McGregor (GBR)	3:42.7	
6	Daniel Sherry, Ralph Hutton, Ron Jacks, Sandy Gilchrist (CAN)	3:49.7	
7	Luis Paz, Carlos Canepa, Augusto Ferrero, Walter Ledgard Jr. (PER)	4:02.6	

=== Final ===
Rank	Nation	Swimmers	Time	Notes
1st place, gold medalist(s)	United States	Steve Clark (52.9) = WR; Mike Austin (53.9); Gary Ilman (53.4); Don Schollander (53.0)	3:33.2	WR
2nd place, silver medalist(s)	United Team of Germany	Horst Löffler (55.8); Frank Wiegand (54.2); Uwe Jacobsen (54.8); Hans-Joachim Klein (52.4)	3:37.2	
3rd place, bronze medalist(s)	Australia	David Dickson (54.6); Peter Doak (55.0); John Ryan (55.3); Bob Windle (54.2)	3:39.1	
4	Japan	Kunihiro Iwasaki (55.8); Tadaharu Goto (55.2); Tatsuo Fujimoto (54.9); Yukiaki Okabe (54.6)	3:40.5	
5	Sweden	Bengt Nordwall (56.6); Ingvar Eriksson (54.9); Jan Lundin (54.6); Per-Ola Lindberg (54.6)	3:40.7	
6	Soviet Union	Viktor Mazanov (56.3); Vladimir Shuvalov (55.4); Viktor Semchenkov (55.0); Yury Sumtsov (55.4)	3:42.1	
7	Great Britain	Bob Lord (56.2); John Martin-Dye (56.5); Peter Kendrew (55.8); Bob McGregor (54.1)	3:42.6	
	France	Alain Gottvallès (54.0); Gérard Gropaiz (55.1); Pierre Canavèse (DSQ; ~~55.3~~); Jean-Pascal Curtillet (54.9)		DSQ
