= Swimming at the 1964 Summer Olympics – Men's 100 metre freestyle =

Men's 100 metre freestyle at the Games of the XVIII Olympiad
- Venue: Yoyogi National Gymnasium
- Dates: 11 October 1964 (heats & semifinals); 12 October 1964 (final)
- Competitors: 66 from 33 nations
- Winning time: 53.4 OR

Medalists
1st place, gold medalist(s)		Don Schollander; United States
2nd place, silver medalist(s)		Bobby McGregor; Great Britain
3rd place, bronze medalist(s)		Hans-Joachim Klein; United Team of Germany

The men's 100 metre freestyle event at the 1964 Olympic Games took place between October 11 and 12. There were 66 competitors from 33 nations. Nations were again able to bring up to three swimmers each after a one-Games limit of two in 1960. The event was won by Don Schollander of the United States, the nation's first victory in the event since 1952 and eighth overall (most of any nation). Great Britain (Bobby McGregor's silver) and the United Team of Germany (Hans-Joachim Klein's bronze) both earned their first medal in the men's 100 metre freestyle.

== Background ==
This was the 14th appearance of the men's 100 metre freestyle. The event has been held at every Summer Olympics except 1900 (when the shortest freestyle was the 200 metres), though the 1904 version was measured in yards rather than metres.

Two of the eight finalists from the 1960 Games returned: fifth-place finisher Gyula Dobay of Hungary and eighth-place finisher Per-Ola Lindberg of Sweden. John Devitt of Australia, the winner of a controversial finish in 1960, had retired, as had silver medalist Lance Larson of the United States. The American team in Tokyo was led by Don Schollander, who was expected to vie with Scotsman Bobby McGregor.

Iran, Puerto Rico, South Korea, and Thailand each made their debut in the event. The United States made its 14th appearance, having competed at each edition of the event to date.

== Competition format ==
The competition used a three-round (heats, semifinals, final) format. The advancement rule followed the format introduced in 1952. A swimmer's place in the heat was not used to determine advancement; instead, the fastest times from across all heats in a round were used. There were 9 heats of 7 or 8 swimmers each. The top 24 swimmers advanced to the semifinals. There were 3 semifinals of 8 swimmers each. The top 8 swimmers advanced to the final. Swim-offs were used as necessary to break ties.

This swimming event used freestyle swimming, which means that the method of the stroke is not regulated (unlike backstroke, breaststroke, and butterfly events). Nearly all swimmers use the front crawl or a variant of that stroke. Because an Olympic size swimming pool is 50 metres long, this race consisted of two lengths of the pool.

== Records ==
These were the standing world and Olympic records (in seconds) prior to the 1964 Summer Olympics.

World record	Alain Gottvallès (FRA)	52.9	Budapest, Hungary	13 September 1964
Olympic record	John Devitt (AUS); Lance Larson (USA)	55.2	Rome, Italy	27 August 1960

Gary Ilman dropped more than a second off the Olympic record in the very first heat, recording a time of 54.0 seconds. Seven swimmers beat the old record in the heats, with two more tying it. Ilman shaved off another tenth in the first semifinal, finishing in 53.9 seconds. Ten swimmers beat the old record in that round, with another matching it. The new record fell again in the final, with Don Schollander swimming 53.4 seconds and Bobby McGregor 53.5 seconds.

== Schedule ==
Date	Time	Round
Sunday, 11 October 1964	11:50; 19:45	Heats; Semifinals
Monday, 12 October 1964	20:40	Final

== Results ==
=== Heats ===
Nine heats were held; the fastest 24 swimmers advanced to the semifinals.

Rank	Heat	Swimmer	Nation	Time	Notes
1	1	Gary Ilman	United States	54.0	Q, OR
2	5	Don Schollander	United States	54.3	Q
3	9	Bobby McGregor	Great Britain	54.7	Q
4	2	Mike Austin	United States	54.9	Q
5	2	David Dickson	Australia	55.1	Q
5	3	Per-Ola Lindberg	Sweden	55.1	Q
7	6	Alain Gottvallès	France	55.2	Q
7	6	Daniel Sherry	Canada	55.2	Q
9	4	Hans-Joachim Klein	United Team of Germany	55.3	Q
10	5	Yukiaki Okabe	Japan	55.4	Q
11	8	Ron Kroon	Netherlands	55.5	Q
11	6	John Ryan	Australia	55.5	Q
11	8	Jindřich Vágner	Czechoslovakia	55.5	Q
14	5	Uwe Jacobsen	United Team of Germany	55.6	Q
14	6	Horst Löffler	United Team of Germany	55.6	Q
14	9	Bengt Nordwall	Sweden	55.6	Q
17	8	Bob Lord	Great Britain	55.7	Q
18	3	Pietro Boscaini	Italy	55.8	Q
18	7	Gyula Dobay	Hungary	55.8	Q
18	7	Tatsuo Fujimoto	Japan	55.8	Q
18	7	Sandy Gilchrist	Canada	55.8	Q
18	3	Tadaharu Goto	Japan	55.8	Q
18	1	Gérard Gropaiz	France	55.8	Q
24	6	Vladimir Shuvalov	Soviet Union	55.9	Q
25	1	Athos de Oliveira	Brazil	56.0	
26	3	Luis Nicolao	Argentina	56.1	
26	4	Peter Phelps	Australia	56.1	
28	2	Jean-Pascal Curtillet	France	56.2	
28	4	Lester Eriksson	Sweden	56.2	
28	9	Viktor Semchenkov	Soviet Union	56.2	
31	8	József Gulrich	Hungary	56.3	
31	2	Matti Kasvio	Finland	56.3	
31	4	Yury Sumtsov	Soviet Union	56.3	
34	5	Petr Lohnický	Czechoslovakia	56.4	
35	7	Gert Kölli	Austria	56.5	
36	1	Bruno Bianchi	Italy	56.8	
36	9	Sergio De Gregorio	Italy	56.8	
36	2	Álvaro Pires	Brazil	56.8	
36	4	François Simons	Belgium	56.8	
36	9	Antal Száll	Hungary	56.8	
36	1	Vinus van Baalen	Netherlands	56.8	
36	5	Gerhard Wieland	Austria	56.8	
43	2	Téodoro Capriles	Venezuela	57.2	
44	3	José Miguel Espinosa	Spain	57.4	
45	4	Carlos van der Maath	Argentina	57.5	
46	8	Tuomo Hämäläinen	Finland	57.6	
47	7	David Haller	Great Britain	57.7	
47	1	Ralph Hutton	Canada	57.7	
49	5	Antonio Pérez	Spain	57.8	
50	7	Bert Sitters	Netherlands	58.1	
51	7	Luis Paz	Peru	58.5	
52	6	Georges Welbes	Luxembourg	58.6	
53	2	Tan Thuan Heng	Malaysia	58.7	
53	6	Hannu Vaahtoranta	Finland	58.7	
55	8	Salvador Ruiz	Mexico	58.8	
56	8	Pano Capéronis	Switzerland	58.9	
57	6	Guðmundur Gíslason	Iceland	59.0	
57	3	Herlander Ribeiro	Portugal	59.0	
59	5	Mauri Fonseca	Brazil	59.6	
60	3	Somchai Limpichat	Thailand	59.8	
61	7	Robert Loh	Hong Kong	1:00.4	
62	4	Nguyễn Ðình Lê	Vietnam	1:01.1	
62	9	Phan Hữu Dong	Vietnam	1:01.1	
64	1	Kim Bong-jo	South Korea	1:01.2	
65	9	Celestino Pérez	Puerto Rico	1:01.3	
66	9	Haydar Shonjani	Iran	1:02.1	

=== Semifinals ===
Three heats were held; the fastest eight swimmers advanced to the final.

Rank	Heat	Swimmer	Nation	Time	Notes
1	1	Gary Ilman	United States	53.9	Q, OR
2	2	Don Schollander	United States	54.0	Q
3	1	Mike Austin	United States	54.3	Q
3	2	Alain Gottvallès	France	54.3	Q
3	3	Bobby McGregor	Great Britain	54.3	Q
6	3	Hans-Joachim Klein	United Team of Germany	54.4	Q
7	3	Gyula Dobay	Hungary	54.8	Q
7	2	Uwe Jacobsen	United Team of Germany	54.8	Q
9	3	David Dickson	Australia	54.9	
10	2	Per-Ola Lindberg	Sweden	55.1	
11	1	Yukiaki Okabe	Japan	55.2	
12	1	Daniel Sherry	Canada	55.5	
12	2	Jindřich Vágner	Czechoslovakia	55.5	
14	1	Tadaharu Goto	Japan	55.6	
15	2	Gérard Gropaiz	France	55.7	
15	1	Ron Kroon	Netherlands	55.7	
17	3	Tatsuo Fujimoto	Japan	55.8	
17	3	Vladimir Shuvalov	Soviet Union	55.8	
19	1	Horst Löffler	United Team of Germany	56.0	
20	1	Pietro Boscaini	Italy	56.1	
21	2	Sandy Gilchrist	Canada	56.4	
21	3	Bengt Nordwall	Sweden	56.4	
23	2	Bob Lord	Great Britain	56.5	
23	3	John Ryan	Australia	56.5	

=== Final ===
The officials used unofficial electronic scoring to determine which swimmer won the bronze medal - Klein had finished one one-thousandth of a second sooner than Ilman.

Rank	Swimmer	Nation	Time	Notes
1st place, gold medalist(s)	Don Schollander	United States	53.4	OR
2nd place, silver medalist(s)	Bobby McGregor	Great Britain	53.5	
3rd place, bronze medalist(s)	Hans-Joachim Klein	United Team of Germany	54.0	
4	Gary Ilman	United States	54.0	
5	Alain Gottvallès	France	54.2	
6	Mike Austin	United States	54.5	
7	Gyula Dobay	Hungary	54.9	
8	Uwe Jacobsen	United Team of Germany	56.1	
