= Swimming at the 1960 Summer Olympics – Men's 100 metre freestyle =

Men's 100 metre freestyle at the Games of the XVII Olympiad
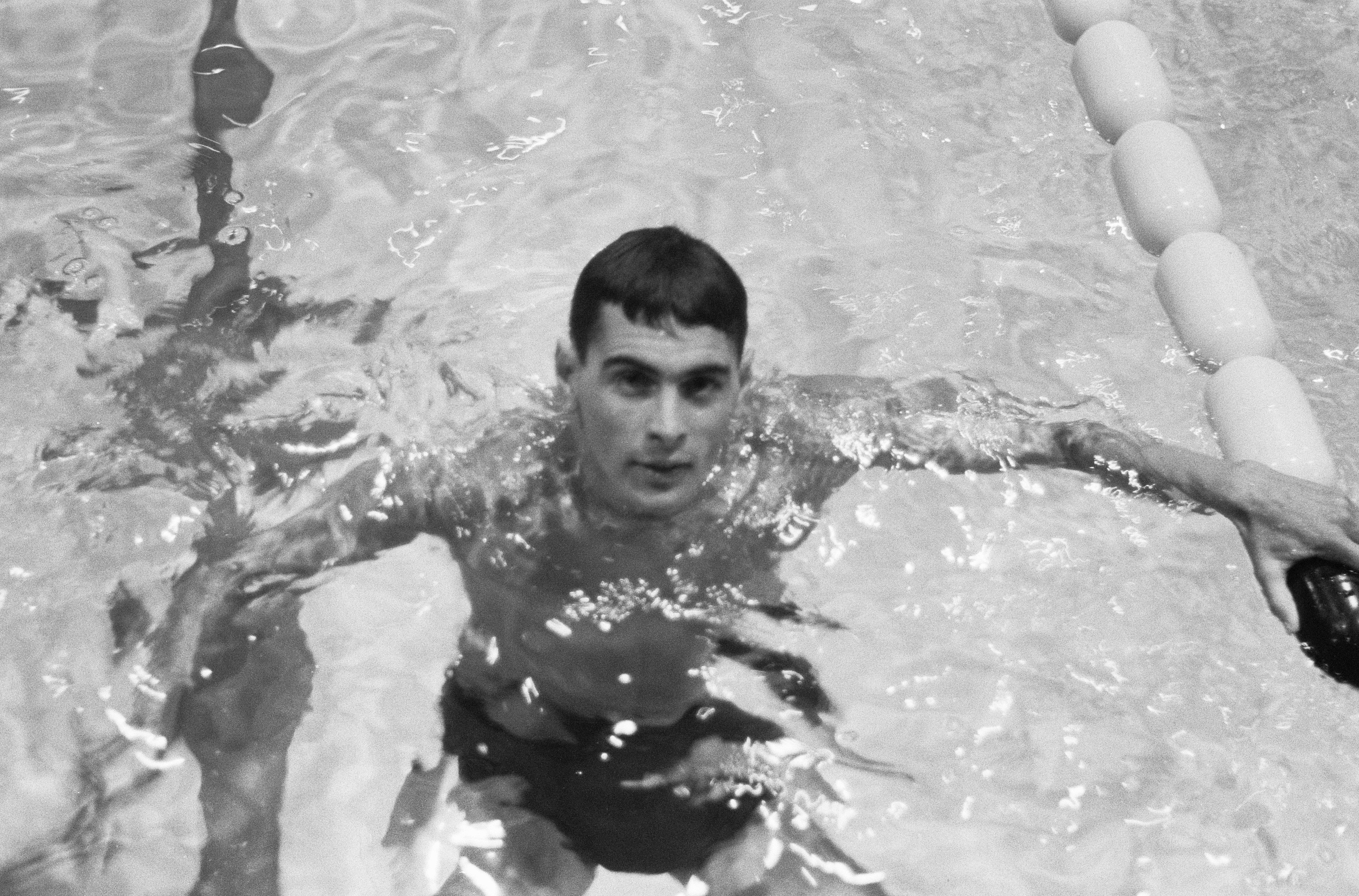
- John Devitt
- Venue: Stadio Olimpico del Nuoto
- Dates: August 26, 1960 (heats & semifinals); August 27, 1960 (final)
- Competitors: 51 from 34 nations
- Winning time: 55.2 OR

Medalists
1st place, gold medalist(s)		John Devitt; Australia
2nd place, silver medalist(s)		Lance Larson; United States
3rd place, bronze medalist(s)		Manuel dos Santos; Brazil

The men's 100 metre freestyle event at the 1960 Olympic Games took place between August 26 and 27. There were 51 competitors from 34 nations. Nations were limited to two swimmers each, down from three in previous Games. The event was won by John Devitt of Australia over Lance Larson of the United States in a controversial, disputed finish that resulted in a push for electronic timing. It was Australia's second consecutive victory in the event, third-most all-time behind the United States' 7 gold medals and Hungary's 3. Devitt, silver medalist four years earlier, was the fifth man to win multiple medals in the event. Manuel dos Santos earned Brazil's first medal in the men's 100 metre freestyle with his bronze.

== Controversy ==
Results were decided by finish judges who relied on their eyes and did not use replays. Three judges were assigned to each finishing position. There were three official timers in 1960 for each lane and swimmer, all timing by hand. All three timers for Devitt, in lane three, timed him in 55.2 seconds. The three timers for lane four timed Lance Larson in 55.0, 55.1, and 55.1 seconds.

Former Olympic swimmer and FINA co-founder Max Ritter inspected the judge's scorecards. Two of the three first-place judges found that Devitt had finished first and the third found for Larson. Of the three-second-place judges, two found that Devitt finished second and one found that Larson was second. Ritter pointed out to chief judge Henry Runströmer of Sweden that the scorecards indicated a tie. Runstrümer cast the deciding vote and declared Devitt the winner. However, the rules at that time did not provide for the chief judge to have a vote or give him the right to break ties. Ties were supposed to be broken by referring to the timing machine. The official results placed Devitt first and Larson second, both with the identical time of 55.2 seconds. The United States team appealed, bolstered by videotaped footage of the finish that appeared to show Larson the winner. The appeal jury, headed by Jan de Vries, also the President of FINA in 1960, rejected the appeal, keeping Devitt the winner. This controversy would pave the way for electronic touchpads to be included in swimming events to determine finish and accurate timing.

== Background ==
This was the 13th appearance of the men's 100 metre freestyle. The event has been held at every Summer Olympics except 1900 (when the shortest freestyle was the 200 metres), though the 1904 version was measured in yards rather than metres.

Two of the eight finalists from the 1956 Games returned: gold medalist Jon Henricks and silver medalist John Devitt, both of Australia. The reduction in the limit of swimmers per nation from three to two made an Australian sweep repeat impossible.

Jeff Farrell was the favorite coming into the year, but an emergency appendectomy a week before the U.S. trials resulted in him finishing fourth and not making the team for the individual event (though he did get a place on the relay team). The two Australian veterans would have been strong competition for him, with Devitt (the world record holder) having a slight edge over Henricks since the last Olympics; however, with Farrell out and Henricks falling ill in Rome (still competing but clearly not at full strength), Devitt became the strong favorite. American swimmers were always dangerous, with Lance Larson and Bruce Hunter the United States pair this Games.

Malaya (later Malaysia), Malta, and Turkey each made their debut in the event. The United States made its 13th appearance, having competed at each edition of the event to date.

== Competition format ==
The competition used a three-round (heats, semifinals, final) format. The advancement rule followed the format introduced in 1952. A swimmer's place in the heat was not used to determine advancement; instead, the fastest times from across all heats in a round were used. There were 7 heats of between 6 and 8 swimmers each. The top 24 swimmers advanced to the semifinals. There were 3 semifinals of 8 swimmers each. The top 8 swimmers advanced to the final. Swim-offs were used as necessary to break ties.

This swimming event used freestyle swimming, which means that the method of the stroke is not regulated (unlike backstroke, breaststroke, and butterfly events). Nearly all swimmers use the front crawl or a variant of that stroke. Because an Olympic size swimming pool is 50 metres long, this race consisted of two lengths of the pool.

== Records ==
These were the standing world and Olympic records (in seconds) prior to the 1960 Summer Olympics.

World record	John Devitt (AUS)	54.6	Brisbane, Australia	28 January 1957
Olympic record	Jon Henricks (AUS)	55.4	Melbourne, Australia	30 November 1956

John Devitt and Lance Larson both had official times of 55.2 in the final, breaking the Olympic record.

== Schedule ==
Date	Time	Round
Friday, 26 August 1960	8:30; 20:30	Heats; Semifinals
Saturday, 27 August 1960	21:05	Final

== Results ==
=== Heats ===
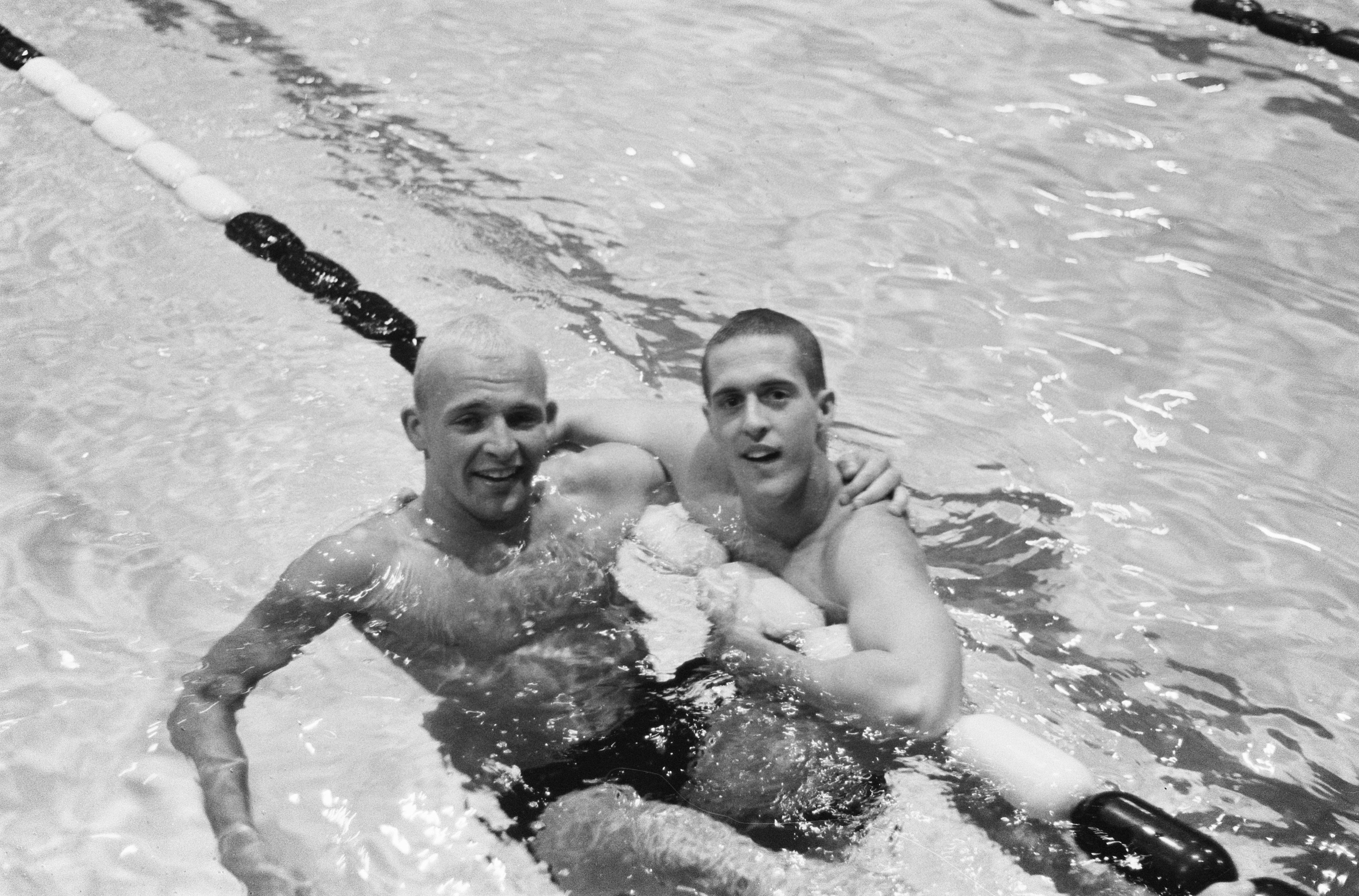
Lance Larson and Bruce Hunter

Seven heats were held; the swimmers with the fastest 24 times advanced to the semifinals. This round took place on August 26.

Rank	Heat	Swimmer	Nation	Time	Notes
1	7	Lance Larson	United States	55.7	Q
2	2	John Devitt	Australia	56.0	Q
3	7	Aubrey Bürer	South Africa	56.3	Q
3	3	Manuel dos Santos	Brazil	56.3	Q
3	2	Alain Gottvallès	France	56.3	Q
6	4	Gyula Dobay	Hungary	56.5	Q
6	3	Andrzej Salamon	Poland	56.5	Q
8	6	Bruce Hunter	United States	56.6	Q
9	6	Dick Pound	Canada	56.7	Q
10	1	Karri Käyhkö	Finland	56.8	Q
11	5	Jon Henricks	Australia	56.9	Q
12	5	Per-Ola Lindberg	Sweden	57.1	Q
13	1	Keigo Shimizu	Japan	57.3	Q
14	5	László Lantos	Hungary	57.4	Q
15	7	Katsuki Ishihara	Japan	57.5	Q
16	3	Jorge Escalante	Mexico	57.6	Q
16	3	Cam Grout	Canada	57.6	Q
18	3	Ron Kroon	Netherlands	57.7	Q
19	7	Bernard Aluchna	Poland	57.9	Q
19	2	Uwe Jacobsen	United Team of Germany	57.9	Q
19	2	Igor Luzhkovsky	Soviet Union	57.9	Q
22	7	Paul Voell	United Team of Germany	58.0	Q
23	1	Ezio Della Savia	Italy	58.2	Q
23	4	Vitaly Sorokin	Soviet Union	58.2	Q
25	1	Gert Kölli	Austria	58.3	
25	6	Rubén Roca	Cuba	58.3	
27	4	Bengt Nordwall	Sweden	58.5	
28	6	Janez Kocmur	Yugoslavia	58.7	
29	4	Jan Bouwman	Netherlands	58.8	
30	6	Giorgio Perondini	Italy	58.9	
31	5	Stanley Clarke	Great Britain	59.1	
31	2	Achmad Dimyati	Indonesia	59.1	
33	7	William O'Donnell	Great Britain	59.2	
34	3	Gérard Gropaiz	France	59.3	
35	4	Amiram Trauber	Israel	59.7	
36	5	Fernando de Abreu	Brazil	1:00.1	
37	2	Luis Nicolao	Argentina	1:00.2	
37	1	Herlander Ribeiro	Portugal	1:00.2	
39	7	Gojko Arneri	Yugoslavia	1:00.5	
40	1	Leopoldo Rodés	Spain	1:00.7	
41	5	Guðmundur Gíslason	Iceland	1:00.8	
42	7	Itzhak Luria	Israel	1:00.9	
43	4	Cheung Kin Man	Hong Kong	1:01.1	
44	6	Phan Hữu Dong	Vietnam	1:01.3	
45	3	Peter Bärtschi	Switzerland	1:02.9	
46	5	Freddie Elizalde	Philippines	1:03.0	
46	6	Ünsal Fikirci	Turkey	1:03.0	
48	2	Fong Seow Jit	Malaya	1:03.4	
49	1	René Wagner	Luxembourg	1:04.3	
50	2	Alfred Grixti	Malta	1:07.8	
51	5	Christopher Dowling	Malta	1:08.9	

=== Semifinals ===
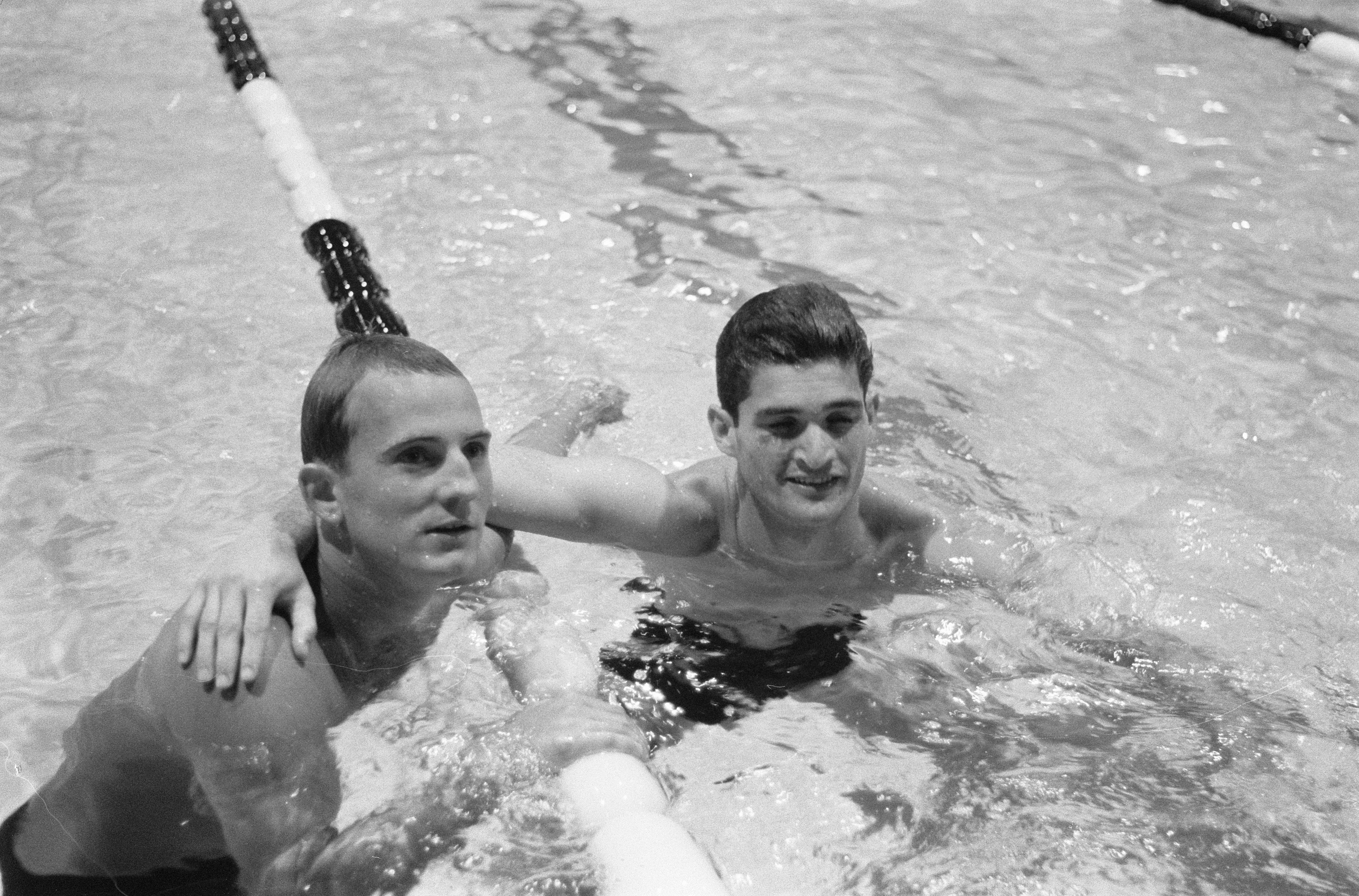
Manuel dos Santos and Gyula Dobay

Three semifinal races were held; the fastest eight swimmers advanced to the final. The semifinals were held on August 26.

Rank	Heat	Swimmer	Nation	Time	Notes
1	1	Lance Larson	United States	55.5	Q
2	1	Bruce Hunter	United States	55.7	Q
3	2	John Devitt	Australia	55.8	Q
4	3	Gyula Dobay	Hungary	56.3	Q
4	3	Manuel dos Santos	Brazil	56.3	Q
6	3	Per-Ola Lindberg	Sweden	56.4	Q
7	1	Aubrey Bürer	South Africa	56.5	Q
7	2	Dick Pound	Canada	56.5	Q
9	3	Karri Käyhkö	Finland	56.6	
10	2	Andrzej Salamon	Poland	56.9	
11	1	Keigo Shimizu	Japan	57.1	
12	2	Jon Henricks	Australia	57.2	
13	2	Uwe Jacobsen	United Team of Germany	57.4	
14	1	Igor Luzhkovsky	Soviet Union	57.5	
15	3	Bernard Aluchna	Poland	57.8	
15	3	Katsuki Ishihara	Japan	57.8	
17	3	Ron Kroon	Netherlands	57.9	
18	1	Cam Grout	Canada	58.0	
18	2	László Lantos	Hungary	58.0	
20	3	Ezio Della Savia	Italy	58.4	
20	1	Paul Voell	United Team of Germany	58.4	
22	1	Alain Gottvallès	France	58.5	
23	2	Vitaly Sorokin	Soviet Union	58.7	
24	2	Jorge Escalante	Mexico	59.0	

=== Final ===
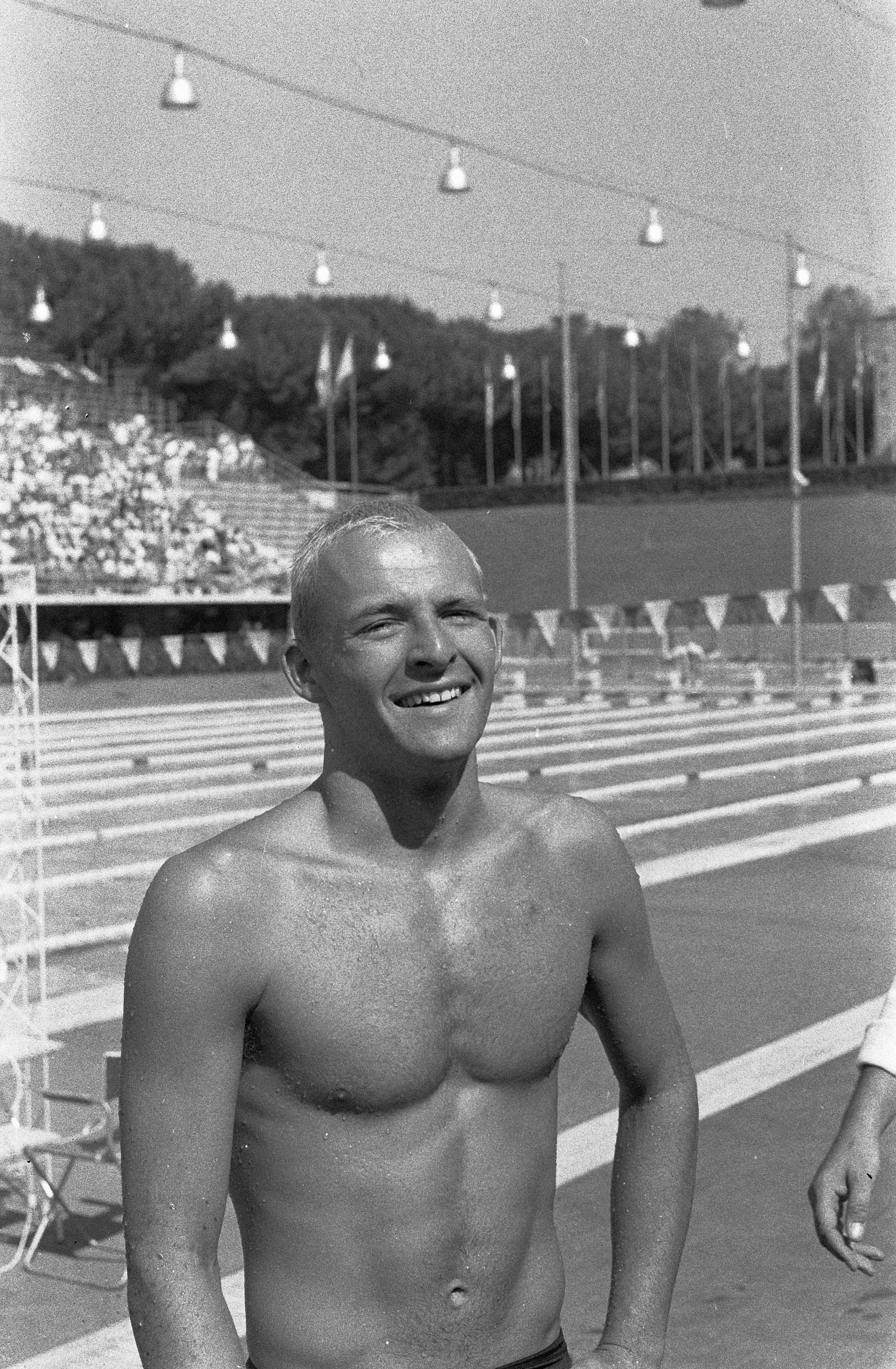
Lance Larson

The final was held on August 27.

Rank	Swimmer	Nation	Time	Notes
1st place, gold medalist(s)	John Devitt	Australia	55.2	OR
2nd place, silver medalist(s)	Lance Larson	United States	55.2	OR
3rd place, bronze medalist(s)	Manuel dos Santos	Brazil	55.4	
4	Bruce Hunter	United States	55.6	
5	Gyula Dobay	Hungary	56.3	
6	Dick Pound	Canada	56.3	
7	Aubrey Bürer	South Africa	56.3	
8	Per-Ola Lindberg	Sweden	57.1	
