= Peru at the 1964 Summer Olympics =

- IOC code: PER
- NOC: Peruvian Olympic Committee

in Tokyo
- Competitors: 31 (30 men, 1 woman) in 5 sports
- Medals: Gold 0 Silver 0 Bronze 0 Total 0

Summer Olympics appearances (overview)
- 1900; 1904–1932; 1936; 1948; 1952; 1956; 1960; 1964; 1968; 1972; 1976; 1980; 1984; 1988; 1992; 1996; 2000; 2004; 2008; 2012; 2016; 2020; 2024; 2028

Peru competed at the 1964 Summer Olympics in Tokyo, Japan. 31 competitors, 30 men and 1 woman, took part in 19 events in 5 sports. 15 year-old, Rosario de Vivanco was the first female athlete to represent Peru at the Olympic Games.

== Athletics ==
Track events

Athletes	Events	Heat		Quarterfinal		Semifinal		Final	Rank
Athletes	Events	Result	Rank	Result	Rank	Result	Rank	Result	Rank
Gerardo di Tolla	Men's 100 metres	10.9	7	did not advance					
Gerardo di Tolla	Men's 200 metres	22.1	7	did not advance					
José Cavero	400 metres Hurdles	53.7	6	did not advance		—N/a		did not advance	

Field events

Athlete	Event	Qualification		Final	
Athlete	Event	Result	Rank	Result	Rank
Roberto Abugattás	High jump	1.95	26	did not advance	

== Basketball ==
Peru won two of its games to finish seventh in its group. It lost to Canada by one point in the knock-out stage but won its final matches against Korea to claim the 14th place.

=== Group B ===
Qualified for the semifinals

Team	W	L	PF	PA	PD	Pts	Tie
United States	7	0	569	333	+236	14	
Brazil	5	2	473	452	+21	12	1W−0L
SFR Yugoslavia	5	2	529	453	+76	12	0W−1L
Uruguay	4	3	472	482	−10	11	
Finland	3	4	409	475	−66	10	
Australia	2	5	434	460	−26	9	1W−0L
Peru	2	5	431	453	−22	9	0W−1L
South Korea	0	7	432	641	−209	7	

11 October
10:30

Brazil	50–58	Peru

Yoyogi National Gymnasium, Tokyo

12 October
17:30

Australia	81–62	Peru

Yoyogi National Gymnasium, Tokyo

13 October
9:00

United States	60–45	Peru

Yoyogi National Gymnasium, Tokyo

14 October
13:30

Peru	64–73	SFR Yugoslavia

Yoyogi National Gymnasium, Tokyo

16 October
10:30

Peru	84–57	South Korea

Yoyogi National Gymnasium, Tokyo

17 October
17:30

Peru	59–63	Finland

Yoyogi National Gymnasium, Tokyo

18 October
20:30

Uruguay	69–59	Peru

Yoyogi National Gymnasium, Tokyo

=== Knockout stage ===
13th-16th

20 October
20:30

Canada	82–81	Peru

Yoyogi National Gymnasium, Tokyo

22 October
17:30

Peru	71–66	South Korea

Yoyogi National Gymnasium, Tokyo

=== Squad ===
- Carlos Vásquez
- Enrique Duarte
- Jorge Vargas
- José Guzmán
- Luis Duarte
- Manuel Valerio
- Oscar Benalcázar
- Oscar Sevilla
- Raúl Duarte
- Ricardo Duarte
- Simon Peredes
- Tomás Sangio

== Cycling ==
=== Road ===
Rider	Event	Time	Rank
Teófilo Toda	Road race	DNF	

== Shooting ==
Nine shooters represented Peru in 1964.

Pistol

Athlete	Event	Final	
Athlete	Event	Score	Rank
Guillermo Cornejo	25 metre rapid fire pistol	573	34
Armando López-Torres	25 metre rapid fire pistol	553	43
Antonio Vita	50 metre	550	6
Pedro Puente	50 metre	494	50

Rifle

Athlete	Event	Final	
Athlete	Event	Score	Rank
Oscar Caceres	50 m rifle 3 positions	1114	30
Carlos Lastarria	50 m rifle 3 positions	1086	59
Oscar Caceres	50 m rifle prone	584	49
Javier Caceres	50 m rifle prone	572	68
Enrique Dibos	Trap	178	37
Eduard de Atzel	Trap	182	34

== Swimming ==
Men

Athlete	Event	Heat		Semifinal		Final	
Athlete	Event	Time	Rank	Time	Rank	Time	Rank
Luis Paz	100 m freestyle	58.5	7	did not advance			
Carlos Canepa	400 m freestyle	4:44.9	5	did not advance			
Walter Ledgard Jr.	400 m freestyle	4:50.4	7	did not advance			
Walter Ledgard Jr.	1500 m freestyle	19:10.3	7	did not advance			
Luis Paz; Carlos Canepa; Augusto Ferrero; Walter Ledgard Jr.	4 × 100 m freestyle relay	4:02.6	7	—N/a		did not advance	
Augusto Ferrero	200 m backstroke	2:29.9	7	did not advance			
Carlos Canepa	200 m butterfly	2:24.9	6	did not advance			
Gustavo Ocampo	200 m butterfly	2:31.4	6	did not advance			
Luis Paz	400 m individual medley	5:39.5	8	did not advance			

Women

Athlete	Event	Heat		Semifinal		Final	
Athlete	Event	Time	Rank	Time	Rank	Time	Rank
Rosario de Vivanco	100 m freestyle	1:09.0	8	did not advance			
