= William O'Donnell =

William O'Donnell may refer to:

- William O'Donnell (cricketer) (born 1997), New Zealand cricketer
- William O'Donnell (Irish politician) (died 1947), Irish politician in the Dáil Éireann
- William O'Donnell (Wisconsin politician) (1922–2002), American politician from Wisconsin
- Bill O'Donnell (harness race driver) (born 1948), Canadian harness racer
- Bill O'Donnell (sportscaster) (1926–1982), American sportscaster
- William O'Donnell (swimmer) (born 1942), British swimmer
- Willie O'Donnell, hurler, see List of Interprovincial Hurling Championship finals
