= René Wagner (disambiguation) =

René Wagner (born 1972) is a Czech football player and manager.

René Wagner may also refer to:

- René Wagner (football coach) (born 1988), German football coach
- René Wagner (swimmer) (born 1938), Luxembourg swimmer
