= Nordwall =

Nordwall is a surname. Notable people with the surname include:

- Bengt Nordwall (born 1941), Swedish swimmer
- Lars Nordwall (1928–2004), Swedish cyclist
- Yngve Nordwall (1908–1994), Swedish film actor and director
