= Gary Ilman =

American swimmer (1943–2014)

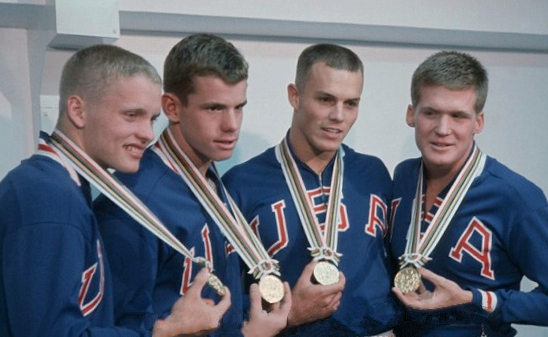
- Schollander, Ilman, Austin and Clark display gold medals at 1964 Olympics

Personal information
- Full name: Gary Steven Ilman
- National team: United States
- Born: August 13, 1943 Glendale, California, U.S.
- Died: August 16, 2014 (aged 71)
- Height: 6 ft 2 in (1.88 m)
- Weight: 196 lb (89 kg)

Sport
- Sport: Swimming
- Strokes: Freestyle
- Club: Santa Clara Swim Club
- College team: Foothill Junior College; California State University, Long Beach
Medal record
Men's swimming
Representing the United States
Olympic Games
Gold medal – first place	1964 Tokyo	4×100 m freestyle
Gold medal – first place	1964 Tokyo	4×200 m freestyle
Pan American Games
Gold medal – first place	1963 São Paulo	4×200 m freestyle
Summer Universiade
Gold medal – first place	1965 Budapest	4×100 m freestyle
Gold medal – first place	1965 Budapest	4×200 m freestyle
Bronze medal – third place	1965 Budapest	100 m freestyle

Gary Steven Ilman (August 13, 1943 – August 16, 2014) was an American competition swimmer, two-time Olympic gold medalist, and former world record-holder in two relay events. He would later coach swimming, serving as a Head Coach at Colorado State, and work in the electronics industry.

== College swimming ==
Ilman attended and swam for Long Beach State, but earlier swam for Hall of Fame Coach Nort Thornton Jr. at Foothill Junior College in Los Altos, California. At Long Beach State, where he competed for two years after Foothill Junior College, he helped bring the team to Top 5 finishes at the Division II NCAA national swimming championships, with a second place finish in 1965 and a fourth place finish in 1966. During his tenure at Long Beach, he won three individual championships in 1965, including the 100m freestyle, the 200m freestyle, and the 100m butterfly. In 1966, he showed consistency and dominance in the stroke and repeated as the champion of the 100m butterfly champion, while won a fourth individual event requiring diverse stroke mastery, the 200m individual medley.

During his college years, Ilman made his international swimming debut as a member of the U.S. national swimming team at the 1963 Pan American Games in São Paulo, Brazil. He was a member of the U.S. squad that won the gold medal in the men's 4×200-metre freestyle relay, together with his American teammates Richard McDonough, David Lyons and Ed Townsend.

== 1964 Olympics ==
Ilman represented the United States at the 1964 Summer Olympics in Tokyo, Japan, where he won gold medals as a member of the first-place U.S. teams in the men's 4×100-meter freestyle relay and men's 4×200-meter freestyle relay. In both freestyle relay events, Ilman and his American teammates broke existing world records. Steve Clark, Mike Austin, Ilman and Don Schollander set a new world record of 3:33.2 in the 4×100; then Clark, Roy Saari, Ilman and Schollander set a new world mark of 7:52.1 in the 4×200.

In individual competition, he finished fourth in the 100-metre freestyle event final. In a controversial outcome, both Ilman and German swimmer Hans-Joachim Klein were officially timed at 54.0 seconds (to 1/10 of a second), and were still tied at 54.00 (to 1/100 of a second) using the new unofficial electronic timing, but the judges on their own initiative awarded the bronze medal solely to Klein on the basis of the unofficial electronic time taken to 1/1,000 of a second.

== 1965 Universiade ==
Ilman finished his international swimming career at the 1965 World University Games in Budapest, Hungary, where he won a pair of gold medals as a member of the winning U.S. relay teams in the 4×100-metre and 4×200-metre freestyle relay events, and a bronze medal in the 100-metre freestyle.

He later served as a coach, with the Montréal Athletic Club, and as an assistant coach at the University of Alabama. He served as head coach at Colorado State. In 1981, looking for a different professional challenge, he left coaching to enter the electronics industry.

== Death ==
Ilman died on August 16, 2014, at the age of 71.

== See also ==
- List of California State University, Long Beach people
- List of Olympic medalists in swimming (men)
- World record progression 4 × 100 metres freestyle relay
- World record progression 4 × 200 metres freestyle relay
