= Nguyễn Ðình Lê =

Vietnamese swimmer

Personal information
- Born: 9 May 1949 (age 77)

Sport
- Sport: Swimming

Nguyễn Ðình Lê (born 9 May 1949) is a Vietnamese former swimmer. He competed in the men's 100 metre freestyle at the 1964 Summer Olympics.
