= Rob van Empel =

Dutch swimmer (born 1941)

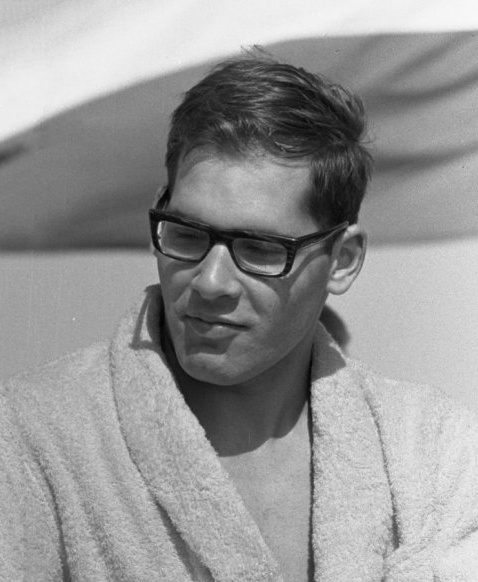
- Rob van Empel in 1962

Personal information
- Born: 17 July 1941 (age 84) Heilig Landstichting, Netherlands

Sport
- Sport: Swimming
- Club: ESCA, EZ&PC
Medal record
Representing the Netherlands
European Championships
Bronze medal – third place	1962 Leipzig	200 m breaststroke

Rob van Empel (born 17 July 1941) is a retired Dutch breaststroke swimmer. His career was overshadowed by Wieger Mensonides, who dominated the Dutch breaststroke through the 1960s. However, at the national championships in 1962, they both finished in a national record time. Thus van Empel qualified for the 1962 European Aquatics Championships where he won a bronze medal.
