= Ria van Velsen =

Dutch swimmer (1943–2025)

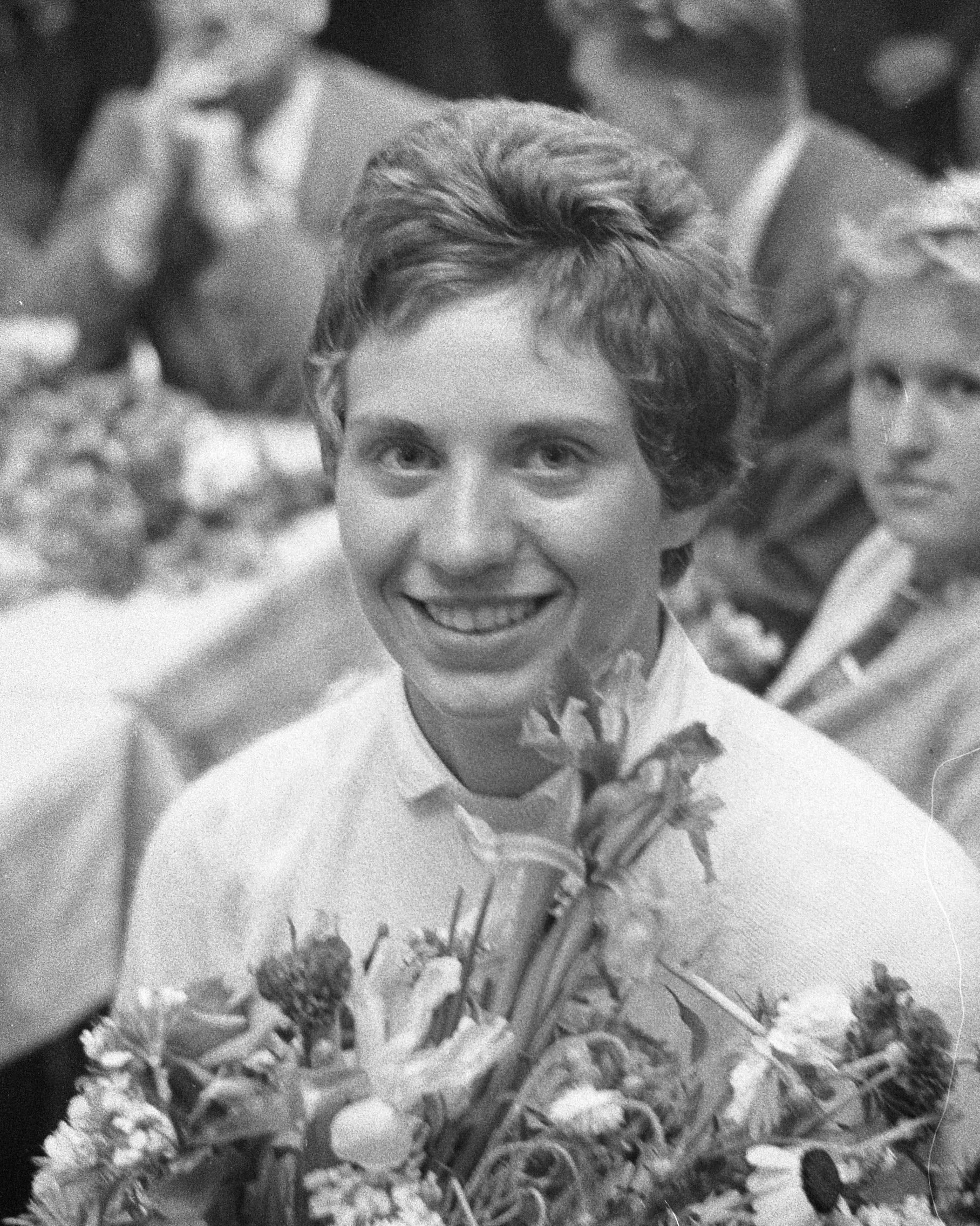
- Van Velsen in 1960

Medal record

Women's swimming

Representing the Netherlands

European Championships
Gold medal – first place	1962 Leipzig	100 m backstroke
Silver medal – second place	1962 Leipzig	4×100 m medley

Maria Martina "Ria" van Velsen (22 March 1943 – 25 October 2025) was a Dutch backstroke swimmer who participated in the 1960 and 1964 Summer Olympics. In 1960, she was seventh individually in the 100m backstroke event. She was also part of the Dutch medley team that broke the 4 × 100 m medley Olympic record in the preliminaries; however, they finished fourth in the final. She also won two medals at the 1962 European Aquatics Championships, and set four world records: three in 100m backstroke (1958, 1959, 1960) and one in the 4 × 100 m medley relay (1964). Van Velsen died on 25 October 2025, at the age of 82.

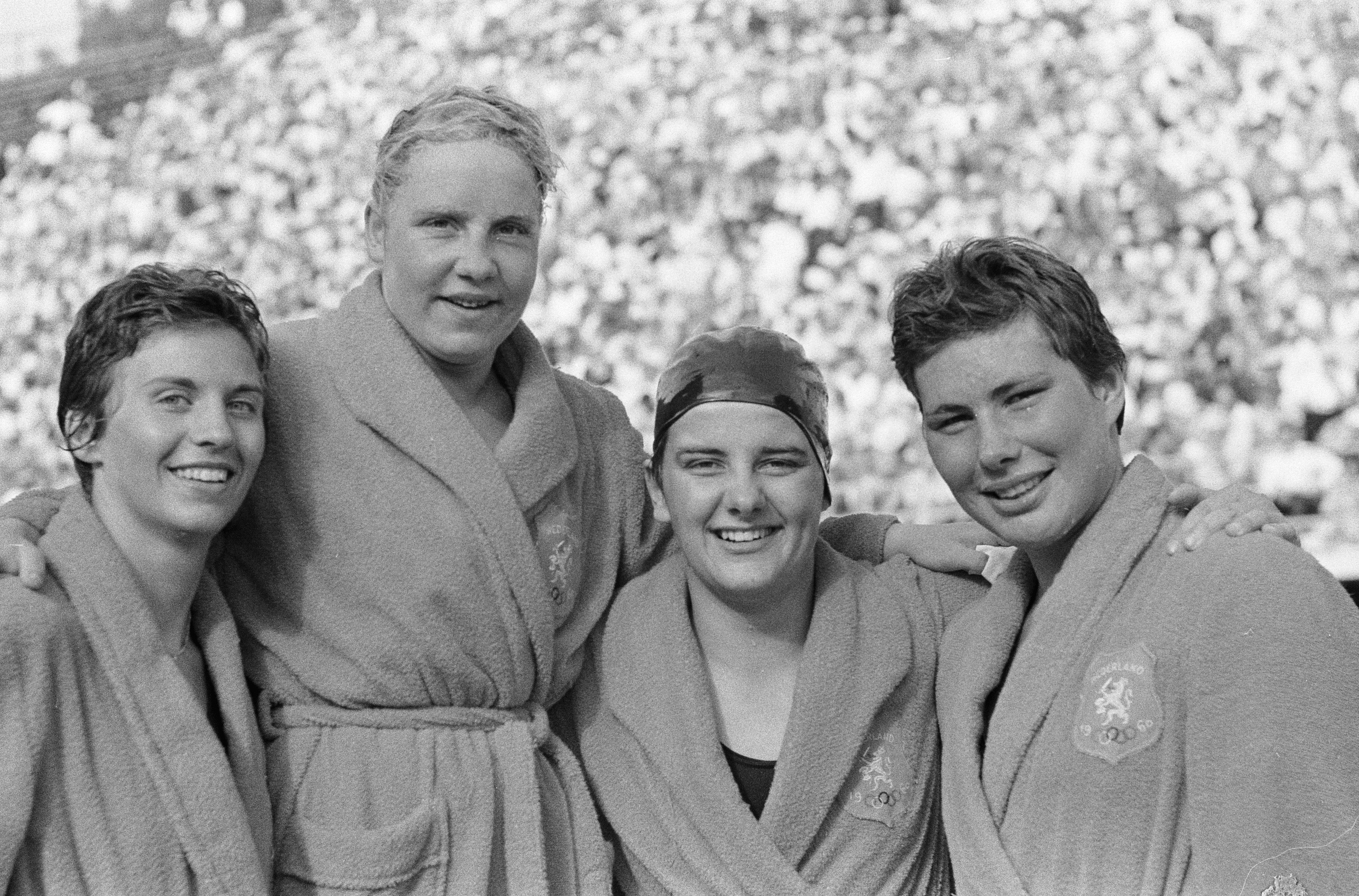
The Dutch medley team that broke the 4 × 100 m medley Olympic record in 1960: Ria van Velsen, Tineke Lagerberg, Erica Terpstra and Ada den Haan.
