= Ute Noack (swimmer) =

German swimmer

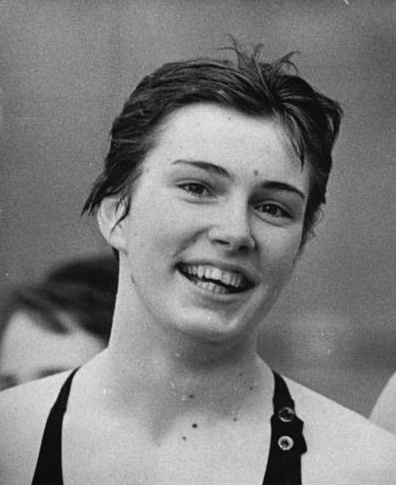
- Ute Noack in 1962

Personal information
- Born: 17 January 1943 (age 83) Berlin, Germany
- Height: 1.72 m (5 ft 8 in)
- Weight: 68 kg (150 lb)

Sport
- Sport: Swimming
Medal record
Women's swimming
Representing East Germany
European Championships
Gold medal – first place	1962 Leipzig	4×100 m medley
Silver medal – second place	1962 Leipzig	100 m butterfly

Ute Noack (born 17 January 1943) is a retired German butterfly swimmer who won a gold medal in the 4 × 100 m medley relay at the 1962 European Aquatics Championships, setting a new world record. For this achievement, the relay team members were named German Sportspersonalities of the Year in the team category in 1962. Noack also won the silver medal in the 100 m butterfly at the same championships. She competed at the 1964 Summer Olympics in the 100 m butterfly, but was eliminated in the preliminaries.
