= Adrie Lasterie =

Dutch swimmer (1943–1991)

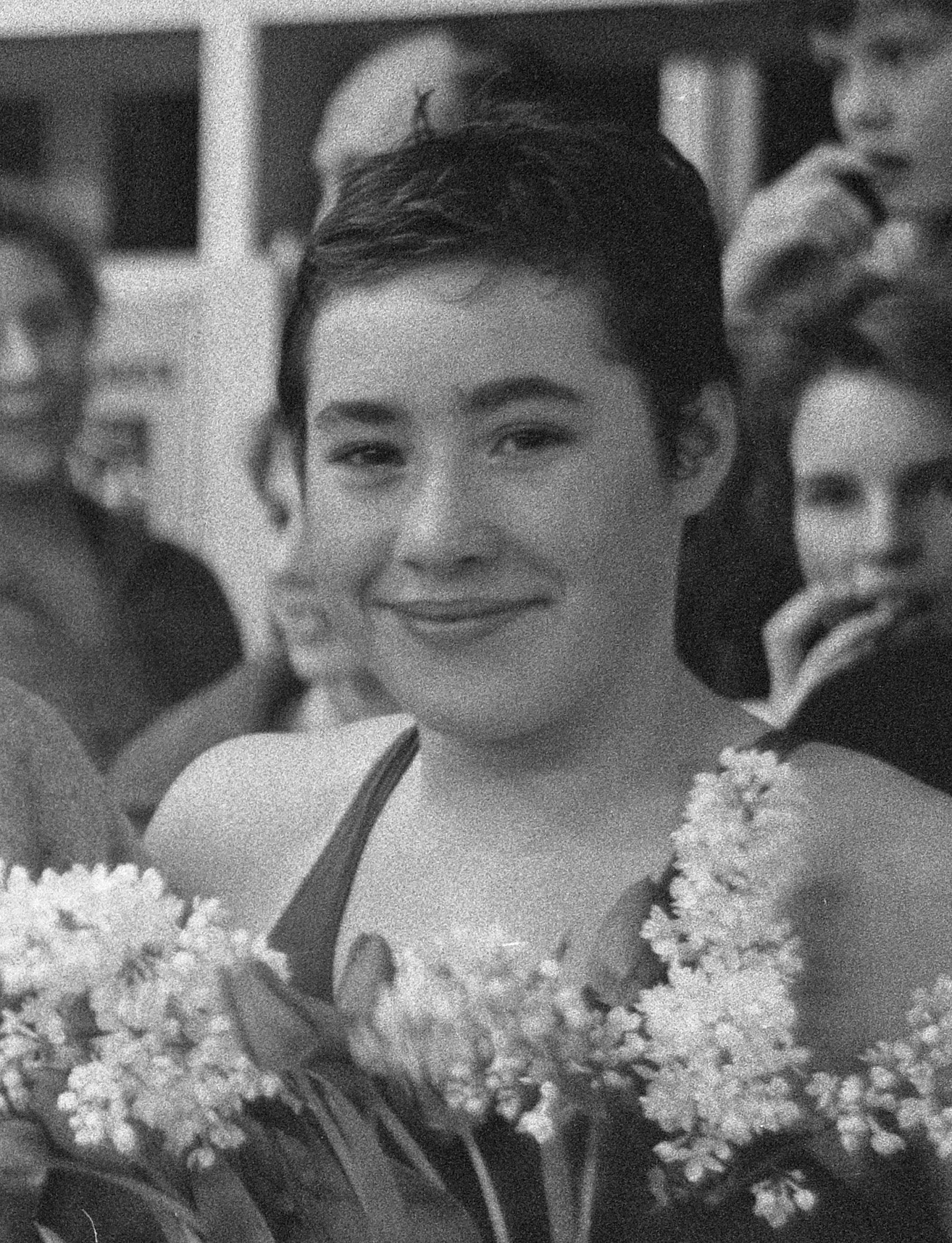
- Lasterie in 1961

Personal information
- Born: 16 December 1943 Hilversum, the Netherlands
- Died: 22 March 1991 (aged 47) Naarden, the Netherlands
- Height: 1.71 m (5 ft 7 in)
- Weight: 65 kg (143 lb)

Sport
- Sport: Swimming
- Club: ZV Naarden
Medal record
Women's swimming
Representing Netherlands
Olympic Games
| Silver medal – second place | 1964 Tokyo | 4×100 m medley |
European Championships
| Gold medal – first place | 1962 Leipzig | 4×100 m freestyle |
| Gold medal – first place | 1962 Leipzig | 400 m freestyle |
| Gold medal – first place | 1962 Leipzig | 400 m medley |

Aartje Elisabeth "Adrie" Lasterie (16 December 1943 – 22 March 1991) was a Dutch swimmer.

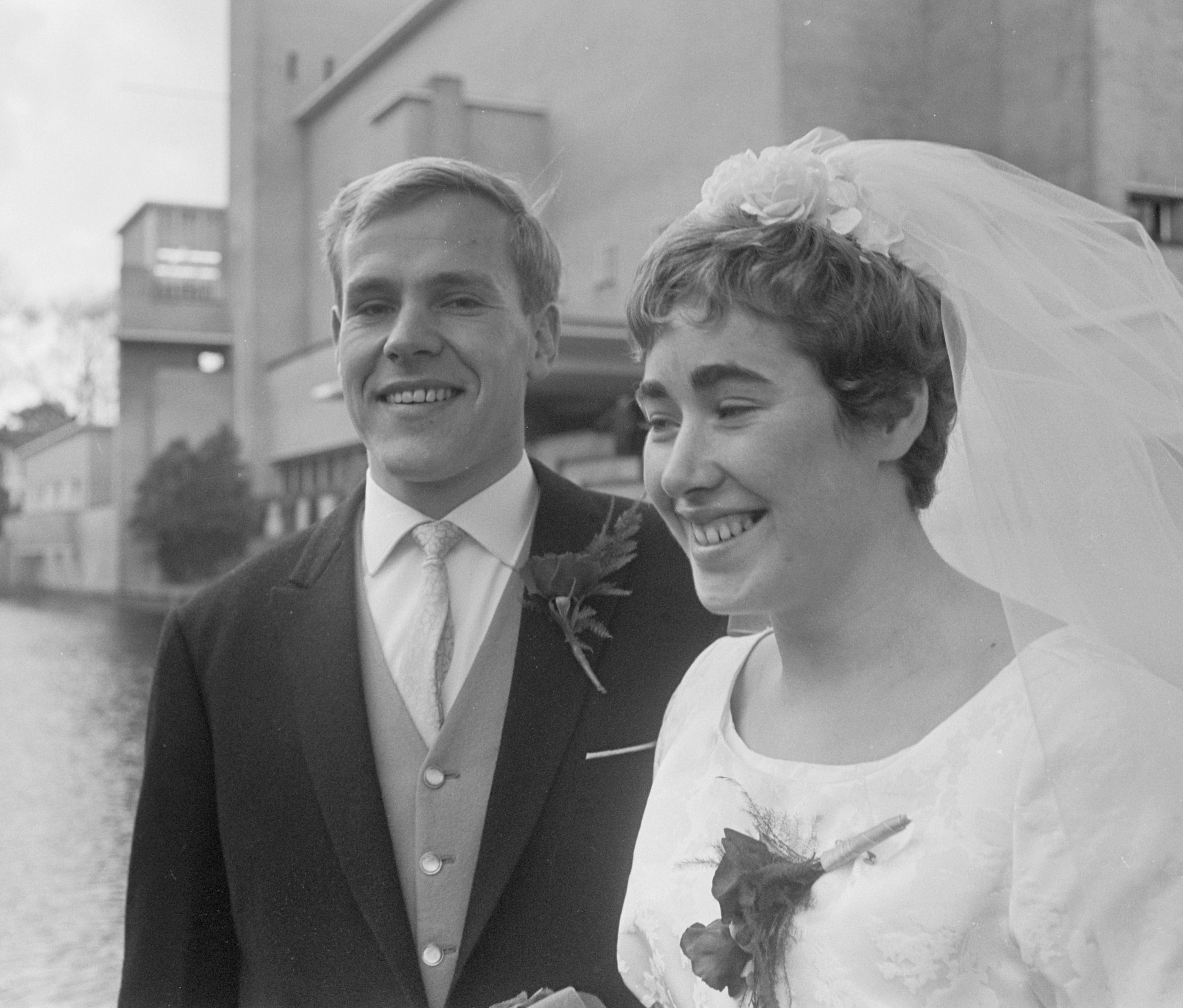
Lasterie marrying cyclist Cor Rutgers on 3 November 1965 in Hilversum.

Lasterie competed in the 1964 Summer Olympics, where she won a silver-medal with the Dutch 4 × 100 m medley team. She swam the butterfly leg in the first heat, but did not swim in the final, where Ada Kok took her place. She also won three gold medals at the 1962 European Aquatics Championships. In 1961–1962 she set four European and ten national records in various freestyle and medley events.
