= Leopoldo Rodés =

Spanish swimmer

Personal information
- Nationality: Spanish
- Born: 7 February 1939 (age 87) Barcelona, Spain

Sport
- Sport: Swimming

Leopoldo Rodés (born 7 February 1939) is a Spanish former swimmer. He competed in the men's 100 metre freestyle at the 1960 Summer Olympics.
