= 1962 European Aquatics Championships =

Water sport competitions

10th European Aquatics Championships
- Host city: Leipzig
- Country: East Germany
- Events: 23
- Opening: 18 August 1962
- Closing: 25 August 1962

The 1962 European Aquatics Championships were held in Leipzig, East Germany from 18 to 25 August 1962. Titles were contested in swimming, diving and water polo (men). In the men's swimming program, the 100 m backstroke had been replaced by the 200 m backstroke. Furthermore, the 400 m individual medley and the 4 × 100 m freestyle relay were introduced. In women's swimming, the 400 m individual medley was introduced.

== Medal table ==
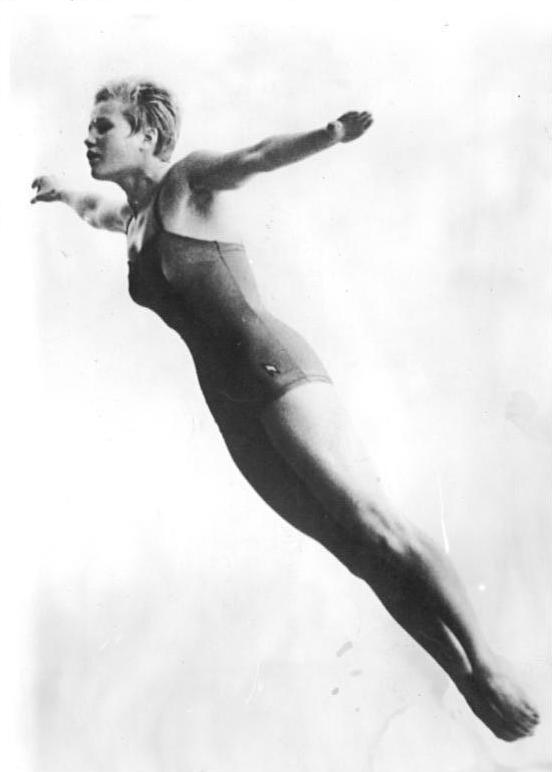
Ingrid Krämer won two gold medals

* Host nation (East Germany)

| Rank | Nation | Gold | Silver | Bronze | Total |
|---|---|---|---|---|---|
| 1 | Netherlands | 6 | 5 | 5 | 16 |
| 2 | East Germany* | 5 | 5 | 7 | 17 |
| 3 | Soviet Union | 4 | 4 | 3 | 11 |
| 4 | Great Britain | 2 | 5 | 2 | 9 |
| 5 | France | 2 | 1 | 0 | 3 |
| 6 | Hungary | 2 | 0 | 3 | 5 |
| 7 | Sweden | 1 | 2 | 2 | 5 |
| 8 | Austria | 1 | 0 | 0 | 1 |
| 9 | Spain | 0 | 1 | 0 | 1 |
| 9 | Yugoslavia | 0 | 1 | 0 | 1 |
| Totals (10 entries) | | 23 | 24 | 22 | 69 |

== Medal summary ==
=== Diving ===
Men's events

| Event | Gold | | Silver | | Bronze | |
|---|---|---|---|---|---|---|
| 3 m springboard | Kurt Mrkwicka (AUT) | 147.21 | Hans-Dieter Pophal (GDR) | 145.70 | Boris Polulyakh (URS) | 145.20 |
| 10 m platform | Brian Phelps (GBR) | 150.81 | Rolf Sperling (GDR) | 148.24 | Gennadiy Galkin (URS) | 143.18 |

Women's events

| Event | Gold | | Silver | | Bronze | |
|---|---|---|---|---|---|---|
| 3 m springboard | Ingrid Krämer (GDR) | 153.57 | Christiane Lanzke (GDR) | 137.78 | Natalya Kuznetsova (URS) | 133.78 |
| 10 m platform | Ingrid Krämer (GDR) | 107.96 | Ninel Krutova (URS) | 95.92 | Gabriele Schöpe (GDR) | 90.88 |

=== Swimming ===
==== Men's events ====
| Event | Gold | | Silver | | Bronze | |
|---|---|---|---|---|---|---|
| 100 m freestyle | Alain Gottvallès (FRA) | 55.0 | Per-Ola Lindberg (SWE) | 55.5 | Ron Kroon (NED) | 55.5 |
| 400 m freestyle | Johan Bontekoe (NED) | 4:25.6 | Hans Rosendahl (SWE) | 4:25.8 | Frank Wiegand (GDR) | 4:26.8 |
| 1500 m freestyle | József Katona (HUN) | 17:49.5 | Miguel Torres (ESP) | 17:55.6 | Richard Campion (GBR) | 17:59.8 |
| 200 m backstroke | Leonid Barbier (URS) | 2:16.6 | Wolfgang Wagner (GDR) | 2:17.9 | József Csikány (HUN) | 2:18.5 |
| 200 m breaststroke | Georgy Prokopenko (URS) | 2:32.8 | Ivan Karetnikov (URS) | 2:33.2 | Rob van Empel (NED) | 2:38.1 |
| 200 m butterfly | Valentin Kuzmin (URS) | 2:14.2 | Brian Jenkins (GBR) | 2:15.6 | Wolfgang Sieber (GDR) | 2:18.0 |
| 400 m individual medley | Gennady Androsov (URS) | 5:01.3 | Jan Jiskoot (NED) | 5:05.5 | Jürgen Bachmann (GDR) | 5:05.9 |
| 4 × 100 m freestyle relay | France; Alain Gottvallès; Jean-Pascal Curtillet; Robert Christophe; Gérard Gropaiz | 3:43.7 | Great Britain; Bob McGregor; John Martin-Dye; Peter Kendrew; Stanley Clarke | 3:44.7 | Sweden; Bengt-Olof Nordvall; Jan Lundin; Mats Svensson; Per-Ola Lindberg | 3:45.0 |
| 4 × 200 m freestyle relay | Sweden; Hans Rosendahl; Per-Ola Lindberg; Mats Svensson; Lars-Erik Bengtsson | 8:18.4 | France; Gérard Gropaiz; Alain Gottvallès; Jean-Pascal Curtillet; Robert Christophe | 8:20.4 | East Germany; Joachim Herbst; Martin Klink; Frank Wiegand; Volker Frischke | 8:24.6 |
| 4 × 100 m medley relay | East Germany; Jürgen Dietze; Egon Henninger; Horst-Günter Gregor; Frank Wiegand | 4:09.0 | Soviet Union; Veliko Siymar; Leonid Kolesnikov; Valentin Kuzmin; Viktor Konoplyov | 4:10.3 | Netherlands; Jan Weeteling; Wieger Mensonides; Jan Jiskoot; Ron Kroon | 4:10.9 |

==== Women's events ====
| Event | Gold | | Silver | | Bronze | |
|---|---|---|---|---|---|---|
| 100 m freestyle | Heidi Pechstein (GDR) | 1:03.3 | Diana Wilkinson (GBR) | 1:03.3 | Ineke Tigelaar (NED) | 1:03.3 |
| 400 m freestyle | Adrie Lasterie (NED) | 4:52.4 | Ineke Tigelaar (NED) | 4:57.3 | Elisabeth Ljunggren (SWE) | 4:58.1 |
| 100 m backstroke | Ria van Velsen (NED) | 1:10.5 | Corrie Winkel (NED) | 1:10.7 | Veronika Holletz (GDR) | 1:11.3 |
| 200 m breaststroke | Anita Lonsbrough (GBR) | 2:50.2 | Klenie Bimolt (NED) | 2:51.2 | Ursula Küper (GDR) | 2:52.2 |
| 100 m butterfly | Ada Kok (NED) | 1:09.0 | Ute Noack (GDR) | 1:10.0 | Marianne Heemskerk (NED) | 1:10.3 |
| 400 m individual medley | Adrie Lasterie (NED) | 5:27.8 | Anita Lonsbrough (GBR) | 5:32.3 | Márta Egerváry (HUN) | 5:33.3 |
| 4 × 100 m freestyle relay | Netherlands; Cocky Gastelaars; Adrie Lasterie; Erica Terpstra; Ineke Tigelaar | 4:15.1 | Great Britain; Linda Amos; Adrienne Brenner; Jennifer Thompson; Diana Wilkinson | 4:16.3 | Hungary; Maria Frank; Zsuzsa Kovács; Csilla Dobai-madarász; Katalin Takacs | 4:17.5 |
| 4 × 100 m medley relay | East Germany; Ingrid Schmidt; Barbara Göbel; Ute Noack; Heidi Pechstein | 4:40.1 | Netherlands; Ria van Velsen; Klenie Bimolt; Ada Kok; Ineke Tigelaar | 4:42.9 | Great Britain; Linda Ludgrove; Anita Lonsbrough; Mary-Anne Cotterill; Diana Wilkinson | 4:46.2 |

=== Water polo ===
| Event | Gold | Silver | Bronze |
|---|---|---|---|
| Men's competition | Hungary | Soviet Union; Yugoslavia | none |

== See also ==
- List of European Championships records in swimming
