= Georges Welbes =

Luxembourgish swimmer

Personal information
- Born: 11 June 1944 (age 82) Luxembourg, Luxembourg

Sport
- Sport: Swimming

Georges Welbes (born 11 June 1944) is a Luxembourgish former swimmer. He competed in the men's 100 metre freestyle at the 1964 Summer Olympics.
