= Gabriele Schöpe =

German diver

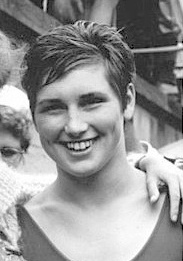
- Gabriele Schöpe in 1962

Personal information
- Born: 2 April 1944 (age 82) Dresden, Germany
- Height: 1.67 m (5 ft 6 in)
- Weight: 60 kg (130 lb)

Sport
- Sport: Diving
- Club: SC Einheit Dresden
Medal record
Representing East Germany
European Championships
Bronze medal – third place	1962 Leipzig	Platform
Bronze medal – third place	1966 Utrecht	Platform

Gabriele Schöpe (later Gabriele Krauß, born 2 April 1944) is a retired German diver. She competed at the 1960 Summer Olympics in the 10 m platform and finished in 15th place. She won two bronze medals in this event at the 1962 and 1966 European championships.
