= Jindřich Vágner =

Czech swimmer

Personal information
- Born: 19 September 1943 (age 82) Strakonice, Czechoslovakia

Sport
- Sport: Swimming

Jindřich Vágner (born 19 September 1943) is a Czech former swimmer. He competed in the men's 100 metre freestyle at the 1964 Summer Olympics.
