= Martin Klink =

German swimmer (born 1940)

Personal information
- Born: 25 September 1940 (age 85) Apolda, Germany
- Height: 1.74 m (5 ft 9 in)
- Weight: 73 kg (161 lb)

Sport
- Sport: Swimming
- Club: SC Leipzig, Leipzig
Medal record
Men's swimming
Representing East Germany
European Championships
Bronze medal – third place	1962 Leipzig	4×200 m freestyle

Martin Klink (born 25 September 1940) is a retired German swimmer who won a bronze medal at the 1962 European Aquatics Championships. He also competed at the 1964 Summer Olympics but was eliminated in preliminaries.
