= Volker Frischke =

German swimmer

Personal information
- Born: 1944 (age 81–82)

Sport
- Sport: Swimming
- Club: SC Dynamo Berlin
Medal record
Representing East Germany
European Championships
Bronze medal – third place	1962 Leipzig	4×200 m freestyle

Volker Frischke (born c. 1944) is a German swimmer who won a bronze medal in the 4×200 m freestyle relay at the 1962 European Aquatics Championships. He also won two national titles in the 200 m butterfly event in 1962 and 1963.

After retirement from competition he worked as a swimming coach, eventually becoming a national team coach and a top manager of SC Dynamo Berlin, the club where he trained. He was involved in the East German doping program. In October 1997 he was charged with giving anabolic steroids to teenager swimmers without the knowledge (the drugs were said to be vitamin supplements) thereby causing bodily harm. As a result, he was relieved from coaching duties and fined for DM 5,000, without receiving a criminal record. His past trainees included Kerstin Kielgass, Daniela Hunger and Manuela Stellmach.
