= Bruce Hunter (swimmer) =

American swimmer

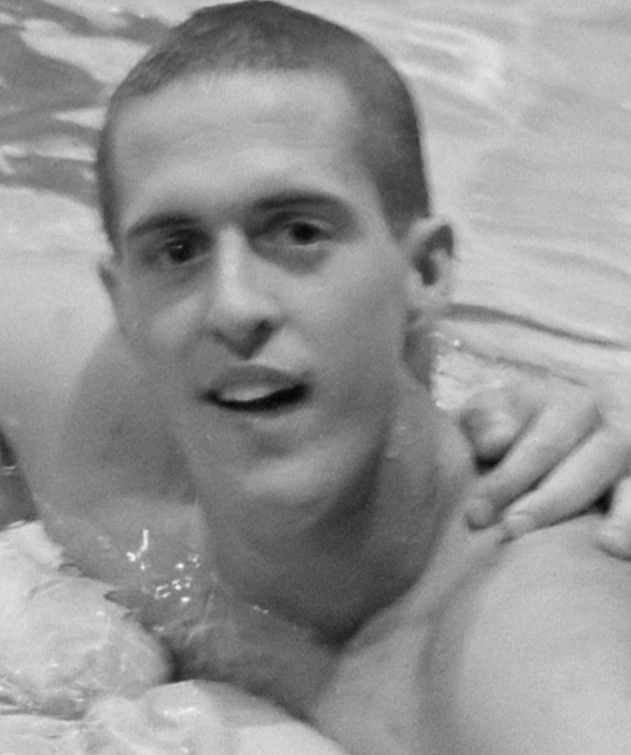
- Hunter in 1960

Personal information
- Full name: Richard Bruce Hunter
- National team: United States
- Born: July 6, 1939 Boston, Massachusetts, U.S.
- Died: July 6, 2018 (aged 79) Braintree, Massachusetts, U.S.
- Education: Harvard University; B.A. English Literature (1961); M.B.A. (1974)
- Occupations: Finance and Investment Manager
- Height: 6 ft 1 in (1.85 m)
- Weight: 174 lb (79 kg)
- Spouses: Barbara Ann Allabough; Ruth McFarlane Hunter; Faith Louise Van Nice
- Children: Kristen (From Ruth Hunter)

Sport
- Sport: Swimming
- Strokes: Freestyle
- Club: Cambridge YMCA
- College team: Harvard University
- Coach: Bill Brooks (Harvard); Gus Stager (60 Olympics)
Medal record
Representing Harvard
NCAA
Gold medal – first place	1960 University Park	50 yard freestyle

Richard Bruce Hunter (July 6, 1939 – July 6, 2018) was an American competition swimmer who competed for Harvard University and represented the United States at the 1960 Summer Olympics in Rome, where he competed in the 100-meter freestyle. After completing an MBA from Harvard in 1974, he worked as a Business Manager for State Street Bank, the tech firm Raytheon, and Fidelity Investments from 1975-2003.

== Early life ==
Bruce Hunter was born July 6, 1939, in greater Boston, Massachusetts, to Anne Gertrude Reagan, and James Hunter. Bruce's father James worked in sales for Jordan Marsh, who helped cover Bruce's travel expenses to the Rome Olympics. In his early years, Bruce attended Junior High at Our Lady of the Assumption, Green Harbor. Representing Our Lady in the Cadet Division at the Catholic Youth Organization Meet at Charleston, Massachusett's White Pool on August 24, 1952, he won both the 25-yard freestyle in 15.1 seconds and the 25-yard backstroke in 17.5 seconds. In September, 1952, winning the 30-yard freestyle and backstroke events at the City of Cambridge Swimming Championships, he was selected as the Outstanding Male performer.

== High School ==
In 1957, Hunter graduated Cambridge Latin School. As the sole swimmer representing Cambridge Latin High, which had neither a team or pool, he was a six-time Interscholastic All American. He learned to swim as a sprinter at the Cambridge YMCA, where he continued to train through High School.

== Harvard University ==
Hunter attended Harvard University, enrolling in 1957, and graduating in 1961 with a B.A. in English Literature. Specializing in sprint freestyle while swimming for Harvard under Coach Bill Brooks, Bruce was a 100-freestyle Eastern College Athletic College Champion in 1960, captaining the team in his Senior year. While swimming at Harvard, Hunter established eight records in freestyle for the varsity team, and won NCAA championships in both the 50-yard freestyle sprint event, and as a member of Harvard's 4x100 yard freestyle relay team. Bruce's younger brother Dennis also swam varsity at Harvard. Bob Kaufmann, both a Harvard, and Olympic team mate, attributed Hunter's success partly to a strong and effective program of weight-lifting and dryland training. Bruce would earn an MBA from Harvard Business School in 1974, majoring in finance and investments.

=== Naval service ===
After college graduation, Hunter served in the Navy around 1961, where competing in the International Military Games, he captured three gold medals in swimming. He trained for the 1964 Olympic games in Tokyo while training and competing in swimming internationally with the Navy, but did not qualify for the team.

Hunter was married to Barbara Ann Allabough, and Ruth McFarlane Hunter, though both marriages terminated in divorce. He later married Faith Louise Van Nice.

In the 1960 Olympic swimming trials, in the 100-meter freestyle Hunter placed second, qualifying him for the team, and finishing just ahead of Jeff Farrell who had recently undergone an apendectomy and was recovering.

== 1960 Rome Olympics ==
Hunter swam in the men's 100-meter freestyle, at the 1960 Rome Olympics, where he advanced to the finals, and finished fourth overall with a time of 55.6 seconds, only .2 seconds away from the bronze medal. Hunter was managed at the Olympics by Michigan Coach, and Hall of Fame inductee Gus Stager. John Devitt of Australia won the gold with a time of 55.2, Lance Larson of the U.S. won the silver with a time of 55.1, and Manuel dos Santos of Brazil won the bronze with a time of 55.4. A discrepancy for the order of finish for Larson and Devitt was resolved by going with the electronic timers, despite the U.S. lodging an unsuccessful protest.

After his elite swimming career, Hunter remained active in the swimming community and trained and competed with the New England Masters Swim Club Chapter of United States Masters Swimming, where he had top 10 finishes in over 30 events, competing most regularly between 1973-1996. He also coached a few Masters programs in his spare time. As recreational pursuits, he enjoyed skiing, sky diving, and was a skilled golfer.

=== Honors ===
In 1986 Hunter became a member of the Hall of Fame for the Varsity Club at Harvard. He was a recipient of the American Spirit of Honor medal while serving in the U.S. Navy. He had the honor of serving as a President of the US Olympians's New England Chapter.

=== Careers ===
From 1975-2003, Hunter worked for firms that included State Street Bank, the tech firm Raytheon, and Fidelity Investments.

Hunter died at age 79 on July 6, 2018 at his home in the suburb of Braintree in his native town of greater Boston, Massachusetts, survived by a daughter and siblings. Strokes had left him in declining health over the prior years, beginning with a severe stroke around 2015.

== See also ==
- List of Harvard University people
