= Ineke Tigelaar =

Dutch swimmer (born 1945)

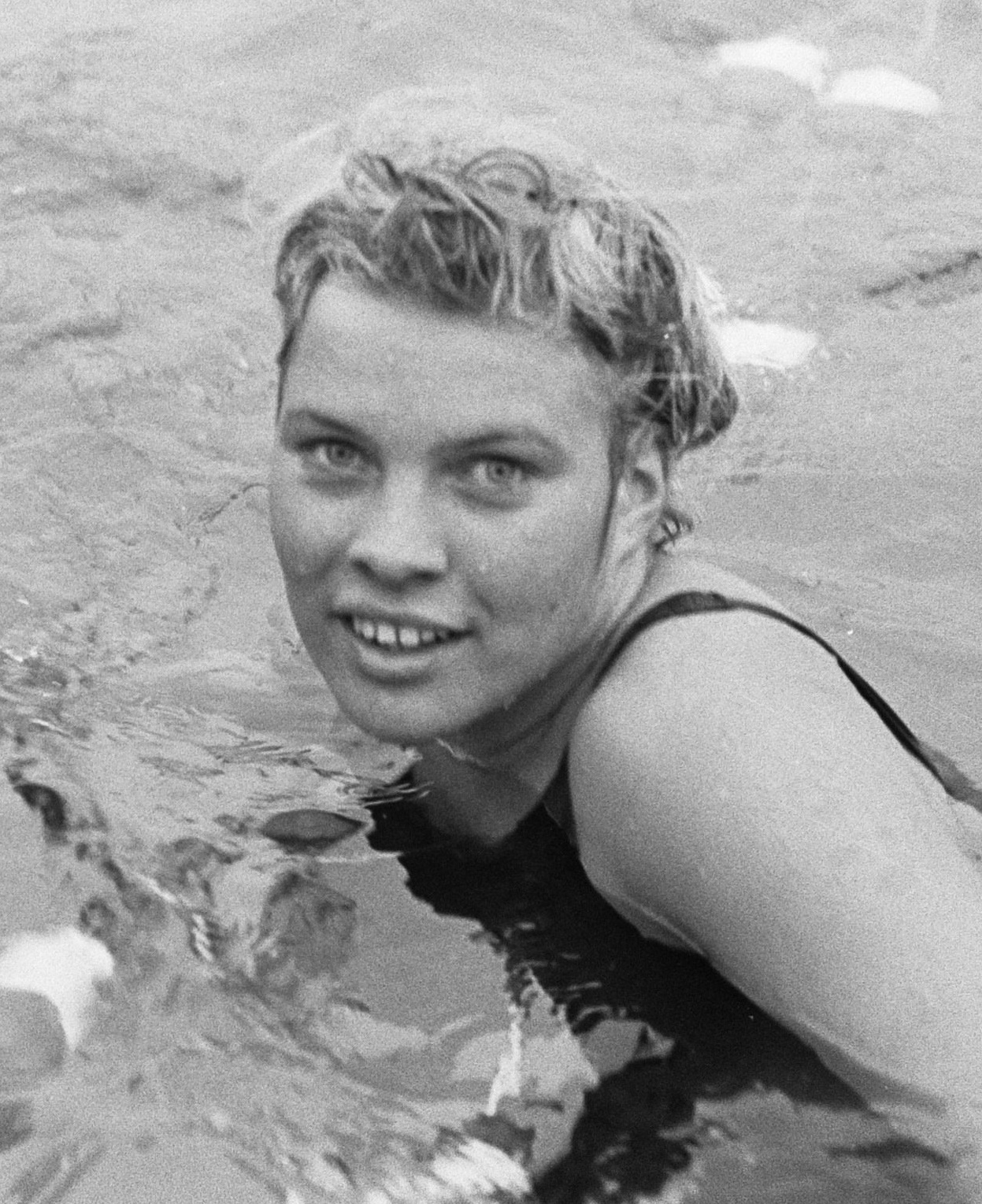
- Ineke Tigelaar in 1963

Personal information
- Born: 9 October 1945 (age 80) Hilversum, the Netherlands
- Height: 1.67 m (5 ft 6 in)
- Weight: 59 kg (130 lb)

Sport
- Sport: Swimming
- Club: De Robben, Hilversum
Medal record
Representing the Netherlands
European Championships
Gold medal – first place	1962 Leipzig	4×100 m freestyle
Silver medal – second place	1962 Leipzig	4×100 m medley
Silver medal – second place	1962 Leipzig	400 m freestyle
Bronze medal – third place	1962 Leipzig	100 m freestyle

Willemina Hendrika "Ineke" Tigelaar (born 9 October 1945) is a Dutch former freestyle swimmer who competed in the 1964 Summer Olympics. She won four medals at the 1962 European Aquatics Championships, including one gold in the 4 × 100 m freestyle relay. Between 1961 and 1964 she won six national titles in the 100 m, 400 m and 1500 m freestyle events. In 1962 and 1964 she was part of the Dutch teams that set new European records in the 4 × 100 m freestyle relay.
