= Gojko Arneri =

Croatian swimmer (1935–1983)

Personal information
- Born: 29 August 1935 Požarevac, Yugoslavia
- Died: 23 February 1983 (aged 47) Zagreb, Croatia

Sport
- Sport: Swimming

Gojko Arneri (29 August 1935 – 23 February 1983) was a Croatian swimmer. He competed in the men's 100 metre freestyle at the 1960 Summer Olympics.
