= Boris Poluliakhi =

Soviet diver

Personal information
- Nationality: Soviet
- Born: 10 June 1938 (age 88) Tbilisi, Georgia

Sport
- Sport: Diving
Medal record
Men's diving
Representing Soviet Union
European Championships
Bronze medal – third place	1962 Leipzig	3 m springboard

Boris Poluliakhi (born 10 June 1938) is a Soviet diver. He competed at the 1964 Summer Olympics and the 1968 Summer Olympics.
