= Gennady Galkin =

Soviet diver (1934–1985)

Personal information
- Born: 14 May 1934 Lakino, Sobinsky District, Vladimir Oblast, Russian SFSR, Soviet Union
- Died: 11 April 1985 (aged 50) Moscow, Soviet Union
- Height: 1.68 m (5 ft 6 in)
- Weight: 68 kg (150 lb)

Sport
- Sport: Diving
- Club: Burevestnik Moscow, Dynamo Moscow
Medal record
Representing the Soviet Union
European Championships
Bronze medal – third place	1962 Leipzig	Platform

Gennady Aleksandrovich Galkin (Russian: Геннадий Александрович Галкин, 14 May 1934 – 11 April 1985) was a Soviet diver. He competed in the 10 m platform at the 1956 and 1960 Summer Olympics and finished in 13th and 6th place, respectively. He won a bronze medal in this discipline at the 1962 European Aquatics Championships, as well as five national titles in 1956, 1957, 1960, 1961 and 1963.

He graduated from the Moscow State University and held a PhD in physics.
