= Walter Ledgard =

Peruvian swimmer

Personal information
- Born: 25 October 1915 Lima, Peru
- Died: 8 March 1999 (aged 83)

Sport
- Sport: Swimming

Walter Ledgard (25 October 1915 – 8 March 1999) was a Peruvian swimmer. He competed in the men's 400 meters freestyle at the 1936 Summer Olympics. He later became the trainer of Rosario Vivanco.
