= Mike Austin (swimmer) =

American swimmer (born 1943)

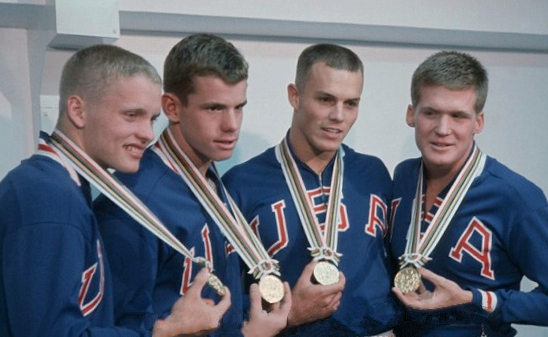
- Schollander, Ilman, Austin and Clark display gold medals at 1964 Olympics

Personal information
- Full name: Michael MacKay Austin
- Nickname: "Mike"
- National team: United States
- Born: August 26, 1943 (age 82) West Orange, New Jersey, U.S.
- Height: 6 ft 1 in (185 cm)
- Weight: 187 lb (85 kg)

Sport
- Sport: Swimming
- Strokes: Freestyle
- Club: New Haven Swim Club
- College team: Yale University
- Coach: Phil Moriarty (Yale)
Medal record
Men's swimming
Representing the United States
Olympic Games
Gold medal – first place	1964 Tokyo	4×100 m freestyle relay

Michael MacKay Austin (born August 26, 1943) is an American retired swimmer who competed for Yale University and was a 1964 Tokyo Olympic champion in the 4 × 100 m freestyle relay.

== Early swimming ==
In July of 1957 Austin swam for the Sherman Oaks, California team under coach Tony Dandeneau where he competed in the Western States Invitational Championships in Santa Monica. He was a swim star for the Van Nuys High School Wolves in Los Angeles, before moving to Rochester, New York in 1958. As his Rochester area High School lacked a pool, he swam with the Buffalo Athletic Club under Coach Chuck Baldwin. In January, 1959, he swam the 100-yard freestyle in :53 seconds and had recorded a time of :58 seconds for the 100-yard butterfly. Austin was ranked first in the nation in his age group in the 100-yard free and butterfly, and in the 400 freestyle relay.

== Yale University ==
Austin attended Yale University, where he swam for coach Phil Moriarty's Yale Bulldogs swimming and diving team in National Collegiate Athletic Association (NCAA) and Ivy League competition from 1962 to 1964. As a Yale Freshman in March, 1961, he set a record in New Haven as part of a 440-yard freestyle relay team that swam a 3:15.9 at the National AAU Indoor Swimming Championships. Austin's own split time was a :47.7. He captained the 1964 Yale swim team that placed first at the EISL Championship and third at the NCAAs. At Senior Nationals in 1963, he anchored the American-record 400 freestyle championship relay. He also won the 1964 NCAA championship in the 50 freestyle and was an anchor of Yale's NCAA championship and NCAA record-setting 400 freestyle relays in 1963 and 1964, swimming one of the fastest relay splits in history.

In August 1963, swimming with the New Haven Swim Club during a summer break, he came in second in the 100-meter freestyle with a time of 55.2 at the National AAU Outdoor Meet in Chicago. He graduated from Yale with his bachelor's degree in 1964. Austin donated his Olympic gold medal to his alma mater in 2006.

== 1964 Tokyo Olympic gold ==
He represented the United States at the 1964 Summer Olympics in Tokyo, Japan, and won a gold medal in the 4 × 100 m freestyle relay with teammates Steve Clark, Gary Ilman and Don Schollander, setting a new world record of 3:33.2. Individually, he placed sixth in the 100 m freestyle with a time of 54.5 seconds.

In later years, he worked in the financial field, where he labored overseas for many years before coming back to America and taking a position as CFO for Cambridge, Massachusetts's Strategic Science and Technologies LLC, currently a biotechnology company.

== See also ==
- List of Olympic medalists in swimming (men)
- List of Yale University people
- World record progression 4 × 100 metres freestyle relay
