= Horst Löffler =

German swimmer

Personal information
- Born: March 17, 1942 (age 84) Langenau, Germany

Sport
- Sport: Swimming
Medal record
Representing Germany
Olympic Games
Silver medal – second place	1964 Tokyo	4x100 m freestyle relay

Horst Löffler (born 17 March 1942) is a German former swimmer who competed in the 1964 Summer Olympics.
