= Lary Schulhof =

American swimmer

Personal information
- Full name: Lary Alan Schulhof
- National team: United States
- Born: June 15, 1942 (age 84) Muncie, Indiana, U.S.
- Education: Indiana University; Indiana University School of Medicine
- Occupation: Neurosurgeon
- Height: 5 ft 10 in (1.78 m)
- Weight: 165 lb (75 kg)

Sport
- Sport: Swimming
- Strokes: Butterfly and Freestyle
- Club: Indianapolis Athletic Club
- College team: Indiana University
- Coach: James Counsilman (Indiana U.)

Lary Alan Schulhof (born July 15, 1942) is an American former competition swimmer who competed for Indiana University, and a national, Olympic and world record-holder. After graduating Indiana Medical School, he practiced as a neurological surgeon in Ashville, North Carolina.

Schulhof was born July 15, 1942, in Muncie, Indiana. During his attendance at Burris High School, where he graduated in 1960, he earned an individual national High School record in he 100-yard butterfly with a time of 54.7 and was twice a state champion in the 100-yard event. Burris High School became independent of the Muncie School system in 1974, and is now known as the Burris Laboratory School.

== 1960 Olympic trials ==
At the 1960, Olympic trials in Detroit, Michigan, Schulhof finished 9th in his butterfly trial, just missing the finals.

== Indiana University ==
He attended Indiana University, where he swam for coach Doc Counsilman's Indiana Hoosiers swimming and diving team in National Collegiate Athletic Association (NCAA) competition from 1962 to 1964 but could not participate in the NCAA Championships due to the NCAA's 4 year ALL SPORTS probation of I.U. for football recruiting violations. At Indiana, where he pledged Sigma Alpha Epsilon Fraternity, Schulhof received varsity letters in 1964, 1963, and 1962, and co-captained the swim team in the 1963–64 season.

He was twice a national butterfly AAU champion and won eight international butterfly championships in Japan and Europe including East Germany between 1962 and 1964. Schulhof won the 100-yard butterfly in a time of 59.6 at the Midwest Swimming and Diving Championships in August, 1964.

== 1964 Tokyo Olympics ==
Schulhof represented the United States at the 1964 Summer Olympics in Tokyo, Japan where he was managed and trained by U.S. Olympic Head Coach James Counsilman, his former college coach. He swam for the gold medal-winning U.S. team in the preliminary heats of the men's 4×100-meter freestyle relay. Under the 1964 Olympic swimming rules, however, he did not receive a medal because he did not compete in the event final. He was inducted into the Indiana University Athletic Hall of Fame in 2012.

=== World relay record ===
Schulhof was part of a world-record-breaking 4x100-meter men's relay team on August 20, 1961, in Los Angeles California.

=== Honors ===
Schulhof became a member of the Indiana University Hall of Fame in 2012, and received the Gimball Award in 1964.

=== Career ===
He attended the Indiana University School of Medicine and completed a neurosurgery residence while in attendance at Indiana Medical. He pursued post-graduate studies in pediatric neurosurgery at Riley's Children's hospital, and continued to study micro-surgery in Gainesville, Florida, and Zurich, Switzerland. He went on to become a practicing Neurological Surgeon in Asheville N.C. from 1975 until his retirement in 2009, primarily performing back surgery.

== See also ==
- List of Indiana University (Bloomington) people
- World record progression 4 × 100 metres medley relay
