= Walter Ledgard Jr. =

Peruvian swimmer

Personal information
- Born: 3 January 1945 (age 81)
- Height: 182 cm (6 ft 0 in)
- Weight: 76 kg (168 lb)

Sport
- Sport: Swimming

Walter Ledgard Jr. (born 3 January 1945) is a Peruvian former freestyle swimmer. He competed in three events at the 1964 Summer Olympics.

He is the father of Olympic cyclist Tony Ledgard and the son of Olympic swimmer Walter Ledgard Sr.
