= William O'Donnell (swimmer) =

British swimmer

Bill O'Donnell
Personal information
- Full name: William O'Donnell
- Born: 30 June 1942 (age 84) Manchester, England
- Height: 185 cm (6 ft 1 in)
- Weight: 71 kg (157 lb)

Sport
- Sport: Swimming

William O'Donnell (born 30 June 1942) is a British former swimmer. He competed in the men's 100 metre freestyle at the 1960 Summer Olympics.
