= René Wagner (swimmer) =

Luxembourgish swimmer (born 1938)

Personal information
- Born: 7 May 1938 (age 88) Mamer, Luxembourg

Sport
- Sport: Swimming

René Wagner (born 7 May 1938) is a Luxembourgish former swimmer. He competed in the men's 100 metre freestyle at the 1960 Summer Olympics.
