= Jan Jiskoot =

Dutch swimmer (born 1940)

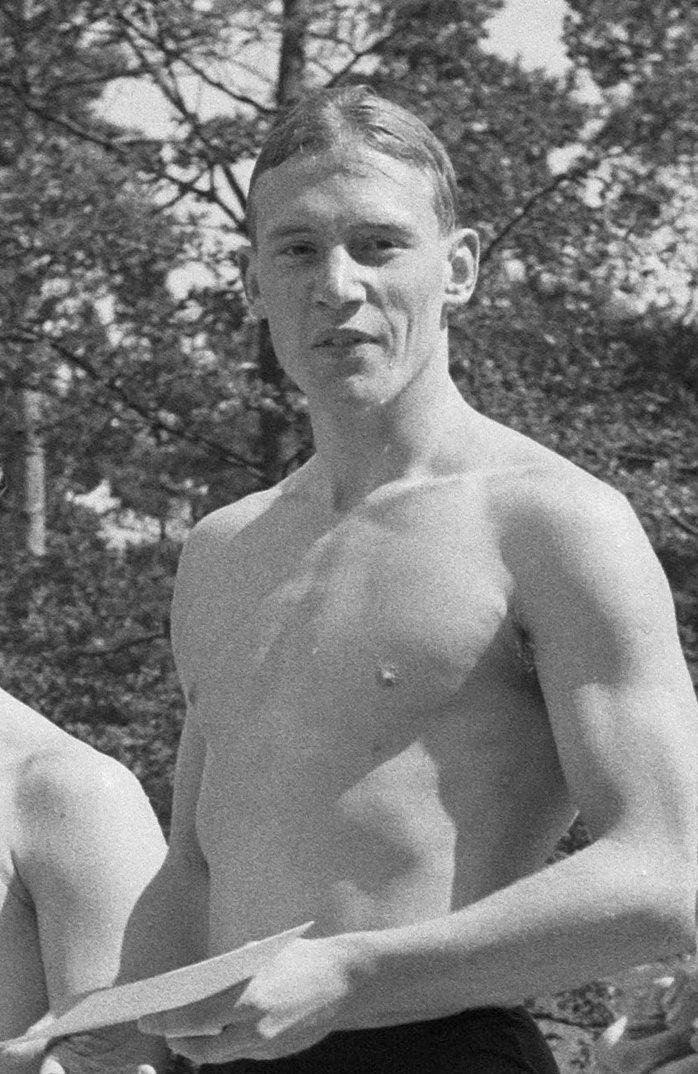
- Jan Jiskoot in 1960

Medal record

Men's swimming

Representing the Netherlands

European Championships
Silver medal – second place	1962 Leipzig	400 m medley
Bronze medal – third place	1962 Leipzig	4×100 m medley

Johannes "Jan" Jiskoot (born 3 March 1940 in Dordrecht) is a retired Dutch swimmer who won two medals in medley events at the 1962 European Aquatics Championships. He also participated in the 1960 and 1964 Summer Olympics and was sixth in the 400 m medley. He started as a backstroke swimmer, but then leaned more to butterfly and medley. On 18 September 1962 he set the European 100 m batterfly record at 0:59:50, becoming the first European to swim 100 m butterfly within one minute. Between 1960 and 1966 he was 14 times national champion and set more than 20 national records in various backstroke, butterfly and medley events.

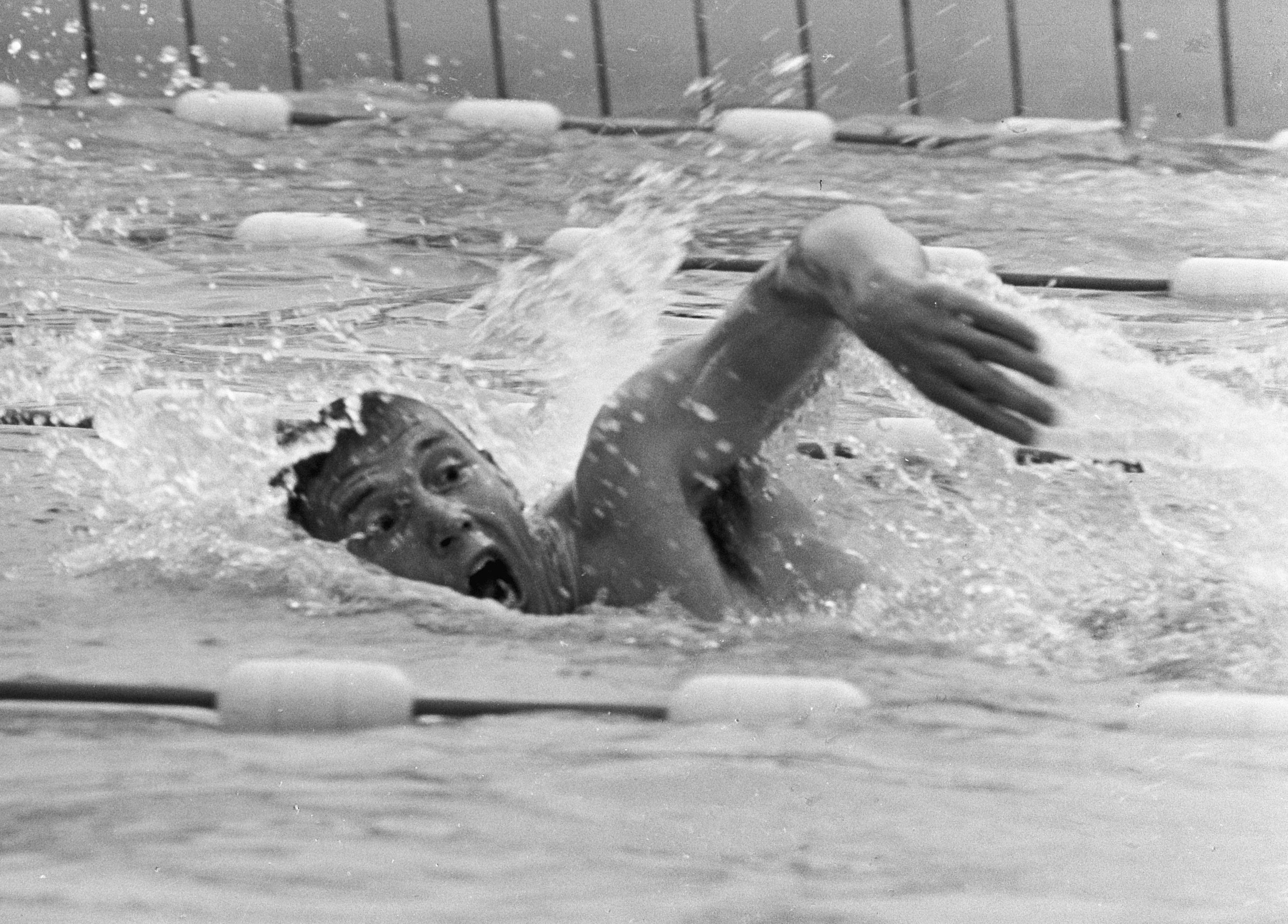
Jan Jiskoot in 1965

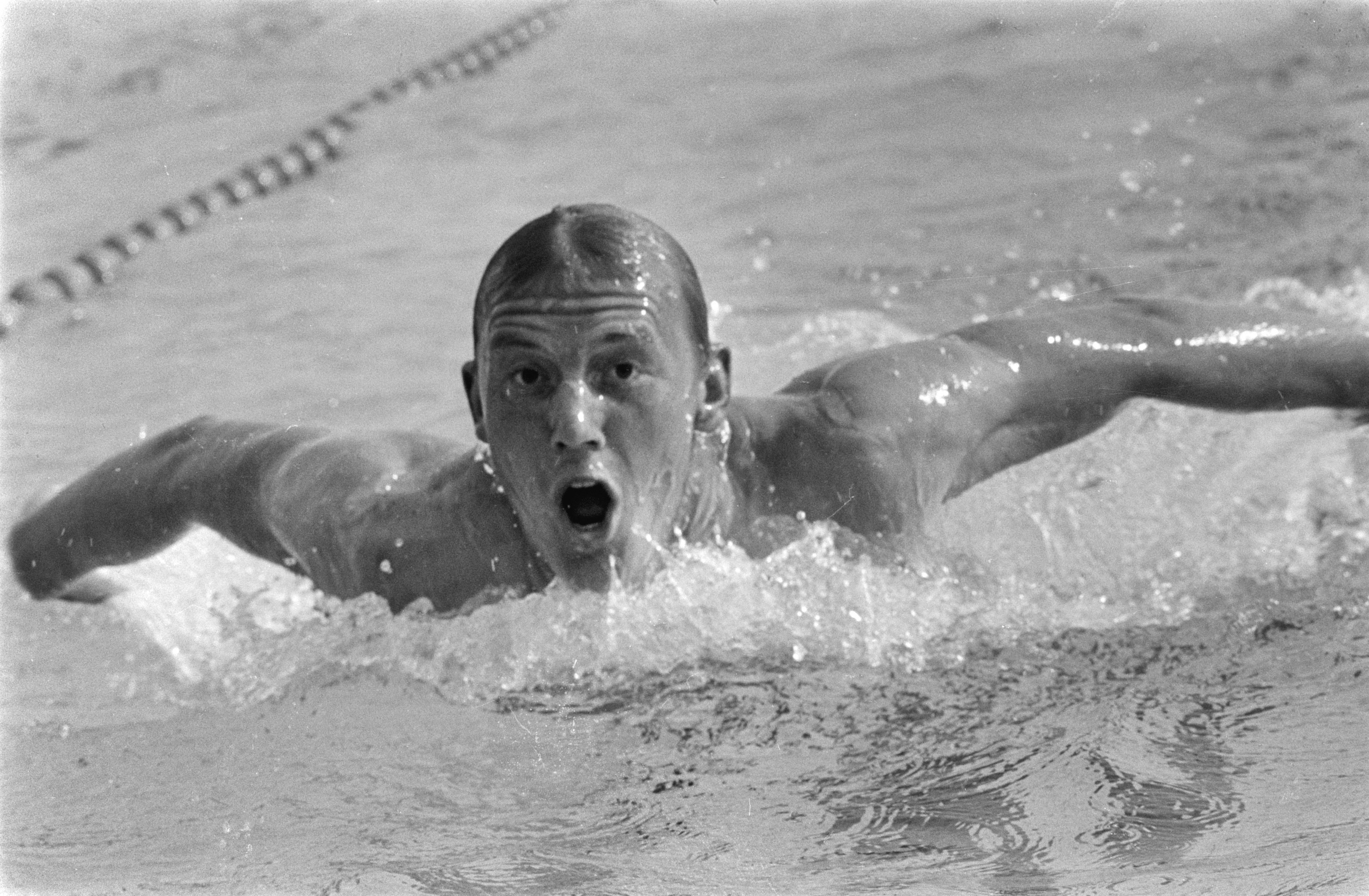
Jan Jiskoot in 1966
