= Hans-Joachim Klein (swimmer) =

German swimmer (born 1942)

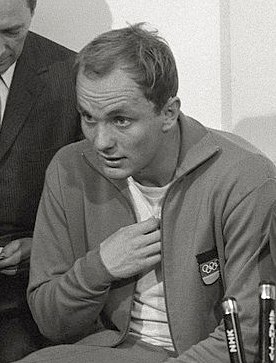
- Hans-Joachim Klein at the 1964 Olympics

Personal information
- Born: 20 August 1942 (age 83) Darmstadt, Germany
- Height: 1.85 m (6 ft 1 in)
- Weight: 80 kg (176 lb)

Sport
- Sport: Swimming
- Club: DSW 1912, Darmstadt
Medal record
Representing Germany
Olympic Games
| Silver medal – second place | 1964 Tokyo | 4×100 m freestyle |
| Silver medal – second place | 1964 Tokyo | 4×200 m freestyle |
| Silver medal – second place | 1964 Tokyo | 4×100 m medley |
| Bronze medal – third place | 1964 Tokyo | 100 m freestyle |
Representing West Germany
Summer Universiade
| Gold medal – first place | 1963 Porto Alegre | 100 m freestyle |
| Bronze medal – third place | 1963 Porto Alegre | 400 m freestyle |
| Gold medal – first place | 1965 Budapest | 100 m freestyle |

Hans-Joachim Klein (German pronunciation: [ˈhans joˈʔaxɪm ˈklaɪn]; born 20 August 1942) is a retired West German freestyle swimmer. He competed in various freestyle sprint events at the 1960 and 1964 Olympics and won three silver and one bronze medals in 1964. In 1965 he was elected as German Sportspersonality of the Year.

In 1962–1963 Klein studied industrial engineering at the University of Southern California. He later defended a PhD in Germany and went into politics and administration. In 1969–1985 he worked at the Hessian Economic and Traffic Ministry, between 1985 and 1997 was a Darmstadt District Administrator, and from 1997 until his retirement in 2008 was the manager of the Supply and Transport Company of Leipzig. In addition, in 2001–2007 he acted as president of the German Olympic Society.

== See also ==
- World record progression 200 metres freestyle

Awards
| Preceded by Willi Holdorf | German Sportsman of the Year; 1965 | Succeeded by Rudi Altig |
