= Rosario de Vivanco =

Peruvian swimmer (born 1949)

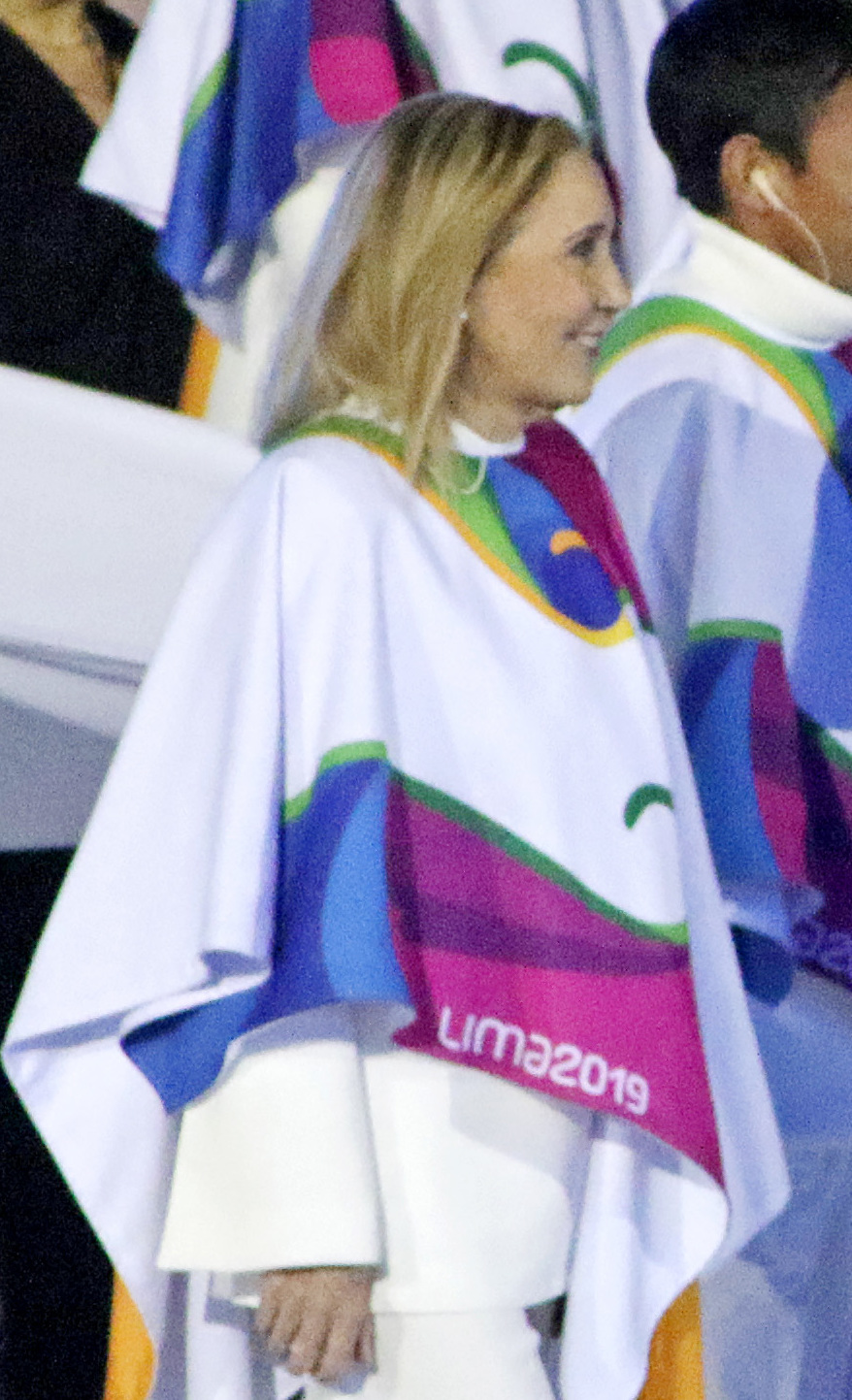
- Rosario de Vivanco in 2019.

Personal information
- Nickname: Choco
- Born: 3 July 1949 (age 77) Lima, Peru

Sport
- Sport: Swimming
- Strokes: freestyle

Rosario de Vivanco (born 3 July 1949) is a Peruvian former freestyle swimmer. She competed at the 1964 Summer Olympics and the 1968 Summer Olympics. She was the first woman to represent Peru at the Olympic Games.
