= Jean-Pascal Curtillet =

French swimmer (1942–2000)

Personal information
- Born: September 21, 1942 Algiers, French Algeria
- Died: March 6, 2000 (aged 57)

Sport
- Sport: Swimming
Medal record
Representing France
European Championships
Gold medal – first place	1962 Leipzig	4x100m freestyle relay
Silver medal – second place	1962 Leipzig	4x200m freestyle relay
Mediterranean Games
Gold medal – first place	1963 Naples	4x200m freestyle relay

Jean-Pascal Curtillet (21 September 1942 – 6 March 2000) was a French freestyle swimmer who competed in the 1960 Summer Olympics and in the 1964 Summer Olympics. He was born in Algiers, French Algeria.
