= Carlos Canepa (swimmer) =

Peruvian swimmer

Personal information
- Nationality: Peruvian
- Born: 7 March 1943 (age 83) Lima

Sport
- Sport: Swimming

Carlos Canepa (born 7 March 1943) is a Peruvian former freestyle and butterfly swimmer. He competed in three events at the 1964 Summer Olympics.
