= Antal Száll =

Hungarian swimmer

Personal information
- Nationality: Hungarian
- Born: 26 January 1944 (age 82) Budapest, Hungary

Sport
- Sport: Swimming

Antal Száll (born 26 January 1944) is a Hungarian former swimmer. He competed in two events at the 1964 Summer Olympics.
