= Vladimir Shuvalov =

Russian swimmer

Personal information
- Born: 3 October 1946 Moscow, USSR
- Died: 8 February 2019 (aged 72) Moscow, Russia
- Height: 1.81 m (5 ft 11 in)
- Weight: 73 kg (161 lb)

Sport
- Sport: Swimming
- Club: Dynamo Moscow
Medal record
Men's swimming
Representing Soviet Union
European Championships
Silver medal – second place	1966 Utrecht	4×100 m freestyle

Vladimir Shuvalov (Russian: Владимир Шувалов; 3 October 1946 – 8 February 2019) was a Soviet freestyle swimmer who won a silver medal at the 1966 European Aquatics Championships. He also competed at the 1964 Summer Olympics and finished fourth in the 4 × 100 m medley and sixth in the 4 × 100 m freestyle relay. Between 1963 and 1966 he set 12 national records in the 100 m and 4 × 100 m freestyle and 200 m and 4 × 100 m medley events.
