= Alain Gottvallès =

French swimmer (1942–2008)

Personal information
- Born: March 22, 1942 Casablanca, Morocco
- Died: February 28, 2008 (aged 65) Aubenas, Ardèche, France

Sport
- Sport: Swimming
Medal record
Representing France
European Championships
Gold medal – first place	1962 Leipzig	100 m freestyle
Gold medal – first place	1962 Leipzig	4×100 m freestyle
Silver medal – second place	1962 Leipzig	4×200 m freestyle
Mediterranean Games
Gold medal – first place	1963 Naples	100m freestyle

Alain Gottvallès (22 March 1942 – 28 February 2008) was a French swimmer, born in Casablanca, Morocco. He was world record holder of 52.9 seconds in 100 m freestyle in 1964, the first swimmer to complete the distance in less than 53 seconds. His record remained unbeaten until 1967.

He participated at the 1964 Summer Olympics in Tokyo, where he placed fifth in 100 metre freestyle.

He was also an actor, with notable roles in Mission spéciale à Caracas (1965) and L'homme qui trahit la mafia (1967).

== See also ==
- World record progression 100 metres freestyle
