= Uwe Jacobsen =

German swimmer (born 1940)

Personal information
- Born: September 22, 1940 (age 85) Aschersleben, Germany

Sport
- Sport: Swimming
Medal record
Representing Germany
Olympic Games
Silver medal – second place	1964 Tokyo	4x100 m freestyle relay

Uwe Jacobsen (born 22 September 1940) is a German former freestyle swimmer who competed in the 1960 Summer Olympics and in the 1964 Summer Olympics.
