= Yury Sumtsov =

Russian swimmer

Personal information
- Born: 4 September 1944 (age 81)

Sport
- Sport: Swimming

Yury Sumtsov (born 4 September 1944) is a Russian former swimmer. He competed in two events at the 1964 Summer Olympics for the Soviet Union.
