= Viktor Semchenkov =

Russian swimmer

Personal information
- Nationality: Russian
- Born: 6 December 1942 (age 83) Norilsk, Soviet Union

Sport
- Sport: Swimming

Viktor Semchenkov (born 6 December 1942) is a Russian former swimmer. He competed in three events at the 1964 Summer Olympics for the Soviet Union.
