= Tadaharu Goto =

Japanese swimmer (born 1941)

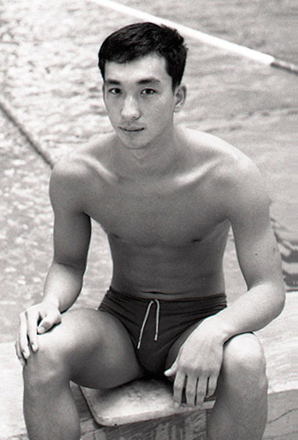
- Tadaharu Goto at the 1964 Olympics

Personal information
- Born: 4 December 1941 (age 84)
- Height: 1.82 m (6 ft 0 in)
- Weight: 72 kg (159 lb)

Sport
- Sport: Swimming
Medal record
Representing Japan
Asian Games
Gold medal – first place	1962 Jakarta	4×200 m freestyle
Silver medal – second place	1962 Jakarta	100 m freestyle
Silver medal – second place	1962 Jakarta	200 m freestyle

Tadaharu Goto (後藤 忠治, Gotō Tadaharu; born 4 December 1941) is a retired Japanese swimmer who won three medals at the 1962 Asian Games. He competed in the 100 m freestyle and 4 × 100 m freestyle relay events at the 1964 Summer Olympics and finished fourth in the relay.
