= Per-Ola Lindberg =

Swedish swimmer (1940–2022)

Perry Lindberg
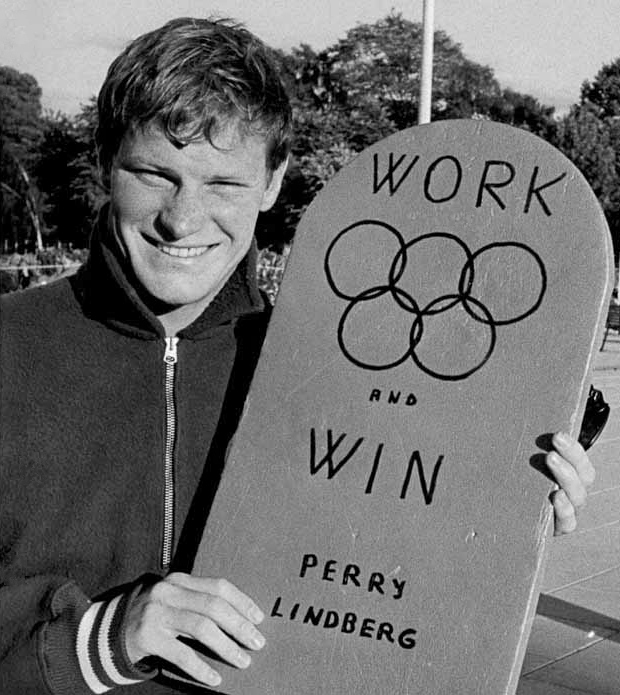
- Lindberg at the 1964 Olympics

Personal information
- Full name: Perry Ola Lindberg
- Nationality: Swedish
- Born: 24 March 1940 Kalmar, Sweden
- Died: 19 December 2022 (aged 82)
- Height: 175 cm (5 ft 9 in)
- Weight: 52 kg (115 lb)

Sport
- Sport: Swimming
- Strokes: Freestyle
- Club: SK Neptun, Stockholm
- College team: University of Southern California
Medal record
Representing Sweden
European Championships
Gold medal – first place	1962 Leipzig	4×200 m freestyle
Silver medal – second place	1962 Leipzig	100 m freestyle
Bronze medal – third place	1962 Leipzig	4×100 m freestyle

Per-Ola Lindberg (24 March 1940 – 19 December 2022) was a Swedish freestyle swimmer who competed at the 1960 and 1964 Summer Olympics. He placed fifth-sixth in the 4 × 100 m and 4 × 200 m relays, and finished eighth in the individual 100 m in 1960. He won three medals in these events at the 1962 European Aquatics Championships. He competed in NCAA Championships in 1963 and won 1st place for the 100 yd freestyle. His time was 47.1 seconds.

Lindberg later lived for half the year in Sweden, and the other half in California. He died on 19 December 2022, at the age of 82.
