= Luis Paz (swimmer) =

Peruvian swimmer

Personal information
- Born: 31 August 1945 (age 80)

Sport
- Sport: Swimming

Luis Paz (born 31 August 1945) is a Peruvian former freestyle and medley swimmer. He competed in three events at the 1964 Summer Olympics.
