= Gérard Gropaiz =

French swimmer (1943–2012)

Personal information
- Born: August 1, 1943 Paris, France
- Died: October 6, 2012 (aged 69)

Sport
- Sport: Swimming
Medal record
Representing France
European Championships
Gold medal – first place	1962 Leipzig	4x100m freestyle relay
Silver medal – second place	1962 Leipzig	4x200m freestyle relay
Mediterranean Games
Gold medal – first place	1963 Naples	4x200m freestyle relay

Gérard Gropaiz (1 August 1943 – 6 October 2012) was a French swimmer who competed at the 1960 Summer Olympics and in the 1964 Summer Olympics.
