= Ron Kroon =

Dutch swimmer (1942–2001)

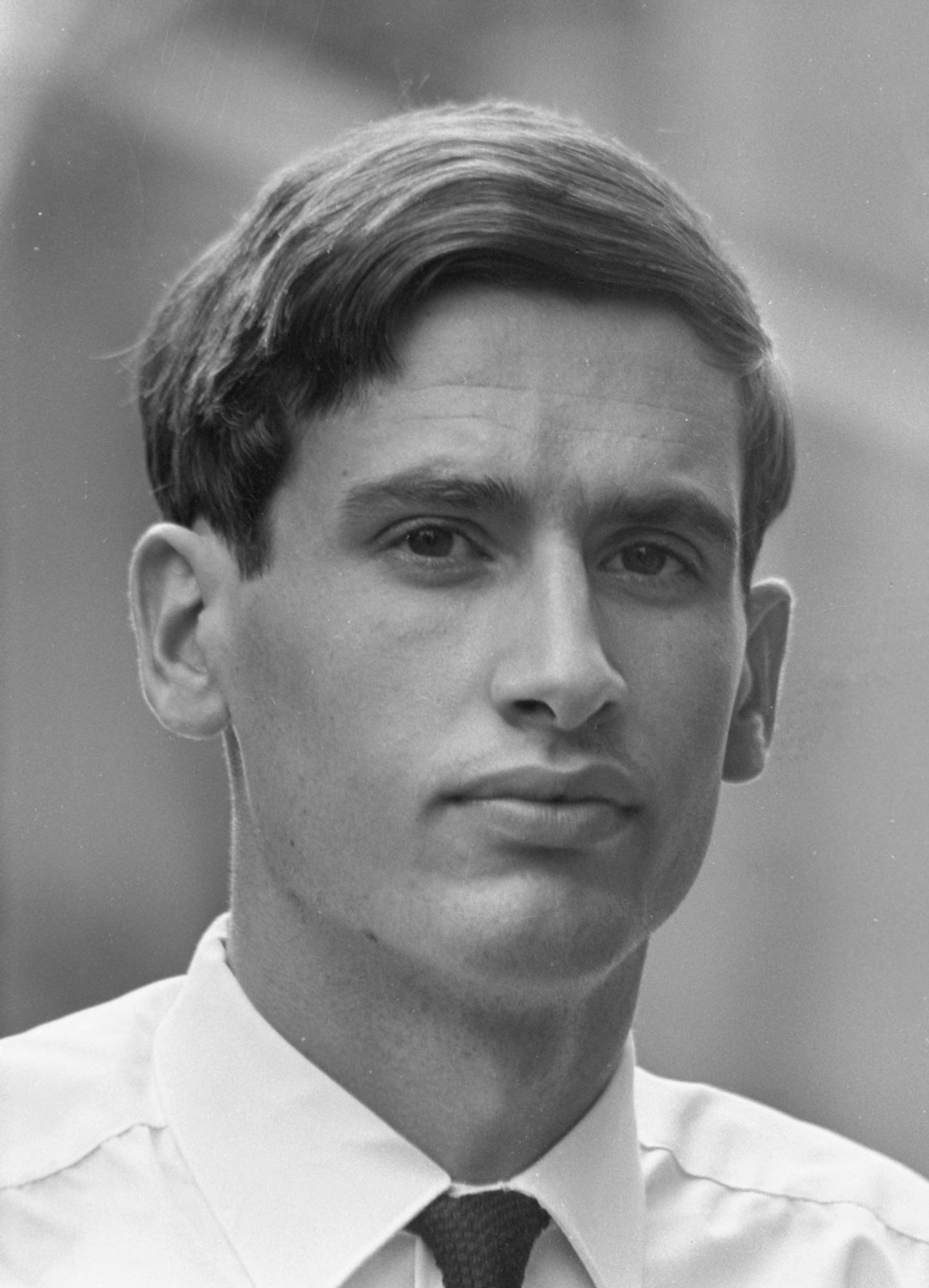
- Ron Kroon in 1968

Medal record

Men's swimming

Representing the Netherlands

European Championships
Bronze medal – third place	1962 Leipzig	4×100 m medley
Bronze medal – third place	1962 Leipzig	100 m freestyle

Ronald Kroon (17 September 1942, Amsterdam – 12 July 2001, Huizen) was a Dutch freestyle swimmer who won two bronze medals at the 1962 European Aquatics Championships. He also competed at the 1960 and 1964 Summer Olympics with the best achievement of 8th place in the 4×100 meters medley relay. Between 1960 and 1964 he was four times national champion and set 12 national records in the 100 m freestyle event. He was the first Dutch athlete to swim 100 meters within 55 seconds.

After his swimming career, Kroon became a photographer with photograph press agency Anefo (1965-1968), and contributing editor at AVRO Sportpanorama in the seventies.

== Some photographs by Ron Kroon ==
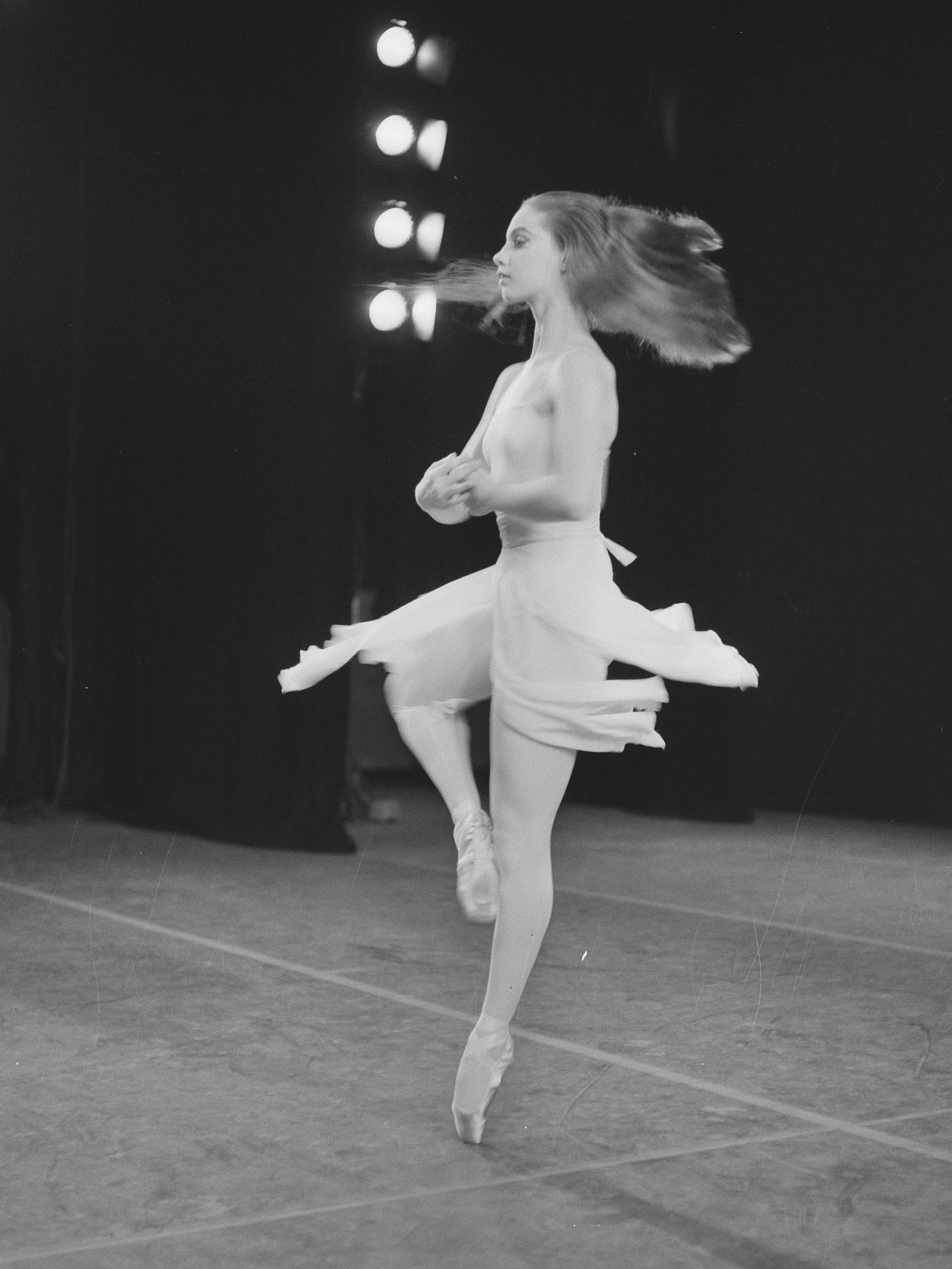
Suzanne Farrell

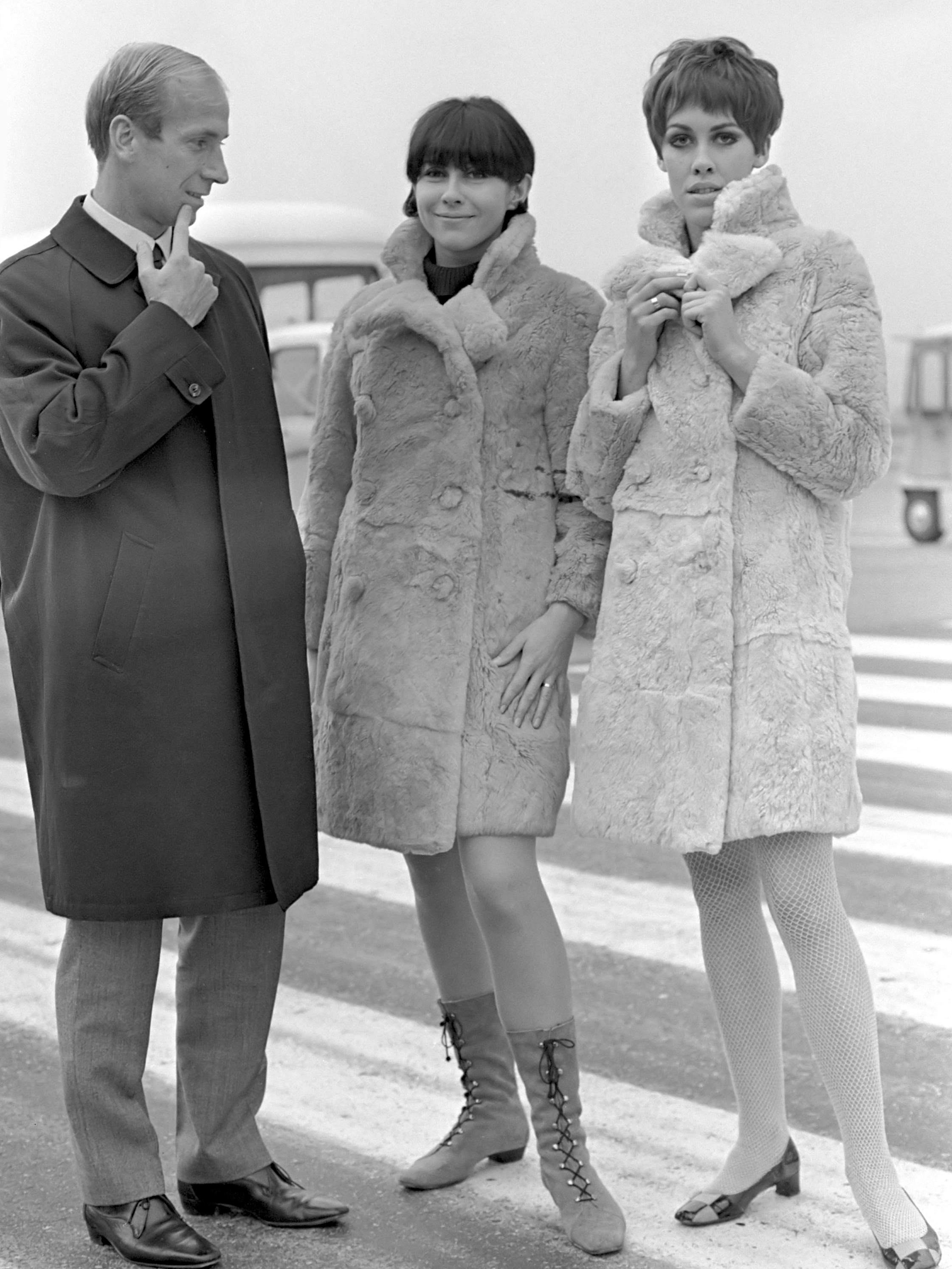
Bobby Charlton

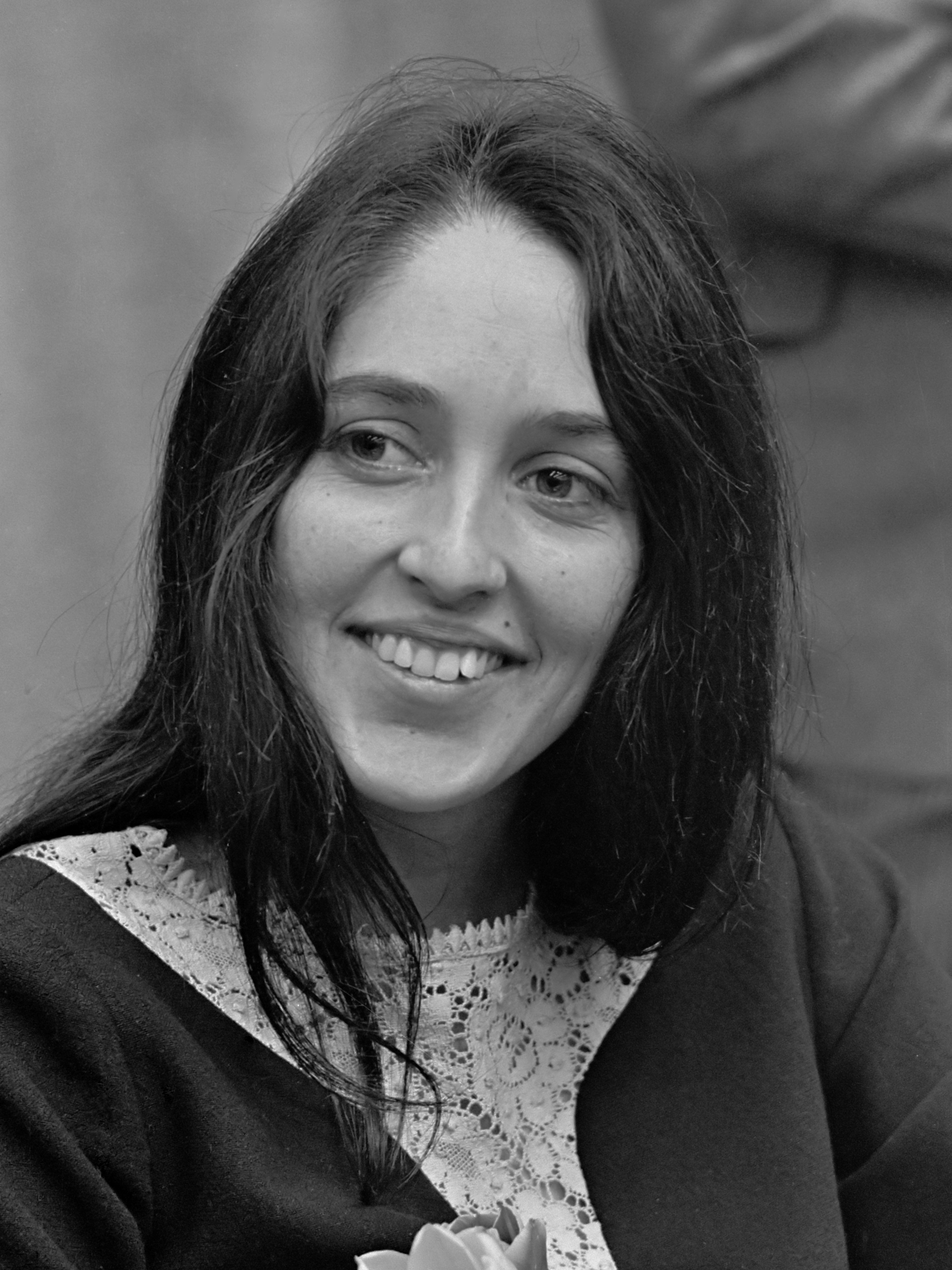
Joan Baez

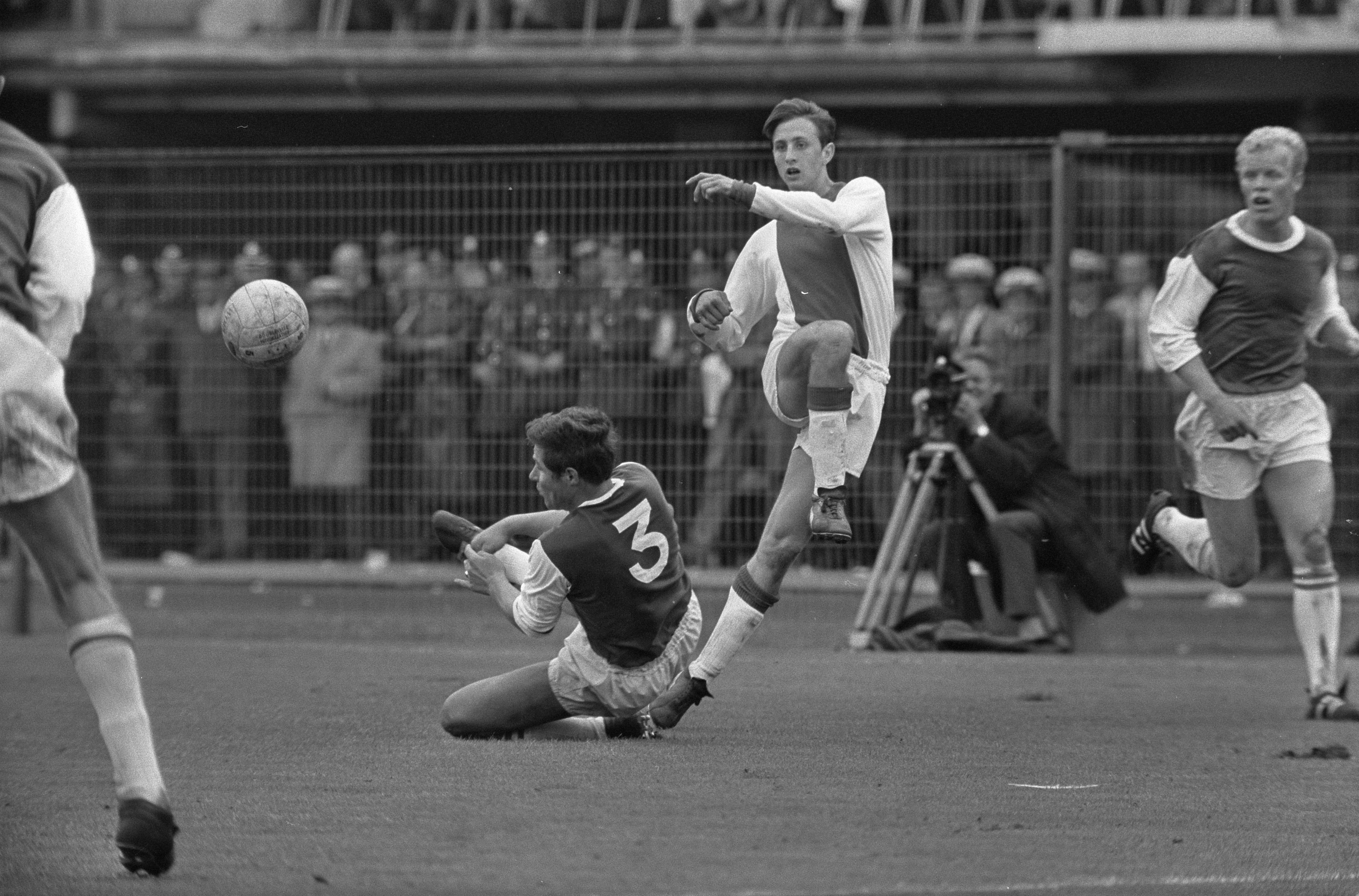
Johan Cruyff
