= Bengt Nordwall =

Swedish swimmer

Personal information
- Full name: Bengt-Olof Nordwall
- Born: 1 June 1941 (age 85) Stockholm, Sweden

Sport
- Sport: Swimming
- Club: SK Neptun

Bengt-Olof Nordwall (born 1 June 1941) is a Swedish former freestyle swimmer. He competed at the 1960 Summer Olympics and the 1964 Summer Olympics.

Nordwall represented SK Neptun.
