= Swimming at the 1964 Summer Olympics – Men's 400 metre freestyle =

Men's 400 metre freestyle at the Games of the XVIII Olympiad
- Venue: Yoyogi National Gymnasium
- Dates: 14–15 October 1964 (heats & final)
- Competitors: 40 from 25 nations
- Winning time: 4:12.2 WR

Medalists
1st place, gold medalist(s)		Don Schollander	United States
2nd place, silver medalist(s)		Frank Wiegand	United Team of Germany
3rd place, bronze medalist(s)		Allan Wood	Australia

The men's 400 metre freestyle event at the 1964 Olympic Games took place between 14 and 15 October. This swimming event used freestyle swimming, which means that the method of the stroke is not regulated (unlike backstroke, breaststroke, and butterfly events). Nearly all swimmers use the front crawl or a variant of that stroke. Because an Olympic size swimming pool is 50 metres long, this race consisted of eight lengths of the pool.

== Results ==
=== Heats ===
Seven heats were held; the fastest eight swimmers advanced to the Finals. Those that advanced are highlighted.

==== Heat One ====
Rank	Athlete	Country	Time
1	Bob Windle	Australia	4:21.6
2	Haruo Yoshimuta	Japan	4:28.8
3	Wolfgang Kremer	Germany	4:29.9
4	Giovanni Orlando	Italy	4:30.8
5	Carlos Canepa	Peru	4:44.9
6	László Szlamka	Hungary	5:00.0

==== Heat Two ====
Rank	Athlete	Country	Time
1	Roy Saari	United States	4:20.0
2	Sandy Gilchrist	Canada	4:24.2
3	Sergio De Gregorio	Italy	4:27.4
4	Aleksandr Paramonov	Soviet Union	4:34.0
5	Julio Arango	Colombia	4:35.1
6	Tin Maung Ni	Myanmar	4:40.9
7	Robert Loh	Hong Kong	4:53.3

==== Heat Three ====
Rank	Athlete	Country	Time
1	John Nelson	United States	4:19.9
2	Johan Bontekoe	Netherlands	4:26.6
3	Yevgeny Novikov	Soviet Union	4:30.0
4	Carlos van der Maath	Argentina	4:30.2
5	Alan Durrett	Northern Rhodesia	4:39.0
6	Aad Oudt	Netherlands	4:46.5

==== Heat Four ====
Rank	Athlete	Country	Time
1	Tsuyoshi Yamanaka	Japan	4:21.1
2	Hans Rosendahl	Sweden	4:23.5
3	Ron Jacks	Canada	4:29.3
4	Pierpaolo Spangaro	Italy	4:30.0
5	Tuomo Hämäläinen	Finland	4:35.5
6	Gert Kölli	Austria	4:38.4
7	Kim Bong-jo	South Korea	4:55.8

==== Heat Five ====
Rank	Athlete	Country	Time
1	Russell Phegan	Australia	4:19.8
2	József Katona	Hungary	4:24.7
3	Takeshi Yamakage	Japan	4:27.8
4	John Thurley	Great Britain	4:31.0
5	Slobodan Dijaković	Yugoslavia	4:41.0
6	Téodoro Capriles	Venezuela	4:44.5
7	Walter Ledgard Jr.	Peru	4:50.4

==== Heat Six ====
Rank	Athlete	Country	Time
1	Frank Wiegand	Germany	4:17.2
2	Semyon Belits-Geiman	Soviet Union	4:19.4
3	Petr Lohnický	Czechoslovakia	4:28.9
4	Celestino Pérez	Puerto Rico	4:30.9
5	Bob Lord	Great Britain	4:33.2
6	Francis Luyce	France	4:33.2
7	Ilkka Suvanto	Finland	4:38.0
8	András Bodnár	Hungary	5:03.7

==== Heat Seven ====
Rank	Athlete	Country	Time
1	Don Schollander	United States	4:15.8
2	Allan Wood	Australia	4:16.2
3	Mats Svensson	Sweden	4:24.6
4	Martin Klink	Germany	4:29.1
5	Ralph Hutton	Canada	4:29.4
6	John Martin-Dye	Great Britain	4:34.3
7	Tan Thuan Heng	Malaysia	4:38.2
8	Pano Capéronis	Switzerland	4:43.8

=== Final ===
Rank	Athlete	Country	Time	Notes
1	Don Schollander	United States	4:12.2	WR
2	Frank Wiegand	United Team of Germany	4:14.9	
3	Allan Wood	Australia	4:15.1	
4	Roy Saari	United States	4:16.7	
5	John Nelson	United States	4:16.9	
6	Tsuyoshi Yamanaka	Japan	4:19.1	
7	Russell Phegan	Australia	4:20.2	
8	Semyon Belits-Geiman	Soviet Union	4:21.4	

Key: WR = World record
