= Swimming at the 1964 Summer Olympics – Men's 4 × 200 metre freestyle relay =

Men's 4 × 200 metre freestyle relay at the Games of the XVIII Olympiad
- Venue: Yoyogi National Gymnasium
- Dates: 17 October 1964 (heats); 18 October 1964 (final)
- Competitors: 67 from 15 nations
- Teams: 15
- Winning time: 7:52.1 WR

Medalists
1st place, gold medalist(s)		Steve Clark, Roy Saari, Gary Ilman, Don Schollander, Bill Mettler*, Dave Lyons*, Mike Wall*, Ed Townsend*	United States
2nd place, silver medalist(s)		Horst-Günther Gregor, Gerhard Hetz, Frank Wiegand, Hans-Joachim Klein	United Team of Germany
3rd place, bronze medalist(s)		Makoto Fukui, Kunihiro Iwasaki, Toshio Shoji, Yukiaki Okabe, Tsuyoshi Yamanaka* *Indicates the swimmer only competed in the preliminary heats.	Japan

The men's 4 × 200 metre freestyle relay event at the 1964 Olympic Games took place 17 — 18 October. The relay featured teams of four swimmers each swimming four lengths of the 50 m pool freestyle.

== Results ==
=== Heats ===
Heat 1

Place	Swimmers	Time	Notes
1	Horst-Günter Gregor, Gerhard Hetz, Frank Wiegand, Hans-Joachim Klein (GER)	8:09.7	
2	Makoto Fukui, Kunihiro Iwasaki, Toshio Shoji, Tsuyoshi Yamanaka (JPN)	8:10.4	
3	Semyon Belits-Geyman, Vladimir Berezin, Aleksandr Paramonov, Yevgeny Novikov (URS)	8:14.5	
4	Sergio De Gregorio, Bruno Bianchi, Giovanni Orlando, Pietro Boscaini (ITA)	8:17.8	
5	Ron Jacks, Ralph Hutton, Daniel Sherry, Sandy Gilchrist (CAN)	8:22.2	
6	Johan Bontekoe, Jan Jiskoot, Ron Kroon, Bert Sitters (NED)	8:27.7	
7	Rafael Hernández, Guillermo Echevarría, Alfredo Guzmán, Salvador Ruíz (MEX)	8:50.3	

Heat 2

Place	Swimmers	Time	Notes
1	Bill Mettler, Dave Lyons, Mike Wall, Ed Townsend (USA)	8:09.0	
2	Mats Svensson, Lester Eriksson, Hans Rosendahl, Jan Lundin (SWE)	8:10.3	
3	Jean-Pascal Curtillet, Pierre Canavèse, Francis Luyce, Alain Gottvallès (FRA)	8:17.0	
4	Peter Doak, John Konrads, John Ryan, David Dickson (AUS)	8:18.3	
5	Ilkka Suvanto, Hannu Vaahtoranta, Tuomo Hämäläinen, Matti Kasvio (FIN)	8:23.3	
6	Gyula Dobay, Csaba Ali, György Kosztolánczy, József Katona (HUN)	8:24.4	
7	John Martin-Dye, John Thurley, Bob Lord, Bobby McGregor (GBR)	8:30.9	
8	Juan Fortuny, Miguel Torres, Antonio Pérez, Antonio Codina (ESP)	8:32.6	

=== Final ===
Place	Swimmers	Time	Notes
1	Steve Clark, Roy Saari, Gary Ilman, Don Schollander (USA)	7:52.1	WR
2	Horst-Günter Gregor, Gerhard Hetz, Frank Wiegand, Hans-Joachim Klein (GER)	7:59.3	
3	Makoto Fukui, Kunihiro Iwasaki, Toshio Shoji, Yukiaki Okabe (JPN)	8:03.8	NR
4	David Dickson, Allan Wood, Peter Doak, Bob Windle (AUS)	8:05.7	
5	Mats Svensson, Lester Eriksson, Hans Rosendahl, Jan Lundin (SWE)	8:08.0	
6	Jean-Pascal Curtillet, Pierre Canavèse, Francis Luyce, Alain Gottvallès (FRA)	8:08.7	
7	Semyon Belits-Geyman, Vladimir Berezin, Aleksandr Paramonov, Yevgeny Novikov (URS)	8:15.1	
8	Sergio De Gregorio, Bruno Bianchi, Giovanni Orlando, Pietro Boscaini (ITA)	8:18.1	
