= Swimming at the 1968 Summer Olympics – Men's 4 × 200 metre freestyle relay =

Men's 4 × 200 metre freestyle relay at the Games of the XIX Olympiad
- Venue: Alberca Olímpica Francisco Márquez
- Dates: 21 October 1968 (heats & final)
- Competitors: 68 from 16 nations
- Winning time: 7:52.3

Medalists
1st place, gold medalist(s)		John Nelson, Stephen Rerych, Mark Spitz, Don Schollander, William Johnson*, David Johnson*, Andy Strenk*, Mike Wall*	United States
2nd place, silver medalist(s)		Greg Rogers, Graham White, Bob Windle, Mike Wenden	Australia
3rd place, bronze medalist(s)		Vladimir Bure, Semyon Belits-Geyman, Georgijs Kuļikovs, Leonid Ilyichov *Swimmers who participated in the heats only. Under 1968 Olympic rules, they did not receive a medal.	Soviet Union

The men's 4 × 200 metre freestyle relay event at the 1968 Olympic Games took place 21 October. The relay featured teams of four swimmers each swimming four lengths of the 50 m pool freestyle.

== Results ==
=== Heats ===
Heat 1

Place	Swimmers	Time	Notes
1	Greg Rogers, Graham White, Bob Windle, Mike Wenden (AUS)	8:04.8	
2	George Smith, Ron Jacks, Sandy Gilchrist, Ralph Hutton (CAN)	8:10.5	
3	Hans Ljungberg, Olle Ferm, Gunnar Larsson, Lester Eriksson (SWE)	8:10.9	
4	John Thurley, Raymond Terrell, Bobby McGregor, Tony Jarvis (GBR)	8:16.3	
5	Tomas Becerra, Federico Sicard, Ricardo González, Julio Arango (COL)	8:26.7	
6	José Ferraioli, Michael Goodner, Gary Goodner, Jorge González (PUR)	8:40.2	

Heat 2

Place	Swimmers	Time	Notes
1	William Johnson, David Johnson, Andy Strenk, Mike Wall (USA)	8:05.1	
2	Michel Rousseau, Gérard Letast, Francis Luyce, Alain Mosconi (FRA)	8:06.3	
3	Hans Faßnacht, Olaf, Baron von Schilling, Folkert Meeuw, Wolfgang Kremer (FRG)	8:07.1	
4	Dick Langerhorst, Johan Schans, Aad Oudt, Elt Drenth (NED)	8:17.0	
5	Roosevelt Abdulgafur, Tony Asamali, Leroy Goff, Luis Ayesa (PHI)	8:41.0	

Heat 3

Place	Swimmers	Time	Notes
1	Vladimir Bure, Semyon Belits-Geyman, Georgijs Kuļikovs, Leonid Ilyichov (URS)	8:07.6	
2	Frank Wiegand, Horst-Günter Gregor, Alfred Müller, Jochen Herbst (GDR)	8:11.2	
3	Kunihiro Iwasaki, Teruhiko Kitani, Noboru Waseda, Satoru Nakano (JPN)	8:14.1	
4	Juan Fortuny, Santiago Esteva, José Antonio Chicoy, Juan Martínez (ESP)	8:23.6	
5	Juan Alanís, Jorge Urreta, Rafaél Cal, Eduardo Alanís (MEX)		DQ

=== Final ===
Place	Swimmers	Time	Notes
1st place, gold medalist(s)	John Nelson, Stephen Rerych, Mark Spitz, Don Schollander (USA)	7:52.3	
2nd place, silver medalist(s)	Greg Rogers, Graham White, Bob Windle, Mike Wenden (AUS)	7:53.7	
3rd place, bronze medalist(s)	Vladimir Bure, Semyon Belits-Geyman, Georgijs Kuļikovs, Leonid Ilyichov (URS)	8:01.6	
4	George Smith, Ron Jacks, Sandy Gilchrist, Ralph Hutton (CAN)	8:03.2	
5	Michel Rousseau, Gérard Letast, Francis Luyce, Alain Mosconi (FRA)	8:03.7	
6	Hans Faßnacht, Olaf von Schilling, Folkert Meeuw, Wolfgang Kremer (FRG)	8:04.3	
7	Frank Wiegand, Horst-Günter Gregor, Alfred Müller, Jochen Herbst (GDR)	8:06.0	
8	Hans Ljungberg, Gunnar Larsson, Olle Ferm, Lester Eriksson (SWE)	8:12.1	
