= David Lyons (swimmer) =

American swimmer (born 1943)

Personal information
- Full name: David Chandler Lyons
- Nickname: "Dave"
- National team: United States
- Born: January 23, 1943 (age 83) Chicago, Illinois, U.S.
- Height: 6 ft 0 in (1.83 m)
- Weight: 154 lb (70 kg)

Sport
- Sport: Swimming
- Strokes: Freestyle
- College team: Yale University
- Coach: Dave Robertson (New Trier High); Phil Moriarty (Yale); James Counsilman (Olympics)
Medal record
Men's swimming
Representing the United States
Pan American Games
Gold medal – first place	1963 São Paulo	4×200 m freestyle

David Chandler "Dave" Lyons (born January 23, 1943) is an American former competition swimmer and Pan American Games gold medalist who competed for Yale University. He swam in the preliminary round for the U.S. relay squad that won a gold medal in the men's 4x200 freestyle relay at the 1964 Tokyo Olympics.

== Early life ==
Lyons was born January 23, 1943 in Chicago, Illinois. He began his competitive swimming career at New Trier High School in Winnetka, Illinois, under Coach Dave Robertson, where he was part of New Trier's national championship team in 1961. One of the most accomplished high school teams of that decade, five New Trier High swimmers held national records. Robertson coached New Trier High between 1946 and 1976. A highly accomplished coach, Robertson's teams at New Trier and later Illinois's Waubonsie Valley High School won fourteen Illinois State titles between 1976 and 1986. Basing his coaching on Roger Bannister's speed in breaking the four-minute mile, Robertson began focusing on interval training, as had Bannister, to make shorter, but more intense practices that would drop his swimmers times.

Lyon's New Trier team later placed third in the 1961 AAU championships. In a signature achievement in 1961, Lyons was the second swimmer to go under 1:50 for the 200-yard freestyle, with Steve Clark of Yale doing it one day earlier. Outstanding swimmers on the New Trier team included Dale Kiefer, a breaststroker, and backstroke specialist Roger Goettsche, who later swam for Yale with Lyons. Butterfly gold medalist Fred Schmidt, who later swam for Indiana University, also swam for Dave Robertson at New Trier High, and was part of the Lyon's New Trier team that won the 1961 Illinois State Championship. While at New Trier, he set a world record in the 100-meter butterfly.

== Yale University ==
Lyons attended Yale University, where he swam for coach Phil Moriarty's Yale Bulldogs swimming and diving team in National Collegiate Athletic Association (NCAA) competition from 1963 to 1965. He won three consecutive NCAA national championships as a member of winning Yale teams in the 400-yard freestyle relay.

In international competition, he earned a gold medal as a member of the first-place U.S. team in the men's 4×200-meter freestyle relay at the 1963 Pan American Games.

== 1964 Tokyo Olympics ==
At the 1964 Summer Olympics in Tokyo, he swam for the gold medal-winning U.S. team in the preliminary heats of the men's 4×200-meter freestyle relay under Head Coach Jim "Doc" Counsilman. The men's team advanced to the finals and won a gold medal. Under the 1964 Olympic rules he was ineligible to receive a medal, however, because he did not swim in the event final. Fellow Yale swimmer, Don Schollander was the highlight of the 1964 U.S. Olympic swimming team, winning four gold medals in individual freestyle and relay events.

Lyons later earned both M.B.A. and M.D. degrees.

He swam for the Florida Gulf Coast Club with United States Masters Swimming, winning a few events during his years of participation.

== See also ==
- List of Yale University people
- World record progression 4 × 200 metres freestyle relay
