= Bill Mettler =

American swimmer (born 1946)

Personal information
- Full name: William Roy Mettler, Jr.
- Nickname: "Bill"
- National team: United States
- Born: October 15, 1946 (age 80) Springfield, Ohio, U.S.
- Education: Yale University (B.A. 1968); U. of Arizona Law School (1973)
- Occupations: Attorney, 1973 Arizona Bar
- Height: 5 ft 11 in (1.80 m)
- Weight: 170 lb (77 kg)

Sport
- Sport: Swimming
- Event: 4x200 freestyle relay
- Strokes: Butterfly; Freestyle
- Club: Dick Smith Swim Gym; Arizona Desert Rats
- College team: Yale University
- Coach: Walt Schlueter (Dick Smith 1961-64); James Counsilman (Olympics); Phil Moriarty (Yale)

William Roy Mettler, Jr. (born October 15, 1946) is an American former competition swimmer and former world record-holder who competed for Yale University. He competed in the 1964 Summer Olympics in the preliminaries of the men's 4×200-meter freestyle relay, where the finals team later won a gold medal.

== Early life ==
William R. Mettler Jr. was born October 15, 1946 to William R. Mettler Senior and wife Jacqueline in Springfield, Ohio, though he grew up in Arizona, and attended Mesa High School in Mesa, Arizona, graduating in 1964. Mettler Jr.'s father worked for many years as a salesman for a wholesale liquor company. Bill Mettler Jr. began swimming around the age of 12, training and competing with the Dick Smith Swim Gym based in the Phoenix area. One of his primary coaches during his High School years was Hall of Fame Coach Walt Schlueter, a Phoenix area coach, who Mettler swam for during High School from around 1961-1964. By 1961-62 Schlueter was one of the Head swimming coaches at the Dick Smith Swim Gym, and also coached the University of Arizona and later the Arizona Desert Rats. Schlueter was a stroke specialist, and helped develop race pace swim training which included short intervals swimming near your fastest times, followed by short rests. Schlueter had also coached the U.S. National team by 1964. By his High School Senior year in 1964, Mettler ranked fourth in the U.S. and eighth globally in his signature event, the 200 meter butterfly. In his peak years, he practiced twice a day, usually six days a week.

By 1964, Mettler held a 100-meter national butterfly age-group record set at the Junior Olympics. Mettler did not swim representing Mesa High School until 1964, the first year the school had a team. At the Southern Arizona Swimming and Diving Championships in June, 1963, representing the Dick Smith Swim Gym which won the team championship, Mettler placed first in the 200-meter butterfly with a time of 2:33.2, and was also on the winning 400-meter medley relay team. By 1966, during Summer breaks from Yale, Mettler represented the Arizona Desert Rats, also coached by Walt Schlueter, placing second in the 110 yard freestyle at the Arizona Senior Swimming Championships.

== 1964 Olympic trials ==
On August 29–September 3, 1964, at New York's Astoria Pool, Mettler swam to a second-place finish with a time of 2:01.4 in the 200-meter freestyle final, qualifying for the U.S. National team, and a spot on the US 1964 Olympic swimming team. In a close finish, Mettler placed second to Ed Townsend of Santa Clara, California who swam a 2:00.9, finishing only a half second ahead of Mettler.

== Relay world record ==
On September 28, 1964, around two weeks prior to the Tokyo Olympics, Mettler was part of a world record set by the U.S. national team in the men's 4×200-meter freestyle relay, set in Los Angeles, California while the U.S. team was training for the Olympics. The team's 4x200 world record freestyle relay time was 8:01.8. Mettler swam the first leg, with the second leg swum by Mike Wall, then Dave Lyons, with Olympic gold medalist Don Schollander as anchor. The record beat the prior world record of 8:03.7 set on August 19, 1963 in Tokyo, by almost two seconds.

== 1964 Tokyo Olympics ==
Mettler represented the United States at the mid-October 1964 Summer Olympics in Tokyo under Head U.S. 1964 Olympic men's swimming Coach James Doc Counsilman. They were the first Olympic games ever hosted by Japan. Mettler swam with the gold medal-winning U.S. team in the qualifying heats of the men's 4×200-meter freestyle relay. Mettler did not receive a medal however, as he was ineligible under the 1964 swimming rules because he did not swim in the event final. The U.S. team set a new World Record for the event of 7:52.1 in the final heat, with the Unified Team from Germany taking the silver with a time of 7:59.3, and the team from Japan taking the bronze with a time of 8:03.8.

=== Yale University ===
Mettler attended Yale University, where he swam for coach Phil Moriarty's Yale Bulldogs swimming and diving team in National Collegiate Athletic Association (NCAA) and Ivy League competition from 1964 to 1968. While at Yale, he was a five time All American. As a Freshman, Mettler held the Freshman butterfly record for the 200-yard event at 2:01.7. The Yale team had exceptional depth in the 200 freestyle event, with as many as eleven of their swim team members able to complete the 200-yard freestyle swim in a time below 1:49.0, including Olympian Don Schollander who had been clocked at under 1:45.0. A strong program, the Yale team had just under 70 varsity swimmers when Mettler was a Freshman, despite the fact that most of them would not get the opportunity to compete in a regular season dual meet. By Mettler's Sophomore season, the Yale team had won around 38 successive dual meets.

Continuing to swim after his elite career ended, Mettler trained and competed with United States Masters Swimming's Phoenix Swim Club at least through 1977. In Masters competition, he swam a :28 seconds in the 50 meter Butterfly, receiving a National first place age-group time in 1973, and received a national second place age-group time in the 50 meter freestyle with a time of 22.10 in 1977.

=== Careers ===
Mettler returned to Arizona after the Olympics. He attended the University of Arizona Law School, graduating with a J.D. in 1973, and in 1973 passed the Arizona Bar. He worked as an attorney in greater Phoenix for over four decades, specializing in Litigation with experience in commercial litigation, personal injury defense cases, and plaintiff's personal injury. In his more recent career, he has lived in the Phoenix suburb of Scottsdale.

== See also ==
- List of Yale University people
- World record progression 4 × 200 metres freestyle relay
