= Paramonov =

Paramonov (Russian: Парамонов) is a Russian masculine surname, its feminine counterpart is Paramonova. It may refer to

- Aleksandr Paramonov (born 1942), Soviet swimmer
- Aleksei Paramonov (1925–2018), Soviet football player and manager
- Konstantin Paramonov (born 1973), Russian football coach and former player
- Sergey Paramonov (born 1945), Soviet fencer
- Sergey Jacques Paramonov (1894–1967) Russian-Australian entomologist
- Vadym Paramonov (born 1991), Ukrainian football player
