= Philip Long =

American swimmer (1948–2026)

Personal information
- Full name: Philip Edward Long
- Nickname: "Phil"
- National team: United States
- Born: December 6, 1948 Washington, D.C., U.S.
- Died: January 9, 2026 (aged 77)
- Height: 5 ft 9 in (1.75 m)
- Weight: 161 lb (73 kg)

Sport
- Sport: Swimming
- Strokes: Breaststroke
- Club: Suburban Seahawks Club
- College team: Yale University
- Coach: Frank Keefe; Suburban; Phil Moriarty; Yale

Philip Edward Long (December 6, 1948 – January 9, 2026) was an American competition swimmer.

== Early swimming ==
In his youth, Long worked out with Philadelphia's Suburban Swim Club, an outstanding program started by Hall of Fame Coach Peter Daland around 1950, and after 1966 was under ASCA Hall of Fame Coach Frank Keefe, who coached Long during several of his years with the club. At the age of 12 in February 1961, while swimming for Suburban Swim Club, he competed in the 50-yard breaststroke at the AAU Age Group championship in York, Pennsylvania. Diverse in his stroke skills, by 1963 while swimming for the Suburban Club, he had distinguished himself in the individual medley, and competed in the AAU Tournament of Champions in York, Pennsylvania where he set a meet record of 1:06.9 for the 100 breaststroke in the Boys' 13-14 age group category.

== 1968 Mexico Olympics ==
After placing third in the Olympic trials in the 200-meter breaststroke, Long represented the United States in the event at the 1968 Summer Olympics in Mexico City. He did quite well in the Olympic preliminaries swimming a 2:33.1 for the men's 200-meter breaststroke to qualify for the final of the event, where he finished in seventh place with a time of 2:33.6, not quite able to match his preliminary time. His time placed him a little less than four seconds out of medal contention with American bronze medalist Brian Job. The gold medal winner, Felipe Munoz, represented Mexico in an Olympics where the Mexican Olympic team fared well, as they may have had an advantage swimming in their home country, being able to practice more frequently at altitude.

He attended Yale University, and swam for coach Phil Moriarty's Yale Bulldogs swimming and diving team in National Collegiate Athletic Association (NCAA) competition from 1967 to 1970, swimming as a Freshman in 1967. Showing skills in the breaststroke in his first year swimming for Yale, he set an NCAA Freshman record of 2:12.8 in the 200-yard breaststroke. In one of his first years swimming for Yale, at the National AAU Swimming Championships in Greenville, North Carolina, in mid-April, 1968, Long placed third in the 100-yard breaststroke, with a time of 59:39. He won the NCAA national championship in the 200-yard breaststroke in 1968.

He graduated from Yale with a bachelor's degree in psychology in 1970, and worked in Yale's information technology services starting in 1971. He held the formal title of Director of Academic Computing in January 1999, and served as Director of Yale's Information Technology Services from 2001 to 2010.

== Death ==
Long died on January 9, 2026, at the age of 77.

== See also ==
- List of Yale University people
