= Yukiaki Okabe =

Japanese swimmer (1941–2018)

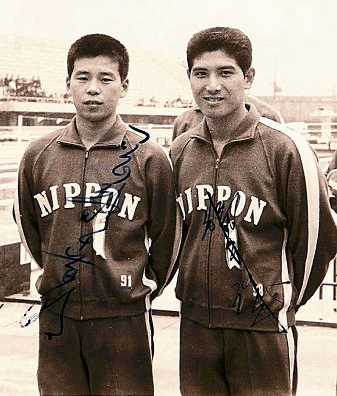
- Yukiaki Okabe (left) in 1964

Personal information
- Born: April 24, 1941
- Died: January 26, 2018 (aged 76) Tokyo, Japan
- Height: 1.67 m (5 ft 6 in)
- Weight: 65 kg (143 lb)

Sport
- Sport: Swimming
Medal record
Representing Japan
Olympic Games
Bronze medal – third place	1964 Tokyo	4×200 m freestyle

Yukiaki Okabe (岡部 幸明, Okabe Yukiaki; April 24, 1941 – January 26, 2018) was a Japanese freestyle swimmer. He was part of the Japanese teams that set a world record in 1963 and won an Olympic bronze medal in 1964 in the 4 × 200 m freestyle relay. In 1964 he also finished fourth in the 4 × 100 m freestyle relay and fifth in the 4 × 100 m medley relay.

Okabe died of pneumonia in Tokyo on January 26, 2018, at the age of 76.
