= Frank Keefe (swim coach) =

American competitive swimmer and coach

Frank P. Keefe, Sr.

Biographical details
- Born: September 8, 1937; New Haven, Connecticut, U.S.
- Died: May 4, 2023 (aged 85); Philadelphia, Pennsylvania, U.S.
- Education: Villanova University

Playing career
- 1956–1960: Villanova
- Positions: backstroke, medley, freestyle

Coaching career (HC unless noted)
- 1960–1965: Philadel. Country Club; Monsignor Bonner High; Saint Joseph's Prep; Saint Joseph's University
- 1966–1976: Suburban Swim Club; Philadelphia
- 1976–1978: Foxcatcher Swim Club; Newton Square, PA
- 1978–2010: Yale University, Men's Team; Omni Swim Club
- 1980–2010: Yale University, Women's Team
- '84, '88, '00: U.S. Olympic Swim Team
- 1975, 1979: Pan American Games

Head coaching record
- Overall: 485 wins in dual meets (Yale)

Accomplishments and honors

Championships
- 69–76 Eastern USA Champs (Suburban Swim Club); 77–78 Eastern USA Champs (Suburban Swim Club); 91–92 Ivy League Men's Championship; 5 Ivy League Women's Championships (Yale)

Awards
- Ivy League Women's Championship Trophy named the Frank Keefe Trophy; 2009 ASCA Award of Excellence; 2022 USA Swimming Award

Frank Keefe was an American competitive swimmer for Villanova and a Hall of Fame Olympic, College, and club swimming coach, who served as the head coach for Yale University Men's and Women's swim teams from 1978 to 2010. At Yale, his teams captured two Men's and five Women's Ivy League Championships. He was formerly the Head Coach of the renowned Suburban and Foxcatcher Swim Clubs in Philadelphia from 1966 to 1978, where he led his teams to consecutive Eastern USA Championships.

== Early education and swimming ==
Keefe was born on September 8, 1938, to Frank and Grace Keefe and grew up in New Haven, Connecticut where his father worked for Yale's Physical Education Department. He attended Pennsylvania's Mercersburg Academy, and swam for Villanova University, graduating in 1960.

Swimming for Villanova at a dual meet in February 1959, Keefe helped set a record of 4:10.4 swimming the first leg of a 440 Medley relay, and swam a pool record of 2:22.2 for his specialty, the 220 backstroke. Keefe frequently swam with Villanova's 400 Medley Relay team, which usually took first place in Dual Meets. He also swam the 200 individual medley and 100 freestyle, and served as Villanova Captain in 1959–1960.

== Coaching ==
In 1960 immediately after graduating from Villanova, he began work for the Phoenix Mutual Insurance Company in sales through 1961, while beginning work at Monsignor Bonner High School as a teacher for English literature, business law, and as a swim coach from 1960 to 1965. Remaining in the Philadelphia area in his early coaching career, he coached at St. Joseph's Prep and St. Joseph's University.

In 1966, he took over as coach of Philadelphia's Suburban Swim Club where he would train numerous Olympians. The club had an outstanding history and had been founded by Hall of Fame swim coach Peter Daland around 1950 by combining several existing swim clubs. The Suburban Swim Club team were the Eastern USA Champs from 1969 to 1976, and finished in the Top 10 in the National AAU Championships from 1968 to 1976.

Around 1976, he persuaded John Dupont to let him manage, coach, and own the new Foxcatcher Swim Club at the recently completed 50-meter pool at Dupont's Foxcatcher Farm athletic center. He remained with the Foxcatcher program from 1976 to 1978. Returning to the place of his birth, he accepted an offer to coach the Yale University Men's Swimming team, beginning in September 1980. By the time he accepted the position at Yale, he had already mentored nine Olympic swimmers. In July 1980, with extra time due to America having boycotted the Moscow Olympics, Keefe worked as a swim coach at a six-week summer swim camp at Ocean Beach in New London, Connecticut along with Princeton swim coach Rob Orr. That year, Keefe was appointed Yale's first Director of swimming, in addition to his coaching responsibilities.

He continued to coach the Yale Men's team through 2010 leading them to the Ivy League Championship in 1997–98. He also served as head coach of the Women's team from 1980 to 2010, impressively leading them to five Ivy League Championships. While at Yale, he founded and coached the Omni Swim Club in New Haven, Connecticut.

== International coaching ==
He worked with the U.S. teams at the 1975 and 1979 Pan American Games and the 1978 World Championships. After helping the coach of the U.S. team at the 1984 Los Angeles Olympics, he then went on to Manage the 1988 Olympics in Seoul. He also coached the U.S. team at the 1978 World Aquatics Championships.

== Outstanding swimmers ==
A complete list of Keefe's top swimmers would be very lengthy. To summarize, Keefe mentored 1968 Olympic Gold medalist Carl Robie, and 1972–1976 Silver medalist Tim McKee, as well as 1968 Olympic Backstroke finalist Philip Long, and 1976 Olympic finalist Brenda Borgh. He worked with 1971 World Champion finalist Julie Woodcock, and Gregory Jagenburg, a 1975 World Aquatic Champion in Butterfly. He also coached NCAA All Americans Lisa O'Dell, Jason Rosenbaum, Missy Dallyrimple, Suzanne Heiser and George Gleason.

== Swimming community roles ==
After his retirement from coaching Yale in 2010, he returned to the Philadelphia area and remained active in the Pennsylvania swimming community. He volunteered as an assistant coach at his alma mater Villanova, Swarthmore College, La Salle University and the Shipley School. Keefe worked for the American Swimming Coaches Association as vice president from 1976 to 1978, before serving as president from 1978 to 1980. In the 1970s Keefe help start USA Swimming, making it a separate entity from the AAU so the organization could control the sanctioning of US swimming events. From 1974–79 Keefe Chaired National Times Standards for the AAU. In an important role for fifteen years from 1973–88, Keefe was part of the Olympic International Organizing Committee.

== Honors ==
Keefe was inducted into the Villanova Athletic Hall of Fame, the Pennsylvania Aquatics Hall of Fame and the American Swim Coaches Association Hall of Fame, in 2005. The Ivy League Women's Championship Trophy is named the Frank Keefe Trophy in his honor. He received both the 2009 ASCA Award of Excellence and the 2022 USA Swimming Award, considered to be one of the highest awards in swimming. Keefe was twice the Eastern Intercollegiate Swimming League Coach of the Year.

== Death ==
Keefe last resided in Downington, Pennsylvania, not far from Newton Square where he coached the Foxcatcher Swim Club. He died on May 4, 2023, in the Philadelphia area. He was married to Kathleen M. Lawless Keefe and was father to four children, Kelly Anne, Frank Keefe Jr., Luke and Sean Keefe.
