= Yale Bulldogs swimming and diving =

Swimming and diving teams at Yale University

- Founded: 1898; 128 years ago
- University: Yale University
- Head coach: Jim Henry
- Conference: Ivy League
- Location: New Haven, Connecticut, US
- Home pool: Robert J. H. Kiphuth Exhibition Pool
- Nickname: Bulldogs, Elis

Men's NCAA Champions
- 4 (1942, 1944, 1951, 1953)

Women's NCAA Champions
- 0

Men's Conference Champions
- 30

Women's Conference Champions
- 6

Since its inception in 1898, the Yale Bulldogs swimming and diving program has produced numerous champion athletes. Many Yale swimmers have gone on to earn All-American honors and even break world records. The team has won 4 NCAA championships, 30 EISL championships, and several AAU championships. Under legendary coach Robert J. H. Kiphuth, the Yale men swam to a record of 528 wins and 12 losses. As of February 2009, the men's program has a record of 1063 wins and 210 losses over 112 years. The first varsity women's team competed in 1975.

== History ==
Yale Swimming "Flying Y" Logo

=== Coaches ===
- Thomas O'Callahan (1906–1915) 47-14
- Matthew Mann (1915–1917) 17-3
- Robert J. H. Kiphuth (1917–1959) 528-12
- Phil Moriarty (1959–1976) 195-25
- Edward L. Bettendorf (1976–1977) 8-3
- Paul Katz (1977–1978) 3-7
- Frank P. Keefe (1978–2010) 241-127 (men)
- Timothy Wise (2010–2017) (men)
- Jim Henry (2013–present) 28 - 7 (women, combined 2017-present)

=== Captains and season records ===
==== Men ====
1. 1898-1899 ? 1-2
2. 1899-1900 ? 1-1
3. 1900-1901 ? 1-0
4. 1901-1902 ? 5-3
5. 1902-1903 ? 2-3
6. 1903-1904 ? 2-1
7. 1904-1905 ? 4-1
8. 1905-1906 ? 3-2
9. 1906-1907 ? 2-3
10. 1907-1908 ? 3-2
11. 1908-1909 Edward C. M. Richards 4-2
12. 1909-1910 Edward C. M. Richards 7-0
13. 1910-1911 William Howe 5-0
14. 1911-1912 John Cameron Stoddart 3-2
15. 1912-1913 Andrew Wilson 8-2
16. 1913-1914 Paul Roberts 7-1
17. 1914-1915 Daniel Summers 8-2
18. 1915-1916 Carl V. Schlaet 7-2
19. 1916-1917 Louis A. Ferguson 10-1
20. 1917-1918 Richard Mayer 8-1
21. 1918-1919 John M. Hincks 7-0
22. 1919-1920 John M. Hincks 10-0
23. 1920-1921 Lorrin P. Thurston 14-0
24. 1921-1922 C. Dudley Pratt 14-0
25. 1922-1923 William L. Jelliffe 15-0
26. 1923-1924 Robert B. Colgate 10-4
27. 1924-1925 Robert J. Sullivan 14-0
28. 1925-1926 James D. Bronson 14-0
29. 1926-1927 Phil W. Bunnell 14-0
30. 1927-1928 James A. House Jr. 14-0
31. 1928-1929 John A. Pope 12-0
32. 1929-1930 John V. Howland 14-0
33. 1930-1931 Robert L. Messimer 14-0
34. 1931-1932 Lloyd B. Osborne 11-0
35. 1932-1933 Albert T. Hapke 14-0
36. 1933-1934 Joseph Barker 14-0
37. 1934-1935 David Livingston 12-0
38. 1935-1936 Norris D. Hoyt 14-0
39. 1936-1937 Richard A. Cooke 14-1
40. 1937-1938 John Macionis 10-3
41. 1938-1939 John W. Good 15-1
42. 1939-1940 Russ P. Duncan 15-1
43. 1940-1941 Willis H. Sanburn III 13-0
44. 1941-1942 Howard R. Johnson 12-0
45. 1942-1943 L.D. Dannenbaum 13-0
46. 1943-1944 Richard Lyon 10-0
47. 1944-1945 Alan R. Ford 8-1
48. 1945-1946 Philetus Stetler 8-0
49. 1946-1947 Edward K. Heuber 13-0
50. 1947-1948 Allan M. Stack 12-0
51. 1948-1949 Richard B. Baribault 13-0
52. 1949-1950 Albert J. Ratkiewicz 13-0
53. 1950-1951 Raymond M. Reid 13-0
54. 1951-1952 James J. Carroll 13-0
55. 1952-1953 Wayne R. Moor 14-0
56. 1953-1954 Kenneth S. Welch 13-0
57. 1954-1955 Malcolm P. Aldrich Jr. 14-0
58. 1955-1956 John P. Phair 15-0
59. 1956-1957 William T. Clinton 14-0
60. 1957-1958 Peter R. Taft 13-0
61. 1958-1959 P. Timothy Jecko 13-0
62. 1959-1960 Peter Lusk 14-0
63. 1960-1961 Thomas Bissell 12-1
64. 1961-1962 William McMaster 12-1
65. 1962-1963 John Finch 13-0
66. 1963-1964 Michael M. Austin 13-0
67. 1964-1965 Stephen E. Clark 13-0
68. 1965-1966 George S. Hill 12-1
69. 1966-1967 Douglas Kennedy 14-0
70. 1967-1968 Donald A. Schollander 14-0
71. 1968-1969 Robert S. Waples Jr. 15-0
72. 1969-1970 Edward L. Bettendorf 14-0
73. 1970-1971 Michael W. Cadden 12-1
74. 1971-1972 Robert Kasting 10-3
75. 1972-1973 Nate Cartmell 10-1
76. 1973-1974 Chuck Holum 6-5
77. 1974-1975 Bryan Smith 4-6
78. 1975-1976 Bob Blattner 7-6
79. 1976-1977 Quentin Lawler 8-3
80. 1977-1978 Bill Lindsay 3-7
81. 1978-1979 Jim Healy 5-6
82. 1979-1980 Mark DeVore 5-6
83. 1980-1981 Kurt Langborg 5-6
84. 1981-1982 Bob Murchison 7-5
85. 1982-1983 Jon Sharp 6-6
86. 1983-1984 Geoff Pitt 3-8
87. 1984-1985 Jason Green 7-5
88. 1985-1986 Todd Kaplan 3-7
89. 1986-1987 Bert Hazlett 7-4
90. 1987-1988 Jeff Kaplan 3-7
91. 1988-1989 Eric Breissinger 5-7
92. 1989-1990 Dave Jacobs 7-4
93. 1990-1991 Greg Reihman 10-3
94. 1991-1992 Greg Reihman 9-1
95. 1992-1993 Mike Englesbe 13-1
96. 1993-1994 Sean Tesoro 10-2
97. 1994-1995 Mike Kostal 11-5
98. 1995-1996 John Mendell 7-7
99. 1996-1997 Brian Hall 9-3
100. 1997-1998 David Antonelli 7-4
101. 1998-1999 Steve Gold 10-1
102. 1999-2000 Mike Caperonis 10-2
103. 2000-2001 George Gleason 10-3
104. 2001-2002 Pat Dennis 14-1
105. 2002-2003 Greg Palumbo 11-2
106. 2003-2004 Alex Nash 10-2
107. 2004-2005 Dave Lange 7-5
108. 2005-2006 Brendan Everman 8-4
109. 2006-2007 Geof Zann 7-3
110. 2007-2008 Colin Stalnecker 8-3
111. 2008-2009 Alex Righi 7-4
112. 2009-2010 Thomas Robinson 5-6
113. 2010-2011 Kyle Veatch 2-8
114. 2011-2012 Christopher Luu 6-2
115. 2012-2013 Jared Lovett 8-2
116. 2013-2014 Ed Becker 7-3
117. 2014-2015 Andrew Heymann 8-2
118. 2015-2016 Brian Hogan 8-3
119. 2016-2017 Alex Goss 10-2
120. 2017-2018 Dirk Bell 6-2
121. 2018-2019 Adrian Lin 4-4
122. 2019-2020 Matthew Slabe 6-3
123. 2020-2021 Patrick Frith Season Canceled
124. 2021-2022 Nathan Stern 4-4
125. 2022-2023 Joseph Page 6-3
126. 2023-2024 Sungmin Kang 4-5
127. 2024-2025 Alex Deng 7-1
128. 2025-2026 Alex Hazlett

=== NCAA Championships ===
- 1942
- 1944
- 1951
- 1953

=== Men's EISL Championships ===
Yale is in the Ivy League, but men's swimming traditionally competes in the Eastern Intercollegiate Swim League (EISL), which pre-dates the Ivy League by 18 years. The EISL currently includes all the Ivy League schools.

- 1936
- 1939
- 1940
- 1941
- 1942
- 1943
- 1946
- 1947
- 1948
- 1949
- 1950
- 1951
- 1952
- 1953
- 1954
- 1955
- 1956
- 1957
- 1958
- 1959
- 1960
- 1961
- 1963
- 1964
- 1965
- 1967
- 1968
- 1969
- 1970
- 1973

=== Women's Ivy Championships ===
- 1978
- 1992
- 1993
- 1996
- 1997
- 2017

=== Olympians ===
==== Athletes ====
- 1912, Stockholm
  - Arthur McAleenan, diving
- 1936, Berlin
  - John Macionis, 400 Freestyle, 4x200 Freestyle Relay silver
- 1948, London
  - Alan Ford, 100 Freestyle silver
  - James McLane, 400 Freestyle silver, 1500 Freestyle gold, 4x200 Freestyle Relay Gold
  - John Marshall (Australia), 400 Freestyle bronze, 1500 Freestyle silver
  - Allen Stack, 100 Backstroke gold
- 1952, Helsinki
  - Rex Aubrey (Australia), 100 Freestyle, 1500 Freestyle, 4x200 Freestyle Relay
  - James McLane, 4x200 Freestyle Relay gold, 400 Freestyle, 1500 Freestyle
  - John Marshall (Australia), 400 Freestyle, 4x200 Freestyle Relay
  - Wayne Moore, 4x200 Freestyle Relay gold, 400 Freestyle
  - Donald Sheff, alternate 4x200 Freestyle Relay
  - Allen Stack, 100 Backstroke
- 1956, Melbourne
  - Timothy Jecko, alternate 4x200 Freestyle Relay
  - John Marshall (Australia), 200 Butterfly
- 1960, Rome
  - Stephen Clark, alternate 4x100 Medley Relay, 4x200 Freestyle Relay
  - Jeffrey Farrell, 4x100 Medley Relay gold, 4x200 Freestyle Relay gold
- 1964, Tokyo
  - Michael Austin, 4x100 Freestyle Relay gold, 100 Freestyle
  - Stephen Clark, 4x100 Medley Relay gold, 4x100 Freestyle Relay gold, 4x200 Freestyle Relay gold
  - David Lyons, alternate 4x100 Freestyle Relay, 4x200 Freestyle Relay
  - William Mettler, alternate 4x200 Freestyle Relay
  - John Nelson, 1500 Freestyle silver, 400 Freestyle
  - Donald Schollander, 100 Freestyle gold, 400 Freestyle gold, 4x100 Freestyle Relay gold, 4x200 Freestyle Relay gold
  - Edward Townsend, alternate 4x100 Freestyle Relay, 4x200 Freestyle Relay
- 1968, Mexico City
  - David Johnson, alternate 4x100 Freestyle Relay, alternate 4x200 Freestyle Relay
  - Philip Long, 200 Breaststroke
  - John Nelson, 4x200 Freestyle Relay gold, 200 Freestyle bronze, 400 Freestyle, 1500 Freestyle
  - Donald Schollander, 4x200 Freestyle Relay gold, 200 Freestyle silver, alternate 400 Medley Relay, 4x100 Freestyle Relay
- 1972, Munich
  - Erik Fish (Canada), 4x100 Medley Relay bronze
  - Robert Kasting (Canada), 4x100 Medley Relay bronze
- 1976, Montreal
  - Lionel Bourcelot (France), 100 Backstroke
- 1984, Los Angeles
  - George Gross (Canada), Water Polo
- 2000, Sydney
  - Stephen Fahy (Bermuda), 100 Butterfly, 200 Individual Medley
  - George Gleason (U.S. Virgin Islands), 100 Freestyle, 200 Freestyle, 200 Individual Medley
  - Emily de Riel, Modern Pentathlon silver
- 2004, Athens
  - George Gleason (U.S. Virgin Islands), 100 Freestyle
- 2004, Athens (Paralympics)
  - Deb Gruen, 100 Breaststroke bronze, 100 Freestyle, 200 Individual Medley, 400 Freestyle, 50 Butterfly
- 2008, Beijing (Paralympics)
  - Deb Gruen, 400 Freestyle, 50 Butterfly, 100 Breaststroke (American Record) bronze, 200 Individual Medley
- 2024, Paris (Paralympics)
  - Ali Truwit, 400 Freestyle silver, 100 Backstroke silver

==== Coaches ====
- Robert J. H. Kiphuth: 1928, 1932, 1936, 1940, 1948
- Philip Moriarty: 1960
- Frank Keefe: 1984, 1988, 2000

=== Pan American Games Champions ===
- Eva Fabian
- Jim McLane

=== Alumni ===
- Ogden Mills Reid '07, Law '09; "Yale's first great swimmer" and later financial supporter and occasional coach.
- Robert Moses '09; future New York power broker resigned from the swim team as an undergraduate, in a dispute over fundraising.

== Facilities ==
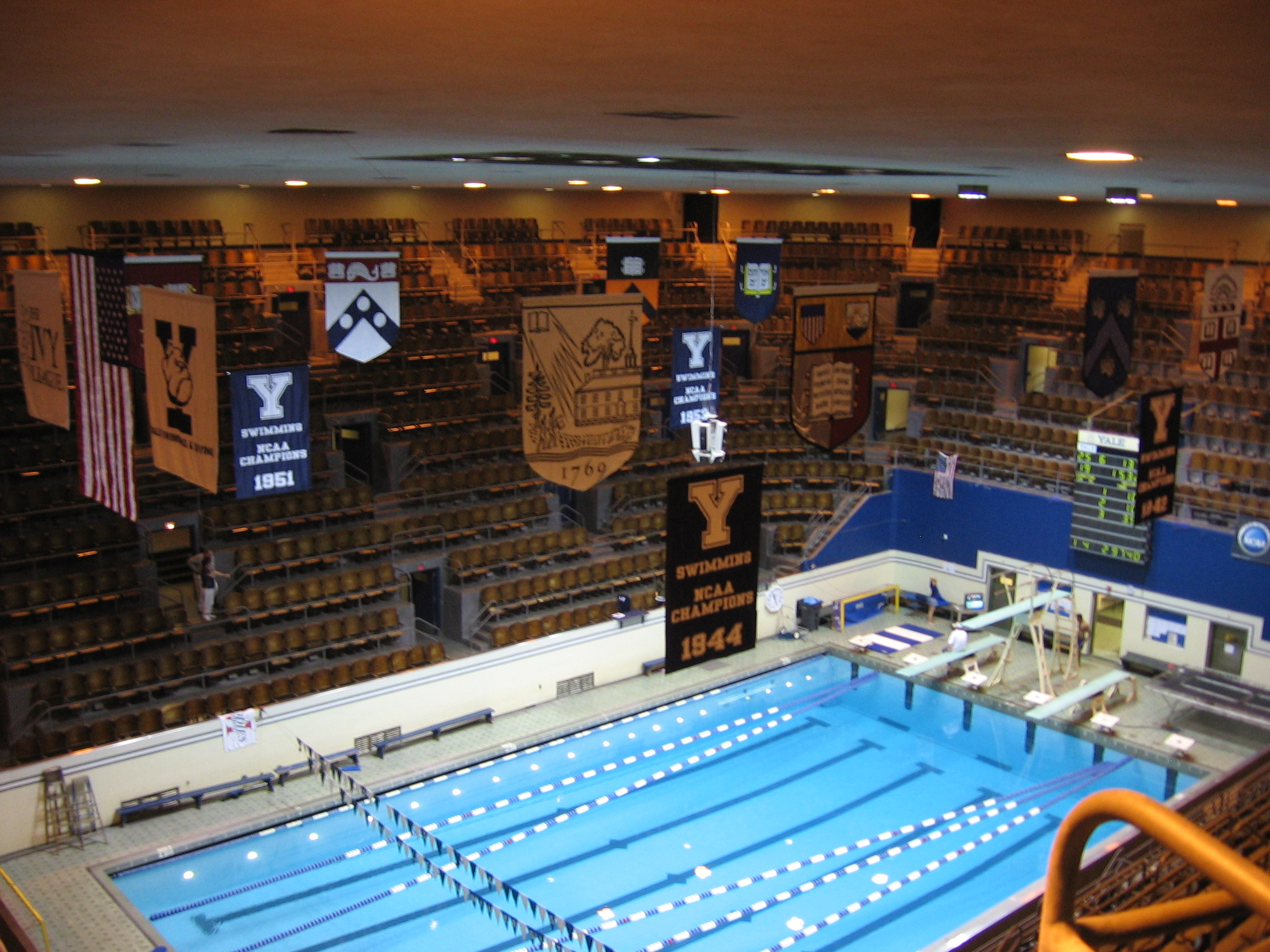
The Robert J. H. Kiphuth Exhibition Pool, Yale University

The Yale Swimming & Diving teams train and compete in the Payne Whitney Gymnasium on Yale's campus. The third-floor practice pool is a 5-lane, 50-meter course with two moveable bulkheads that allow the pool to be divided into two 25-yard courses. The Robert J. H. Kiphuth Exhibition Pool is the competition venue, and is a 6-lane 25-yard course with seating for 2,178.
