= Michael Wall (swimmer) =

American swimmer

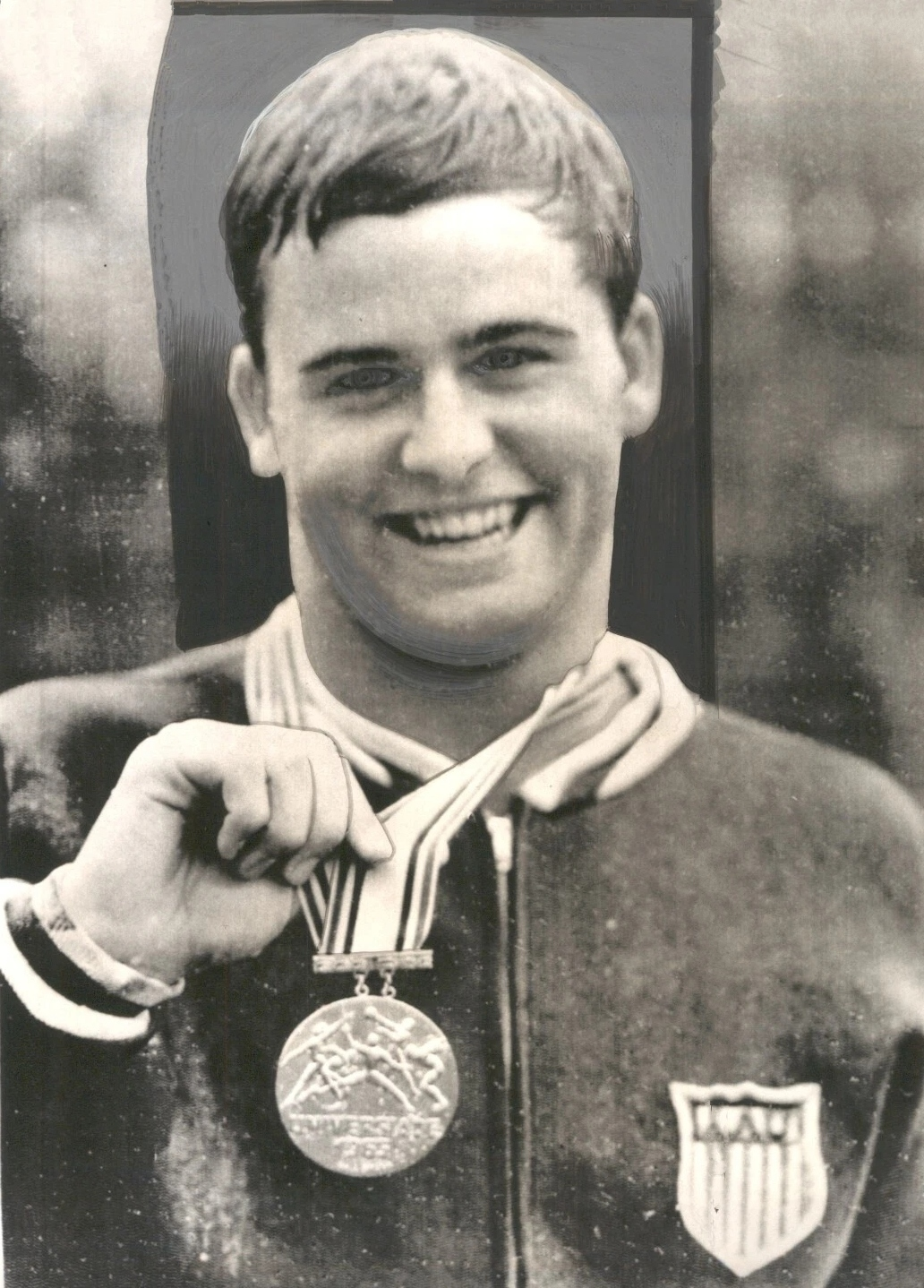
- Wall in 1965

Personal information
- Full name: Michael Allen Wall
- Nickname: "Mike"
- National team: United States
- Born: February 1, 1946 (age 80) Atlanta, Georgia, U.S.
- Height: 6 ft 2 in (1.88 m)
- Weight: 170 lb (77 kg)

Sport
- Sport: Swimming
- Strokes: Freestyle
- Club: Santa Clara Swim Club
- College team: Stanford University

Michael Allen Wall (born February 1, 1946) is an American former competition swimmer who participated in two consecutive Summer Olympics.

At the 1964 Summer Olympics in Tokyo, Wall competed for the gold medal-winning U.S. team in the preliminary heats of the men's 4×200-meter freestyle relay. Four years later at the 1968 Summer Olympics in Mexico City, he swam for the first-place U.S. teams in the qualifying heats of the men's 4×100-meter freestyle relay and men's 4×200-meter freestyle relay. He did not, however, receive a medal for either performance; until 1984, under international swimming rules, relay swimmers were not eligible for a medal unless they swam in the event finals.

Wall attended Stanford University, where he swam for the Stanford Cardinal swimming and diving team in National Collegiate Athletic Association (NCAA) competition. Wall was a member of Stanford's 1967 NCAA national championship relay team in the 800-yard relay, which set new NCAA and American records for the event with a time of 6:54.65. He was also a key points contributor in Stanford's NCAA national team championship in 1967.

== See also ==
- List of Stanford University people
- World record progression 4 × 200 metres freestyle relay
