= Swimming at the 1967 Pan American Games – Men's 200 metre freestyle =

Men's 200 metre freestyle at the 1967 Pan American Games
- Venue: Pan Am Pool
- Dates: July 29 (preliminaries and finals)
- Competitors: from - nations

Medalists
| Gold medal | Don Schollander | United States |
| Silver medal | Ralph Hutton | Canada |
| Bronze medal | Julio Arango | Colombia |

The men's 200 metre freestyle competition of the swimming events at the 1967 Pan American Games took place on 29 July at the Pan Am Pool. It was the first appearance of this event in the Pan American Games.

This race consisted of four lengths of the pool, all in freestyle.

== Results ==
All times are in minutes and seconds.

| KEY: | q | Fastest non-qualifiers | Q | Qualified | GR | Games record | NR | National record | PB | Personal best | SB | Seasonal best |

=== Final ===
The final was held on July 29.

| Rank | Name | Nationality | Time | Notes |
|---|---|---|---|---|
| 1st place, gold medalist(s) | Don Schollander | United States | 1:56.0 | WR |
| 2nd place, silver medalist(s) | Ralph Hutton | Canada | 1:58.4 | |
| 3rd place, bronze medalist(s) | Julio Arango | Colombia | 2:01.8 | |
| 4 | Luis Nicolao | Argentina | 2:02.0 | |
| 5 | Ron Jacks | Canada | 2:02.1 | |
| 6 | Mario de Lucca | Argentina | 2:02.8 | |
| 7 | Mike Fitzmaurice | United States | 2:02.8 | |
| 8 | Teodoro Capriles | Venezuela | 2:03.4 | |
