= Brenda Borgh =

American swimmer (born 1960)

Personal information
- Full name: Brenda Grace Borgh
- National team: United States
- Born: October 27, 1960 (age 65) Lower Merion Township, Pennsylvania
- Height: 5 ft 9 in (1.75 m)
- Weight: 139 lb (63 kg)

Sport
- Sport: Swimming
- Strokes: Freestyle
- Club: Suburban Swim Club
- College team: University of Florida; Auburn University
- Coach: Frank Keefe

Brenda Grace Borgh (born October 27, 1960), later known by her married name Brenda Bartlett, is an American former competition swimmer. Borgh represented the United States at the age of 15 at the 1976 Summer Olympics in Montreal, Quebec, and made the finals but did not medal.

In her High School years, Borgh swam for Philadelphia' Suburban Swim Club coached by ASCA Hall of Fame Coach Frank Keefe.

Borgh initially attended and swam for the University of Florida, where she made All-American. In a Dual Meet with Texas in January, 1979, she helped lead Florida to victory with a first-place 1:51.90 in the 200 freestyle and a second place 4:53.00 in the 500 freestyle. On March 15, 1979, she helped lead Florida to a first-place finish in the AIAW National Championships, where she placed 6th in the 500 freestyle with a 4:52.50, and was later named an AIAW All-American that summer. However, she would transfer and graduate from Auburn University. At Auburn, she completed a degree in Public Relations and Journalism. She was a Southeastern Conference Freestyle Champion during her college years and was an NCAA finalist for three consecutive years while swimming for Auburn. In 1979, she was the national runner-up in the 500-yard freestyle.

== 1976 Montreal Summer Olympics ==
Borgh competed in the finals of the women's 400-meter freestyle in the 1976 Montreal Olympics, and finished sixth. Her sixth place time of 4:17.43 in the finals placed her slightly under three seconds behind the Canadian Bronze medalist Shannon Smith. In an interview later, Brenda recounted training around six hours a day in preparation for the Olympics, three hours in the morning and three after classes. A slightly sub-par performance, as her finals time was not significantly faster than her qualifying time, some mention of a pulled muscle, and the later admission by gold medalist East German Petra Thurmer and her coach that the women's team had been given performance-enhancing drugs may have led to a finish closer to medal contention for Borgh if these events had not occurred. In a highly competitive year, both the gold medalist Thurmer, and the American silver medalist Shirley Babashoff finished in World Record time in Brenda's 400-meter event which further added to the challenges faced by Borgh. Thurmer led the event from the start by around a half a second, and never relinquished the lead.

== Life after swimming ==
In 1984, she worked for a period in sports broadcasting, though it did not become a long-term career. She also worked as an advertising executive that year. After meeting during a collegiate swim meet, Brenda married David Bartlett around May, 1986 who had been a swimmer and Psychology major for UCLA and managed the Alpha Romeo professional cycling team at the time. She began her studies at the University of Delaware around 1986.

Pursuing studies at the University of Delaware, Brenda earned a master's degree in therapy and took a position in cardiac rehabilitation in Berwyn, Pennsylvania. She assisted coaching the swim team at University of Delaware during her studies. Under her married name Brenda Bartlett, she remained in athletics, and competed in triathlons throughout the 1980s. At 23 on September 2, 1984, she was the first person out of the 1.5 km open water swim in the Wyoming Valley Back Triathlon, covering .8 mile in 17:06, and placing 11th among women finishers. She finished the water portion of the race first in three successive years. At 25, in July, 1986, Brenda finished nineteenth overall in Philadelphia's Liberty-to-Liberty Triathlon from New York to Philadelphia, winning the women's division.
