= József Katona (swimmer) =

Hungarian swimmer (1941–2016)

Personal information
- Full name: József Katona
- Nationality: Hungary
- Born: 12 September 1941 Eger
- Died: 26 December 2016 (aged 75)
- Height: 1.76 m (5 ft 9 in)
- Weight: 76 kg (168 lb)

Sport
- Sport: Swimming
- Strokes: freestyle
- Club: Egri Vasas SC
Medal record
European Championships (LC)
Gold medal – first place	1962 Leipzig	1500 m freestyle
Silver medal – second place	1958 Budapest	1500 m freestyle
Bronze medal – third place	1958 Budapest	4×200 m freestyle

József Katona (12 September 1941 – 26 December 2016) was a freestyle swimmer from Hungary, who competed in two consecutive Summer Olympics for his native country, starting in 1960.

Katona was born in Eger, Heves, Hungary. As a 17-year-old, Katona represented his country at the 1958 European Aquatics Championships which were held in Budapest, Hungary. In the 1500 metres he came second behind Ian Black to win the silver medal, and also won a team bronze medal in the 4 x 200 metres freestyle relay. Four years later in Leipzig at the 1962 European Aquatics Championships, Katona returned home with a gold medal in the 1500 metres freestyle. At the 1960 Summer Olympics in Rome, Katona reached the final of the 1500 metre freestyle where he finished in 5th place, but in the 400 metre freestyle and 4 × 200 metre freestyle relay he failed to qualify from the first round heats. Four years later at the 1964 Summer Olympics it was the same pattern, he failed to reach the finals in the 400 metre freestyle or the 4 × 200 metre freestyle relay, but in the 1500 metre freestyle he managed to finish eighth in the final.

Katona was also a national water polo player and was capped 17 times. He would later become a physical education teacher and eventually was the president of the Egri Swimming Club.
