= Antonio Codina =

Spanish swimmer

Personal information
- Born: 29 December 1943 (age 82) Barcelona, Spain

Sport
- Sport: Swimming

Antonio Codina (born 29 December 1943) is a Spanish former swimmer. He competed in the men's 4 × 200 metre freestyle relay at the 1964 Summer Olympics.
