= Ed Townsend (swimmer) =

American swimmer (born 1943)

Personal information
- Full name: Robert Edward Townsend, Jr.
- Nickname: "Ed"
- National team: United States
- Born: September 13, 1943 (age 82) Santa Clara, California, U.S.
- Height: 6 ft 4 in (1.93 m)
- Weight: 200 lb (91 kg)

Sport
- Sport: Swimming
- Strokes: Freestyle
- Club: Santa Clara Swim Club
- College team: Yale University
Medal record
Men's swimming
Representing the United States
Pan American Games
Gold medal – first place	1963 São Paulo	4x200 m freestyle relay

Robert Edward Townsend, Jr. (born September 13, 1943) is an American attorney and former competition swimmer. He was a Pan American Games gold medalist and former world record-holder.

== Early life, family and education ==
Townsend attended Yale University, where he was a standout swimmer for coach Phil Moriarty's Yale Bulldogs swimming and diving team from 1963 to 1965. He was part of the school's water polo team as well.

He won an NCAA national championship in the 400-yard individual medley (1963), and three more as a member of winning Yale teams in the 400-yard freestyle relay (1963, 1964, 1965).

Townsend graduated from Yale in 1966 with a degree in psychology. He subsequently received his Juris Doctor degree from University of California, Berkeley.

== Athletic career after college ==
Townsend won a gold medal as a member of the winning US team in the men's 4×200-meter freestyle relay at the 1963 Pan American Games. He participated in the 1964 Summer Olympics in Tokyo, where he swam for the gold medal-winning US team in the preliminary heats of the men's 4×200-meter freestyle relay. Under the 1964 Olympic swimming rules, he was ineligible for a medal, however, because he did not swim in the relay final.

== Career after competitive swimming ==
Townsend relocated to New York City, co-founding the firm Townsend Rabinowitz Pantaleoni & Valente by 1979, which specialized in entertainment law.

== See also ==
- List of Yale University people
- World record progression 4 × 100 metres freestyle relay
- World record progression 4 × 200 metres freestyle relay
