= Leslie Boardman =

Australian swimmer

Personal information
- Full name: Leslie Boardman
- National team: Australasia
- Born: 2 August 1889 Sydney, New South Wales
- Died: 23 November 1975 (aged 86) Watsons Bay, New South Wales

Sport
- Sport: Swimming
- Strokes: Freestyle
- Club: Sydney Swimming Club
Medal record
Men's swimming
Representing Australasia
Olympic Games
Gold medal – first place	1912 Stockholm	4x200 m freestyle

Leslie Boardman (2 August 1889 – 23 November 1975) was an Australian freestyle swimmer of the 1910s. As a member of the Australasia combined team of Australia and New Zealand athletes, Boardman won a gold medal in the 4×200-metre freestyle relay at the 1912 Summer Olympics in Stockholm, Sweden.

Although little is known about Boardman, he never won any Australian championships and was not among the original selections for the Stockholm Olympics. E.G. Findlay was originally named in the team, but presumably due to lack of financing, Boardman later assumed his position in the team. According to records, he did not place at the 1912 Australian Championships and came fourth in the 220-yard freestyle at the New South Wales Championships. It is hypothesized that he was chosen because he was a teammate at the Sydney Swimming Club of Harold Hardwick and Cecil Healy.

Boardman competed in the 100-metre freestyle at the Stockholm Olympics where he won his heat, but came fourth in the second round and was eliminated. In the 4×200-metre freestyle relay, he swam the third leg as the team of Hardwick (Australia), Healy (Australia) and Malcolm Champion (New Zealand) defeated the United States team for the gold medal. He was also signed up to compete at plain high diving competition, but did not compete.

== See also ==
- List of Olympic medalists in swimming (men)
- World record progression 4 × 200 metres freestyle relay

== Sources ==
- Andrews, Malcolm (2000). Australia at the Olympic Games. Sydney, New South Wales: ABC Books. pp. 51–52. ISBN 0-7333-0884-8.
- Howell, Max (1986). Aussie Gold. Albion, Queensland: Brooks Waterloo. pp. 30–31. ISBN 0-86440-680-0.
- Database Olympics
