= Toshio Shoji =

Japanese swimmer (born 1940)

Personal information
- Born: August 25, 1940 (age 85) Chiba Prefecture, Japan

Sport
- Sport: Swimming
Medal record
Representing Japan
Olympic Games
Bronze medal – third place	1964 Tokyo	4x200m freestyle relay

Toshio Shoji (庄司敏夫, Shōji Toshio) (born August 25, 1940) is a Japanese swimmer and Olympic medalist. He competed at the 1964 Summer Olympics in Tokyo, winning a bronze medal in 4 x 200 metre freestyle relay.
