= Takeshi Yamakage =

Japanese swimmer (born 1945)

Personal information
- Born: 12 January 1945 (age 81)
- Height: 172 cm (5 ft 8 in)
- Weight: 70 kg (154 lb)

Sport
- Sport: Swimming
Medal record
Representing Japan
Summer Universiade
Bronze medal – third place	1965 Budapest	4x200m freestyle relay

Takeshi Yamakage (山影 武士, Yamakage Takeshi; born 12 January 1945) is a Japanese former swimmer. He competed in the men's 400 metre freestyle at the 1964 Summer Olympics.
