= 4 × 200 metres freestyle relay =

The 4 × 200 metres freestyle relay is an event in competitive swimming. World records are ratified by World Aquatics (formerly FINA). The current long course world record holders are the US (men) and Australia (women), while the men's and women's short course world records are currently held by the US.

The men's event has been contested at the Olympic Games since 1908, while the women's event was introduced at the 1996 games; the current Olympic champions are Great Britain (men) and Australia (women). The men's event has been contested at the World Aquatics Championships since the inaugural championships in 1973, while the women's event has been contested since 1986; the current world champions (long course) are Great Britain (men) and Australia (women). The men's and women's events have been contested at the World Aquatics Swimming Championships (25m) since the inaugural championships in 1993; the US are the current world champions (short course) in both events.

== World record progression ==
=== Men long course ===
#	Time		Name	Nationality	Date	Meet	Location	Ref
1	10:55.6		John Derbyshire; Paul Radmilovic; William Foster; Henry Taylor	Great Britain	24 July 1908	Olympic Games	London, United Kingdom	
2	10:26.4		Ken Huszagh; Duke Kahanamoku; Perry McGillivray; Harry Hebner	United States	12 July 1912	Olympic Games	Stockholm, Sweden	
3	10:14.0		Harold Hardwick; Malcolm Champion; Leslie Boardman; Cecil Healy	Australasia	12 July 1912	Olympic Games	Stockholm, Sweden	
4	10:11.6		Cecil Healy; Malcolm Champion; Leslie Boardman; Harold Hardwick	Australasia	15 July 1912	Olympic Games	Stockholm, Sweden	
5	10:04.4		Perry McGillivray; Pua Kealoha; Norman Ross; Duke Kahanamoku	United States	29 August 1920	Olympic Games	Antwerp, Belgium	
6	9:53.4		Wally O'Connor; Harry Glancy; Ralph Breyer; Johnny Weissmuller	United States	20 July 1924	Olympic Games	Paris, France	
7	9:49.6		August Heitmann; Joachim Rademacher; Friedrich Berger; Herbert Heinrich	Germany	1927	European Championships	Bologna, Italy	
8	9:38.8		Paul Samson; Austin Clapp; David Young; Johnny Weissmuller	United States	11 August 1928	Olympic Games	Amsterdam, Netherlands	
9	9:36.2		Austin Clapp; Walter Laufer; George Kojac; Johnny Weissmuller	United States	11 August 1928	Olympic Games	Amsterdam, Netherlands	
10	9:34.0		András Wanié; László Szabados; András Székely; István Bárány	Hungary	1931	European Championships	Paris, France	
11	8:58.4		Yasuji Miyazaki (2:14.1); Masanori Yusa (2:14.7); Takashi Yokoyama (2:14.8); Hisakichi Toyoda (2:14.8)	Japan	9 August 1932	Olympic Games	Los Angeles, United States	
12	8:52.2		Masanori Yusa; Shozo Makino; Sunao Ishiharada; Hiroshi Negami	Japan	19 August 1935	-	Tokyo, Japan	
13	8:51.5		Masanori Yusa; Shigeo Sugiura; Masaharu Taguchi; Shigeo Arai	Japan	11 August 1936	Olympic Games	Berlin, Germany	
14	8:46.0		Wally Ris; Jimmy McLane; Wally Wolf; Bill Smith	United States	3 August 1948	Olympic Games	London, United Kingdom	
15	8:45.4		Yoshihiro Hamaguchi; Shigeyuki Maruyama; Shuichi Murayama; Hironoshin Furuhashi	Japan	18 August 1949	-	Los Angeles, United States	
16	8:43.2		W. Farnsworth; L. Munson; J. Blum; R. Reid	United States	24 February 1950	-	New Haven, United States	
17	8:40.6		Yoshihiro Hamaguchi; Shuichi Murayama; Shiro Hashizume; Hironoshin Furuhashi	Japan	2 April 1950	-	Marília, Brazil	
18	8:33.0		Joseph Bernardo; Willy Blioch; Jean Boiteux; Alex Jany	France	2 August 1951	-	Marseille, France	
19	8:29.4		Wayne Moore; Jimmy McLane; Don Sheff; Dick Thoman	United States	16 February 1952	-	New Haven, United States	
20	8:24.5		Boris Nikitin; Vladimir Strushanov; Gennadi Nikolayev; Vitaly Sorokin	Soviet Union	4 November 1956	-	Moscow, Soviet Union	
21	8:23.6		Kevin O'Halloran; John Devitt; Murray Rose; Jon Henricks	Australia	3 December 1956	Olympic Games	Melbourne, Australia	
22	8:21.6		Tsuyoshi Yamanaka; Toshizo Umemoto; Makoto Fukui; Tatsuo Fujimoto	Japan	22 July 1959	-	Tokyo, Japan	
23	8:18.7		Tsuyoshi Yamanaka; Makoto Fukui; Katsunori Kenjo; Tatsuo Fujimoto	Japan	26 July 1959	-	Osaka, Japan	
24	8:17.0		Alan Somers; Peter Sintz; George Breen; Mike Troy	United States	23 July 1960	-	Toledo, Ohio, United States	
25	8:16.6		David Dickson; John Konrads; Jon Henricks; Murray Rose	Australia	6 August 1960	-	Townsville, Australia	
26	8:10.2		George Harrison; Dick Blick; Mike Troy; Jeff Farrell	United States	1 September 1960	Olympic Games	Rome, Italy	
27	8:09.8		Tatsuo Fujimoto; Yukiaki Okabe; Makoto Fukui; Tsuyoshi Yamanaka	Japan	21 April 1963	-	Tokyo, Japan	
28	8:07.6		Steve Clark; Ed Townsend; Don Schollander; Michael Wall	United States	10 August 1963	-	Chicago, United States	
29	8:03.7		Richard McDonough; Don Schollander; Roy Saari; Ed Townsend	United States	19 August 1963	-	Tokyo, Japan	
30	8:01.8		David Lyons; Don Schollander; Bill Mettler; Michael Wall	United States	28 September 1964	-	Los Angeles, United States	
31	7:52.1		Roy Saari; Gary Ilman; Don Schollander; Steve Clark	United States	18 October 1964	-	Tokyo, Japan	
32	7:50.8		Greg Rogers; Mike Wenden; Graham White; Bill Devenish	Australia	24 July 1970	British Commonwealth Games	Edinburgh, United Kingdom	
33	7:48.0		Gary Hall, Sr.; Mark Lambert; Tom McBreen; John Kinsella	United States	28 August 1970	-	Tokyo, Japan	
34	7:45.8		Jerry Heidenreich; Frank Heckl; Steve Genter; Jim McConica	United States	9 August 1971	Pan American Games	Cali, Colombia	
35	7:43.3		Jerry Heidenreich; Tom McBreen; Mark Spitz; Fred Tyler	United States	10 September 1971	-	Minsk, Soviet Union	
36	7:35.78		John Kinsella; Fred Tyler; Steve Genter; Mark Spitz	United States	31 August 1972	Olympic Games	Munich, Germany	
37	7:33.22		Robin Backhaus; Richard Klatt; Kurt Krumpholz; Jim Montgomery	United States	7 September 1973	World Championships	Belgrade, Yugoslavia	
38	7:30.54		Rex Favero; Bruce Furniss; Tim Shaw; Steve Furniss	United States	22 August 1975	-	Kansas City, United States	
39	7:30.33	h	Mike Bruner; Bruce Furniss; Doug Northway; Tim Shaw	United States	21 July 1976	Olympic Games	Montreal, Canada	
40	7:23.22		Mike Bruner; Bruce Furniss; John Naber; Jim Montgomery	United States	21 July 1976	Olympic Games	Montreal, Canada	
41	7:20.82		Rowdy Gaines; Bruce Furniss; Bill Forrester; Bobby Hackett	United States	24 August 1978	World Championships	West Berlin, West Germany	
42	7:20.40		Andreas Schmidt; Michael Gross; Alexander Schowtka; Thomas Fahrner	West Germany	23 August 1983	European Championships	Rome, Italy	
43	7:18.87	h	Geoff Gaberino (1:49.80); David Larson (1:50.18); Bruce Hayes (1:50.04); Richard Saeger (1:48.85)	United States	30 July 1984	Olympic Games	Los Angeles, United States	
44	7:15.69		Mike Heath (1:48.67); David Larson (1:49.01); Jeff Float (1:49.60); Bruce Hayes (1:48.41)	United States	30 July 1984	Olympic Games	Los Angeles, United States	
45	7:13.10		Peter Sitt; Rainer Henkel; Thomas Fahrner; Michael Gross	West Germany	19 August 1987	European Championships	Strasbourg, France	
46	7:12.51		Troy Dalbey (1:49.37); Matt Cetlinski (1:48.44); Doug Gjertsen (1:48.26); Matt Biondi (1:46.44)	United States	21 September 1988	Olympic Games	Seoul, South Korea	
47	7:11.95		(1:49.55) Dmitry Lepikov (1:46.58) Vladimir Pyshnenko (1:48.99) Veniamin Tayanovich (1:46.83) Yevgeny Sadovyi	Unified Team	27 July 1992	Olympic Games	Barcelona, Spain	
48	7:11.86		Ian Thorpe (1:47.48); Daniel Kowalski (1:47.81); Matthew Dunn (1:49.15); Michael Klim (1:47.42)	Australia	13 September 1998	Commonwealth Games	Kuala Lumpur, Malaysia	
49	7:08.79		Ian Thorpe (1:46.28); Bill Kirby (1:48.96); Grant Hackett (1:46.30); Michael Klim (1:47.25)	Australia	25 August 1999	Pan Pacific Championships	Sydney, Australia	
50	7:07.05		Ian Thorpe (1:46.03); Michael Klim (1:46.40); Todd Pearson (1:47.36); Bill Kirby (1:47.26)	Australia	19 Sep 2000	Olympic Games	Sydney, Australia	
51	7:04.66		Grant Hackett (1:46.11); Michael Klim (1:46.49); Bill Kirby (1:47.92); Ian Thorpe (1:44.14)	Australia	27 July 2001	World Championships	Fukuoka, Japan	
52	7:03.24		Michael Phelps (1:45.36); Ryan Lochte (1:45.86); Klete Keller (1:46.31); Peter Vanderkaay (1:45.71)	United States	30 March 2007	World Championships	Melbourne, Australia	
53	6:58.56		Michael Phelps (1:43.31); Ryan Lochte (1:44.28); Ricky Berens (1:46.29); Peter Vanderkaay (1:44.68)	United States	13 August 2008	Olympic Games	Beijing, China	
54	6:58.55		Michael Phelps (1:44.49); Ricky Berens (1:44.13); David Walters (1:45.47); Ryan Lochte (1:44.46)	United States	31 July 2009	World Championships	Rome, Italy	

=== Men short course ===
#	Time		Name	Nationality	Date	Meet	Location	Ref
1	7:02.74		Michael Klim (1:45.21); Grant Hackett (1:45.61); William Kirby (1:46.41); Matthew Dunn (1:45.51)	Australia	18 Apr 1997	World Championships	Gothenburg, Sweden	
2	7:01.60	tt	Michael Klim; Matthew Dunn; William Kirby; Todd Pearson	Australia	1 Sep 1999	Australian Championships	Canberra, Australia	
3	7:01.33		Joshua Davis; Neil Walker; Scott Tucker; Chad Carvin	United States	17 Mar 2000	World Championships	Athens, Greece	
4	6:56.41		William Kirby (1:44.97); Ian Thorpe (1:42.63); Michael Klim (1:45.55); Grant Hackett (1:43.26)	Australia	7 Aug 2001	Australian Championships	Perth, Australia	
5	6:52.66		Kirk Palmer (1:43.12); Grant Hackett (1:42.75); Grant Brits (1:44.01); Kenrick Monk (1:42.78)	Australia	31 Aug 2007	Australian Championships	Melbourne, Australia	
6	6:51.05		Colin Russell (1:43.60); Stefan Hirniak (1:43.41); Brent Hayden (1:41.49); Joel Greenshields (1:42.55)	Canada	7 Aug 2009	British Grand Prix	Leeds, United Kingdom	
7	6:49.04		Nikita Lobintsev (1:42.10); Danila Izotov (1:42.15); Yevgeny Lagunov (1:42.32); Alexander Sukhorukov (1:42.47)	Russia	16 Dec 2010	World Championships	Dubai, United Arab Emirates	
8	6:46.81		Luiz Altamir Melo (1:42.03); Fernando Scheffer (1:40.99); Leonardo Coelho Santos (1:42.81); Breno Correia (1:40.87)	Brazil	14 December 2018	World Championships	Hangzhou, China	
9	6:44.12		Kieran Smith (1:41.04); Carson Foster (1:40.48); Trenton Julian (1:41.44); Drew Kibler (1:41.16)	United States	16 December 2022	World Championships	Melbourne, Australia	
10	6:40.51		Luke Hobson (1:38.91); Carson Foster (1:40.77); Shaine Casas (1:40.34); Kieran Smith (1:40.49)	United States	13 December 2024	World Championships	Budapest, Hungary	

Legend: # – Record awaiting ratification by FINA; WR – World record;
Records not set in finals: h – heat; sf – semifinal; r – relay 1st leg; rh – relay heat 1st leg; b – B final; † – en route to final mark; so – swim-off; tt – time trial

=== Women long course ===
#	Time	Name	Nationality	Date	Meet	Location	Ref
1	8:02.27	Kristin Otto; Astrid Strauss; Cornelia Sirch; Birgit Meineke	East Germany	22 Aug 1983	European Championships	Rome, Italy	
2	7:59.33	Manuela Stellmach (2:00.31); Astrid Strauss (1:59.44); Nadja Bergknecht (2:00.42); Heike Friedrich (1:59.16)	East Germany	17 Aug 1986	World Championships	Madrid, Spain	
3	7:55.47	Manuela Stellmach (2:00.23); Astrid Strauss (1:58.90); Anke Möhring (1:58.73); Heike Friedrich (1:57.61)	East Germany	18 Aug 1987	European Championships	Strasbourg, France	
4	7:53.42	Natalie Coughlin (1:57.74); Carly Piper (1:59.39); Dana Vollmer (1:58.12); Kaitlin Sandeno (1:58.17)	United States	18 Aug 2004	Olympic Games	Athens, Greece	
5	7:50.82	Petra Dallmann (1:59.14); Daniela Samulski (1:58.27); Britta Steffen (1:57.77); Annika Lurz (1:55.64)	Germany	3 Aug 2006	European Championships	Budapest, Hungary	
6	7:50.09	Natalie Coughlin (1:56.43); Dana Vollmer (1:57.49); Lacey Nymeyer (1:59.19); Katie Hoff (1:56.98)	United States	29 Mar 2007	World Championships	Melbourne, Australia	
7	7:44.31	Stephanie Rice (1:56.60); Bronte Barratt (1:56.58); Kylie Palmer (1:55.22); Linda Mackenzie (1:55.91)	Australia	14 August 2008	Olympic Games	Beijing, China	
8	7:42.08	Yang Yu (1:55.47); Zhu Qianwei (1:55.79); Liu Jing (1:56.09); Pang Jiaying (1:54.73)	China	30 July 2009	World Championships	Rome, Italy	
9	7:41.50	Ariarne Titmus (1:54.27); Madison Wilson (1:56.73); Brianna Throssell (1:55.60); Emma McKeon (1:54.90)	Australia	25 July 2019	World Championships	Gwangju, South Korea	
10	7:40.33	Yang Junxuan (1:54.37); Tang Muhan (1:55.00); Zhang Yufei (1:55.66); Li Bingjie (1:55.30)	China	29 July 2021	Olympic Games	Tokyo, Japan	
11	7:39.29	Madison Wilson (1:56.27); Kiah Melverton (1:55.40); Mollie O'Callaghan (1:54.80); Ariarne Titmus (1:52.82)	Australia	31 July 2022	Commonwealth Games	Birmingham, Great Britain	
12	7:37.50	Mollie O'Callaghan (1:53.66); Shayna Jack (1:55.63); Brianna Throssell (1:55.80); Ariarne Titmus (1:52.41)	Australia	27 July 2023	World Championships	Fukuoka, Japan	

Legend: # – Record awaiting ratification by FINA; WR – World record;
Records not set in finals: h – heat; sf – semifinal; r – relay 1st leg; rh – relay heat 1st leg; b – B final; † – en route to final mark; so – swim-off; tt – time trial

=== Women short course ===
#	Time	Name	Nationality	Date	Meet	Location	Ref
1	7:58.74	?	?	198_?	?		
2	7:52.45	Shan Ying; Zhou Guanbin; Le Jingyi; Lü Bin	China	3 December 1993	World Championships	Palma de Mallorca, Spain	
3	7:51.92	Luna Wang (1:57.01); Nian Yun (1:56.35); Chen Yan (1:59.76); Shan Ying (1:58.80)	China	17 April 1997	World Championhips	Gothenburg, Sweden	
4	7:51.70	Josefin Lillhage (1:57.80); Louise Jöhncke (1:59.01); Johanna Sjöberg (1:57.27); Malin Svahnström (1:57.62)	Sweden	1 April 1999	World Championships	Hong Kong, Hong Kong	
5	7:49.11	Claire Huddart (1:58.19); Nicola Jackson (1:56.20); Karen Legg (1:57.51); Karen Pickering (1:57.21)	Great Britain	16 March 2000	World Championships	Athens, Greece	
6	7:47.14	Karen Legg (1:57.18); Janine Belton (1:58.52); Nicola Jackson (1:55.51); Karen Pickering (1:55.86)	Great Britain	10 August 2001	British Championships	Norwich, United Kingdom	
7	7:46.30	Xu Yanwei (1:55.73); Zhu Yingwen (1:57.04); Tang Jingzhi (1:58.37); Yang Yu (1:55.16)	China	3 April 2002	World Championships	Moscow, Russia	
8	7:38.90	Inge Dekker (1:55.36); Femke Heemskerk (1:53.44); Marleen Veldhuis (1:54.17); Ranomi Kromowidjojo (1:55.93)	Netherlands	9 April 2008	World Championships	Manchester, United Kingdom	
9	7:35.94	Chen Qian (1:54.73); Tang Yi (1:53.54); Liu Jing (1:53.59); Zhu Qianwei (1:54.08)	China	15 December 2010	World Championships	Dubai, United Arab Emirates	
10	7:32.85	Inge Dekker (1:54.73); Femke Heemskerk (1:51.22); Ranomi Kromowidjojo (1:54.17); Sharon van Rouwendaal (1:52.73)	Netherlands	3 Dec 2014	World Championhips	Doha, Qatar	
11	7:30.87	Madison Wilson (1:53.13); Mollie O'Callaghan (1:52.83); Leah Neale (1:52.67); Lani Pallister (1:52.24)	Australia	14 December 2022	World Championships	Melbourne, Australia	
12	7:30.13	Alex Walsh (1:53.25); Paige Madden (1:53.18); Katie Grimes (1:53.39); Claire Weinstein (1:50.31)	United States	12 December 2024	World Championships	Budapest, Hungary	

Legend: # – Record awaiting ratification by FINA; WR – World record;
Records not set in finals: h – heat; sf – semifinal; r – relay 1st leg; rh – relay heat 1st leg; b – B final; † – en route to final mark; so – swim-off; tt – time trial

== All-time rankings ==
Tables show data for the top 25 4 × 200 m freestyle relay times and the top 10 national records:
- denotes top 10 national record by teams in the top 25 4 × 200 m freestyle relay times
- denotes lesser performances, still in the top 25 4 × 200 m freestyle relay times, by repeat nations
- denotes top 10 national record for other teams who fall outside the top 25 4 × 200 m freestyle relay times

=== Men long course ===
- Correct as of September 2026

Nat.#	Perf.#	Time	Athletes	Team	Date	Place	Ref.
1	1	6:58.55	Michael Phelps (1:44.49); Ricky Berens (1:44.13); David Walters (1:45.47); Ryan Lochte (1:44.46)	United States	31 July 2009	Rome	
	2	6:58.56	Michael Phelps (1:43.31); Ryan Lochte (1:44.28); Ricky Berens (1:46.29); Peter Vanderkaay (1:44.68)	US #2	13 August 2008	Beijing	
2	3	6:58.58	Tom Dean (1:45.72); James Guy (1:44.40); Matt Richards (1:45.01); Duncan Scott (1:43.45)	Great Britain	28 July 2021	Tokyo	
	4	6:59.08	Duncan Scott (1:45.42); Matt Richards (1:44.65); James Guy (1:45.17); Tom Dean (1:43.84)	Great Britain #2	27 July 2023	Fukuoka	
3	5	6:59.15	Nikita Lobintsev (1:45.10); Mikhail Polischuk (1:45.42); Danila Izotov (1:44.48); Alexander Sukhorukov (1:44.15)	Russia	31 July 2009	Rome	
	6	6:59.37	Luke Hobson (1:44.13); Aaron Shackell (1:44.23); Patrick Sammon (1:46.92); Gabriel Jett (1:44.09)	US #3	13 August 2026	Irvine	
	7	6:59.43	James Guy (1:45.09); Tom Dean (1:45.28); Matt Richards (1:45.11); Duncan Scott (1:43.95)	Great Britain #3	30 July 2024	Paris	
	8	6:59.70	Ryan Lochte (1:45.15); Conor Dwyer (1:45.23); Ricky Berens (1:45.27); Michael Phelps (1:44.05)	US #4	31 July 2012	London	
	9	6:59.84	Matt Richards (1:45.37); James Guy (1:45.00); Jack McMillan (1:45.65); Duncan Scott (1:43.82)	Great Britain #4	1 August 2025	Singapore	
	10	7:00.02	Luke Hobson (1:46.00); Carson Foster (1:44.49); Jake Mitchell (1:45.06); Kieran Smith (1:44.47)	US #5	27 July 2023	Fukuoka	
4	11	7:00.17	Xu Haibo (1:46.27); Fei Liwei (1:46.74); Pan Zhanle (1:44.24); Zhang Zhanshuo (1:42.92)	China	21 September 2026	Tokyo	
	12	7:00.24	Drew Kibler (1:45.54); Carson Foster (1:45.04); Trenton Julian (1:45.31); Kieran Smith (1:44.35)	US #6	23 June 2022	Budapest	
	13	7:00.66	Conor Dwyer (1:45.23); Townley Haas (1:44.14); Ryan Lochte (1:46.03); Michael Phelps (1:45.26)	US #7	9 August 2016	Rio de Janeiro	
	14	7:00.78	Luke Hobson (1:45.55); Carson Foster (1:45.31); Drew Kibler (1:45.12); Kieran Smith (1:44.80)	US #8	30 July 2024	Paris	
5	15	7:00.85	Clyde Lewis (1:45.58); Kyle Chalmers (1:45.37); Alexander Graham (1:45.05); Mack Horton (1:44.85)	Australia	26 July 2019	Gwangju	
	16	7:00.91	Ji Xinjie (1:46.22); Pan Zhanle (1:44.41); Wang Shun (1:46.08); Zhang Zhanshuo (1:44.20)	China #2	1 August 2025	Singapore	
	17	7:00.98	Flynn Southam (1:45.85); Charlie Hawke (1:45.57); Kai Taylor (1:44.64); Maximillian Giuliani (1:44.92)	Australia #2	1 August 2025	Singapore	
6	18	7:01.05	Tatsuya Murasa (1:44.70); Katsuhiro Matsumoto (1:44.84); Kazusa Kuroda (1:45.82); Tomoyuki Matsushita (1:45.69)	Japan	21 September 2026	Tokyo	
	19	7:01.10	Maximillian Giuliani (1:45.65); Kai Taylor (1:45.91); Charlie Hawke (1:44.37); Samuel Short (1:45.17)	Australia #3	13 August 2026	Irvine	
	20	7:01.24	Henry McFadden (1:46.09); Gabriel Jett (1:45.88); Luke Hobson (1:43.45); Rex Maurer (1:45.82)	US #9	1 August 2025	Singapore	
	21	7:01.47	Samuel Short (1:46.08); Harrison Turner (1:45.95); Edward Sommerville (1:45.34); Kai Taylor (1:44.10)	Australia #4	26 July 2026	Glasgow	
	22	7:01.52	Matt Richards (1:45.44); Jack McMillan (1:46.62); James Guy (1:44.07); Duncan Scott (1:45.39)	Great Britain #5	10 August 2026	Paris	
	23	7:01.65	Kenrick Monk (1:46.00); Robert Hurley (1:46.47); Tommaso D'Orsogna (1:44.82); Patrick Murphy (1:44.36)	Australia #5	31 July 2009	Rome	
	24	7:01.70	Stephen Milne (1:47.25); Nicholas Grainger (1:46.05); Duncan Scott (1:44.60); James Guy (1:43.80)	Great Britain #6	28 July 2017	Budapest	
	25	7:01.72	Conor Dwyer (1:45.76); Ryan Lochte (1:44.98); Charlie Houchin (1:45.59); Ricky Berens (1:45.39)	US #10	2 August 2013	Barcelona	
7	'	7:01.73	Yang Jae-hoon (1:46.83); Lee Ho-joon (1:45.36); Kim Woo-min (1:44.50); Hwang Sun-woo (1:44.53)	South Korea	26 September 2023	Hangzhou	
8	'	7:02.01	Filippo Megli (1:45.86); Gabriele Detti (1:45.30); Stefano Ballo (1:45.27); Stefano Di Cola (1:45.58)	Italy	26 July 2019	Gwangju	
9	'	7:02.23	Léon Marchand (1:43.76); Pierre Largeron (1:47.44); Sauveur Cristofini (1:45.28); Roman Fuchs (1:45.75)	France	10 August 2026	Paris	
10	'	7:02.28	Lukas Märtens (1:45.71); Timo Sorgius (1:45.63); Jarno Baschnitt (1:45.10); Cornelius Jahn (1:45.84)	Germany	10 August 2026	Paris	

=== Men short course ===
- Correct as of September 2026

Nat.#	Perf.#	Time	Athletes	Team	Date	Place	Ref.
1	1	6:40.51	Luke Hobson (1:38.91); Carson Foster (1:40.77); Shaine Casas (1:40.34); Kieran Smith (1:40.49)	United States	13 December 2024	Budapest	
	2	6:44.12	Kieran Smith (1:41.04); Carson Foster (1:40.48); Trenton Julian (1:41.44); Drew Kibler (1:41.16)	US #2	16 December 2022	Melbourne	
2	3	6:45.54	Maximillian Giuliani (1:40.73); Edward Sommerville (1:41.03); Harrison Turner (1:42.21); Elijah Winnington (1:41.57)	Australia	13 December 2024	Budapest	
	4	6:46.54	Thomas Neill (1:41.50); Kyle Chalmers (1:40.35); Flynn Southam (1:41.50); Mack Horton (1:43.19)	Australia #2	16 December 2022	Melbourne	
3	5	6:46.81	Luiz Altamir Melo (1:42.03); Fernando Scheffer (1:40.99); Leonardo Coelho Santos (1:42.81); Breno Correia (1:40.98)	Brazil	14 December 2018	Hangzhou	
4	6	6:46.84	Martin Malyutin (1:42.34); Mikhail Vekovishchev (1:41.57); Ivan Girev (1:41.85); Aleksandr Krasnykh (1:41.08)	Russia	14 December 2018	Hangzhou	
	7	6:47.00	Kieran Smith (1:41.79); Trenton Julian (1:41.35); Carson Foster (1:41.65); Ryan Held (1:42.21)	US #3	19 December 2021	Abu Dhabi	
5	8	6:47.51	Filippo Megli (1:42.26); Manuel Frigo (1:42.15); Carlos D'Ambrosio (1:41.48); Alberto Razzetti (1:41.62)	Italy	13 December 2024	Budapest	
6	9	6:47.53	Ji Xinjie (1:42.67); Xu Jiayu (1:41.68); Sun Yang (1:41.25); Wang Shun (1:41.93)	China	14 December 2018	Hangzhou	
	10	6:49.04	Nikita Lobintsev (1:42.10); Danila Izotov (1:42.15); Evgeny Lagunov (1:42.32); Alexander Sukhorukov (1:42.47)	Russia #2	16 December 2010	Dubai	
	11	6:49.12	Vladislav Grinev (1:43.18); Aleksandr Shchegolev (1:40.86); Mikhail Vekovishchev (1:42.16); Ivan Girev (1:42.92)	Russia #3 (Note: Competed as the Russian Swimming Federation under no flag.)	19 December 2021	Abu Dhabi	
	12	6:49.58	Peter Vanderkaay (1:43.83); Ryan Lochte (1:40.48); Garrett Weber-Gale (1:42.89); Ricky Berens (1:42.38)	US #4	16 December 2010	Dubai	
	13	6:49.60	Fernando Scheffer (1:42.51); Murilo Sartori (1:42.07); Kaique Alves (1:43.15); Breno Correia (1:41.87)	Brazil #2	19 December 2021	Abu Dhabi	
	14	6:49.63	Matteo Ciampi (1:42.68); Thomas Ceccon (1:42.61); Alberto Razzetti (1:42.76); Paolo Conte Bonin (1:41.58)	Italy #2	16 December 2022	Melbourne	
7	15	6:49.67	Hwang Sun-woo (1:40.99); Kim Woo-min (1:42.03); Lee Ho-joon (1:42.92); Yang Jae-hoon (1:43.73)	South Korea	16 December 2022	Melbourne	
	16	6:49.84	Blake Pieroni (1:41.85); Ryan Held (1:43.05); Zach Harting (1:42.92); Zane Grothe (1:42.02)	US #5	14 December 2018	Hangzhou	
8	17	6:50.43	Rafael Miroslaw (1:41.25); Kaii Winkler (1:42.32); Timo Sorgius (1:41.87); Florian Wellbrock (1:44.99)	Germany	13 December 2024	Budapest	
9	18	6:51.05	Colin Russell (1:43.60); Stefan Hirniak (1:42.32); Brent Hayden (1:41.49); Joel Greenshields (1:44.99)	Canada	7 August 2009	Leeds	
	19	6:51.17	Mikhail Dovgalyuk (1:43.58); Ivan Girev (1:42.31); Vladislav Grinev (1:43.02); Aleksandr Krasnykh (1:42.26)	Russia #4	14 December 2018	Hangzhou	
	20	6:51.40	Ryan Lochte (1:41.85); Conor Dwyer (1:43.04); Michael Klueh (1:43.20); Matt McLean (1:43.99)	US #6	13 December 2012	Istanbul	
	21	6:51.48	Matteo Ciampi (1:42.93); Thomas Ceccon (1:44.23); Filippo Megli (1:42.99); Alberto Razzetti (1:41.33)	Italy #3	19 December 2021	Abu Dhabi	
	22	6:51.68	Conor Dwyer (1:43.20); Ryan Lochte (1:42.42); Matt McLean (1:43.20); Tyler Clary (1:42.86)	US #7	4 December 2014	Doha	
	23	6:51.69	Shaine Casas (1:40.88); Trenton Julian (1:42.39); Daniel Matheson (1:45.53); Kieran Smith (1:42.89)	US #8	13 December 2024	Budapest	
	24	6:51.80	Andrea Mitchell D'Arrigo (1:42.77); Marco Belotti (1:43.98); Nicolangelo Di Fabio (1:42.98); Filippo Magnini (1:42.07)	Italy #4	4 December 2014	Doha	
10	25	6:52.04	Temma Watanabe (1:43.78); Katsuhiro Matsumoto (1:40.66); Hidenari Mano (1:43.18); Shuya Matsumoto (1:44.42)	Japan	16 December 2022	Melbourne	

=== Women long course ===
- Correct as of September 2026

Nat.#	Perf.#	Time	Athletes	Team	Date	Place	Ref.
1	1	7:37.50	Mollie O'Callaghan (1:53.66); Shayna Jack (1:55.63); Brianna Throssell (1:55.80); Ariarne Titmus (1:52.41)	Australia	27 July 2023	Fukuoka	
	2	7:38.08	Mollie O'Callaghan (1:53.52); Lani Pallister (1:55.61); Brianna Throssell (1:56.00); Ariarne Titmus (1:52.95)	Australia #2	1 August 2024	Paris	
	3	7:39.29	Madison Wilson (1:56.27); Kiah Melverton (1:55.40); Mollie O'Callaghan (1:54.80); Ariarne Titmus (1:52.82)	Australia #3	31 July 2022	Birmingham	
	4	7:39.35	Lani Pallister (1:54.77); Jamie Perkins (1:55.13); Brittany Castelluzzo (1:56.01); Mollie O'Callaghan (1:53.44)	Australia #4	31 July 2025	Singapore	
2	5	7:40.01	Claire Weinstein (1:54.83); Anna Peplowski (1:54.75); Erin Gemmell (1:56.72); Katie Ledecky (1:53.71)	United States	31 July 2025	Singapore	
3	6	7:40.33	Yang Junxuan (1:54.37); Tang Muhan (1:55.00); Zhang Yufei (1:55.66); Li Bingjie (1:55.30)	China	29 July 2021	Tokyo	
	7	7:40.73	Allison Schmitt (1:56.34); Paige Madden (1:55.25); Katie McLaughlin (1:55.38); Katie Ledecky (1:53.76)	US #2	29 July 2021	Tokyo	
	8	7:40.86	Claire Weinstein (1:54.88); Paige Madden (1:55.63); Katie Ledecky (1:54.93); Erin Gemmell (1:55.40)	US #3	1 August 2024	Paris	
	9	7:41.29	Ariarne Titmus (1:54.51); Emma McKeon (1:55.31); Madison Wilson (1:55.62); Leah Neale (1:55.85)	Australia #5	29 July 2021	Tokyo	
	10	7:41.38	Erin Gemmell (1:55.97); Katie Ledecky (1:54.39); Bella Sims (1:54.64); Alex Shackell (1:56.38)	US #4	27 July 2023	Fukuoka	
	11	7:41.45	Claire Weinstein (1:56.79); Leah Smith (1:56.49); Katie Ledecky (1:53.67); Bella Sims (1:54.60)	US #5	22 June 2022	Budapest	
	12	7:41.50	Ariarne Titmus (1:54.27); Madison Wilson (1:56.73); Brianna Throssell (1:55.60); Emma McKeon (1:54.90)	Australia #6	25 July 2019	Gwangju	
	13	7:41.87	Simone Manuel (1:56.09); Katie Ledecky (1:54.61); Melanie Margalis (1:55.81); Katie McLaughlin (1:55.36)	US #6	25 July 2019	Gwangju	
	14	7:42.08	Yang Yu (1:55.47); Zhu Qianwei (1:55.79); Liu Jing (1:56.09); Pang Jiaying (1:54.73)	China #2	30 July 2009	Rome	
	15	7:42.34	Yang Junxuan (1:54.52); Li Bingjie (1:55.05); Ge Chutong (1:57.45); Liu Yaxin (1:55.32)	China #3	1 August 2024	Paris	
	16	7:42.40	Inez Miller (1:55.83); Lani Pallister (1:53.46); Hannah Casey (1:57.84); Milla Jansen (1:55.27)	Australia #7	13 August 2026	Irvine	
	17	7:42.53	Lani Pallister (1:55.13); Hannah Casey (1:55.43); Inez Miller (1:55.78); Mollie O'Callaghan (1:56.19)	Australia #8	27 July 2026	Glasgow	
	18	7:42.56	Dana Vollmer (1:55.29); Lacey Nymeyer (1:57.88); Ariana Kukors (1:55.18); Allison Schmitt (1:54.21)	US #7	30 July 2009	Rome	
	19	7:42.92	Missy Franklin (1:55.96); Dana Vollmer (1:56.02); Shannon Vreeland (1:56.85); Allison Schmitt (1:54.09)	US #8	1 August 2012	London	
	20	7:42.99	Liu Yaxin (1:55.94); Yang Peiqi (1:55.84); Yu Yiting (1:56.37); Li Bingjie (1:54.84)	China #4	31 July 2025	Singapore	
	21	7:43.03	Allison Schmitt (1:56.21); Leah Smith (1:56.69); Maya DiRado (1:56.36); Katie Ledecky (1:53.74)	US #9	10 August 2016	Rio de Janeiro	
	22	7:43.10	Erin Gemmell (1:57.00); Anna Peplowski (1:55.62); Rylee Erisman (1:56.11); Katie Ledecky (1:54.37)	US #10	13 August 2026	Irvine	
	23	7:43.39	Leah Smith (1:55.97); Mallory Comerford (1:56.92); Melanie Margalis (1:56.48); Katie Ledecky (1:54.02)	US #11	27 July 2017	Budapest	
4	24	7:43.77	Summer McIntosh (1:55.74); Rebecca Smith (1:57.30); Kayla Sanchez (1:55.59); Penny Oleksiak (1:55.14)	Canada	29 July 2021	Tokyo	
	25	7:43.86	Madison Wilson (1:56.74); Leah Neale (1:55.27); Kiah Melverton (1:55.91); Mollie O'Callaghan (1:55.94)	Australia #9	22 June 2022	Budapest	
5		7:45.51	Joanne Jackson (1:55.98); Jazmin Carlin (1:56.78); Caitlin McClatchey (1:56.42); Rebecca Adlington (1:56.33)	Great Britain	30 July 2009	Rome	
6		7:46.57	Renata Fabiola Spagnolo (1:58.79); Alessia Filippi (1:56.97); Alice Carpanese (1:57.36); Federica Pellegrini (1:53.45)	Italy	30 July 2009	Rome	
7		7:47.49	Camille Muffat (1:55.51); Charlotte Bonnet (1:57.78); Ophélie-Cyrielle Étienne (1:58.05); Coralie Balmy (1:56.15)	France	1 August 2012	London	
8		7:48.04	Ágnes Mutina (1:56.64); Evelyn Verrasztó (1:57.20); Eszter Dara (1:59.04); Katinka Hosszú (1:55.16)	Hungary	30 July 2009	Rome	
9		7:48.25	Anna Egorova (1:58.19); Anastasia Guzhenkova (1:56.43); Valeriya Salamatina (1:56.93); Veronika Andrusenko (1:56.70)	Russia	25 July 2019	Gwangju	
10		7:48.96	Chihiro Igarashi (1:57.88); Rikako Ikee (1:54.69); Rio Shirai (1:58.29); Yui Ohashi (1:58.10)	Japan	10 August 2018	Tokyo	

=== Women short course ===
- Correct as of September 2026

Nat.#	Perf.#	Time	Athletes	Team	Date	Place	Ref.
1	1	7:30.13	Alex Walsh (1:53.25); Paige Madden (1:53.18); Katie Grimes (1:53.39); Claire Weinstein (1:50.31)	United States	12 December 2024	Budapest	
2	2	7:30.87	Madison Wilson (1:53.13); Mollie O'Callaghan (1:52.83); Leah Neale (1:52.67); Lani Pallister (1:52.24)	Australia	14 December 2022	Melbourne	
3	3	7:32.85	Inge Dekker (1:54.73); Femke Heemskerk (1:51.22); Ranomi Kromowidjojo (1:54.17); Sharon van Rouwendaal (1:52.73)	Netherlands	3 December 2014	Doha	
4	4	7:32.96	Summer McIntosh (1:54.30); Kayla Sanchez (1:52.97); Katerine Savard (1:54.01); Rebecca Smith (1:51.68)	Canada	20 December 2021	Abu Dhabi	
5	5	7:33.39	Nikolett Pádár (1:52.81); Panna Ugrai (1:52.59); Dóra Molnár (1:55.39); Lilla Minna Ábrahám (1:52.60)	Hungary	12 December 2024	Budapest	
	6	7:33.60	Leah Neale (1:52.79); Elizabeth Dekkers (1:54.96); Milla Jansen (1:54.01); Lani Pallister (1:51.84)	Australia #2	12 December 2024	Budapest	
	7	7:33.89	Katerine Savard (1:55.53); Taylor Ruck (1:51.69); Kennedy Goss (1:54.62); Penny Oleksiak (1:52.05)	Canada #2	10 December 2016	Windsor	
6	8	7:34.08	Li Bingjie (1:54.56); Yang Junxuan (1:53.06); Zhang Yuhan (1:53.94); Wang Jianjiahe (1:52.52)	China	15 December 2018	Hangzhou	
	9	7:34.47	Rebecca Smith (1:52.15); Katerine Savard (1:54.78); Mary-Sophie Harvey (1:54.81); Taylor Ruck (1:52.73)	Canada #3	14 December 2022	Melbourne	
	10	7:34.70	Alex Walsh (1:53.90); Hali Flickinger (1:53.48); Erin Gemmell (1:52.23); Leah Smith (1:55.09)	US #2	14 December 2022	Melbourne	
	11	7:35.30	Leah Smith (1:55.85); Mallory Comerford (1:53.00); Melanie Margalis (1:53.59); Erika Brown (1:52.86)	US #3	15 December 2018	Hangzhou	
	12	7:35.94	Chen Qian (1:54.73); Tang Yi (1:53.54); Liu Jing (1:53.59); Zhu Qianwei (1:54.08)	China #2	15 December 2010	Dubai	
	13	7:36.40	Ariarne Titmus (1:52.22); Minna Atherton (1:54.73); Carla Buchanan (1:54.82); Abbey Harkin (1:54.63)	Australia #3	15 December 2018	Hangzhou	
	14	7:36.53	Torri Huske (1:54.72); Abbey Weitzeil (1:54.31); Melanie Margalis (1:54.83); Paige Madden (1:52.67)	US #4	20 December 2021	Abu Dhabi	
7	15	7:36.64	Anna Egorova (1:54.18); Daria Mullakaeva (1:55.22); Anastasia Guzhenkova (1:53.94); Veronika Andrusenko (1:53.30)	Russia	15 December 2018	Hangzhou	
	16	7:36.68	Daria Trofimova (1:54.13); Milana Stepanova (1:53.94); Daria Klepikova (1:51.94); Kseniia Misharina (1:56.67)	Russia #2 (Note: Competed for Neutral Athletes B team.)	12 December 2024	Budapest	
	17	7:37.02	Qiu Yuhan (1:53.26); Cao Yue (1:54.48); Guo Junjun (1:55.14); Shen Duo (1:54.14)	China #3	3 December 2014	Doha	
	18	7:37.57	Blair Evans (1:54.87); Jade Neilsen (1:54.87); Kelly Stubbins (1:55.41); Kylie Palmer (1:52.42)	Australia #4	15 December 2010	Dubai	
8	19	7:38.33	Camille Muffat (1:53.17); Coralie Balmy (1:53.71); Mylène Lazare (1:56.24); Ophélie Etienne (1:55.21)	France	15 December 2010	Dubai	
	20	7:38.42	Katie Hoff (1:53.37); Dagny Knutson (1:56.15); Missy Franklin (1:55.30); Dana Vollmer (1:53.60)	US #5	15 December 2010	Dubai	
	21	7:38.59	Leah Neale (1:54.15); Madison Wilson (1:54.37); Brianna Throssell (1:56.80); Kylie Palmer (1:53.27)	Australia #5	3 December 2014	Doha	
	22	7:38.65	Leah Smith (1:54.87); Mallory Comerford (1:55.32); Sarah Gibson (1:55.43); Madisyn Cox (1:55.03)	US #6	10 December 2016	Windsor	
	23	7:38.90	Inge Dekker (1:55.36); Femke Heemskerk (1:53.44); Marleen Veldhuis (1:54.17); Ranomi Kromowidjojo (1:55.93)	Netherlands #2	10 April 2008	Manchester	
9	24	7:38.96	Joanne Jackson (1:54.78); Melanie Marshall (1:55.83); Caitlin McClatchey (1:54.64); Rebecca Adlington (1:53.71)	Great Britain	10 April 2008	Manchester	
	25	7:39.01	Bronte Barratt (1:57.30); Angie Bainbridge (1:53.88); Kelly Stubbins (1:55.29); Kylie Palmer (1:52.54)	Australia #6	10 April 2008	Manchester	
10		7:41.46	Sofia Morini (1:55.90); Giulia D'Innocenzo (1:54.19); Matilde Biagiotti (1:55.81); Anna Chiara Mascolo (1:55.56)	Italy	12 December 2024	Budapest	

== Olympic champions ==
=== Men ===
Edition	Winner	Time	Notes	Ref.
(United Kingdom) London 1908	Great Britain	10:55.6	(Note: Great Britain set a world record of 10:53.4 in the semifinals.)	
(Sweden) Stockholm 1912	Australasia	10:11.2	WR	
(Belgium) Antwerp 1920	United States	10:04.4	WR	
(France) Paris 1924	United States	9:53.4	WR	
(Netherlands) Amsterdam 1928	United States	9:36.2	WR	
(United States) Los Angeles 1932	Japan	8:58.4	WR	
(Nazi Germany) Berlin 1936	Japan	8:51.5	WR	
(United Kingdom) London 1948	United States	8:46.0	WR	
(Finland) Helsinki 1952	United States	8:31.1	WR	
(Australia) Melbourne 1956	Australia	8:23.6	WR	
(Italy) Rome 1960	United States	8:10.2	WR	
(Japan) Tokyo 1964	United States	7:52.1	WR	
Mexico City 1968	United States	7:52.3		
(West Germany) Munich 1972	United States	7:35.78	WR	
(Canada) Montreal 1976	United States	7:23.22	WR	
(Soviet Union) Moscow 1980	Soviet Union	7:23.50		
(United States) Los Angeles 1984	United States	7:15.69	WR	
(South Korea) Seoul 1988	United States	7:12.51	WR	
(Spain) Barcelona 1992	Unified Team	7:11.95	WR	
(United States) Atlanta 1996	United States	7:14.84		
(Australia) Sydney 2000	Australia	7:07.05	WR	
(Greece) Athens 2004	United States	7:07.33		
(China) Beijing 2008	United States	6:58.56	WR	
(United Kingdom) London 2012	United States	6:59.70		
(Brazil) Rio de Janeiro 2016	United States	7:00.66		
(Japan) Tokyo 2020	Great Britain	6:58.58		
(France) Paris 2024	Great Britain	6:59.43		

=== Women ===
Edition	Winner	Time	Notes	Ref.
(United States) Atlanta 1996	United States	7:59.87	OR	
(Australia) Sydney 2000	United States	7:57.80	OR	
(Greece) Athens 2004	United States	7:53.42	WR	
(China) Beijing 2008	Australia	7:44.31	WR	
(United Kingdom) London 2012	United States	7:42.92	OR	
(Brazil) Rio de Janeiro 2016	United States	7:43.03		
(Japan) Tokyo 2020	China	7:40.33	WR	
(France) Paris 2024	Australia	7:38.08	OR	

== World champions (long course) ==
=== Men ===
Edition	Winner	Time	Notes	Ref.
(Socialist Federal Republic of Yugoslavia) Belgrade 1973	United States (USA)	7:33.22	WR	
(Colombia) Cali 1975	West Germany (FRG)	7:39.44		
(West Germany) West Berlin 1978	United States (USA)	7:20.82	WR	
(Ecuador) Guayaquil 1982	United States (USA)	7:21.09		
(Spain) Madrid 1986	East Germany (GDR)	7:15.91	CR	
(Australia) Perth 1991	Germany (GER)	7:13.50	CR	
(Italy) Rome 1994	Sweden (SWE)	7:17.74		
(Australia) Perth 1998	Australia (AUS)	7:12.48	CR	
(Japan) Fukuoka 2001	Australia (AUS)	7:04.66	WR	
(Spain) Barcelona 2003	Australia (AUS)	7:08.58		
(Canada) Montreal 2005	United States (USA)	7:05.75		
(Australia) Melbourne 2007	United States (USA)	7:03.24	WR	
(Italy) Rome 2009	United States (USA)	6:58.55	WR	
(China) Shanghai 2011	United States (USA)	7:02.67		
(Spain) Barcelona 2013	United States (USA)	7:01.72		
(Russia) Kazan 2015	Great Britain (GBR)	7:04.33		
(Hungary) Budapest 2017	Great Britain (GBR)	7:01.70		
(South Korea) Gwangju 2019	Australia (AUS)	7:00.85		
(Hungary) Budapest 2022	United States (USA)	7:00.24		
(Japan) Fukuoka 2023	Great Britain (GBR)	6:59.08		
(Qatar) Doha 2024	China (CHN)	7:01.84		
Singapore 2025	Great Britain (GBR)	6:59.84		

=== Women ===
Edition	Winner	Time	Notes	Ref.
(Spain) Madrid 1986	East Germany (GDR)	7:59.33	WR	
(Australia) Perth 1991	Germany (GER)	8:02.56		
(Italy) Rome 1994	China (CHN)	7:57.96	CR	
(Australia) Perth 1998	Germany (GER)	8:01.46		
(Japan) Fukuoka 2001	Great Britain (GBR)	7:58.69		
(Spain) Barcelona 2003	United States (USA)	7:55.70	CR	
(Canada) Montreal 2005	United States (USA)	7:53.70	CR	
(Australia) Melbourne 2007	United States (USA)	7:50.09	WR	
(Italy) Rome 2009	China (CHN)	7:42.08	WR	
(China) Shanghai 2011	United States (USA)	7:46.14		
(Spain) Barcelona 2013	United States (USA)	7:45.14		
(Russia) Kazan 2015	United States (USA)	7:45.37		
(Hungary) Budapest 2017	United States (USA)	7:43.39		
(South Korea) Gwangju 2019	Australia (AUS)	7:41.50	WR	
(Hungary) Budapest 2022	United States (USA)	7:41.45	CR	
(Japan) Fukuoka 2023	Australia (AUS)	7:37.50	WR	
(Qatar) Doha 2024	China (CHN)	7:47.26		
Singapore 2025	Australia (AUS)	7:39.35		

== World champions (short course) ==
=== Men ===
Edition	Winner	Time	Notes	Ref.
(Spain) Palma de Mallorca 1993	Sweden (SWE)	7:05.92	CR	
(Brazil) Rio de Janeiro 1995	Australia (AUS)	7:07.97		
(Sweden) Gothenburg 1997	Australia (AUS)	7:02.74	WR	
Hong Kong 1999	Netherlands (NED)	7:04.48		
(Greece) Athens 2000	United States (USA)	7:01.33	WR	
(Russia) Moscow 2002	Australia (AUS)	7:00.36	CR	
(United States) Indianapolis 2004	United States (USA)	7:03.71		
(China) Shanghai 2006	Italy (ITA)	6:59.08	CR	
(United Kingdom) Manchester 2008	Australia (AUS)	6:55.65	CR	
(United Arab Emirates) Dubai 2010	Russia (RUS)	6:49.04	WR	
(Turkey) Istanbul 2012	United States (USA)	6:51.40		
(Qatar) Doha 2014	United States (USA)	6:51.68		
(Canada) Windsor 2016	United States (USA)	6:53.34	(Note: Russia initially won the event, but was disqualified in 2022 after one of the relay members was found guilty of a doping violation.)	
(China) Hangzhou 2018	Brazil (BRA)	6:46.81	WR	
(United Arab Emirates) Abu Dhabi 2021	United States (USA)	6:47.00		
(Australia) Melbourne 2022	United States (USA)	6:44.12	WR	
(Hungary) Budapest 2024	United States (USA)	6:40.51	WR	

=== Women ===
Edition	Winner	Time	Notes	Ref.
(Spain) Palma de Mallorca 1993	China (CHN)	7:52.45	WR	
(Brazil) Rio de Janeiro 1995	Canada (CAN)	7:58.25		
(Sweden) Gothenburg 1997	China (CHN)	7:51.92	WR	
Hong Kong 1999	Sweden (SWE)	7:51.70	WR	
(Greece) Athens 2000	Great Britain (GBR)	7:49.11	WR	
(Russia) Moscow 2002	China (CHN)	7:46.30	WR	
(United States) Indianapolis 2004	United States (USA)	7:47.72		
(China) Shanghai 2006	Australia (AUS)	7:46.96		
(United Kingdom) Manchester 2008	Netherlands (NED)	7:38.90	WR	
(United Arab Emirates) Dubai 2010	China (CHN)	7:35.94	WR	
(Turkey) Istanbul 2012	United States (USA)	7:39.25		
(Qatar) Doha 2014	Netherlands (NED)	7:32.85	WR	
(Canada) Windsor 2016	Canada (CAN)	7:33.89		
(China) Hangzhou 2018	China (CHN)	7:34.08		
(United Arab Emirates) Abu Dhabi 2021	Canada (CAN)	7:32.96		
(Australia) Melbourne 2022	Australia (AUS)	7:30.87	WR	
(Hungary) Budapest 2024	United States (USA)	7:30.13	WR	
