= Makoto Fukui =

Japanese swimmer

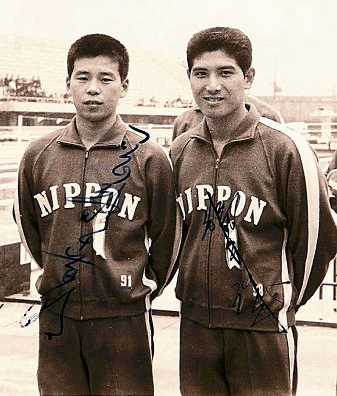
- Makoto Fukui (right) in 1964

Personal information
- Born: February 28, 1940 Shimane Prefecture, Empire of Japan
- Died: October 18, 1992 (aged 52)
- Height: 1.70 m (5 ft 7 in)
- Weight: 71 kg (157 lb)

Sport
- Sport: Swimming
Medal record
Representing Japan
Olympic Games
| Silver medal – second place | 1960 Rome | 4×200 m freestyle |
| Bronze medal – third place | 1964 Tokyo | 4×200 m freestyle |
Asian Games
| Gold medal – first place | 1958 Tokyo | 200 m freestyle |
| Gold medal – first place | 1958 Tokyo | 4×200 m freestyle |
Summer Universiade
| Bronze medal – third place | 1961 Sofia | 100 m freestyle |
| Silver medal – second place | 1963 Porto Alegre | 100 m freestyle |

Makoto Fukui (福井 誠, Fukui Makoto; February 28, 1940 – October 18, 1992) was a Japanese freestyle swimmer. He was part of the Japanese teams that won Olympic medals in 1960 and 1964, and set three world records in the 4 × 200 m freestyle relay in 1959 and 1963. At the 1960 Olympics Fukui also reached the final of the individual 400 m event. He was the flag bearer for Japan at the 1964 Olympics.
