= Georgi Kulikov (swimmer) =

Latvian swimmer (born 1947)

Personal information
- Born: June 11, 1947 (age 79)

Sport
- Sport: Swimming
Medal record
Representing the Soviet Union
Olympic Games
Silver medal – second place	1968 Mexico City	4x100 m freestyle relay
Bronze medal – third place	1968 Mexico City	4x200 m freestyle relay
Bronze medal – third place	1972 Munich	4x200 m freestyle relay
European Championships
Gold medal – first place	1970 Barcelona	4x1100m freestyle relay
Silver medal – second place	1966 Utrecht	4x100m freestyle relay
Silver medal – second place	1970 Barcelona	4x200m freestyle relay
Silver medal – second place	1974 Vienna	4x100m freestyle relay
Silver medal – second place	1974 Vienna	4x200m freestyle relay
Bronze medal – third place	1970 Barcelona	100m freestyle
Bronze medal – third place	1970 Barcelona	200m freestyle

Georgi Kulikov (born 11 June 1947) is a Latvian former butterfly and freestyle swimmer. He competed in freestyle relays for the USSR in the 1968 Summer Olympics and in the 1972 Summer Olympics, winning three medals.
