= John Nelson (swimmer) =

American swimmer (born 1948)

Personal information
- Full name: John Maurer Nelson
- National team: United States
- Born: June 8, 1948 (age 78) Chicago, Illinois, U.S.
- Height: 5 ft 10 in (1.78 m)
- Weight: 146 lb (66 kg)

Sport
- Sport: Swimming
- Strokes: Freestyle
- Club: Arden Hills Swim Club
- College team: Yale University
- Coach: Sherm Chavoor; Phil Moriarty
Medal record
Men's swimming
Representing the United States
Olympic Games
Gold medal – first place	1968 Mexico City	4x200 m freestyle
Silver medal – second place	1964 Tokyo	1500 m freestyle
Bronze medal – third place	1968 Mexico City	200 m freestyle
Summer Universiade
Gold medal – first place	1967 Tokyo	4x200 m freestyle

John Maurer Nelson (born June 8, 1948) is an American former competition swimmer for Yale University, a 1964 Olympic medalist, a 1968 Olympic champion, and a former world record-holder.

Nelson was born in Chicago, Illinois, and attended Pompano Beach High School in Pompano Beach, Florida. In the summer of 1967, Nelson trained with the Jack Nelson Swim Club in Fort Lauderdale. Prior to 1967, he trained with Bob Ousley of the Fort Lauderdale Swimming Association. From 1962-1964, he won the Florida State Championship in the 100 and 200 freestyle events for three successive years, swimming them in record times. In 1964, he helped lead Pompano Beach to a state championship in swimming.

== 1964 Tokyo Olympics ==
As a 16-year old High School Junior at the 1964 Olympic Games in Tokyo, Japan, Nelson received a silver medal for his second-place finish in the men's 1,500-meter freestyle finishing with a time of 17:03.0. Nelson trailed the first and second place swimmers throughout the race, but came on strong at 1350-meters catching American Alan Wood who was second to Australian Bob Windle. Though he finished close, Nelson was unable to catch Windle, who won the event.

=== Yale ===
Nelson enrolled in Yale University, around 1966, where he swam for coach Phil Moriarty's Yale Bulldogs swimming and diving team, which included other Olympic-caliber swimmers such as Don Schollander. Nelson missed much of his Freshman swimming year from illness.

As a Sophomore at Yale in April 1968, Nelson looked forward to the Mexico City Olympics, but realized how much tougher the competition would be to make the U.S. team. He worked for Yale's newspaper as a photographer, and had a good year as a swimmer in 1968, with Yale taking a second place finish to Indiana University at the NCAA Championship that year. At the 1968 NCAA's Nelson swam on Yale's winning 400 and 800-yard freestyle relay teams, and took a fourth place in the 500 with a time of 4:39.76. He trained for the 68 Olympics with Sherm Chavore's Arden Hills Swim Club. For the 1968 Olympics, he was trained by Hall of Fame Coach Sherm Chavoor at the Arden Hills Swim Club in Sacramento, as were fellow 1968 U.S. team swimming Olympians Mark Spitz, Mark J. Burton, John Ferris and Sue Peterson. Chavoor was one of the early coaches to challenge elite swimmers with "overdistance training", which focused on workouts that gave more total yardage and semi-frequent mid-range and longer distance intervals to build greater endurance and speed.

== 1968 Mexico City Olympics ==
Nelson qualified at the trials and subsequently competed at the 1968 Olympic Games in Mexico City, where he received a gold medal in the men's 4×200-meter freestyle relay beside his teammates Stephen Rerych, Mark Spitz and Schollander. Despite having the talents of Mark Spitz and Don Schollander on the team, the high altitude led the American team to underperform expectations, barely taking the gold with a combined time of 7:52.3, just 1.4 seconds ahead of second place Australia.

In individual competition, Nelson received the bronze medal for his third-place finish in the men's 200-meter freestyle with a time of 1:58.1.

=== World record 400-meter ===
Nelson improved the world record on the 400-meter freestyle (long course) on August 18, 1966 (4:11.8), only to be beaten by Don Schollander, both a Yale and U.S. Olympic teammate, on the same day (4:11.6).

In 1985, Nelson was practicing medicine in Salt Lake City, Utah.

== See also ==
- List of Olympic medalists in swimming (men)
- List of Yale University people
- World record progression 400 metres freestyle
