= László Szlamka =

Hungarian swimmer

Personal information
- Nationality: Hungarian
- Born: 18 September 1943 (age 82) Budapest, Hungary

Sport
- Sport: Swimming

László Szlamka (born 18 September 1943) is a Hungarian former swimmer. He competed in two events at the 1964 Summer Olympics.
