= Vladimir Berezin =

Russian swimmer

Personal information
- Nationality: Russian
- Born: 19 January 1941 (age 85)

Sport
- Sport: Swimming

Vladimir Berezin (born 19 January 1941) is a Russian former swimmer. He competed in two events at the 1964 Summer Olympics for the Soviet Union.
