= Alfred Müller (swimmer) =

East German swimmer

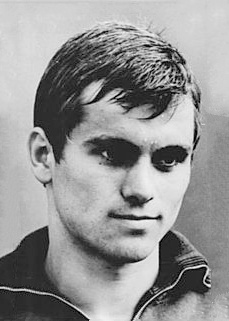
- Müller in 1968

Personal information
- Born: 16 June 1948 (age 78) Gera, Germany
- Height: 1.75 m (5 ft 9 in)
- Weight: 70 kg (154 lb)

Sport
- Sport: Swimming
- Club: ASK Vorwärts Rostock
Medal record
Representing East Germany
European Championships
Silver medal – second place	1966 Utrecht	4×200 m freestyle

Alfred Müller (born 16 June 1948) is a retired East German swimmer. He won a silver medal in the 4×200 m freestyle relay at the 1966 European Aquatics Championships. Two years later his team finished seventh in this event at the 1968 Summer Olympics.
