= Don Schollander =

American swimmer (born 1946)

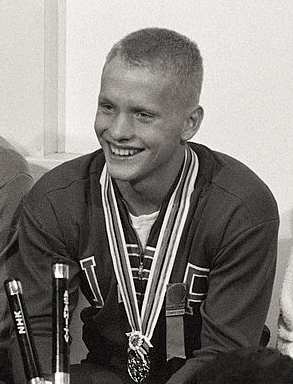
- Schollander at the 1964 Olympics

Personal information
- Full name: Donald Arthur Schollander
- Nickname: "Don"
- National team: United States
- Born: April 30, 1946 (age 80) Charlotte, North Carolina, U.S.
- Home town: Lake Oswego, Oregon, U.S.
- Height: 5 ft 11 in (1.80 m)
- Weight: 174 lb (79 kg)

Sport
- Sport: Swimming
- Strokes: Freestyle
- Club: Santa Clara Swim Club
- College team: Yale College
- Coach: George Haines (Santa Clara)
Medal record
Men's swimming
Representing the United States
Olympic Games
| Gold medal – first place | 1964 Tokyo | 100 m freestyle |
| Gold medal – first place | 1964 Tokyo | 400 m freestyle |
| Gold medal – first place | 1964 Tokyo | 4×100 m freestyle |
| Gold medal – first place | 1964 Tokyo | 4×200 m freestyle |
| Gold medal – first place | 1968 Mexico City | 4×200 m freestyle |
| Silver medal – second place | 1968 Mexico City | 200 m freestyle |
Pan American Games
| Gold medal – first place | 1967 Winnipeg | 200 m freestyle |
| Gold medal – first place | 1967 Winnipeg | 4×100 m freestyle |
| Gold medal – first place | 1967 Winnipeg | 4×200 m freestyle |
| Silver medal – second place | 1963 São Paulo | 400 m freestyle |

Donald Arthur Schollander (born April 30, 1946) is an American former competition swimmer, five-time Olympic champion, and former world record-holder in four events. He won a total of five gold medals and one silver medal at the 1964 and 1968 Summer Olympics. With four gold medals, he was the most successful athlete at the 1964 Olympics.

== Early career ==
Schollander was born in Charlotte, North Carolina, and learned competitive swimming from his uncle, Newt Perry, who ran a swimming school in Florida. As a boy, Schollander moved with his family to Lake Oswego, Oregon. Although his first sporting passion was football, he was too small to compete in high school football. Instead, he joined Lake Oswego High School's swim team, and in 1960, helped lead the team to an Oregon state swimming championship as a freshman.

== Olympics ==
As a teenager in 1962, Schollander moved to Santa Clara, California to train under legendary swim coach George Haines of the Santa Clara Swim Club. Two years later at the age of 18, he won three freestyle events at the AAU national championships. He made the U.S. Olympic team in two individual events and two relays. Months later, he won four gold medals and set three world records at the 1964 Summer Olympics, at the time the most medals won by an American since Jesse Owens in 1936. His success helped earn him the James E. Sullivan Award as the top amateur athlete in the United States, and the AP Athlete of the Year, defeating runner-up Johnny Unitas by a wide margin. He was also named ABC's Wide World of Sports Athlete of the Year.

Schollander appeared on an episode of To Tell the Truth immediately after winning his four gold medals.

In his biography, Schollander attributes a temporary decline in his endurance, technique, and speed after the 1964 Olympics as a result of time away from training while he recovered from mononucleosis, the shorter workout distances he swam at Yale as opposed to the distances he swam in high school at Santa Clara under George Haines, the absence of top competitors competing against him while he swam at Yale, and a short bout with Asian Flu. With the help of George Haines's coaching in Santa Clara in the summer of 1965, Schollander believed he recovered much of his prior speed and endurance.

== College and Olympic swimming ==
Schollander attended Yale College where he was a member of Skull and Bones, a secret society, and the Delta Kappa Epsilon (Phi chapter) fraternity. He was the captain of Yale's swim team, winning three individual NCAA championships. At the 1968 Summer Olympics, Schollander won another gold medal in the 4×200-meter freestyle relay, but finished second in the 200-meter freestyle, the event that Schollander had considered to be his best. This was the first Olympics in which 200-meter swimming events were part of the competition.

Following the 1968 Olympics, Schollander retired from competitive swimming.

== After swimming ==
Schollander was inducted into the International Swimming Hall of Fame at age 19 in 1965. In 1983, he was one of the first group of inductees into the U.S. Olympic Hall of Fame. He is also a member of Oregon Sports Hall of Fame.

In 1971, he published his first book, Deep Water (with Duke Savage) chronicling his swimming, his teammates and coaches, and the behind-the-scenes politics of international swimming, especially the Olympic Games. He followed this book in 1974 with Inside Swimming (with Joel H. Cohen).

Schollander and his wife Cheryl reside in Lake Oswego, Oregon, where he runs Schollander Development, a real estate development company. His gold medals are on display to the public at a Bank of America branch location in downtown Lake Oswego. Schollander has three children, Jeb, Kyle, and Katie.

== See also ==
- List of multiple Olympic gold medalists
- List of multiple Olympic gold medalists at a single Games
- List of Olympic medalists in swimming (men)
- List of Yale University people
- World record progression 200 metres freestyle
- World record progression 400 metres freestyle
- World record progression 4 × 100 metres freestyle relay
- World record progression 4 × 200 metres freestyle relay

== Bibliography ==
- Schollander, Don, and Duke Savage, Deep Water, Pelham Books (1971). ISBN 978-0720705423.
- Schollander, Don, and Joel H. Cohen, Inside Swimming, Contemporary Books (1974). ISBN 978-0809289066.

Records
| Preceded by Takashi Ishimoto; Bob Windle; Hans-Joachim Klein | Men's 200-meter freestyle world record-holder (long course); August 11, 1962 – April 21, 1963; July 27, 1963 – May 24, 1964; August 1, 1964 – July 12, 1969 | Succeeded by Bob Windle; Hans-Joachim Klein; Mark Spitz |
| Preceded by Murray Rose; John Nelson | Men's 400-meter freestyle world record-holder (long course); July 31, 1964 – August 18, 1966; August 18, 1966 – August 25, 1966 | Succeeded by John Nelson; Frank Wiegand |
