= Gérard Letast =

French swimmer

Personal information
- Born: 28 January 1949 (age 77) Verdun, France

Sport
- Sport: Swimming

Gérard Letast (born 28 January 1949) is a French former swimmer. He competed in two events at the 1968 Summer Olympics.
