= Yevgeny Novikov =

Russian swimmer (born 1945)

Personal information
- Born: 1 February 1945 (age 81) Moscow, Russia
- Height: 1.78 m (5 ft 10 in)
- Weight: 79 kg (174 lb)

Sport
- Sport: Swimming
- Club: Dynamo Moscow
Medal record
Men's swimming
Representing Soviet Union
European Championships
Gold medal – first place	1966 Utrecht	4×200 m freestyle

Yevgeny Mikhaylovich Novikov (Russian: Евгений Михайлович Новиков; born 1 February 1945) is a retired Russian swimmer who won a gold medal at the 1966 European Aquatics Championships in the 4 × 200 m freestyle relay. He finished seventh in the same event at the 1964 Summer Olympics. Between 1963 and 1965 he won five national titles and set five national records in individual and relay freestyle events.
