= Phil Moriarty =

Swimming and diving coach (1914–2012)

- Moriarty, 1964

Biographical details
- Born: April 12, 1914; New Haven, Connecticut
- Died: August 18, 2012 (aged 98); Mystic, Connecticut

Coaching career (HC unless noted)
- 1939-1959: Yale University Asst. Swim Coach
- 1959-1976: Yale University Head Swim and Diving Coach
- 1960: US Olympic Team, Rome; Diving Coach

Head coaching record
- Overall: 195 Won 25 Lost; Winning Percentage- .866

Accomplishments and honors

Championships
- 11 Eastern Intercollegiate Swim League Championships; 9 Eastern Seaboard Titles

Awards
- Fred Cady Diving Coaches Award '74; International Swim. Hall of Fame; NCAA Coach of the Year (1971)

Phil Moriarty (April 12, 1914 – August 18, 2012) was a swimming and diving coach from the United States. He coached at Yale University for 37 years, from 1939-1976, and served as a diving coach for the U.S. team at the 1960 Rome Summer Olympics.

Moriarty was born in New Haven, Connecticut on April 12, 1914, graduating from High School in 1932. Though he did not graduate college, he soon obtained a job teaching swimming to Yale College students around his age.

== Swim and dive coach, Yale ==
While at Yale, Moriarty served as an assistant coach to Robert Kiphuth, beginning in 1939, up-to Kiphuth's retirement in 1959, at which point Moriarty replaced Kiphuth as Yale's head coach, serving for seventeen years until 1976. Bob Kiphuth had been a legendary Yale Coach, serving 40 years, and achieving a record of 528-13. He had emphasized technique, muscle building and dry-land training and had produced a wealth of Olympic champions. He was a difficult act to follow, but Moriarty became a fitting replacement.

Moriarty won 11 Eastern Intercollegiate Swim League Championships and 9 Eastern Seaboard Titles. In his career at Yale, he amassed an overall record as Head Coach of 195-25. He faced challenges recruiting, since as a Division III school, Yale could not offer swimming scholarships to prospective students which gave an advantage to many competing teams.

== Olympians ==
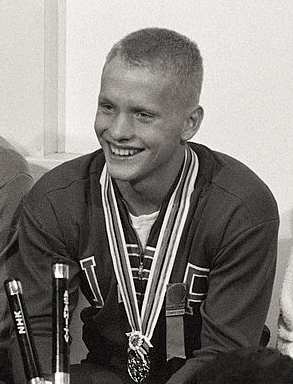
Don Schollander '64 Tokyo Olympics

Among the athletes Moriarty coached were five-time Olympic gold medalist Don Schollander, 1964 Olympic gold medalist Mike Austin, three-time 1964 Olympic Gold medalist Steve Clark, 1964 and 1968 Olympic medalist John Nelson and two-time 1960 Olympic gold medalist Jeff Farrell. He coached seventh place 200-meter 1968 Olympic breast stroke competitor Philip Long. He also coached Olympic medalist divers Bob Clotworthy and David Browning. They led the U.S. diving team in the 1960 Rome Olympics that won two gold and four silver medals.

== Swimming community service ==
He served as chairman of the NCAA Rules Committee for both Diving (1953–57) and Swimming (1959-62). After retiring as a coach, he wrote instructional books and made films for swimmers and divers. In 1960, he published his book Springboard Diving, and in 1970 followed with the Father and Son Swimming Book.

He designed a revolutionary new starting block for backstrokers so they would not have to push off a wet, slippery wall. Though his new block had success in America, three years later the international federation failed to sanction it. In his spare time he taught swimming and trained lifeguards and waterfront personnel. He spent many summers as a swimming instructor and pool director at St. Louis Country Club.

== Retirement ==
A while after he retired in 1976, he and his wife, formerly Phyllis Brown, spent winters in Florida until her death in 1980. Though he had moved there in 1993, he eventually returned to Connecticut, and lived in Mystic.

== Honors ==
Among the honors he received, Moriarty was inducted into the International Swimming Hall of Fame in 1980, and was inducted in the American Swimming Coaches Association's hall of fame in 2009. He was named the NCAA's Swimming Coach of the Year in 1971.

He lived to the impressive age of 98, and died in Mystic, Connecticut on August 18, 2012.

== See also ==
- List of members of the International Swimming Hall of Fame
