= Hans Rosendahl =

Swedish swimmer (1944–2021)

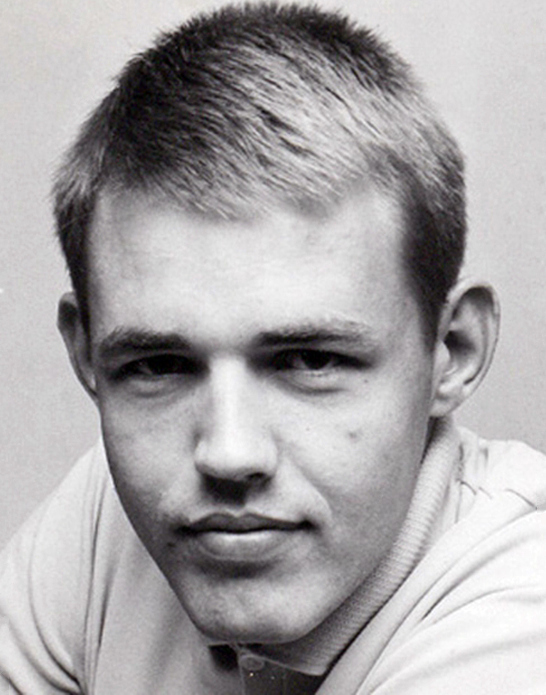
- Rosendahl circa 1964

Personal information
- Full name: Hans Viktor Rosendahl
- Born: 27 December 1944 Katrineholm, Sweden
- Died: 23 November 2021 (aged 76) Katrineholm, Sweden
- Height: 1.87 m (6 ft 2 in)
- Weight: 85 kg (187 lb)

Sport
- Sport: Swimming
- Strokes: Freestyle
- Club: Katrineholms SS
Medal record
Representing Sweden
European Championships
Gold medal – first place	1962 Leipzig	4×200 m freestyle
Silver medal – second place	1962 Leipzig	400 m freestyle

Hans Viktor Rosendahl (27 December 1944 – 23 November 2021) was a Swedish freestyle swimmer. He competed at the 1964 Summer Olympics in the 400 m and 4 × 200 m and finished fifth in the relay. He won a gold and a silver medal in these events at the 1962 European Aquatics Championships.
