= Mats Svensson =

Swedish swimmer

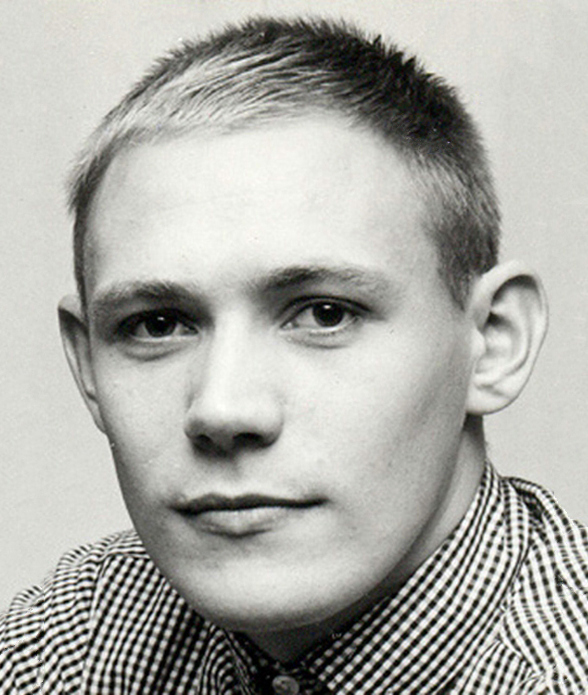

Personal information
- Full name: Mats Gunnar Svensson
- Born: 28 April 1943 (age 83) Borås, Sweden
- Height: 185 cm (6 ft 1 in)
- Weight: 75 kg (165 lb)

Sport
- Sport: Swimming
- Strokes: Freestyle
- Club: IF Elfsborg, Borås
Medal record
Representing Sweden
European Championships
Gold medal – first place	1962 Leipzig	4×200 m freestyle
Bronze medal – third place	1962 Leipzig	4×100 m freestyle

Mats Gunnar Svensson (born 28 April 1943) is a retired Swedish freestyle swimmer. He competed at the 1964 Summer Olympics in the 400 m and 4 × 200 m events and finished fifth in the relay. He won a gold and a bronze medal in the 4 × 100 m and 4 × 200 m relays at the 1962 European Aquatics Championships.
