= Julio Arango =

Colombian swimmer (born 1950)

Personal information
- Born: 6 June 1950 (age 76) Buga, Valle del Cauca, Colombia

Sport
- Sport: Swimming
Medal record
Representing Colombia
Men's swimming
Pan American Games
Bronze medal – third place	1967 Winnipeg	200 m freestyle

Julio Arango (born 6 June 1950) is a Colombian former swimmer. He competed at the 1964 Summer Olympics and the 1968 Summer Olympics. He finished third in the 1967 Pan American Games 200 metres freestyle event.
