= Frank Wiegand =

East German swimmer

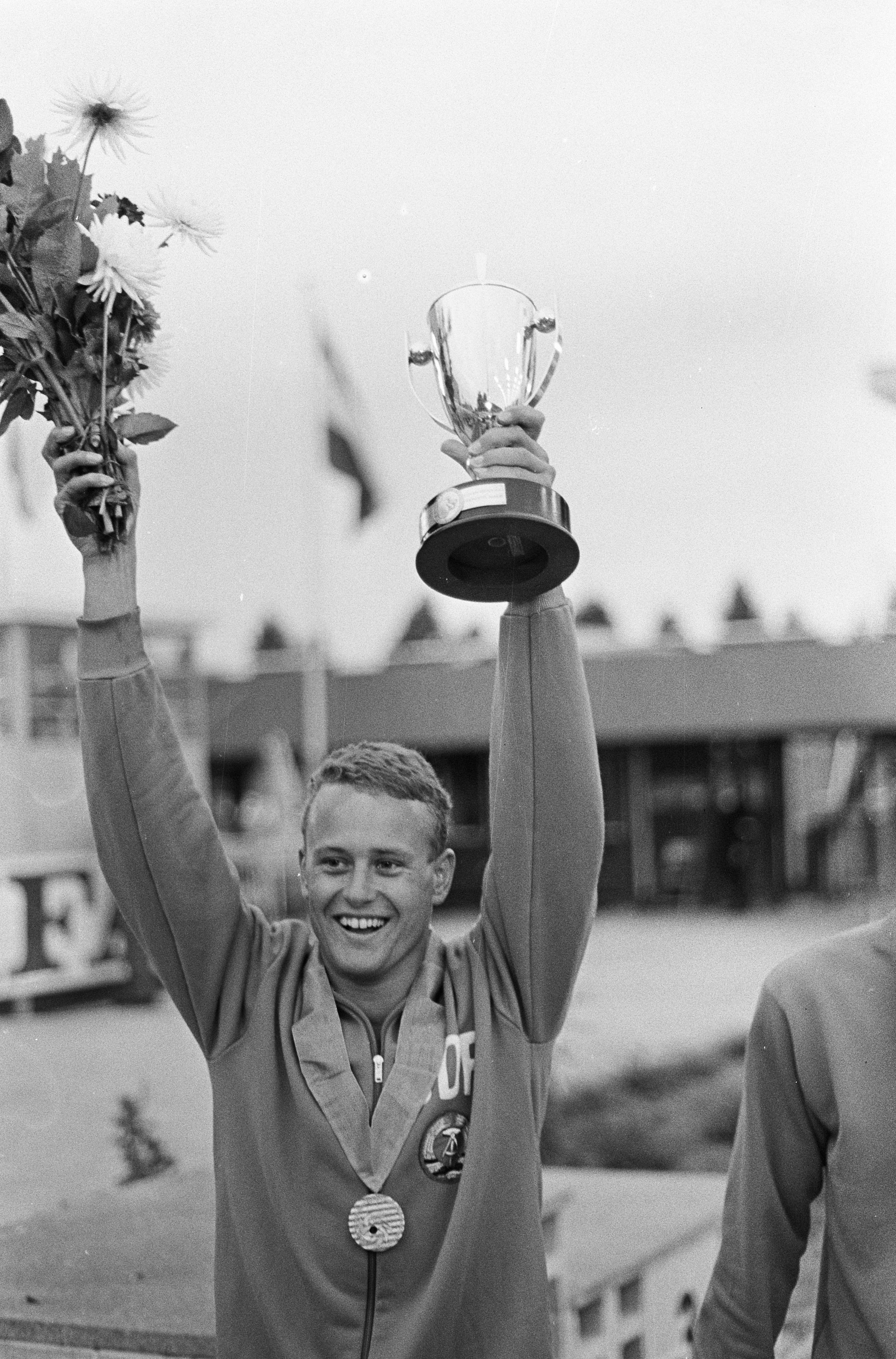
- Frank Wiegand at the 1966 European championships

Personal information
- Born: 15 March 1943 (age 83) Annaberg, Germany
- Height: 1.80 m (5 ft 11 in)
- Weight: 70 kg (154 lb)

Sport
- Sport: Swimming
- Club: SC Einheit Dresden; ASK Vorwärts Rostock
Medal record
Representing Germany
Olympic Games
| Silver medal – second place | 1964 Tokyo | 400 m freestyle |
| Silver medal – second place | 1964 Tokyo | 4×100 m freestyle |
| Silver medal – second place | 1964 Tokyo | 4×200 m freestyle |
Representing East Germany
Olympic Games
| Silver medal – second place | 1968 Mexico City | 4×100 m medley |
European Championships
| Gold medal – first place | 1962 Leipzig | 4×100 m medley |
| Gold medal – first place | 1966 Utrecht | 400 m freestyle |
| Gold medal – first place | 1966 Utrecht | 400 m medley |
| Gold medal – first place | 1966 Utrecht | 4x100 m freestyle |
| Silver medal – second place | 1966 Utrecht | 4x200 m freestyle |
| Silver medal – second place | 1966 Utrecht | 4x100 m medley |
| Bronze medal – third place | 1962 Leipzig | 400 m freestyle |
| Bronze medal – third place | 1962 Leipzig | 4×200 m freestyle |

Frank Wiegand (born 15 March 1943) is a German former swimmer, Olympic medalist and world record holder. He participated in the 1960, 1964 and 1968 Summer Olympics, winning a total of four silver medals.

He won eight medals at two European championships, in 1962 and 1966, including four gold medals in freestyle and medley events. In 1966, he also set a new world record in the 400 metres freestyle and was chosen East German German Sportspersonality of the Year.

Wiegand studied sports science aiming to become a coach, but was redirected to a labour union instead. After the reunification of Germany he worked as a real estate manager at Zeuthen near Berlin.
