= Francis Luyce =

French swimmer (born 1947)

Personal information
- Born: February 13, 1947 (age 79)

Sport
- Sport: Swimming
Medal record
Representing France
Mediterranean Games
Gold medal – first place	1963 Naples	400m freestyle
Gold medal – first place	1963 Naples	4x200m freestyle relay
Silver medal – second place	1963 Naples	1500m freestyle

Francis Luyce (born 13 February 1947) is a French former freestyle swimmer who competed in the 1964 Summer Olympics and in the 1968 Summer Olympics.

== See also ==
- World record progression 800 metres freestyle
