= Aleksandr Paramonov =

Soviet swimmer

Personal information
- Born: 13 March 1942 (age 84) Moscow, USSR
- Height: 1.76 m (5 ft 9 in)
- Weight: 72 kg (159 lb)

Sport
- Sport: Swimming
- Club: Dynamo Moscow

Aleksandr Aleksandrovich Paramonov (Russian: Александр Александрович Парамонов; born 13 March 1942) is a retired Soviet freestyle swimmer. He competed at the 1964 Summer Olympics in the 400 m freestyle and 4 × 200 m freestyle relay and finished seventh in the latter event. During his career he won four national titles, in the 400 m (1962) and 4 × 100 m freestyle disciplines (1961, 1963 and 1965).

He graduated from the Russian State University of Physical Education in Moscow, and after retirement from competitions worked as a swimming coach and instructor in Moscow. He was awarded the Medal "Veteran of Labour".
