= Portugal at the 1964 Summer Olympics =

- IOC code: POR
- NOC: Olympic Committee of Portugal

in Tokyo
- Competitors: 20 in 7 sports
- Flag bearer: Fernando Costa Matos (Judo)
- Officials: 15
- Medals: Gold 0 Silver 0 Bronze 0 Total 0

Summer Olympics appearances (overview)
- 1912; 1920; 1924; 1928; 1932; 1936; 1948; 1952; 1956; 1960; 1964; 1968; 1972; 1976; 1980; 1984; 1988; 1992; 1996; 2000; 2004; 2008; 2012; 2016; 2020; 2024

Portugal competed at the 1964 Summer Olympics in Tokyo, Japan. 20 competitors, 19 men and 1 woman, took part in 20 events in 7 sports.

== Athletics ==
Men's 100m:

- José Fernandes da Rocha – 1st round: 4th (heat G)

Men's 200m:

- José Fernandes da Rocha – 1st round: 5th (heat H)

Men's 1500m:

- Manuel F. Oliveira – 1st round: DNS (heat C)

Men's 3000m Steeplechase:

- Manuel F. Oliveira – 4th (8.36,2)

Men's 5000m:

- Manuel F. Oliveira – 1st round: DNS (heat D)

Men's Marathon:

- Armando Aldegalega – 44th (2:38.02,2)

== Equestrian ==
Men's Individual Jumping:

- Henrique Alves Calado – 34th (−58,25 points)
- Joaquim Duarte Silva – 5th (−20,00 points)

== Gymnastics ==
Women's Individual All-Round Competition:

- Esbela Fonseca – 68th (69,763 points)
  1. Vault – 18,133
  2. Asymmetrical Bars – 16,699
  3. Balance Beam – 17,499
  4. Floor – 17,432

== Judo ==
Men's Middleweight (68 – 80 kg):

- Fernando Costa Matos – 1st round: 2nd (group 8)

== Sailing ==
Finn:

- Hélder de Oliveira – 19th (2591 points)

Star:

- Duarte de Almeida Bello and Fernando Pinto Coelho Bello – 8th (3330 points)

Dragon:

- Joaquim Pinto Basto, Eduardo Guedes de Queiroz and Carlos Ferreira – 16th (1804 points)

== Shooting ==
Four shooters represented Portugal in 1964.

25 m pistol

- José Manuel Carpinteiro – 45th (552 marks)

50 m pistol

- Manuel da Costa – 58th (580 marks)

Trap

- Armando Marques – 18th (188 marks)
- Guy de Valle Flor – 28th (186 marks)

== Swimming ==
Men

Athlete	Event	Heat		Semifinal		Final	
Athlete	Event	Time	Rank	Time	Rank	Time	Rank
Herlander Ribeiro	100 m freestyle	59.0	=57	Did not advance			
Vítor Fonseca	200 m butterfly	2:18.3	21	Did not advance			
António Bessone Basto	400 m individual medley	5:19.7	26	—N/a		Did not advance	

== Officials ==
- Correia Leal (chief of mission)
