= Swimming at the 1988 Summer Olympics – Men's 400 metre individual medley =

Men's 400 metre individual medley at the Games of the XXIV Olympiad
- Venue: Jamsil Indoor Swimming Pool
- Date: 20 September 1988 (heats); 21 September 1988 (finals)
- Competitors: 35 from 25 nations
- Winning time: 4:14.75 WR

Medalists
| 1st place, gold medalist(s) | | Tamás Darnyi | Hungary |
| 2nd place, silver medalist(s) | | David Wharton | United States |
| 3rd place, bronze medalist(s) | | Stefano Battistelli | Italy |

The men's 400 metre individual medley event at the 1988 Summer Olympics took place between 20–21 September at the Jamsil Indoor Swimming Pool in Seoul, South Korea.

== Records ==
Prior to this competition, the existing world and Olympic records were as follows.

| World record | Tamás Darnyi (HUN) | 4:15.42 | Strasbourg, France | 19 August 1987 |
| Olympic record | Alex Baumann (CAN) | 4:17.41 | Los Angeles, United States | 30 July 1984 |

The following records were established during the competition:

| Date | Round | Name | Nation | Time | Record |
|---|---|---|---|---|---|
| 20 September | Heat 5 | Tamás Darnyi | Hungary | 4:16.55 | OR |
| 21 September | Final A | Tamás Darnyi | Hungary | 4:14.75 | WR |

== Results ==
=== Heats ===
Rule: The eight fastest swimmers advance to final A (Q), while the next eight to final B (q).

| Rank | Heat | Name | Nationality | Time | Notes |
|---|---|---|---|---|---|
| 1 | 5 | Tamás Darnyi | Hungary | 4:16.55 | Q, OR |
| 2 | 3 | Patrick Kühl | East Germany | 4:18.60 | Q |
| 3 | 5 | Stefano Battistelli | Italy | 4:20.43 | Q |
| 4 | 4 | David Wharton | United States | 4:20.84 | Q |
| 5 | 4 | József Szabó | Hungary | 4:20.85 | Q |
| 6 | 4 | Jens-Peter Berndt | West Germany | 4:20.93 | Q |
| 7 | 5 | Peter Bermel | West Germany | 4:22.78 | Q |
| 8 | 5 | Luca Sacchi | Italy | 4:23.37 | Q |
| 9 | 3 | Christophe Bordeau | France | 4:23.46 | q |
| 10 | 3 | Jeff Kostoff | United States | 4:24.10 | q |
| 11 | 5 | Jon Kelly | Canada | 4:24.62 | q |
| 12 | 3 | Robert Bruce | Australia | 4:25.15 | q |
| 13 | 3 | Mikhail Zubkov | Soviet Union | 4:25.30 | q |
| 14 | 5 | Rob Woodhouse | Australia | 4:25.60 | q |
| 15 | 5 | Charalambos Papanikolaou | Greece | 4:26.72 | q |
| 16 | 4 | Paul Brew | Great Britain | 4:27.22 | q |
| 17 | 4 | Yoshiyuki Mizumoto | Japan | 4:28.11 | |
| 18 | 3 | Laurent Journet | France | 4:29.03 | |
| 19 | 2 | Ondřej Bureš | Czechoslovakia | 4:29.62 | |
| 20 | 3 | Salvador Vassallo | Puerto Rico | 4:30.37 | |
| 21 | 2 | Javier Careaga | Mexico | 4:30.71 | |
| 22 | 2 | Rui Borges | Portugal | 4:30.79 | |
| 23 | 5 | Michael Meldrum | Canada | 4:31.74 | |
| 24 | 2 | Renato Ramalho | Brazil | 4:31.95 | |
| 25 | 3 | Takahiro Fujimoto | Japan | 4:33.03 | |
| 26 | 2 | Diogo Madeira | Portugal | 4:35.00 | |
| 27 | 4 | Martín López-Zubero | Spain | 4:35.68 | |
| 28 | 2 | Lee Jae-soo | South Korea | 4:40.46 | |
| 29 | 1 | Jonathan Sakovich | Guam | 4:44.78 | |
| 30 | 2 | René Concepcion | Philippines | 4:48.00 | |
| 31 | 1 | Sultan Al-Otaibi | Kuwait | 4:50.16 | |
| 32 | 1 | Julian Bolling | Sri Lanka | 4:53.61 | |
| | 2 | Desmond Koh | Singapore | DSQ | |
| | 4 | John Davey | Great Britain | DSQ | |
| | 4 | Jan Bidrman | Sweden | DNS | |

=== Finals ===
==== Final B ====
| Rank | Lane | Name | Nationality | Time | Notes |
|---|---|---|---|---|---|
| 9 | 5 | Jeff Kostoff | United States | 4:22.95 | |
| 10 | 4 | Christophe Bordeau | France | 4:23.39 | |
| 11 | 6 | Robert Bruce | Australia | 4:24.33 | |
| 12 | 3 | Jon Kelly | Canada | 4:25.02 | |
| 13 | 2 | Mikhail Zubkov | Soviet Union | 4:25.44 | |
| 14 | 7 | Rob Woodhouse | Australia | 4:26.14 | |
| 15 | 8 | Paul Brew | Great Britain | 4:26.77 | |
| 16 | 1 | Charalambos Papanikolaou | Greece | 4:27.95 | |

==== Final A ====
| Rank | Lane | Name | Nationality | Time | Notes |
|---|---|---|---|---|---|
| 1st place, gold medalist(s) | 4 | Tamás Darnyi | Hungary | 4:14.75 | WR |
| 2nd place, silver medalist(s) | 6 | David Wharton | United States | 4:17.36 | |
| 3rd place, bronze medalist(s) | 3 | Stefano Battistelli | Italy | 4:18.01 | |
| 4 | 2 | József Szabó | Hungary | 4:18.15 | |
| 5 | 5 | Patrick Kühl | East Germany | 4:18.44 | |
| 6 | 7 | Jens-Peter Berndt | West Germany | 4:21.71 | |
| 7 | 8 | Luca Sacchi | Italy | 4:23.23 | |
| 8 | 1 | Peter Bermel | West Germany | 4:24.02 | |
