= Swimming at the 1988 Summer Olympics – Men's 200 metre individual medley =

Men's 200 metre individual medley at the Games of the XXIV Olympiad
- Venue: Jamsil Indoor Swimming Pool
- Date: 25 September 1988 (heats & finals)
- Competitors: 58 from 36 nations
- Winning time: 2:00.17 WR

Medalists
1st place, gold medalist(s)		Tamás Darnyi	Hungary
2nd place, silver medalist(s)		Patrick Kühl	East Germany
3rd place, bronze medalist(s)		Vadim Yaroshchuk	Soviet Union

The men's 200 metre individual medley event at the 1988 Summer Olympics took place on 25 September at the Jamsil Indoor Swimming Pool in Seoul, South Korea.

== Records ==
Prior to this competition, the existing world and Olympic records were as follows.

World record	Tamás Darnyi (HUN)	2:00.56	Strasbourg, France	23 August 1987
Olympic record	Alex Baumann (CAN)	2:01.42	Los Angeles, United States	4 August 1984

The following records were established during the competition:

Date	Round	Name	Nation	Time	Record
24 September	Final A	Tamás Darnyi	Hungary	2:00.17	WR

== Results ==
=== Heats ===
Rule: The eight fastest swimmers advance to final A (Q), while the next eight to final B (q).

Rank	Heat	Name	Nationality	Time	Notes
1	8	Tamás Darnyi	Hungary	2:02.15	Q
2	8	Vadim Yaroshchuk	Soviet Union	2:02.77	Q
3	6	Patrick Kühl	East Germany	2:03.77	Q
4	6	Mikhail Zubkov	Soviet Union	2:03.79	Q
5	6	Gary Anderson	Canada	2:04.00	Q
6	8	Raik Hannemann	East Germany	2:04.03	Q
7	8	Peter Bermel	West Germany	2:04.18	Q
8	7	Robert Bruce	Australia	2:04.31	Q
9	7	David Wharton	United States	2:04.64	q
10	7	Jens-Peter Berndt	West Germany	2:04.80	q
11	7	Christophe Bordeau	France	2:04.95	q
12	6	Bill Stapleton	United States	2:05.32	q
13	6	Luca Sacchi	Italy	2:05.45	q
14	7	Charalambos Papanikolaou	Greece	2:05.53	q
15	6	John Davey	Great Britain	2:05.55	q
16	7	Neil Cochran	Great Britain	2:05.56	q
17	8	Rob Woodhouse	Australia	2:05.87	
18	6	Roberto Cassio	Italy	2:05.88	
19	5	Takahiro Fujimoto	Japan	2:07.23	
20	6	Gary O'Toole	Ireland	2:07.77	
21	8	Darren Ward	Canada	2:07.84	
22	5	Satoshi Takeda	Japan	2:08.11	
23	7	József Szabó	Hungary	2:09.08	
24	5	Javier Careaga	Mexico	2:09.38	
25	5	Rodrigo González	Mexico	2:09.52	
26	4	Júlio César Rebolal	Brazil	2:09.62	
27	5	Eðvarð Þór Eðvarðsson	Iceland	2:10.18	
28	4	Diogo Madeira	Portugal	2:10.21	
29	5	Renato Ramalho	Brazil	2:10.32	
30	4	René Concepcion	Philippines	2:10.37	
31	5	Xie Jun	China	2:10.52	
31	5	Martín López-Zubero	Spain	2:10.52	
33	4	Sidney Appelboom	Belgium	2:10.55	
34	4	David Lim Fong Jock	Singapore	2:11.57	
35	3	Lee Jae-soo	South Korea	2:11.88	
36	8	Sergio López Miró	Spain	2:13.48	
37	3	Richard Sam Bera	Indonesia	2:13.90	
38	4	Wirmandi Sugriat	Indonesia	2:13.93	
39	3	Hakan Eskioğlu	Turkey	2:14.32	
40	4	Yip Hor Man	Hong Kong	2:14.65	
41	3	Desmond Koh	Singapore	2:14.77	
42	2	Sultan Al-Otaibi	Kuwait	2:15.63	
43	3	Eric Greenwood	Costa Rica	2:15.64	
44	2	Horst Niehaus	Costa Rica	2:16.16	
45	3	Jonathan Sakovich	Guam	2:16.70	
46	2	Kraig Singleton	Virgin Islands	2:16.93	
47	2	Graham Thompson	Zimbabwe	2:17.06	
48	3	Arthur Li Kai Yien	Hong Kong	2:17.10	
49	2	Tsai Hsin-yen	Chinese Taipei	2:17.95	
50	1	Vaughan Smith	Zimbabwe	2:18.07	
51	2	Chiang Chi-li	Chinese Taipei	2:18.76	
52	2	Mouhamed Diop	Senegal	2:20.74	
53	1	Mohamed Bin Abid	United Arab Emirates	2:29.08	
54	2	Bruno N'Diaye	Senegal	2:29.18	
55	1	Mohamed Abdullah	United Arab Emirates	2:31.44	
56	1	Rami Kantari	Lebanon	2:34.53	
	3	Patrick Concepcion	Philippines	DNS	
	8	Jan Bidrman	Sweden	DNS	

=== Finals ===
==== Final B ====
Rank	Lane	Name	Nationality	Time	Notes
9	4	David Wharton	United States	2:03.05	
10	1	John Davey	Great Britain	2:04.17	
11	8	Neil Cochran	Great Britain	2:05.44	
12	3	Christophe Bordeau	France	2:05.51	
13	2	Luca Sacchi	Italy	2:05.68	
14	7	Charalambos Papanikolaou	Greece	2:06.61	
15	5	Jens-Peter Berndt	West Germany	2:06.76	
16	6	Bill Stapleton	United States	2:06.82	

==== Final A ====
Rank	Lane	Name	Nationality	Time	Notes
1st place, gold medalist(s)	4	Tamás Darnyi	Hungary	2:00.17	WR
2nd place, silver medalist(s)	3	Patrick Kühl	East Germany	2:01.61	
3rd place, bronze medalist(s)	5	Vadim Yaroshchuk	Soviet Union	2:02.40	
4	6	Mikhail Zubkov	Soviet Union	2:02.92	
5	1	Peter Bermel	West Germany	2:03.81	
6	8	Robert Bruce	Australia	2:04.34	
7	7	Raik Hannemann	East Germany	2:04.82	
8	2	Gary Anderson	Canada	2:06.35	
