= Swimming at the 1992 Summer Olympics – Men's 400 metre individual medley =

Men's 400 metre individual medley at the Games of the XXV Olympiad
- Venue: Piscines Bernat Picornell
- Date: 27 July 1992 (heats & finals)
- Competitors: 33 from 25 nations
- Winning time: 4:14.23 OR

Medalists
1st place, gold medalist(s)		Tamás Darnyi	Hungary
2nd place, silver medalist(s)		Eric Namesnik	United States
3rd place, bronze medalist(s)		Luca Sacchi	Italy

The men's 400 metre individual medley event at the 1992 Summer Olympics took place on 27 July at the Piscines Bernat Picornell in Barcelona, Spain.

== Records ==
Prior to this competition, the existing world and Olympic records were as follows.

World record	Tamás Darnyi (HUN)	4:12.36	Perth, Australia	8 January 1991
Olympic record	Tamás Darnyi (HUN)	4:14.75	Seoul, South Korea	21 September 1988

The following records were established during the competition:

Date	Round	Name	Nation	Time	Record
27 July	Final A	Tamás Darnyi	Hungary	4:14.23	OR

== Results ==
=== Heats ===
Rule: The eight fastest swimmers advance to final A (Q), while the next eight to final B (q).

Rank	Heat	Lane	Name	Nationality	Time	Notes
1	4	4	Eric Namesnik	United States	4:17.75	Q
2	5	4	Tamás Darnyi	Hungary	4:18.34	Q
3	4	5	Patrick Kühl	Germany	4:18.68	Q
4	4	2	Serghei Mariniuc	Unified Team	4:19.05	Q
5	3	4	Luca Sacchi	Italy	4:19.42	Q
6	3	5	Christian Geßner	Germany	4:19.92	Q
7	4	3	Takahiro Fujimoto	Japan	4:20.07	Q, NR
8	5	5	David Wharton	United States	4:20.73	Q
9	5	2	Jorge Pérez	Spain	4:21.33	q
10	3	6	Philip Bryant	Australia	4:21.45	q
11	5	8	Petteri Lehtinen	Finland	4:22.10	q, NR
12	5	3	Curtis Myden	Canada	4:22.41	q
13	5	7	Jan Bidrman	Sweden	4:22.96	q
14	3	7	Robert Baird	Canada	4:24.31	q
15	4	7	Marcin Maliński	Poland	4:24.72	q
16	3	3	Attila Czene	Hungary	4:26.31	q
17	4	1	Marian Satnoianu	Romania	4:26.33	
18	4	6	Matthew Dunn	Australia	4:27.65	
19	5	6	Marcel Wouda	Netherlands	4:28.51	
20	2	3	Igor Łuczak	Poland	4:28.60	
21	1	4	Desmond Koh	Singapore	4:28.95	NR
22	2	5	Renato Ramalho	Brazil	4:29.28	
23	4	8	Denislav Kalchev	Bulgaria	4:31.49	
24	2	6	Clifford Lyne	South Africa	4:32.64	
25	5	1	Andy Rolley	Great Britain	4:32.82	
26	3	8	Andrés Minelli	Argentina	4:33.41	
27	2	4	Alejandro Bermúdez	Colombia	4:33.87	
28	3	1	David Monasterio	Puerto Rico	4:36.39	
29	2	2	Ratapong Sirisanont	Thailand	4:37.95	
30	1	6	Duncan Todd	Hong Kong	4:41.84	
31	1	5	Roberto Bonilla	Guatemala	4:43.54	
	3	2	Toshiaki Kurasawa	Japan	DSQ	
	1	3	Arthur Li Kai Yien	Hong Kong	DNS	

=== Finals ===
==== Final B ====
Rank	Lane	Name	Nationality	Time	Notes
9	8	Attila Czene	Hungary	4:21.28	
10	6	Curtis Myden	Canada	4:21.91	
11	4	Jorge Perez	Spain	4:22.06	
12	3	Petteri Lehtinen	Finland	4:22.10	=NR
13	5	Philip Bryant	Australia	4:22.36	
14	1	Marcin Maliński	Poland	4:22.59	
15	2	Jan Bidrman	Sweden	4:23.52	
16	7	Robert Baird	Canada	4:25.06	

==== Final A ====
Rank	Lane	Name	Nationality	Time	Notes
1st place, gold medalist(s)	5	Tamás Darnyi	Hungary	4:14.23	OR
2nd place, silver medalist(s)	4	Eric Namesnik	United States	4:15.57	
3rd place, bronze medalist(s)	2	Luca Sacchi	Italy	4:16.34	NR
4	8	David Wharton	United States	4:17.26	
5	7	Christian Geßner	Germany	4:17.88	
6	3	Patrick Kühl	Germany	4:19.66	
7	6	Serghei Mariniuc	Unified Team	4:22.93	
8	1	Takahiro Fujimoto	Japan	4:23.80	
