= 400 metres individual medley =

The 400 metres individual medley is an event in competitive swimming. World records are ratified by World Aquatics (formerly FINA). The current long course world record holders are France's Léon Marchand and Canada's Summer McIntosh, while the current short course world record holders are Japan's Tomoyuki Matsushita, and McIntosh.

The men's and women's events have been contested at the Olympic Games since 1964; the current Olympic champions are Marchand and McIntosh. The men's and women's events have been contested at the World Aquatics Championships since the inaugural championships in 1973; the current world champions (long course) are Marchand and McIntosh. The men's and women's events have been contested at the World Aquatics Swimming Championships (25m) since the inaugural championships in 1993; the current world champions (short course) are Ilya Borodin, and McIntosh.

== World record progression ==
=== Men long course ===
#	Time		Name	Nationality	Date	Meet	Location	Ref
1	5:15.6		Gary Heinrich	United States	27 August 1957	-	Philadelphia, United States	
2	5:12.9		Vladimir Strushanov	Soviet Union	20 October 1957	-	Moscow, Soviet Union	
3	5:08.8		Ian Black	Great Britain	6 June 1959	-	Cardiff, Great Britain	
4	5:07.8		George Harrison	United States	24 June 1960	-	Los Angeles, United States	
5	5:05.3		George Harrison	United States	24 June 1960	-	Los Angeles, United States	
6	5:04.5		Dennis Rounsaville	United States	22 July 1960	-	Toledo, United States	
7	5:04.3		Ted Stickles	United States	1 July 1961	-	Chicago, United States	
8	4:55.6		Ted Stickles	United States	18 August 1961	-	Los Angeles, United States	
9	4:53.8		Gerhard Hetz	West Germany	24 May 1962	-	Moscow, Soviet Union	
10	4:51.4		Ted Stickles	United States	30 June 1962	-	Chicago, United States	
11	4:51.0		Ted Stickles	United States	12 July 1962	-	Louisville, United States	
12	4:50.2		Gerhard Hetz	West Germany	12 October 1963	-	Tokyo, Japan	
13	4:48.6		Dick Roth	United States	31 July 1964	-	Los Altos, United States	
14	4:45.4		Dick Roth	United States	14 October 1964	Olympic Games	Tokyo, Japan	
15	4:45.3		Andrey Dunayev	Soviet Union	3 April 1968	-	Tallinn, Soviet Union	
16	4:45.1		Greg Buckingham	United States	6 July 1968	Santa Clara Invitational	Santa Clara, United States	
17	4:43.4		Gary Hall Sr.	United States	20 July 1968	-	Los Angeles, United States	
18	4:43.3	h	Charlie Hickcox	United States	30 August 1968	US Olympic Trials	Long Beach, United States	
19	4:39.0		Charlie Hickcox	United States	30 August 1968	US Olympic Trials	Long Beach, United States	
20	4:38.7		Gary Hall Sr.	United States	11 July 1969	Santa Clara Invitational	Santa Clara, United States	
21	4:33.9		Gary Hall Sr.	United States	15 August 1969	AAU Nationals	Louisville, United States	
22	4:31.0		Gary Hall Sr.	United States	21 August 1970	AAU Nationals	Los Angeles, United States	
23	4:30.81		Gary Hall Sr.	United States	3 August 1972	US Olympic Trials	Chicago, United States	
24	4:28.89		András Hargitay	Hungary	20 August 1974	European Championships	Vienna, Austria	
25	4:26.00		Zoltán Verrasztó	Hungary	2 April 1976	AAU Indoor Championships	Long Beach, United States	
26	4:23.68		Rod Strachan	United States	25 July 1976	Olympic Games	Montreal, Canada	
27	4:23.39		Jesse Vassallo	United States	4 August 1978	AAU Championships	The Woodlands, United States	
28	4:20.05		Jesse Vassallo	United States	28 August 1978	World Championships	West Berlin, West Germany	
29	4:19.78		Ricardo Prado	Brazil	8 August 1982	World Championships	Guayaquil, Ecuador	
30	4:19.61		Jens-Peter Berndt	East Germany	23 May 1984	East German Championships	Magdeburg, East Germany	
31	4:17.53		Alex Baumann	Canada	17 June 1984	Canadian Olympic Trials	Etobicoke, Canada	
32	4:17.41		Alex Baumann	Canada	30 July 1984	Olympic Games	Los Angeles, United States	
33	4:16.12		David Wharton	United States	14 August 1987	Pan Pacific Championships	Brisbane, Australia	
34	4:15.42		Tamás Darnyi	Hungary	19 August 1987	European Championships	Strasbourg, France	
35	4:14.75		Tamás Darnyi	Hungary	21 September 1988	Olympic Games	Seoul, South Korea	
36	4:12.36		Tamás Darnyi	Hungary	8 January 1991	World Championships	Perth, Australia	
37	4:12.30		Tom Dolan	United States	11 September 1994	World Championships	Rome, Italy	
38	4:11.76		Tom Dolan	United States	17 September 2000	Olympic Games	Sydney, Australia	
39	4:11.09		Michael Phelps	United States	15 August 2002	US National Championships	Fort Lauderdale, United States	
40	4:10.73		Michael Phelps	United States	7 April 2003	Duel in the Pool	Indianapolis, United States	
41	4:09.09		Michael Phelps	United States	27 July 2003	World Championships	Barcelona, Spain	
42	4:08.41		Michael Phelps	United States	7 July 2004	US Olympic Trials	Long Beach, United States	
43	4:08.26		Michael Phelps	United States	14 August 2004	Olympic Games	Athens, Greece	
44	4:06.22		Michael Phelps	United States	1 April 2007	World Championships	Melbourne, Australia	
45	4:05.25		Michael Phelps	United States	29 June 2008	US Olympic Trials	Omaha, United States	
46	4:03.84		Michael Phelps	United States	10 August 2008	Olympic Games	Beijing, China	
47	4:02.50		Léon Marchand	France	23 July 2023	World Championships	Fukuoka, Japan	

=== Men short course ===
#	Time	Name	Nationality	Date	Meet	Location	Ref
1	4:08.77	Luca Sacchi	Italy	29 February 1992	World Cup	Palma de Mallorca, Spain	
2	4:07.10	Jani Sievinen	Finland	9 February 1993	World Cup	Malmö, Sweden	
3	4:06.03	Jani Sievinen	Finland	20 January 1996	-	Lappeenranta, Finland	
4	4:05.59	Marcel Wouda	Netherlands	1 February 1997	World Cup	Gelsenkirchen, Germany	
5	4:05.41	Marcel Wouda	Netherlands	8 February 1997	World Cup	Paris, France	
6	4:04.24	Matthew Dunn	Australia	24 September 1998	Australian Championships	Perth, Australia	
7	4:02.72	Brian Johns	Canada	23 February 2003	Canadian University Championships	Victoria, Canada	
8	4:00.37	László Cseh	Hungary	9 December 2005	European Championships	Trieste, Italy	
9	3:59.33	László Cseh	Hungary	14 December 2007	European Championships	Debrecen, Hungary	
10	3:57.27	László Cseh	Hungary	11 December 2009	European Championships	Istanbul, Turkey	
11	3:55.50	Ryan Lochte	United States	16 December 2010	World Championships	Dubai, United Arab Emirates	
12	3:54.81	Daiya Seto	Japan	20 December 2019	International Swimming League	Las Vegas, United States	
13	3:54.33	Tomoyuki Matsushita	Japan	11 October 2026	Japanese Championships	Saga, Japan	

=== Women long course ===
#	Time	Name	Nationality	Date	Meet	Location	Ref
1	5:46.6	Sylvia Ruuska	United States	27 June 1958	-	Los Angeles, United States	
2	5:43.7	Sylvia Ruuska	United States	1 August 1958	-	Topeka, United States	
3	5:41.1	Sylvia Ruuska	United States	24 February 1959	-	Melbourne, Australia	
4	5:40.2	Sylvia Ruuska	United States	17 July 1959	-	Redding, United States	
5	5:36.5	Donna de Varona	United States	15 July 1960	-	Indianapolis, United States	
6	5:34.5	Donna de Varona	United States	11 August 1961	-	Philadelphia, United States	
7	5:29.7	Donna de Varona	United States	2 June 1962	-	Los Altos, United States	
8	5:27.4	Sharon Finneran	United States	26 July 1962	-	Osaka, Japan	
9	5:24.7	Donna de Varona	United States	26 July 1962	-	Osaka, Japan	
10	5:21.9	Sharon Finneran	United States	28 July 1962	-	Osaka, Japan	
11	5:16.5	Donna de Varona	United States	10 March 1964	-	Lima, Peru	
12	5:14.9	Donna de Varona	United States	30 August 1964	-	New York City, United States	
13	5:11.7	Claudia Kolb	United States	9 July 1967	Santa Clara International	Santa Clara, United States	
14	5:09.7	Claudia Kolb	United States	1 August 1967	Pan American Games	Winnipeg, Canada	
15	5:08.2	Claudia Kolb	United States	19 August 1967	AAU Nationals	Philadelphia, United States	
16	5:04.7	Claudia Kolb	United States	24 August 1968	US Olympic Trials	Los Angeles, United States	
17	5:02.97	Gail Neall	Australia	31 August 1972	Olympic Games	Munich, West Germany	
18	5:01.10	Angela Franke	East Germany	18 August 1973	-	Utrecht, Netherlands	
19	4:57.51	Gudrun Wegner	East Germany	6 September 1973	World Championships	Belgrade, Yugoslavia	
20	4:52.42	Ulrike Tauber	East Germany	21 August 1974	European Championships	Vienna, Austria	
21	4:52.20	Ulrike Tauber	East Germany	7 June 1975	East German Championships	Wittenberg, East Germany	
22	4:48.79	Birgit Treiber	East Germany	1 June 1976	East German Championships	East Berlin, East Germany	
23	4:42.77	Ulrike Tauber	East Germany	24 July 1976	Olympic Games	Montreal, Canada	
24	4:40.83	Tracy Caulkins	United States	23 August 1978	World Championships	West Berlin, West Germany	
25	4:39.96	Petra Schneider	East Germany	30 March 1980	-	Leningrad, Soviet Union	
26	4:38.44	Petra Schneider	East Germany	27 May 1980	-	Magdeburg, East Germany	
27	4:36.29	Petra Schneider	East Germany	26 July 1980	Olympic Games	Moscow, Soviet Union	
28	4:36.10	Petra Schneider	East Germany	26 July 1982	World Championships	Guayaquil, Ecuador	
29	4:34.79	Chen Yan	China	13 October 1997	Chinese National Games	Shanghai, China	
30	4:33.59	Yana Klochkova	Ukraine	16 September 2000	Olympic Games	Sydney, Australia	
31	4:32.89	Katie Hoff	United States	1 April 2007	World Championships	Melbourne, Australia	
32	4:31.46	Stephanie Rice	Australia	22 March 2008	Australian Championships	Sydney, Australia	
33	4:31.12	Katie Hoff	United States	29 June 2008	US Olympic Trials	Omaha, United States	
34	4:29.45	Stephanie Rice	Australia	10 August 2008	Olympic Games	Beijing, China	
35	4:28.43	Ye Shiwen	China	28 July 2012	Olympic Games	London, United Kingdom	
36	4:26.36	Katinka Hosszú	Hungary	6 August 2016	Olympic Games	Rio de Janeiro, Brazil	
37	4:25.87	Summer McIntosh	Canada	1 April 2023	Canadian Trials	Toronto, Canada	
38	4:24.38	Summer McIntosh	Canada	16 May 2024	Canadian Trials	Toronto, Canada	
39	4:23.65	Summer McIntosh	Canada	11 June 2025	Canadian Trials	Victoria, Canada	

=== Women short course ===
#	Time		Name	Nationality	Date	Meet	Location	Ref
1	4:29.00		Dai Guohong	China	2 December 1993	World Championships	Palma de Mallorca, Spain	
2	4:27.83		Yana Klochkova	Ukraine	20 January 2002	World Cup	Paris, France	
3	4:26.52		Kirsty Coventry	Zimbabwe	9 April 2008	World Championships	Manchester, United Kingdom	
4	4:25.87		Julia Smit	(United States) USA	28 November 2008	Canada Cup	Toronto, Canada	
5	4:25.06		Mireia Belmonte	Spain	14 December 2008	European Championships	Rijeka, Croatia	
6	4:22.88		Kathryn Meaklim	South Africa	22 November 2009	World Cup	Singapore	
7	4:21.04		Julia Smit	(United States) USA	18 December 2009	Duel in the Pool	Manchester, United Kingdom	
8	4:20.85		Katinka Hosszú	Hungary	11 August 2013	World Cup	Berlin, Germany	
9	4:20.83		Katinka Hosszú	Hungary	28 August 2014	World Cup	Doha, Qatar	
10	4:19.86		Mireia Belmonte	Spain	3 December 2014	World Championships	Doha, Qatar	
11	4:19.46	h	Katinka Hosszú	Hungary	2 December 2015	European Championships	Netanya, Israel	
12	4:18.94		Mireia Belmonte	Spain	12 August 2017	World Cup	Eindhoven, Netherlands	
13	4:15.48		Summer McIntosh	Canada	14 December 2024	World Championships	Budapest, Hungary	

Legend: # – Record awaiting ratification by FINA; e – equalled existing record;
Records not set in finals: h – heat; sf – semifinal; r – relay 1st leg; rh – relay heat 1st leg; b – B final; † – en route to final mark; so – swim-off; tt – time trial

== All-time top 25 ==
Tables show data for two definitions of "Top 25" - the top 25 400 m individual medley times and the top 25 athletes:
- denotes top performance for athletes in the top 25 400 m individual medley times
- denotes lesser performances, still in the top 25 400 m individual medley times, by repeat athletes
- denotes top performance (only) for other top 25 athletes who fall outside the top 25 400 m individual medley times

=== Men long course ===
- Correct as of September 2026

Ath.#	Perf.#	Time	Athlete	Nation	Date	Place	Ref.
1	1	4:02.50	Léon Marchand	France	25 July 2023	Fukuoka	
	2	4:02.95	Marchand #2		28 July 2024	Paris	
2	3	4:03.84	Michael Phelps	United States	10 August 2008	Beijing	
	4	4:04.28	Marchand #3		18 June 2022	Budapest	
	5	4:04.56	Marchand #4		27 June 2026	Saint-Étienne	
	6	4:04.73	Marchand #5		3 August 2025	Singapore	
3	7	4:05.18	Ryan Lochte	United States	28 July 2012	London	
	8	4:05.25	Phelps #2		29 June 2008	Omaha	
4	9	4:05.83	Tomoyuki Matsushita	Japan	3 September 2026	Osaka	
5	10	4:05.90	Chase Kalisz	United States	30 July 2017	Budapest	
6	11	4:06.05	Kosuke Hagino	Japan	6 August 2016	Rio de Janeiro	
	12	4:06.08	Lochte #2		29 June 2008	Omaha	
7	13	4:06.09	Daiya Seto	Japan	25 January 2020	Tokyo	
8	14	4:06.16	László Cseh	Hungary	10 August 2008	Beijing	
	15	4:06.22	Phelps #3		1 April 2007	Melbourne	
	16	4:06.40	Lochte #3		7 July 2009	Indianapolis	
9	17	4:06.56	Carson Foster	United States	18 June 2022	Budapest	
9	17	4:06.56	Carson Foster	United States	25 July 2023	Fukuoka	
	19	4:06.75	Kalisz #2		6 August 2016	Rio de Janeiro	
	19	4:06.75	Matsushita #2		13 August 2026	Irvine	
	21	4:06.93	Matsushita #3		22 March 2026	Tokyo	
10	22	4:06.96	Tyler Clary	United States	7 July 2009	Indianapolis	
	23	4:06.99	Kalisz #3		29 June 2017	Indianapolis	
	24	4:07.01	Lochte #4		2 August 2009	Rome	
	25	4:07.02	Foster #3		5 December 2025	Austin	
11	25	4:07.02	Yumeki Kojima	Japan	22 September 2026	Tokyo	
12		4:07.46	Bobby Finke	United States	5 June 2025	Indianapolis	
13		4:07.47	Dávid Verrasztó	Hungary	24 June 2017	Rome	
14		4:07.67	Asaki Nishikawa	Japan	29 November 2025	Tokyo	
15		4:08.05	Ilya Borodin	Russia	25 July 2022	Kazan	
16		4:08.70	Lewis Clareburt	New Zealand	30 July 2022	Birmingham	
17		4:08.85	Max Litchfield	Great Britain	28 July 2024	Paris	
18		4:08.86	Thiago Pereira	Brazil	2 August 2009	Rome	
18		4:08.86	Thiago Pereira	Brazil	28 July 2012	London	
19		4:09.10	Wang Shun	China	4 September 2013	Shenyang	
20		4:09.18	Duncan Scott	Great Britain	7 April 2022	Sheffield	
21		4:09.19	Raito Numata	Japan	12 September 2026	Aomori	
22		4:09.22	Jay Litherland	United States	28 July 2019	Gwangju	
23		4:09.24	William Petric	Australia	13 August 2026	Irvine	
24		4:09.27	Brendon Smith	Australia	28 July 2021	Tokyo	
25		4:09.29	Alberto Razzetti	Italy	30 November 2023	Riccione	

=== Men short course ===
- Correct as of October 2026

Ath.#	Perf.#	Time	Athlete	Nation	Date	Place	Ref.
1	1	3:54.33	Tomoyuki Matsushita	Japan	11 October 2026	Saga	
2	2	3:54.81	Daiya Seto	Japan	20 December 2019	Las Vegas	
3	3	3:55.50	Ryan Lochte	United States	16 December 2010	Dubai	
	4	3:55.53	Seto #2		26 October 2019	Tokyo	
	5	3:55.75	Seto #3		17 December 2022	Melbourne	
4	6	3:56.13	Shaine Casas	United States	25 October 2025	Toronto	
	7	3:56.26	Seto #4		20 December 2021	Abu Dhabi	
	8	3:56.33	Seto #5		4 December 2014	Doha	
	9	3:56.43	Seto #6		15 December 2018	Hangzhou	
5	10	3:56.47	Ilya Borodin	Russia	20 December 2021	Abu Dhabi	
6	11	3:56.48	Kosuke Hagino	Japan	13 January 2014	Tokyo	
	12	3:56.83	Borodin #2		14 December 2024	Budapest	
7	13	3:57.01	Alberto Razzetti	Italy	10 December 2023	Otopeni	
8	14	3:57.23	Carson Foster	United States	3 October 2026	Baku	
	15	3:57.25	Seto #7		30 September 2018	Eindhoven	
9	16	3:57.27	László Cseh	Hungary	11 December 2009	Istanbul	
10	17	3:57.40	Oussama Mellouli	Tunisia	16 December 2010	Dubai	
	18	3:57.41	Casas #2		19 October 2025	Westmont	
	19	3:57.45	Foster #2		14 December 2024	Budapest	
11	20	3:57.56	Tyler Clary	United States	16 December 2010	Dubai	
	21	3:57.63	Foster #3		17 December 2022	Melbourne	
	22	3:57.66	Seto #8		15 November 2017	Tokyo	
	23	3:57.67	Borodin #3		25 November 2024	Saint Petersburg	
	24	3:57.85	Seto #9		30 October 2021	Kazan	
12	25	3:57.91	Thomas Fraser-Holmes	Australia	28 November 2015	Sydney	
13		3:58.30	Léon Marchand	France	26 October 2024	Incheon	
14		3:59.21	Matthew Sates	South Africa	17 December 2022	Melbourne	
15		3:59.23	Chad le Clos	South Africa	9 November 2013	Tokyo	
16		3:59.27	William Petric	Australia	30 September 2026	Sydney	
17		3:59.33	Brendon Smith	Australia	30 September 2021	Naples	
18		3:59.47	Péter Bernek	Hungary	14 December 2017	Copenhagen	
19		3:59.81	Duncan Scott	Great Britain	20 December 2019	Las Vegas	
20		3:59.90	Conor Dwyer	United States	10 August 2013	Berlin	
21		3:59.94	Asaki Nishikawa	Japan	11 October 2026	Saga	
22		3:59.99	Wang Shun	China	17 November 2018	Singapore	
23		4:00.05	Josh Bey	United States	30 October 2026	Westmont	
24		4:00.07	Raito Numata	Japan	11 October 2026	Saga	
25		4:00.10	Dávid Verrasztó	Hungary	11 December 2009	Istanbul	

=== Women long course ===
- Correct as of September 2026

Ath.#	Perf.#	Time	Athlete	Nation	Date	Place	Ref.
1	1	4:23.65	Summer McIntosh	Canada	11 June 2025	Victoria	
	2	4:24.38	McIntosh #2		16 May 2024	Toronto	
	3	4:25.78	McIntosh #3		3 August 2025	Singapore	
	4	4:25.87	McIntosh #4		1 April 2023	Toronto	
2	5	4:26.36	Katinka Hosszú	Hungary	6 August 2016	Rio de Janeiro	
	6	4:26.98	McIntosh #5		7 March 2025	Westmont	
	7	4:27.11	McIntosh #6		30 July 2023	Fukuoka	
	8	4:27.31	McIntosh #7		5 June 2026	Austin	
	9	4:27.35	McIntosh #8		6 July 2026	Montreal	
	10	4:27.71	McIntosh #9		29 July 2024	Paris	
	11	4:28.01	McIntosh #10		13 August 2026	Irvine	
	12	4:28.13	McIntosh #11		16 January 2026	Austin	
3	13	4:28.22	Kaylee McKeown	Australia	18 April 2024	Gold Coast	
4	14	4:28.43	Ye Shiwen	China	28 July 2012	London	
5	15	4:28.56	Yu Zidi	China	23 September 2026	Tokyo	
	16	4:28.58	Hosszú #2		6 August 2016	Rio de Janeiro	
	17	4:28.61	McIntosh #12		2 December 2022	Greensboro	
	18	4:29.01	McIntosh #13		29 July 2022	Birmingham	
	19	4:29.12	McIntosh #14		4 March 2022	Toronto	
	20	4:29.33	Hosszú #3		30 July 2017	Budapest	
6	21	4:29.45	Stephanie Rice	Australia	10 August 2008	Beijing	
7	22	4:29.89	Kirsty Coventry	Zimbabwe	10 August 2008	Beijing	
	22	4:29.89	Hosszú #4		4 March 2016	Marseille	
	24	4:29.96	McIntosh #15		1 December 2023	Greensboro	
	25	4:30.31	Hosszú #5		2 August 2009	Rome	
8		4:30.43	Li Xuanxu	China	17 October 2009	Jinan	
9		4:30.82	Yui Ohashi	Japan	8 April 2018	Tokyo	
10		4:30.85	Qi Hui	China	17 October 2009	Jinan	
11		4:31.12	Katie Hoff	United States	29 June 2008	Omaha	
12		4:31.15	Maya Dirado	United States	6 August 2016	Rio de Janeiro	
13		4:31.19	Jenna Forrester	Australia	27 July 2026	Glasgow	
14		4:31.21	Mireia Belmonte	Spain	4 August 2013	Barcelona	
15		4:31.27	Elizabeth Beisel	United States	28 July 2012	London	
16		4:31.33	Hannah Miley	Great Britain	20 March 2009	Sheffield	
17		4:31.41	Katie Grimes	United States	30 July 2023	Fukuoka	
18		4:32.51	Ke Wenxi	China	23 September 2026	Tokyo	
19		4:32.52	Emily Overholt	Canada	9 August 2015	Kazan	
20		4:32.53	Melanie Margalis	United States	6 March 2020	Des Moines	
21		4:32.54	Agostina Hein	Argentina	13 August 2026	Irvine	
22		4:32.76	Emma Weyant	United States	25 July 2021	Tokyo	
23		4:32.88	Sydney Pickrem	Canada	30 July 2017	Budapest	
24		4:33.01	Aimee Willmott	Great Britain	24 July 2014	Glasgow	
25		4:33.09	Yu Yiting	China	13 August 2026	Irvine	

=== Women short course ===
- Correct as of October 2026

Ath.#	Perf.#	Time	Athlete	Nation	Date	Place	Ref.
1	1	4:15.48	Summer McIntosh	Canada	14 December 2024	Budapest	
2	2	4:18.94	Mireia Belmonte	Spain	12 August 2017	Eindhoven	
3	3	4:19.46	Katinka Hosszú	Hungary	2 December 2015	Netanya	
	4	4:19.75	Hosszú #2		2 December 2015	Netanya	
	5	4:19.82	Hosszú #3		6 August 2017	Berlin	
	6	4:19.86	Belmonte #2		3 December 2014	Doha	
4	7	4:20.14	Katie Grimes	United States	14 December 2024	Budapest	
	8	4:20.83	Hosszú #4		28 August 2014	Doha	
	9	4:20.85	Hosszú #5		11 August 2013	Berlin	
5	10	4:21.04	Julia Smit	United States	18 December 2009	Manchester	
	11	4:21.05	Hosszú #6		3 December 2014	Doha	
	12	4:21.21	Hosszú #7		11 December 2015	Indianapolis	
	13	4:21.23	Belmonte #3		15 December 2013	Herning	
	14	4:21.40	Hosszú #8		11 December 2018	Hangzhou	
	15	4:21.49	McIntosh #2		29 October 2022	Toronto	
	16	4:21.67	Hosszú #9		6 December 2016	Windsor	
	17	4:21.91	Hosszú #10		10 November 2018	Tokyo	
	18	4:22.05	Hosszú #11		14 November 2017	Tokyo	
	19	4:22.06	Hosszú #12		1 September 2014	Dubai	
	20	4:22.18	Hosszú #13		8 August 2013	Eindhoven	
	21	4:22.55	Belmonte #4		6 August 2017	Berlin	
	22	4:22.68	Belmonte #5		2 November 2014	Singapore	
6	23	4:22.73	Yui Ohashi	Japan	10 November 2018	Tokyo	
7	24	4:22.74	Yu Yiting	China	15 October 2026	Astana	
8	25	4:22.88	Kathryn Meaklim	South Africa	22 November 2009	Singapore	
9		4:22.97	Ellen Walshe	Ireland	24 October 2025	Toronto	
10		4:23.14	Hannah Miley	Great Britain	12 December 2012	Istanbul	
11		4:23.33	Ye Shiwen	China	12 December 2012	Istanbul	
12		4:23.68	Sydney Pickrem	Canada	15 November 2020	Budapest	
13		4:24.15	Melanie Margalis	United States	20 December 2019	Las Vegas	
14		4:24.25	Mary-Sophie Harvey	Canada	24 October 2025	Toronto	
15		4:24.31	Dagny Knutson	United States	18 December 2009	Manchester	
16		4:24.34	Abbie Wood	Great Britain	14 December 2024	Budapest	
17		4:24.62	Caitlin Leverenz	United States	16 December 2011	Atlanta	
18		4:25.37	Aimee Willmott	Great Britain	15 December 2013	Herning	
19		4:25.50	Hali Flickinger	United States	22 November 2020	Budapest	
20		4:25.55	Tessa Cieplucha	Canada	16 December 2021	Abu Dhabi	
21		4:25.56	Elizabeth Beisel	United States	3 December 2014	Doha	
22		4:25.61	Zsuzsanna Jakabos	Hungary	25 November 2012	Chartres	
23		4:26.06	Alessia Filippi	Italy	14 December 2008	Rijeka	
23		4:26.06	Ella Eastin	United States	12 August 2017	Eindhoven	
25		4:26.31	Bailey Andison	Canada	5 September 2021	Naples	

== Olympic champions ==
=== Men ===
Edition	Winner	Time	Notes	Ref.
(Japan) Tokyo 1964	Dick Roth (USA)	4:45.4	WR	
Mexico City 1968	Charlie Hickcox (USA)	4:48.4		
(West Germany) Munich 1972	Gunnar Larsson (SWE)	4:31.98	OR	
(Canada) Montreal 1976	Rod Strachan (USA)	4:23.68	WR	
(Soviet Union) Moscow 1980	Oleksandr Sydorenko (URS)	4:22.89	OR	
(United States) Los Angeles 1984	Alex Baumann (CAN)	4:17.41	WR	
(South Korea) Seoul 1988	Tamás Darnyi (HUN)	4:14.75	WR	
(Spain) Barcelona 1992	Tamás Darnyi (HUN)	4:14.23	OR	
(United States) Atlanta 1996	Tom Dolan (USA)	4:14.90		
(Australia) Sydney 2000	Tom Dolan (USA)	4:11.76	WR	
(Greece) Athens 2004	Michael Phelps (USA)	4:08.26	WR	
(China) Beijing 2008	Michael Phelps (USA)	4:03.84	WR	
(United Kingdom) London 2012	Ryan Lochte (USA)	4:05.18		
(Brazil) Rio de Janeiro 2016	Kosuke Hagino (JPN)	4:06.05		
(Japan) Tokyo 2020	Chase Kalisz (USA)	4:09.42		
(France) Paris 2024	Léon Marchand (FRA)	4:02.95	OR	

=== Women ===
Edition	Winner	Time	Notes	Ref.
(Japan) Tokyo 1964	Donna de Varona (USA)	5:18.7	OR	
Mexico City 1968	Claudia Kolb (USA)	5:08.5	OR	
(West Germany) Munich 1972	Gail Neall (AUS)	5:02.97	WR	
(Canada) Montreal 1976	Ulrike Tauber (GDR)	4:42.77	WR	
(Soviet Union) Moscow 1980	Petra Schneider (GDR)	4:36.29	WR	
(United States) Los Angeles 1984	Tracy Caulkins (USA)	4:39.24		
(South Korea) Seoul 1988	Janet Evans (USA)	4:37.76		
(Spain) Barcelona 1992	Krisztina Egerszegi (HUN)	4:36.54		
(United States) Atlanta 1996	Michelle Smith (IRL)	4:39.18		
(Australia) Sydney 2000	Yana Klochkova (UKR)	4:33.59	WR	
(Greece) Athens 2004	Yana Klochkova (UKR)	4:34.83		
(China) Beijing 2008	Stephanie Rice (AUS)	4:29.45	WR	
(United Kingdom) London 2012	Ye Shiwen (CHN)	4:28.43	WR	
(Brazil) Rio de Janeiro 2016	Katinka Hosszú (HUN)	4:26.36	WR	
(Japan) Tokyo 2020	Yui Ohashi (JPN)	4:32.08		
(France) Paris 2024	Summer McIntosh (CAN)	4:27.71		

== World champions (long course) ==
=== Men ===
Edition	Winner	Time	Notes	Ref.
(Socialist Federal Republic of Yugoslavia) Belgrade 1973	András Hargitay (HUN)	4:31.11	CR	
(Colombia) Cali 1975	András Hargitay (HUN)	4:32.57		
(West Germany) West Berlin 1978	Jesse Vassallo (USA)	4:20.05	WR	
(Ecuador) Guayaquil 1982	Ricardo Prado (BRA)	4:19.78	WR	
(Spain) Madrid 1986	Tamás Darnyi (HUN)	4:18.98	CR	
(Australia) Perth 1991	Tamás Darnyi (HUN)	4:12.36	WR	
(Italy) Rome 1994	Tom Dolan (USA)	4:12.30	WR	
(Australia) Perth 1998	Tom Dolan (USA)	4:14.95		
(Japan) Fukuoka 2001	Alessio Boggiatto (ITA)	4:13.15		
(Spain) Barcelona 2003	Michael Phelps (USA)	4:09.09	WR	
(Canada) Montreal 2005	László Cseh (HUN)	4:09.63		
(Australia) Melbourne 2007	Michael Phelps (USA)	4:06.22	WR	
(Italy) Rome 2009	Ryan Lochte (USA)	4:07.01		
(China) Shanghai 2011	Ryan Lochte (USA)	4:07.13		
(Spain) Barcelona 2013	Daiya Seto (JPN)	4:08.69		
(Russia) Kazan 2015	Daiya Seto (JPN)	4:08.50		
(Hungary) Budapest 2017	Chase Kalisz (USA)	4:05.90	CR	
(South Korea) Gwangju 2019	Daiya Seto (JPN)	4:08.95		
(Hungary) Budapest 2022	Léon Marchand (FRA)	4:04.28	CR	
(Japan) Fukuoka 2023	Léon Marchand (FRA)	4:02.50	WR	
(Qatar) Doha 2024	Lewis Clareburt (NZL)	4:09.72		
Singapore 2025	Léon Marchand (FRA)	4:04.73		

=== Women ===
Edition	Winner	Time	Notes	Ref.
(Socialist Federal Republic of Yugoslavia) Belgrade 1973	Gudrun Wegner (GDR)	4:57.51	WR	
(Colombia) Cali 1975	Ulrike Tauber (GDR)	4:52.76	CR	
(West Germany) West Berlin 1978	Tracy Caulkins (USA)	4:40.83	WR	
(Ecuador) Guayaquil 1982	Petra Schneider (GDR)	4:36.10	WR	
(Spain) Madrid 1986	Kathleen Nord (GDR)	4:43.75		
(Australia) Perth 1991	Lin Li (CHN)	4:41.45		
(Italy) Rome 1994	Dai Guohong (CHN)	4:39.14		
(Australia) Perth 1998	Chen Yan (CHN)	4:36.66		
(Japan) Fukuoka 2001	Yana Klochkova (UKR)	4:36.98		
(Spain) Barcelona 2003	Yana Klochkova (UKR)	4:36.74		
(Canada) Montreal 2005	Katie Hoff (USA)	4:36.07	CR	
(Australia) Melbourne 2007	Katie Hoff (USA)	4:32.89	WR	
(Italy) Rome 2009	Katinka Hosszú (HUN)	4:30.31	CR	
(China) Shanghai 2011	Elizabeth Beisel (USA)	4:31.78		
(Spain) Barcelona 2013	Katinka Hosszú (HUN)	4:30.41		
(Russia) Kazan 2015	Katinka Hosszú (HUN)	4:30.39		
(Hungary) Budapest 2017	Katinka Hosszú (HUN)	4:29.33	CR	
(South Korea) Gwangju 2019	Katinka Hosszú (HUN)	4:30.39		
(Hungary) Budapest 2022	Summer McIntosh (CAN)	4:32.04		
(Japan) Fukuoka 2023	Summer McIntosh (CAN)	4:27.11	CR	
(Qatar) Doha 2024	Freya Colbert (GBR)	4:37.14		
Singapore 2025	Summer McIntosh (CAN)	4:25.78	CR	

== World champions (short course) ==
=== Men ===
Edition	Winner	Time	Notes	Ref.
(Spain) Palma de Mallorca 1993	Curtis Myden (CAN)	4:10.41	CR	
(Brazil) Rio de Janeiro 1995	Matthew Dunn (AUS)	4:08.02	CR	
(Sweden) Gothenburg 1997	Matthew Dunn (AUS)	4:06.89	CR	
Hong Kong 1999	Matthew Dunn (AUS)	4:06.05	CR	
(Greece) Athens 2000	Jani Sievinen (FIN)	4:09.54		
(Russia) Moscow 2002	Tom Wilkens (USA)	4:04.82	CR	
(United States) Indianapolis 2004	Oussama Mellouli (TUN)	4:07.02		
(China) Shanghai 2006	Ryan Lochte (USA)	4:02.49	CR	
(United Kingdom) Manchester 2008	Ryan Lochte (USA)	4:03.21		
(United Arab Emirates) Dubai 2010	Ryan Lochte (USA)	3:55.50	WR	
(Turkey) Istanbul 2012	Daiya Seto (JPN)	3:59.15		
(Qatar) Doha 2014	Daiya Seto (JPN)	3:56.33		
(Canada) Windsor 2016	Daiya Seto (JPN)	3:59.24		
(China) Hangzhou 2018	Daiya Seto (JPN)	3:56.43		
(United Arab Emirates) Abu Dhabi 2021	Daiya Seto (JPN)	3:56.26		
(Australia) Melbourne 2022	Daiya Seto (JPN)	3:55.75		
(Hungary) Budapest 2024	Ilya Borodin (NAB)	3:56.83		

=== Women ===
Edition	Winner	Time	Notes	Ref.
(Spain) Palma de Mallorca 1993	Dai Guohong (CHN)	4:29.00	WR	
(Brazil) Rio de Janeiro 1995	Joanne Malar (CAN)	4:36.40		
(Sweden) Gothenburg 1997	Emma Johnson (AUS)	4:35.18		
Hong Kong 1999	Yana Klochkova (UKR)	4:32.32		
(Greece) Athens 2000	Yana Klochkova (UKR)	4:32.32		
(Russia) Moscow 2002	Yana Klochkova (UKR)	4:30.63		
(United States) Indianapolis 2004	Kaitlin Sandeno (USA)	4:30.12		
(China) Shanghai 2006	Qi Hui (CHN)	4:34.28		
(United Kingdom) Manchester 2008	Kirsty Coventry (ZIM)	4:26.52	WR	
(United Arab Emirates) Dubai 2010	Mireia Belmonte (ESP)	4:24.21	CR	
(Turkey) Istanbul 2012	Hannah Miley (GBR)	4:23.14	CR	
(Qatar) Doha 2014	Mireia Belmonte (ESP)	4:19.86	WR	
(Canada) Windsor 2016	Katinka Hosszú (HUN)	4:21.67		
(China) Hangzhou 2018	Katinka Hosszú (HUN)	4:21.40		
(United Arab Emirates) Abu Dhabi 2021	Tessa Cieplucha (CAN)	4:25.55		
(Australia) Melbourne 2022	Hali Flickinger (USA)	4:26.51		
(Hungary) Budapest 2024	Summer McIntosh (CAN)	4:15.48	WR	
