= György Kosztolánczy =

György Kosztolánczy may refer to:

- György Kosztolánczy (judoka)
- György Kosztolánczy (swimmer)
