= Hetz =

Hetz can refer to several things:

- A German word meaning rush or hurry.
- A Hebrew word (חץ) meaning arrow.
- The Israeli Arrow missile defense system
- Hetz (political party) (an acronym for Ḥilonit Tzionit (חילונית ציונית, "Secular Zionist"), a former political party in Israel

== People with the surname ==
- Gerhard Hetz (1942–2012), German Olympic swimmer
