= Swimming at the 1964 Summer Olympics – Men's 400 metre individual medley =

Men's 400 metre individual medley at the Games of the XVIII Olympiad
- Venue: Yoyogi National Gymnasium
- Dates: 12 October 1964 (heats); 14 October 1964 (final)
- Competitors: 30 from 18 nations
- Winning time: 4:45.4 WR

Medalists
1st place, gold medalist(s)		Dick Roth	United States
2nd place, silver medalist(s)		Roy Saari	United States
3rd place, bronze medalist(s)		Gerhard Hetz	United Team of Germany

The men's 400 metre individual medley event at the 1964 Summer Olympics took place on 12–14 October. This swimming event used medley swimming. Because an Olympic size swimming pool is 50 metres long, this race consisted of eight lengths of the pool. The first two lengths were swum using the butterfly stroke, the second pair with the backstroke, the third pair of lengths in breaststroke, and the final two were freestyle. Unlike other events using freestyle, swimmers could not use butterfly, backstroke, or breaststroke for the freestyle leg; most swimmers use the front crawl in freestyle events.

== Results ==
=== Heats ===
Heat 1

Rank	Athlete	Country	Time	Note
1	Carl Robie	United States	4:52.0	
2	Ralph Hutton	Canada	5:06.2	
3	John Oravainen	Australia	5:07.0	
4	Stefan Weinrich	Germany	5:07.8	
5	Celestino Pérez	Puerto Rico	5:10.9	
6	Veljko Rogošić	Yugoslavia	5:11.0	
7	Gershon Shefa	Israel	5:11.2	

Heat 2

Rank	Athlete	Country	Time	Note
1	Sandy Gilchrist	Canada	4:58.3	
2	Dick Roth	United States	5:01.3	
3	Terry Buck	Australia	5:02.5	
4	Elliot Chenaux	Puerto Rico	5:11.3	
5	Juan Fortuny	Spain	5:18.2	
6	Juan Alanís	Mexico	5:18.6	
7	António Basto	Portugal	5:19.7	
8	Luis Paz	Peru	5:39.5	

Heat 3

Rank	Athlete	Country	Time	Note
1	Roy Saari	United States	5:02.3	
2	György Kosztolánczy	Hungary	5:03.8	
3	Jan Jiskoot	Netherlands	5:04.4	
4	Dieter Pfeifer	Germany	5:05.2	
5	Ilkka Suvanto	Finland	5:09.0	
6	Rafael Hernández	Mexico	5:09.8	
7	Charles Fox	Northern Rhodesia	5:38.2	

Heat 4

Rank	Athlete	Country	Time	Note
1	Gerhard Hetz	Germany	4:57.6	
2	Csaba Ali	Hungary	5:05.4	
3	Olle Ferm	Sweden	5:10.5	
4	Alex Alexander	Australia	5:10.8	
5	Guðmundur Gíslason	Iceland	5:15.5	
6	Hannu Vaahtoranta	Finland	5:16.2	
7	Guillermo Davila	Mexico	5:27.1	
8	Narong Chok-Umnuay	Thailand	5:44.1	

=== Final ===
Rank	Athlete	Country	Time	Notes
1	Dick Roth	United States	4:45.4	WR
2	Roy Saari	United States	4:47.1	
3	Gerhard Hetz	United Team of Germany	4:51.0	
4	Carl Robie	United States	4:51.4	
5	Sandy Gilchrist	Canada	4:57.6	
6	Jan Jiskoot	Netherlands	5:01.9	
7	György Kosztolánczy	Hungary	5:01.9	
8	Terry Buck	Australia	5:03.0	

Key: WR = World record
