= Rui Borges (disambiguation) =

Rui Borges (born 1981) is a Portuguese footballer and football manager.

Rui Borges may also refer to:

- Rui Borges (swimmer) (born 1967), Portuguese swimmer
- Rui Borges (footballer, born 1973), Portuguese footballer
