= Tihanyi =

Tihanyi is a surname of Hungarian origin. Notable people with the surname include:

- Endre Tihanyi (1945–2022), Hungarian gymnast
- Jenő Tihanyi (1936–2007), Canadian swimming coach
- József Tihanyi (born 1946), Hungarian athlete
- Kálmán Tihanyi (1897–1947), Hungarian physicist and inventor
- Lajos Tihanyi (1885–1938), Hungarian painter and lithographer
- László Tihanyi (born 1956), Hungarian composer and conductor
- Peter Tihanyi (born 2000), Hungarian professional wrestler
- Sándor Tihanyi (born 1963), Hungarian motorcycle rider
