= World record progression 200 metres individual medley =

The first world record in the 200 metres individual medley in long course (50 metres) swimming was recognised by the International Swimming Federation (FINA) in 1956, followed by the women a year later. In the short course (25 metres) swimming events the world's governing body recognizes world records since March 3, 1991.

== Men ==
=== Long course ===
#	Time		Name	Nationality	Date	Meet	Location	Ref
1	2:30.7		George Harrison	United States	24 August 1956	-	Los Angeles, United States	
2	2:29.1		Frank Brunnell	United States	19 July 1958	-	Akron, United States	
3	2:26.2		Gary Heinrich	United States	27 June 1959	-	Los Angeles, United States	
4	2:24.7		Lance Larson	United States	11 July 1959	-	Santa Clara, United States	
5	2:22.2		John McGill	United States	23 July 1960	-	Toledo, United States	
6	2:22.1		Ted Stickles	United States	23 July 1960	-	Toledo, United States	
7	2:21.3		Ted Stickles	United States	2 July 1961	-	Chicago, United States	
8	2:20.5		Ted Stickles	United States	22 July 1961	-	Cuyahoga Falls, United States	
9	2:19.6		Ted Stickles	United States	19 August 1961	Men's NAAA Championships	Los Angeles, United States	
10	2:15.9		Ted Stickles	United States	19 August 1961	Men's NAAA Championships	Los Angeles, United States	
11	2:15.5		Dick Roth	United States	2 August 1964	US National Championships	Los Altos, United States	
12	2:14.9		Dick Roth	United States	15 August 1964	-	Maumee, United States	
13	2:13.1		Greg Buckingham	United States	24 July 1966	-	Los Altos, United States	
14	2:12.4		Greg Buckingham	United States	21 August 1966	-	Lincoln, United States	
15	2:11.3		Greg Buckingham	United States	23 August 1967	-	Oak Park, United States	
16	2:10.6		Charlie Hickcox	United States	31 August 1968	US Olympic Trials	Los Angeles, United States	
17	2:09.6		Gary Hall Sr.	United States	17 August 1969	AAU Championships	Louisville, United States	
18	2:09.5		Gary Hall Sr.	United States	23 August 1970	AAU Championships	Los Angeles, United States	
19	2:09.3		Gunnar Larsson	Sweden	12 September 1970	European Championships	Barcelona, Spain	
20	2:09.30		Gary Hall Sr.	United States	2 August 1972	US Olympic Trials	Chicago, United States	
21	2:07.17		Gunnar Larsson	Sweden	3 September 1972	Olympic Games	Munich, West Germany	
22	2:06.32		David Wilkie	Great Britain	24 August 1974	European Championships	Vienna, Austria	
22	2:06.32	=	Steve Furniss	United States	1 September 1974	USA vs East Germany Dual Meet	Concord, United States	
24	2:06.08		Bruce Furniss	United States	23 August 1975	AAU Championships	Kansas City, United States	
25	2:05.31		Graham Smith	Canada	4 August 1977	-	Montreal, Canada	
26	2:05.24		Oleksandr Sydorenko	Soviet Union	9 July 1978	Soviet Union Championships	Moscow, Soviet Union	
27	2:04.39		Steve Lundquist	United States	2 August 1978	US National Championships	The Woodlands, United States	
28	2:03.56		Graham Smith	Canada	24 August 1978	World Championships	West Berlin, West Germany	
29	2:03.29		Jesse Vassallo	United States	6 July 1979	Pan American Games	San Juan, Puerto Rico	
30	2:03.24		Bill Barrett	United States	1 August 1980	-	Irvine, United States	
31	2:03.01		Jeremy Reingold	South Africa	26 September 1980	-	Cape Town, South Africa	
32	2:02.78		Alex Baumann	Canada	29 July 1981	-	Heidelberg, West Germany	
33	2:02.25		Alex Baumann	Canada	4 October 1982	Commonwealth Games	Brisbane, Australia	
34	2:01.42		Alex Baumann	Canada	4 August 1984	Olympic Games	Los Angeles, United States	
35	2:00.56		Tamás Darnyi	Hungary	23 August 1987	European Championships	Strasbourg, France	
36	2:00.17		Tamás Darnyi	Hungary	25 September 1988	Olympic Games	Seoul, South Korea	
37	2:00.11		David Wharton	United States	20 August 1989	Pan Pacific Championships	Tokyo, Japan	
38	1:59.36		Tamás Darnyi	Hungary	13 January 1991	World Championships	Perth, Australia	
39	1:58.16		Jani Sievinen	Finland	11 September 1994	World Championships	Rome, Italy	
40	1:57.94		Michael Phelps	United States	29 June 2003	Santa Clara Invitational	Santa Clara, United States	
41	1:57.52	sf	Michael Phelps	United States	24 July 2003	World Championships	Barcelona, Spain	
42	1:56.04		Michael Phelps	United States	25 July 2003	World Championships	Barcelona, Spain	
43	1:55.94		Michael Phelps	United States	9 August 2003	US National Championships	College Park, United States	
44	1:55.84		Michael Phelps	United States	20 August 2006	Pan Pacific Championships	Victoria, Canada	
45	1:54.98		Michael Phelps	United States	29 March 2007	World Championships	Melbourne, Australia	
46	1:54.80		Michael Phelps	United States	4 July 2008	US Olympic Trials	Omaha, United States	
47	1:54.23		Michael Phelps	United States	15 August 2008	Olympic Games	Beijing, China	
48	1:54.10		Ryan Lochte	United States	30 July 2009	World Championships	Rome, Italy	
49	1:54.00		Ryan Lochte	United States	28 July 2011	World Championships	Shanghai, China	
50	1:52.69	sf	Léon Marchand	France	30 July 2025	World Championships	Singapore	

=== Short course ===
#	Time		Name	Nationality	Date	Meet	Location	Ref
1	1:57.19		Jani Sievinen	Finland	17 January 1992	-	Kuopio, Finland	
2	1:56.84		Jani Sievinen	Finland	22 January 1993	-	Helsinki, Finland	
3	1:56.62		Jani Sievinen	Finland	7 February 1993	World Cup	Paris, France	
4	1:55.59		Jani Sievinen	Finland	10 February 1993	World Cup	Malmö, Sweden	
5	1:54.65		Jani Sievinen	Finland	21 April 1994	-	Kuopio, Finland	
5	1:54.65	=	Attila Czene	Hungary	23 March 2000	NCAA Division I Championships	Minneapolis, United States	
7	1:53.93		George Bovell	Trinidad and Tobago	25 March 2004	NCAA Division I Championships	East Meadow, United States	
8	1:53.46		László Cseh	Hungary	8 December 2005	European Championships	Trieste, Italy	
9	1:53.31		Ryan Lochte	United States	7 April 2006	World Championships	Shanghai, China	
10	1:53.14		Thiago Pereira	Brazil	18 November 2007	World Cup	Berlin, Germany	
11	1:52.99		László Cseh	Hungary	13 December 2007	European Championships	Debrecen, Hungary	
12	1:51.56		Ryan Lochte	United States	11 April 2008	World Championships	Manchester, United Kingdom	
13	1:51.55		Darian Townsend	South Africa	15 November 2009	World Cup	Berlin, Germany	
14	1:50.08		Ryan Lochte	United States	17 December 2010	World Championships	Dubai, United Arab Emirates	
15	1:49.63		Ryan Lochte	United States	14 December 2012	World Championships	Istanbul, Turkey	
16	1:48.88		Léon Marchand	France	1 November 2024	World Cup	Singapore	

== Women ==
=== Long course ===
#	Time		Name	Nationality	Date	Meet	Location	Ref
1	2:48.2		Patty Kempner	United States	27 April 1957	-	Chicago, United States	
2	2:47.7		Becky Collins	United States	20 July 1958	-	Akron, United States	
3	2:43.2		Sylvia Ruuska	United States	16 August 1958	-	Fresno, United States	
4	2:40.3		Sylvia Ruuska	United States	14 January 1959	-	Hobart, Australia	
5	2:40.1		Donna de Varona	United States	13 May 1961	-	Redding, United States	
6	2:37.1		Donna de Varona	United States	9 July 1961	-	Tenri, Japan	
7	2:35.0		Donna de Varona	United States	12 August 1961	-	Philadelphia, United States	
8	2:33.3		Donna de Varona	United States	18 August 1962	-	Chicago, United States	
9	2:31.8		Donna de Varona	United States	27 July 1963	Los Angeles Invitational	Los Angeles, United States	
10	2:30.1		Donna de Varona	United States	11 July 1964	-	Los Angeles, United States	
11	2:29.9		Donna de Varona	United States	1 August 1964	US National Championships	Los Altos, United States	
12	2:29.0		Lynn Vidali	United States	22 July 1966	-	Los Altos, United States	
13	2:27.8		Claudia Kolb	United States	21 August 1966	-	Lincoln, United States	
14	2:27.5		Claudia Kolb	United States	8 July 1967	Santa Clara International	Santa Clara, United States	
15	2:26.1		Claudia Kolb	United States	30 July 1967	Pan American Games	Winnipeg, Canada	
16	2:23.5		Claudia Kolb	United States	25 August 1967	-	Los Angeles, United States	
17	2:23.07		Shane Gould	Australia	28 August 1972	Olympic Games	Munich, West Germany	
18	2:23.01		Kornelia Ender	East Germany	13 April 1973	-	East Berlin, East Germany	
19	2:20.51		Andrea Hubner	East Germany	4 September 1973	World Championships	Belgrade, Yugoslavia	
20	2:18.97		Ulrike Tauber	East Germany	18 August 1974	European Championships	Vienna, Austria	
21	2:18.83		Ulrike Tauber	East Germany	10 June 1975	East German Championships	Wittenberg, West Germany	
22	2:18.30		Ulrike Tauber	East Germany	12 March 1976	Soviet Union vs East Germany Dual Meet	Tallinn, Soviet Union	
23	2:17.14		Kornelia Ender	East Germany	5 June 1976	East German Championships	East Berlin, East Germany	
24	2:16.96		Ulrike Tauber	East Germany	10 July 1977	-	Leipzig, East Germany	
25	2:15.95		Ulrike Tauber	East Germany	20 August 1977	European Championships	Jönköping, Sweden	
26	2:15.85		Ulrike Tauber	East Germany	28 August 1977	USA vs East Germany Dual Meet	East Berlin, East Germany	
27	2:15.09		Tracy Caulkins	United States	2 August 1978	US National Championships	The Woodlands, United States	
28	2:14.07		Tracy Caulkins	United States	20 August 1978	World Championships	West Berlin, West Germany	
28	2:13.69		Tracy Caulkins	United States	5 January 1980	-	Austin, United States	
29	2:13.00		Petra Schneider	East Germany	24 May 1980	-	East Berlin, East Germany	
30	2:11.73		Ute Geweniger	East Germany	4 July 1981	-	Magdeburg, East Germany	
31	2:11.65		Lin Li	China	30 July 1992	Olympic Games	Barcelona, Spain	
32	2:09.72		Wu Yanyan	China	17 October 1997	Chinese National Games	Shanghai, China	
33	2:08.92		Stephanie Rice	Australia	25 March 2008	Australian Championships	Sydney, Australia	
34	2:08.45		Stephanie Rice	Australia	13 August 2008	Olympic Games	Beijing, China	
35	2:07.03	sf	Ariana Kukors	United States	26 July 2009	World Championships	Rome, Italy	
36	2:06.15		Ariana Kukors	United States	27 July 2009	World Championships	Rome, Italy	
37	2:06.12		Katinka Hosszú	Hungary	3 August 2015	World Championships	Kazan, Russia	
38	2:05.70		Summer McIntosh	Canada	9 June 2025	Canadian Trials	Victoria, Canada	

=== Short course ===
#	Time		Name	Nationality	Date	Meet	Location	Ref
1	2:07.79		Allison Wagner	United States	5 December 1993	World Championships	Palma de Mallorca, Spain	
2	2:06.13		Kirsty Coventry	Zimbabwe	12 April 2008	World Championships	Manchester, United Kingdom	
3	2:06.01		Evelyn Verrasztó	Hungary	6 November 2009	World Cup	Moscow, Russia	
4	2:04.64		Evelyn Verrasztó	Hungary	10 December 2009	European Championships	Istanbul, Turkey	
5	2:04.60		Julia Smit	United States	19 December 2009	Duel in the Pool	Manchester, United Kingdom	
6	2:04.39	h	Katinka Hosszú	Hungary	7 August 2013	World Cup	Eindhoven, Netherlands	
7	2:03.20		Katinka Hosszú	Hungary	7 August 2013	World Cup	Eindhoven, Netherlands	
8	2:02.61		Katinka Hosszú	Hungary	27 August 2014	World Cup	Doha, Qatar	
9	2:02.13		Katinka Hosszú	Hungary	31 August 2014	World Cup	Dubai, United Arab Emirates	
10	2:01.86		Katinka Hosszú	Hungary	6 December 2014	World Championships	Doha, Qatar	
11	2:01.63		Kate Douglass	United States	10 December 2024	World Championships	Budapest, Hungary	
