= Stefan Weinrich =

German swimmer

Personal information
- Born: 18 September 1945 (age 80) Glauchau, Germany

Sport
- Sport: Swimming

Stefan Weinrich (born 18 September 1945) is a German former swimmer. He competed in the men's 400 metre individual medley at the 1964 Summer Olympics, finishing fourth in his heat and not proceeding to the finals.
