= Guillermo Davila (swimmer) =

Mexican swimmer

Personal information
- Born: 2 April 1949 (age 77)

Sport
- Sport: Swimming

Guillermo Davila (born 2 April 1949) is a Mexican former swimmer. He competed in the men's 400 metre individual medley at the 1964 Summer Olympics.
