= Ulrike Tauber =

East German swimmer

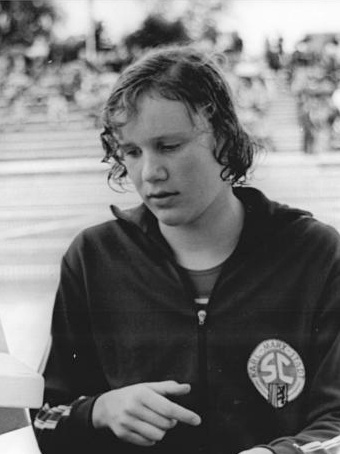
- Ulrike Tauber in 1974

Personal information
- Nationality: East German
- Born: 16 June 1958 (age 68) Karl-Marx-Stadt, Sachsen, East Germany now Germany
- Height: 1.73 m (5 ft 8 in)
- Weight: 61 kg (134 lb)

Sport
- Sport: Swimming
- Strokes: Butterfly; Medley
- Club: SC Karl-Marx-Stadt
Medal record
Women's swimming
Representing East Germany
Olympic Games
Gold medal – first place	1976 Montreal	400 m medley
Silver medal – second place	1976 Montreal	200 m butterfly
World Championships
Gold medal – first place	1975 Cali	400 m medley
Silver medal – second place	1975 Cali	200 m medley
Silver medal – second place	1978 Berlin	400 m medley
Bronze medal – third place	1978 Berlin	200 m medley
European Championships
Gold medal – first place	1974 Vienna	200 m medley
Gold medal – first place	1974 Vienna	400 m medley
Gold medal – first place	1977 Jönköping	200 m medley
Gold medal – first place	1977 Jönköping	400 m medley
Silver medal – second place	1974 Vienna	100 m backstroke
Silver medal – second place	1974 Vienna	200 m backstroke

Ulrike Tauber (born 16 June 1958) is a retired medley and butterfly swimmer from East Germany, who won the gold medal in the women's 400 m individual medley at the 1976 Summer Olympics in Montreal, Quebec, Canada. There she also captured the silver medal in the women's 200 m butterfly. In the 1970s Tauber set numerous world records in the 200 m and 200 m individual medley. In 1974 and 1977, Swimming World magazine awarded Tauber the titles of Swimmer of the Year and European Swimmer of the Year. In 1988 Tauber was inducted into the International Swimming Hall of Fame. It was later revealed that she had used doping during competitions, like many other athletes from the GDR. In 2013, Swimming World stripped her of all titles.

== See also ==
- List of members of the International Swimming Hall of Fame
- List of World Aquatics Championships medalists in swimming (women)

Records
Preceded by (East Germany) Andrea Hubner	Women's 200 metre individual medley world record holder (long course); 18 August 1974 – 5 June 1976	Succeeded by (East Germany) Kornelia Ender
Preceded by (East Germany) Kornelia Ender	Women's 200 metre individual medley world record holder (long course); 10 July 1977 – 2 August 1978	Succeeded by (United States) Tracy Caulkins
Preceded by (East Germany) Gudrun Wegner	Women's 400 metre individual medley world record holder (long course); 21 August 1974 – 1 June 1976	Succeeded by (East Germany) Birgit Treiber
Preceded by (East Germany) Birgit Treiber	Women's 400 metre individual medley world record holder (long course); 24 July 1976 – 23 August 1978	Succeeded by (United States) Tracy Caulkins
