= Philip Bryant =

Australian swimmer

Personal information
- Birth name: Philip Malcolm Bryant
- Born: 27 March 1974 (age 51); Sydney, New South Wales, Australia

Sport
- Sport: Swimming
- Strokes: Medley

Philip Malcolm Bryant (born 27 March 1974) is an Australian swimmer. He competed in the men's 400 metre individual medley at the 1992 Summer Olympics.
