= George Harrison (swimmer) =

American swimmer (1939–2011)

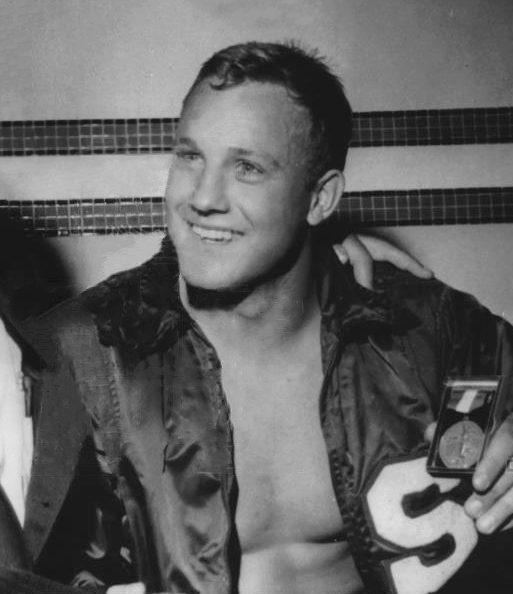
- Harrison in 1960

Personal information
- Full name: George Prifold Harrison
- National team: United States
- Born: April 9, 1939 Berkeley, California, U.S.
- Died: 3 October 2011 (aged 72) Moraga, California, U.S.
- Occupation: Investment Broker
- Height: 6 ft 0 in (1.83 m)
- Weight: 179 lb (81 kg)
- Spouse: Susan Jean Murray

Sport
- Sport: Swimming
- Strokes: Freestyle
- Club: Santa Clara Swim Club
- College team: Stanford University
- Coach: George Haines (Santa Clara); James Gaughran (Stanford)
Medal record
Representing the United States
Olympic Games
Gold medal – first place	1960 Rome	4×200 m freestyle
Pan American Games
Silver medal – second place	1959 Chicago	400 m freestyle

George Prifold Harrison (April 9, 1939 – October 3, 2011) was an American competition swimmer, who competed for Stanford University, a 1960 Rome Olympic champion in the 4x200 freestyle relay, and a former world record-holder in three events. After ending his swimming career, he would work for Lee & Associates in Pleasanton, California, as an investment and industrial broker.

Harrison was born in Berkeley, California on April 9, 1939 to Robert Darlington and Caroline Harrison and attended Lafayette's Acalanes High School. Prior to college, he competed and trained with the exceptional program offered by the Santa Clara Swim Club under Hall of Fame Coach George Haines. In 1965, he graduated from Stanford University, where he swam under Hall of Fame Coach James Gaughran and was a member of Beta Theta Pi fraternity.

== 1960 Rome Olympic gold ==
Harrison won the 200-meter freestyle event at the 1960 Olympic trials to qualify for the U.S. team.

He competed at the 1960 Summer Olympics in Rome, where he received a gold medal as the lead-off swimmer of the winning U.S. team in the 4×200-meter freestyle relay. Harrison, together with his American relay teammates Dick Blick, Mike Troy and Jeff Farrell, set a new world record of 8:10.2 in the event final. At the Olympics, Harrison was managed by head U.S. Coach Gus Stager.

Harrison married Susan Jean Murray at her parents' home on the afternoon of July 1, 1961 at St. Stephens Episcopal Church. After a honeymoon in Carmel, the couple planned to reside in Carmel. Both were former graduates of Acalanes High School, where they met. He would remain married to Susan throughout his life, and the couple would have two daughters, a son, and two grand-daughters.

From 1958-1960, Harrison took first place in the AAU individual medley for successive years, setting an American record in short course each time. Individually, Harrison won a silver medal in the 400-meter freestyle at the 1959 Pan American Games. He also held the world record in 200-meter individual medley (long course) from August 24, 1956, to July 19, 1958, and the world record in the 400-meter individual medley (long course) from June 24 to July 22, 1960.

== Post-swimming career ==
He spent most of his career with Lee & Associates at Pleasanton, California, working in investment and industrial brokerage. At the time of his death, on October 3, 2011, from complications during surgery, he lived in Moraga, California.

== Honors ==
Harrison was inducted into the Stanford University Hall of Fame.

== See also ==
- List of Olympic medalists in swimming (men)
- List of Stanford University people
- World record progression 200 metres individual medley
- World record progression 400 metres individual medley
- World record progression 4 × 200 metres freestyle relay
