= Roberto Cassio =

Italian swimmer

Personal information
- Born: 8 January 1968 (age 58) Rome, Italy

Sport
- Sport: Swimming

Roberto Cassio (born 8 January 1968) is an Italian swimmer. He competed in the men's 200 metre individual medley at the 1988 Summer Olympics.
