= Bill Stapleton (swimmer) =

American swimmer (born 1965)

Personal information
- Full name: William Joseph Stapleton III
- Nickname: "Bill"
- National team: United States
- Born: July 12, 1965 (age 61) Edwardsville, Illinois
- Education: University of Texas (B.A., MBA, J.D.)
- Occupation: Sports Management
- Height: 5 ft 11 in (1.80 m)
- Weight: 163 lb (74 kg)

Sport
- Sport: Swimming
- Events: 200m IM, 200m Butterfly
- Strokes: Individual medley, Butterfly
- Club: Edwardsville YMCA; Sugar Creek Swim Club (Greater St. Louis, MO); Longhorn Swim Club (Austin)
- College team: University of Texas
- Coach: Jim Tynan (Sugar Creek Swim Club); Eddie Reese (U Texas)
Medal record
Men's swimming
Representing the United States
Pan American Games
Gold medal – first place	1987 Indianapolis	200 m butterfly
Gold medal – first place	1987 Indianapolis	200 m medley

William Joseph Stapleton (born July 12, 1965) is an American former competition swimmer who competed for the University of Texas and represented the United States at the 1988 Summer Olympics in Seoul, South Korea, where he competed in the men's 200-meter individual medley. He later worked in Sports Management, founding his own business Capital Sports Adventures.

== Early life and swimming ==
Bill Stapleton was born July 12, 1965 in Edwardsville, Illinois to father William Joseph Stapleton II and mother Brookie Stapleton. Bill Stapleton graduated Edwardsville High School in Edwardsville, Illinois in June 1983, where he competed in swimming and twice won titles at the Illinois State Championships. Young Bill began competitive swim training around 1975 at age 10, swimming first with the Edwardsville YMCA, roughly through the age of 15 in 1980. In Club competition, beginning around 1980, he trained and competed with the Sugar Creek Swim Club of St. Louis County about 35 miles from Edwardsville, where he was coached by Jim Tynan who formerly swam and dove for Loyola University. Stapleton credited Tynan as the coach that most improved his times and made him a world ranked competitor. The switch to the Sugar Creek Club took sacrifices including a longer commute, which required Stapleton to awake at 4:00 am to make early practice. The practices were likely more intense, with more distance and more demanding intervals. At Loyola, in addition to diving, Coach Tynan excelled in the individual medley and stroke events, giving him insight as to how best develop Stapleton's strengths in the individual medley. Tynan believed Stapleton's strengths in butterfly could be improved with additional upper body strength training.

As voted by the National Interscholastic Swimming Association, during his High School career, Stapleton was an All American in swimming in both the 500 freestyle and 100 butterfly events. At the 1983 Illinois High School State Championship, he won the 500 freestyle title. Stapleton held an Edwardsville High record in the 500 freestyle of 4:33.36. He was a four-time state medalist in boys swimming, including championships in the 200-yard individual medley his junior season in 1982 and the 500-yard freestyle his senior season in 1983. He also took sixth in the 100-yard butterfly in 1982 and second in the 100-yard butterfly in 1983. Stapleton won four state titles during his high school career, which in 1982 included the 200 Individual Medley as a Junior, and the 500-yard freestyle his Senior year in 1983.

Competing in the US Swimming Senior Championships in the 200 fly and 400 IM in 1983, he won a spot on the Junior National team, allowing him to compete with the Juniors from the Soviet Union at a meet in Walnut Creek, California. He suffered from a shoulder injury prior to enrolling at the University of Texas.

== International competition highlights ==
While at Texas, while participating in the 1987 Pan American games in Indianapolis, he won gold medals in both the 200 IM and 200 butterfly. At the 1986 Goodwill Games in Moscow, Russia, Stapleton finished second in the 200 IM, winning a silver, while placing second to Vadim Yaroshuk of Russia.

== 1988 Seoul Olympics ==
Stapleton qualified for the 1988 Seoul Olympics by placing second in the 200-meter individual medley at the U.S. Olympic trials in mid-August in Austin, Texas. He swam an outstanding qualifying time of 2:02.14, the second fastest qualifying time ever swum for the event. Event record holder Dave Holden placed first, though Stapleton led part of the way.

He competed in the B Final of the men's 200-meter individual medley event at the 1988 Seoul Olympics, and finished in sixteenth place overall with a time of 2:06.82.

=== University of Texas ===
Stapleton swam for the University of Texas on an NCAA scholarship beginning in the Fall of 1983 where he competed in swimming under Hall of Fame Head Coach Eddie Reese. Reese coached the U. Texas Longhorns swim team from 1978-2024. Stapleton served as team captain, and was a collegiate All American four times during his swimming career at U. Texas. He continued to swim and compete at a high level through 1990 after graduating University of Texas, likely during graduate school representing the Longhorn Swim Club, affiliated with the University of Texas.

=== Careers ===
Stapleton completed a Masters in Business Administration from the University of Texas, and then a degree in law. He subsequently worked in Sports Management while practicing law at Brown McCarroll & Oaks Hartline. Stapleton was the agent for cyclist Lance Armstrong's, a multiple Tour de France winner, for nearly 20 years, including the time of Armstrong's doping scandal. After leaving Brown McCarroll and Oaks, where he initially worked as Armstrong's agent, he founded the company Capital Sports Adventures retaining Armstrong as a primary client.

Stapleton was engaged to Laura Lee Prather of Houston, and the couple planned to wed in Austin in May of 1994 in Austin.

Stapleton was portrayed by American actor Lee Pace in the 2015 film The Program, a drama about football.

=== Honors ===
Stapleton was inducted into the Edwardsville High School Athletic Hall of Fame in October, 1988.

== See also ==
- List of University of Texas at Austin alumni
