= Tamás Darnyi =

Hungarian swimmer (born 1967)

Personal information
- Full name: Darnyi Tamás
- Nationality: Hungarian
- Born: 3 June 1967 (age 59) Budapest
- Height: 1.86 m (6 ft 1 in)

Sport
- Sport: Swimming
- Strokes: Individual medley
- Club: Újpesti TE
Medal record
Men's swimming
Representing Hungary
Olympic Games
Gold medal – first place	1988 Seoul	200 m medley
Gold medal – first place	1988 Seoul	400 m medley
Gold medal – first place	1992 Barcelona	200 m medley
Gold medal – first place	1992 Barcelona	400 m medley
World Championships (LC)
Gold medal – first place	1986 Madrid	200 m medley
Gold medal – first place	1986 Madrid	400 m medley
Gold medal – first place	1991 Perth	200 m medley
Gold medal – first place	1991 Perth	400 m medley
Bronze medal – third place	1991 Perth	200 m butterfly
European Championships (LC)
Gold medal – first place	1985 Sofia	200 m medley
Gold medal – first place	1985 Sofia	400 m medley
Gold medal – first place	1987 Strasbourg	200 m medley
Gold medal – first place	1987 Strasbourg	400 m medley
Gold medal – first place	1989 Bonn	200 m butterfly
Gold medal – first place	1989 Bonn	200 m medley
Gold medal – first place	1989 Bonn	400 m medley
Gold medal – first place	1993 Sheffield	400 m medley
European Junior Championships (LC)
Gold medal – first place	1982 Innsbruck	200 m butterfly
Gold medal – first place	1982 Innsbruck	200 m medley
Gold medal – first place	1982 Innsbruck	400 m medley
Silver medal – second place	1982 Innsbruck	200 m backstroke
Bronze medal – third place	1982 Innsbruck	100 m butterfly

Tamás Darnyi (born 3 June 1967 in Budapest) is a Hungarian retired male swimmer. He is considered by many to be one of the greatest medley swimmers in history. He won four gold medals at two Olympic Games (1988 and 1992) and was unbeaten in the individual medley events from 1985 until his retirement in 1993. He is the first swimmer ever to swim the 200 m medley (long course) in less than 2 minutes.

== Career ==
Possibly one of the greatest medley swimmers of all time, Tamás Darnyi dominated his speciality between 1985 and 1993. He won the 200/400 m medley double at the 1988 and 1992 Olympics, the 1986 and 1991 World Championships, and the 1985, 1987 and 1989 European Championships. He also won a European title in the 200 m butterfly, and a world bronze in the same event.

A teen talent, Darnyi might have competed at the 1984 Olympics, but both the Eastern European boycott and a personal accident prevented this. He was hit by a snowball in the left eye, which left him blind in one eye. After recovering, he started an unbeaten streak in medley events that lasted from 1985 to 1993. During that period, he bettered the world record in both medley events three times. After his final European title in 1993 (400 medley), he retired and managed a Budapest sports school.

He was named Male World Swimmer of the Year in 1987 and 1991 by Swimming World magazine. He was elected Hungarian Sportsman of the Year in 1986, 1987, 1988, 1990 and 1992 for his achievements.

== See also ==
- List of members of the International Swimming Hall of Fame
- World record progression 200 metres medley
- World record progression 400 metres medley
- List of multiple Olympic gold medalists

Records
Preceded by (Canada) Alex Baumann	Men's 200 metre individual medley world record holder (long course); 23 August 1987 – 20 August 1989	Succeeded by (United States) David Wharton
Preceded by (United States) David Wharton	Men's 200 metre individual medley world record holder (long course); 13 January 1991 – 11 September 1994	Succeeded by (Finland) Jani Sievinen
Preceded by (United States) David Wharton	Men's 400 metre individual medley world record holder (long course); 19 August 1987 – 11 September 1994	Succeeded by (United States) Tom Dolan
Awards
Preceded by (United States) Matt Biondi	World Swimmer of the Year; 1987	Succeeded by (United States) Matt Biondi
Preceded by (United States) Mike Barrowman	World Swimmer of the Year; 1991	Succeeded by (Russia) Yevgeny Sadovyi
Preceded by (Hungary) Attila Mizsér	Hungarian Sportsman of The Year; 1986-1988	Succeeded by (Hungary) László Fábián
Preceded by (Hungary) László Fábián	Hungarian Sportsman of The Year; 1990	Succeeded by (Hungary) István Kovács
Preceded by (Hungary) István Kovács	Hungarian Sportsman of The Year; 1992	Succeeded by (Hungary) Antal Kovács
Preceded by (West Germany) Michael Groß	European Swimmer of the Year; 1987 – 1988	Succeeded by (Italy) Giorgio Lamberti
Preceded by (United Kingdom) Adrian Moorhouse	European Swimmer of the Year; 1991	Succeeded by (Russia) Yevgeny Sadovyi
