= Dick Roth =

American swimmer (1947–2025)

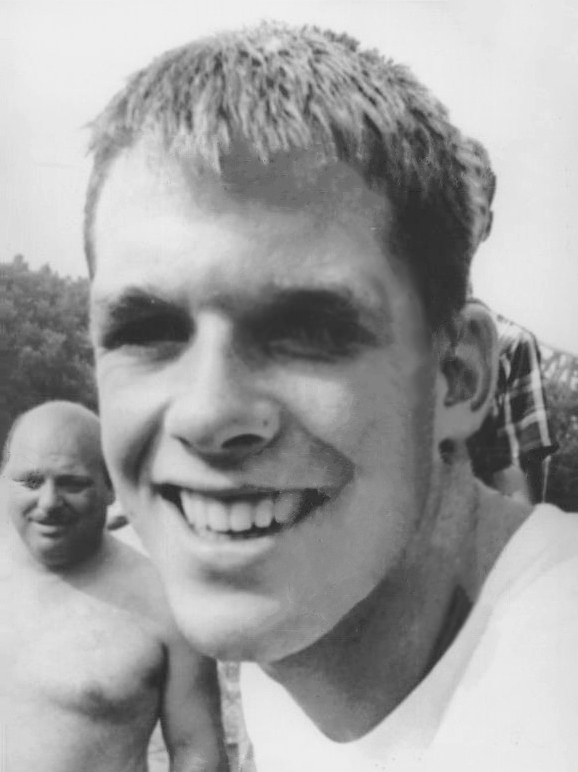
- Roth in 1964

Personal information
- Full name: Richard William Roth
- Nickname: "Dick"
- National team: United States
- Born: September 26, 1947 Palo Alto, California, U.S.
- Died: September 23, 2025 (aged 77) Hood River, Oregon, U.S.
- Height: 6 ft 0 in (1.83 m)
- Weight: 185 lb (84 kg)

Sport
- Sport: Swimming
- Strokes: Individual medley
- Club: Santa Clara Swim Club
- College team: Stanford University
- Coach: James Gaughran (Stanford); Bob Gaughran (Menlo-Atherton High)
Medal record
Representing the United States
Olympic Games
| Gold medal – first place | 1964 Tokyo | 400 m medley |
Universiade
| Gold medal – first place | 1965 Budapest | 400 m medley |
| Gold medal – first place | 1965 Budapest | 4×200 m freestyle |

Richard William Roth (September 26, 1947 – September 23, 2025) was an American competition swimmer, Olympic champion, and world record holder in two events - the long course 200 m and 400 m individual medley.

== High school swimming ==
Roth set his first age group record in swimming at age 12. In high school he swam for Menlo-Atherton where he won eight Southern Pacific Athletic League High School Conference titles under Coach Robert K. Gaughran, a former swim team captain and water polo player at College of the Pacific (and younger brother of Roth's Hall of Fame Stanford swim coach Jim Gaughran). Roth also served as high school student body president and was on the baseball and water polo teams.

While in high school he also swam for the Santa Clara Swim Club under Hall of Fame coach George Haines.

Dick was also the older brother of swimmer Don Roth, who was US national champion.

== 1964 Olympic Gold ==
In October 1964, Roth swam in the 1964 Olympic Games in Tokyo, Japan, where he won the gold medal for his first-place finish in the men's 400-meter individual medley, setting a new world record of 4:45.4 in the event final. Roth came from behind in the last 50 meters, exciting the Tokyo crowd, and finishing only a few feet ahead of the second place finisher. Unbeknownst to the crowd Roth had suffered an attack of acute appendicitis the night before but refused surgery so he could compete and subsequently take the gold.

== International competition ==
In March 1965 Roth was diagnosed with severe tendinitis in his arms and shoulders, likely brought on by the demanding mechanics of the individual medley. He was unable to defend his American records in the 200 and 400 Individual Medley events at the AAU Nationals the following month in New Haven, Connecticut.

Fully recovered from his previous tendonitis, Roth won two golds in the 1965 Summer Universiade in August in Budapest, Hungary, one in the 400-meter individual medley, and one in the 4x 200-meter freestyle relay.

== College swimming ==
While swimming for Stanford University, he was a two-time individual NCAA champion, winning the 200- and 400-yard individual medley. Roth's Stanford Coach Jim Gaughran had also been a Medley swimmer at Stanford, and his knowledge of diverse stroke mechanics may have helped him mentor Roth.

Swimming in three NCAA championships, Dick won the 200, and 400-yd individual medley events and was a member of a winning relay team. He held American records in four Individual Medley distances at one time including the 200-yd, 400-yd, 200-meter, and 400-meter events, and was a member of five American record winning relay teams. Between 1963-67, Roth was considered by many coaches to be America's top performing Individual Medley swimmer.

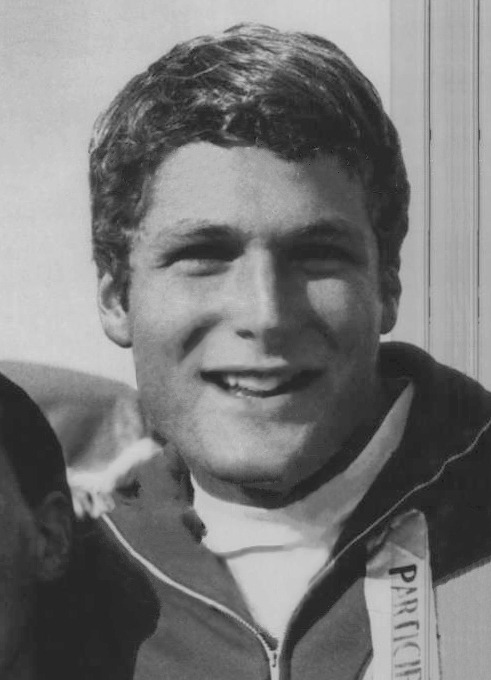
Teammate, G. Buckingham, '68

One of Roth's Stanford teammates was future 200-meter Olympic silver medalist Greg Buckingham, with whom he swam a winning 800-meter freestyle relay in NCAA and AAU record time at the Stanford Relays in January 1967. Both Roth and Buckingham were swimming standouts at Menlo-Atherton High School, and both won Olympic medals in the individual medley.

Dick did not swim all four years at Stanford and retired from his competitive swimming career at 19. He graduated in 1969.

== Honors ==
In 1965, Roth received the World Swimmer of the Year Award from Swimming World, and the "Athlete of the Year" award from his hometown paper, the Peninsula Times-Tribune.

As a highlight to his career, Dick was inducted into the International Swimming Hall of Fame in 1987, after having also been inducted into the Stanford University Athletic Hall of Fame.

== Death ==
Roth died on September 23, 2025, aged 77.

== See also ==
- List of members of the International Swimming Hall of Fame
- List of Olympic medalists in swimming (men)
- List of Stanford University people
- World record progression 200 metres individual medley
- World record progression 400 metres individual medley

Records
| Preceded by Gerhard Hetz | Men's 400-meter individual medley world record-holder (long course); July 31, 1964 – April 3, 1968 | Succeeded by Andrei Dunayev |
| Preceded by Edward Stickles | Men's 200-meter individual medley world record-holder (long course); August 2, 1964 – July 24, 1966 | Succeeded by Greg Buckingham |
