= Edward Stickles =

American swimmer (born 1942)

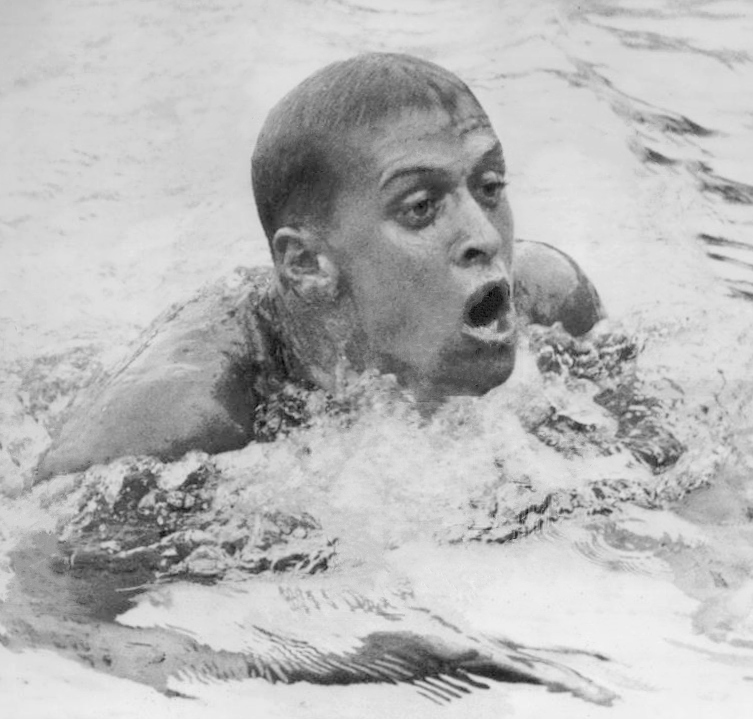
- Stickles in 1962

Personal information
- Full name: Edward Arnold Stickles'
- Nickname: "Ted"
- Nationality: American
- Born: April 7, 1942 (age 84) San Francisco, California, U.S.

Sport
- Sport: Swimming
- Event: 200, 400 Individual Medley
- Strokes: Medley swimming
- Club: San Mateo Marlins
- College team: Indiana University '65
- Coach: James Counsilman (IU)

Edward Arnold "Ted" Stickles (born April 7, 1942) is an American former competition swimmer and former world record-holder who competed for Indiana University. A highly skilled competitor in all four strokes, he was the first swimmer to go under two minutes for the 200 Individual Medley.

== Early life ==
Stickles was born April 7, 1942, in San Francisco. He attended and competed in swimming for nearby San Mateo's Hillsdale High, where he was voted Most Valuable Player all four years, and at one time held every varsity swimming record at the school. As a Junior in July 1959 at the National AAU Outdoor Swimming Championship in Los Altos he placed second in the 200-meter Individual Medley with an AAU record time of 2:26.7. In August, 1959, at the Redwood City AAU Championships, Stickles came within .5 seconds of breaking the American record in the 200-yard Individual Medley with his time of 2:08.1, which broke the Pacific Association record. In club competition, Stickles swam for the San Mateo Marlins.

== Indiana University ==
Stickles swam with James Counsilman's Indiana University team from 1962 to 1965, and as a three-time All American earned Varsity letters in 1962, 1963, and 1964. Between the years 1962–1964, he captured five championships in Big Ten competition in the 200 and 400 Individual Medley events. In National AAU championships in both the 200 and 400 Individual Medley, he won six championships. In the 200 and 400 Individual Medley, he held both American and World records. At one point during his career, he and his roommate, Chet Jastremski, held a total of seven world records. Stickles broke a total of nine world records in the individual medley in the early 1960s.

=== Records ===
- Four world records – 400m individual medley
- Eight U.S. National AAU Championships – 200 m individual medley, 400m individual medley

=== Honors ===
Stickles was inducted into the International Swimming Hall of Fame in 1995 and into the Indiana University Hall of Fame in 1998.

== Coaching career ==
After graduating Indiana in 1965, Stickles coached the Libya, North Africa National Swimming team, and then served for one year as an Assistant Coach at his alma mater, Indiana University.

Stickles was the head swimming coach for the Illinois Fighting Illini swimming team at the University of Illinois for two years.

In August, 1972, Athletic Director Carl Maddox named Stickles as the new Head coach of the LSU Tigers where he served from 1973 to 1980 and later coached the LSU Lady Tigers in 1980. In a long, and arduous selection process, Director Maddox believed he had found an outstanding coach, who would best served the university. Stickles replaced Dr. Ivan Harless, who had served as coach two years. Stickles later worked as a managing Director for all athletic events at Louisiana State.

== Personal life ==
Stickles now resides in Louisiana with wife and two children. His sister Terri is a former Olympic swimmer. Ted developed tendinitis in his elbow and consequently missed the 1964 Olympics – otherwise Ted and Terri would have been the first brother and sister to make an Olympic team.

Records
Preceded by Dennis Rounsaville	Men's 400-meter individual medley world record-holder (long course); July 1, 1961 – May 24, 1962	Succeeded by Gerhard Hetz
Preceded by Gerhard Hetz	Men's 400-meter individual medley world record-holder (long course); June 30, 1962 – October 12, 1963	Succeeded by Gerhard Hetz
Preceded by John McGill	Men's 200-meter individual medley world record-holder (long course); July 23, 1960 – August 19, 1961	Succeeded by Dick Roth

== See also ==
- List of members of the International Swimming Hall of Fame
- List of Indiana University (Bloomington) people
- World record progression 200 metres individual medley
- World record progression 400 metres individual medley
