= Laurent Journet =

French swimmer

Personal information
- Born: 5 February 1970 (age 56) Villemomble, France

Sport
- Sport: Swimming
- Club: Villeparis natation

Laurent Journet (born 5 February 1970) is a French swimmer. He competed in the men's 400 metre individual medley at the 1988 Summer Olympics.
