= Terry Buck =

Australian swimmer and coach

Personal information
- Full name: Terrence William Buck
- Nickname: "Terry"
- National team: Australia
- Born: 6 July 1943 Sydney
- Died: 7 March 2005 (aged 61) Tweed River, New South Wales

Sport
- Sport: Swimming
- Strokes: Medley

Terence William Buck (6 July 1943 – 7 March 2005) was an Australian swimmer and coach. He represented Australia at the 1964 Summer Olympics in the 400m individual medley and placed eighth. He was the first Australian swimmer to first participate at the Olympics as both an athlete and a coach. He was head coach in the 1984 Summer Olympics, and team manager in 1992 and 1996. Buck was also a surf lifesaver and a life member of the Clovelly Surf Club in New South Wales. He died in a tractor accident on his farm, leaving behind his wife Laraine and three daughters.
