= José de Rocha =

Portuguese sprinter

Personal information
- Nationality: Portuguese
- Born: 15 August 1936
- Died: 7 February 2015 (aged 78)

Sport
- Sport: Sprinting
- Event: 100 metres

José de Rocha (15 August 1936 – 7 February 2015) was a Portuguese sprinter. He competed in the men's 100 metres at the 1964 Summer Olympics.
