= Gerhard Hetz =

German swimmer (1942–2012)

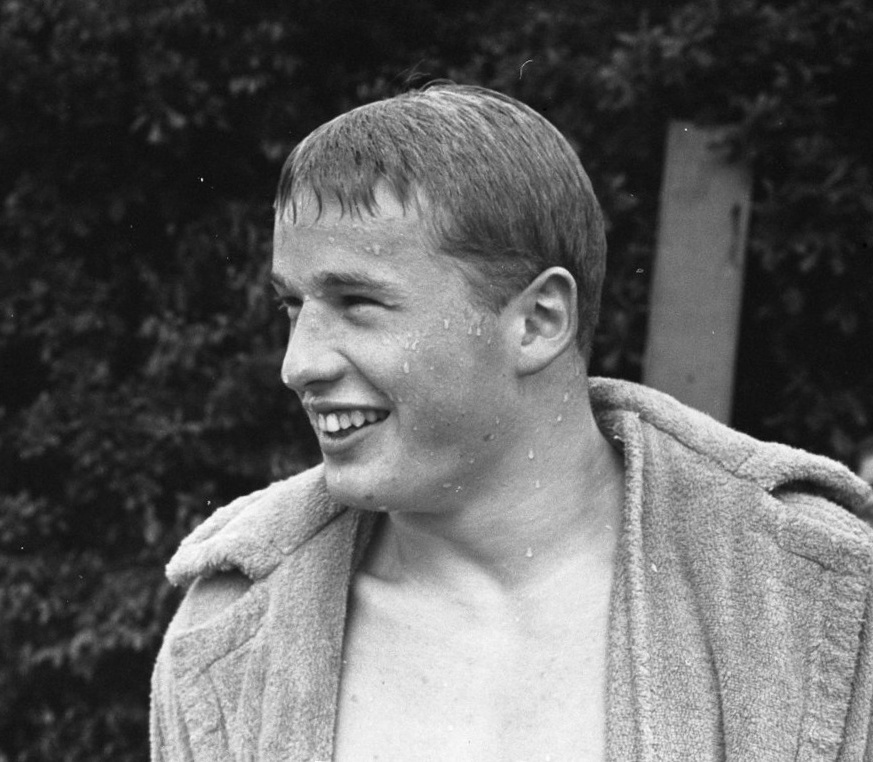
- Gerhard Hetz in 1962

Personal information
- Full name: Gerhard Hetz
- Nationality: German
- Born: 13 July 1942 Hof, Bavaria, Germany
- Died: 19 May 2012 (aged 69) Barra de Navidad, Jalisco, Mexico
- Height: 1.77 m (5 ft 10 in)
- Weight: 70 kg (150 lb)

Sport
- Sport: Swimming
- Club: SV Hof, Hof an der Saale
Medal record
Men's swimming
Representing Germany
Olympic Games
Silver medal – second place	1964 Tokyo	4×200 m freestyle relay
Bronze medal – third place	1964 Tokyo	400 m individual medley

Gerhard Hetz (German pronunciation: [ˈɡeːɐ̯haʁt ˈhɛts]; 13 July 1942 – 19 May 2012) was a German Olympic swimmer. He competed in the 1960 and 1964 Summer Olympics and won a silver medal in the 4 × 200 m freestyle relay and a bronze medal in the 400 m individual medley in 1964.

He set two world records in the 400 m individual medley, in 1962 and 1963. In 1962 he was selected as the German Sportspersonality of the Year. After retirement from competitions he became a successful swimming coach at Blau-Weiß Bochum, SSF Bonn (1968–1975) and then SV Rhenania Köln (1975–1991), training such swimmers as Rainer Henkel, Werner Lampe and Peter Sitt. However, he was also criticized for his harsh training methods.

He married a Mexican national and moved to Guadalajara, Jalisco, where he was invited to coach at Club Atlas (1994-1998). As head coach, he introduced Mexican swimming to a new era of principles in athletic training design, periodization, and athlete assessment. The program was short lived, yet highly successful. It produced around two to three new generations of internationally ranked swimmers, managing to position them among among the top competitors of the CCCAN Championships (Central American and Caribbean Swimming Confederation). Some of the athletes continued onto Division 1-2 NCAA schools under swimming scholarships. His work left a long lasting imprint on Mexican swimming.

He retired and passed away in Barra de Navidad, Jalisco, Mexico, where he was running a hotel with his wife. They had three children.

Records
Preceded by (United States) Ted Stickles	Men's 400 metre individual medley world record holder (long course); May 20, 1962 – June 30, 1962	Succeeded by (United States) Ted Stickles
Preceded by (United States) Ted Stickles	Men's 400 metre individual medley world record holder (long course); October 12, 1963 – July 31, 1964	Succeeded by (United States) Dick Roth
