= Dave Johnson (swim coach) =

Canadian sports coach

Dave Johnson (born 1951 in Montreal) is the former head coach for Swimming Canada, serving in that capacity from 1993 to 2004. His twin brother Tom is currently a coach for Swim Canada. Dave Johnson is currently the head coach of the Cascade Swim Club in Calgary.

Johnson became head coach in 1988 after Don Talbot was dismissed by the Canadian Olympic Committee. Johnson oversaw the coaching of the national swim program for three Olympic Games: Atlanta (1996), Sydney (2000) and Athens (2004).

Following the Athens Games, Mark Tewksbury suggested there was a lack of accountability at Swimming Canada, and that Johnson was given too much power, noting that Canada's success in the pool during the 1980s and early 1990s was due to regional swim clubs rather than the national swim centres that were in place in 2004.

Shortly after the Athens Olympics, Swimming Canada president Rob Colburn dismissed Johnson. Johnson said that his firing represented "a knee-jerk reaction" to a problem that has been coming for quite some time.

Johnson was succeeded by Pierre Lafontaine, a former Talbot protégé, and Team Canada turned in improved results at the 2005 World Aquatics Championships.

== Appointment of Canada's first female Olympic swim coach ==
Johnson appointed Shauna Nolden as Canada's first female Olympic swim coach on June 4, 2000.

The appointment was criticized by the Canadian Swimming Coaches Association, as Nolden was not selected on pre-determined criteria and results. Nolden responded saying "I'm sorry it [the mudslinging] is out there. It casts a shadow on a really great thing". "Dave Johnson is extremely professional, as am I. You don't make an appointment to an Olympic team and risk the performance of the team." Johnson defended it as an affirmative-action move, as federal government funding agency Sport Canada was pushing national sport bodies to have females make up 30-percent of coaching ranks by 2004, and described Nolden as a "trailblazer personality".
