= Fernando Matos =

Portuguese judoka

Personal information
- Nationality: Portuguese
- Born: 1 April 1941 (age 83)
- Occupation: Judoka

Sport
- Sport: Judo

Fernando Matos (born 1 April 1941) is a Portuguese judoka. He competed in the men's middleweight event at the 1964 Summer Olympics.
