= David Wharton =

American swimmer (born 1969)

Personal information
- Full name: David Lee Wharton
- Nickname: "Dave"
- National team: United States
- Born: May 19, 1969 (age 57) Abington, Pennsylvania, U.S.
- Height: 6 ft 0 in (1.83 m)
- Weight: 174 lb (79 kg)

Sport
- Sport: Swimming
- Strokes: Butterfly, individual medley
- College team: University of Southern California
- Coach: Dick Shoulberg; Germantown Prep; Peter Daland; USC
Medal record
Men's swimming
Representing the United States
Olympic Games
Silver medal – second place	1988 Seoul	400 m medley
Pan Pacific Championships
Gold medal – first place	1987 Brisbane	200 m medley
Gold medal – first place	1987 Brisbane	400 m medley
Gold medal – first place	1989 Tokyo	200 m medley
Gold medal – first place	1989 Tokyo	400 m medley
Silver medal – second place	1989 Tokyo	200 m butterfly
Silver medal – second place	1991 Edmonton	200 m butterfly
Silver medal – second place	1991 Edmonton	400 m medley
Bronze medal – third place	1991 Edmonton	200 m medley

David Lee "Dave" Wharton (born May 19, 1969) is an American former competition swimmer, 1988 Olympic silver medalist, and former world record-holder in two events. During his competition swimming career, Wharton set world records in both the 200-meter and 400-meter individual medley events.

== Swimming career ==
=== Germantown Academy ===
Wharton was born on May 9, in Abington, Pennsylvania. He was diagnosed with a 50% hearing loss, not long after his birth and began wearing a hearing aid as a toddler. He started swimming around the age of six at the Warminster Swim Club in Pennsylvania. He was later mentored by Dick Shoulberg, the long serving ASCA Hall of Fame Head Coach at Fort Washington's Germantown Academy who had managed Germantown swimmers since around 1969. Wharton attended, graduated and swam for Germantown, and by 1990 was one of four Olympians Shoulberg had coached at the school. At Germantown, Wharton also benefitted from a solid dry land training program as part of his swim training. Another Germantown Academy graduate, Trina Radke, also swam in the 1988 Olympics with Wharton. Wharton set Germantown school records in the 500-yard freestyle at 4:22.4, the 200-yard freestyle at 1:38.2, and the 200-yard IM at 1:47.1. While at Germantown, Wharton set National prep school records in the 200 IM and 500 freestyle at the 1986 Eastern Championships.

=== International competition ===
He achieved his first recognition in international swimming as an 18-year-old at the 1987 Pan Pacific Swimming Championships in Brisbane, Australia, where he won gold medals in both the 200- and 400-meter individual medley events. He was recognized as the American Swimmer of the Year, together with Janet Evans, by Swimming World Magazine in 1987.

He repeated his exceptional performance in international competition at the 1989 Pan Pacific Swimming Championships in Tokyo, again winning gold medals in the 200- and 400-meter individual medley events, as well as a silver medal in the 200-meter butterfly. At the 1991 Pan Pacifics, he won a bronze in the 200-meter butterfly, a silver in the 400-meter medley, and a bronze in the 200-meter medley.

== 1988, 1992 Olympics ==
Wharton represented the United States at the 1988 Summer Olympics in Seoul, South Korea. He received a silver medal for his second-place performance in the men's 400-meter individual medley, in which he recorded a time of 4:17.36 in the event final. He also competed in the B Final of the men's 200-meter individual medley, finishing ninth overall with a time of 2:03.50.

At the 1992 Summer Olympics in Barcelona, Spain, Wharton again competed in the men's 400-meter individual medley, bettering his 1988 Olympic time with a 4:17.26 and finishing fourth overall. He also swam in the men's 200-meter butterfly, advancing to the B Final and posting a time of 2:01.08.

=== USC ===
Wharton attended the University of Southern California (USC), enrolling in January 1988, where he swam for the USC Trojans swimming and diving team under Hall of Fame Coach Peter Daland. From 1988-1991 he competed in National Collegiate Athletic Association (NCAA) and Pacific-10 Conference competition where he was recognized as the Pac-10 Male Swimmer of the Year all four of his college years. As only a USC Freshman at the April 1988 NCAA Swimming Championships in Indianapolis, he broke the American record for the 400 IM with a 3:42.23, also won the 200-meter IM, and took second in the 200-meter butterfly. During his years at USC, he won three NCAA national championships in the 200-yard individual medley (1988–1990) and four more NCAA championships in the 400-yard individual medley (1988–1991).

== Life after swimming ==
Wharton later completed graduate school at The Ohio State University, working as their assistant swim coach. He received a masters’ in sports management, and met Tammy Hunt, a member of the school’s synchro swim team, whom he would later marry. In 1997 Wharton became Natatorium Director and coached swimming at the New Albany High School through at least 2008. In 2001, he worked as Parks and Recreation Director for the New Albany-Plain Local Joint Park District, and later worked as the New Albany Aquatics Center director. In 2008, he was inducted into the Bucks County Sports Hall of Fame.

== See also ==
- List of Olympic medalists in swimming (men)
- List of University of Southern California people
- World record progression 200 metres individual medley
- World record progression 400 metres individual medley

Records
Preceded by Tamás Darnyi	Men's 200-meter individual medley world record-holder (long course); August 20, 1989 – January 13, 1991	Succeeded by Tamás Darnyi
Preceded by Alex Baumann	Men's 400-meter individual medley world record-holder (long course); August 14, 1987 – August 19, 1987	Succeeded by Tamás Darnyi
