= Robert Baird (swimmer) =

Canadian swimmer

Personal information
- Full name: Robert Stephen Baird
- National team: Canada
- Born: January 3, 1973 (age 53) Ottawa, Ontario
- Height: 1.85 m (6 ft 1 in)
- Weight: 72 kg (159 lb)

Sport
- Sport: Swimming
- Strokes: Individual medley
- Club: Kingfish Swim Club

Robert Stephen Baird (born January 3, 1973) is a Canadian former competition swimmer who swam in the 1992 Summer Olympics in Barcelona, Spain, where he finished in 16th position in the men's 400-metre individual medley.
