= Jenő Tihanyi =

Canadian swimming coach

Dr. Jeno 'Doc' Tihanyi (Hungarian: Tihanyi Jenő; 1936 - March 4, 2007) was a Canadian swim coach inducted into the Canadian Olympic Hall of Fame in 2004. He was the fourth coach in Canadian History to receive such an honour. He was named Ontario University Athletics (OUA) Coach of the Year in 1990 and OWIAA Coach of the Year in 1994. He was best known for coaching famed Individual Medley swimmer Alex Baumann to two Olympic gold medals in the 1984 Los Angeles Olympic Games. Baumann later remarked that Tihanyi served as a second father to him, after his natural father died in 1983. He was fondly remembered by his wife Cathy, who said: "both [Baumann and he] had the same qualities: the drive, outlook, discipline and the strength to overcome whatever difficulty they faced in life... These qualities allowed them to reach the pinnacle of the sport and bring home two gold medals in 1984."

Tihanyi earned a diploma in physical education from his homeland of Hungary. After immigrating to Canada, he earned both a bachelor's degree and master's degree in physical education at the University of British Columbia. In 1972, he earned a Ph.D. at the University of Alberta. His doctoral thesis was entitled "Relationship of selected maturational determinants to competitive swimming."

In 1974, Tihanyi became a professor at Laurentian University, located in Sudbury, Ontario, and was a professor in child growth and development in the School of Human Movement. He founded both the Laurentian University Aqua Vees Varsity Swim Team and the age-group Laurentian University Swim Club (now known as Sudbury Laurentian Swim Club) as head coach. He was the director of the division of physical education from 1993 to 1996 (now known as the School of Human Kinetics).

Although Tihanyi coached several national and international level athletes, his coaching philosophy actually focused on personal self-improvement first. Once that stage was achieved in an athlete, the coach moved to focus and self-discipline: "He was so detailed," said Baumann. "All the workouts were meticulously planned." Baumann recalled that Tinhanyi was fond of the dictum: "'if you fail to plan, you plan to fail'. I still [in 2007] see coaches who plan their workouts on the way to the pool."

After his death in 2007, Laurentian University officially renamed its swimming facilities the Jeno Tihanyi Olympic Gold Pool in his memory.
