= Alex Baumann =

Canadian swimmer (born 1964)

Alex Baumann OC OOnt
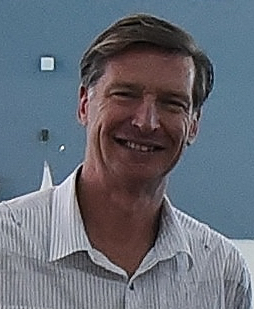
- Baumann in 2017

Personal information
- Full name: Alexander Baumann
- Nicknames: "Alex", "Sasha"
- National team: Canada
- Born: April 21, 1964 (age 62) Prague, Czechoslovakia
- Height: 1.89 m (6 ft 2 in)
- Weight: 80 kg (176 lb)

Sport
- Sport: Swimming
- Strokes: Individual medley, backstroke
- Club: Sudbury Laurentian Swim Club
- College team: Indiana University
Medal record
Men's swimming
Representing Canada
Olympic Games
Gold medal – first place	1984 Los Angeles	200 m medley
Gold medal – first place	1984 Los Angeles	400 m medley
World Championships (LC)
Silver medal – second place	1986 Madrid	200 m medley
Bronze medal – third place	1986 Madrid	400 m medley
Pan Pacific Championships
Silver medal – second place	1987 Brisbane	200 m medley
Bronze medal – third place	1987 Brisbane	400 m medley
Commonwealth Games
Gold medal – first place	1982 Brisbane	200 m medley
Gold medal – first place	1982 Brisbane	400 m medley
Gold medal – first place	1986 Edinburgh	200 m medley
Gold medal – first place	1986 Edinburgh	400 m medley
Gold medal – first place	1986 Edinburgh	4×100 m medley
Silver medal – second place	1986 Edinburgh	4×100 m freestyle
Bronze medal – third place	1982 Brisbane	4×100 m freestyle
Pan American Games
Bronze medal – third place	1979 San Juan	400 m medley
Summer Universiade
Gold medal – first place	1983 Edmonton	200 m medley
Gold medal – first place	1983 Edmonton	400 m medley
Bronze medal – third place	1983 Edmonton	200 m freestyle

Alexander Baumann, OC OOnt (born April 21, 1964) is a Canadian sports administrator and former competitive swimmer who won two gold medals and set two world records at the 1984 Summer Olympics in Los Angeles. In 2007, he was regarded by the CBC, the national broadcaster, as "the greatest swimmer in Canadian history", as the twin Olympic gold medals were Canada's first in swimming since 1912.

Since he retired from competitive swimming, he has worked as an administrator in Canada, Australia, and New Zealand.

In May 2021, Baumann was appointed Chief Executive of Swimming Australia. At the end of the 2020 Tokyo Olympics held in 2021, Baumann subsequently resigned the position of CEO in August 2021, citing health reasons.

== Early years ==
Born in Prague (former Czechoslovakia), Baumann was raised in Canada after his family moved there in 1969 following the Prague Spring. The family settled in Sudbury, Ontario, where, at the age of nine, Baumann became involved in competitive swimming, training at Laurentian University.

== Olympic career ==
By the time he was seventeen, Baumann owned 38 Canadian swimming records and the world record in the 200-metre individual medley. He accepted a swimming scholarship and entered Indiana University to train under its legendary coach James "Doc" Counsilman; however with chronic pain in his shoulder, he made the decision to return to Sudbury to continue physical therapy and training under the direction of his long-time coach, Dr. Jeno Tihanyi. Forced to sit out the 1982 World Aquatic Championships in Ecuador due to his injury, Baumann's training progressed enough that he was able to win gold in both 200 and 400-metre individual medley events at the 1982 Commonwealth Games in Brisbane, Australia, lowering his world record in the 200-metre event to 2:02.25 in the process. It was here that he met his future wife Australian swimmer Tracey Taggart. He also won the 400-metre individual medley event at the 1983 World University Games.

Prior to the 1984 Summer Olympics in Los Angeles, Baumann's father died of complications from diabetes and his brother, Roman, died by suicide. Baumann persevered through these tragedies, as well as his lingering tendinitis and shoulder injuries, to enter the Olympics as one of Canada's best Olympic hopes.

At the 1984 Olympics, Baumann was selected as Canada's flagbearer for the opening ceremonies. He won gold medals in the 400-metre individual medley, setting a world record time of 4:17.41, and the 200-metre race, lowering the world mark to 2:01.42. The 400-metre gold was Canada's first in swimming since 1912.

Baumann continued his swimming career with three gold medals at the 1986 Commonwealth Games in Edinburgh in the two individual medley events, and swimming anchor on Canada's 4 × 100 m medley relay team. However, later that year, he won a silver and a bronze at the 1986 World Aquatics Championships in Madrid, Spain losing to a 19-year-old Hungarian swimmer, Tamás Darnyi.

Baumann shared a close bond with his coach of 14 years, Dr. Jeno Tihanyi. After the 1984 Olympics, the two authored a book titled Swimming with Alex Baumann: A Program for Competitive and Recreational Swimmers.

== Sports administration ==
Subsequent to the 1987 Pacific Championships in Australia, Baumann retired from competitive swimming, initially working with Canadian broadcaster CBC for the 1988 Olympics, and also returning to Sudbury as a coach until 1991. Some speculated that Baumann was unable to find a coaching position due to his outspokenness. He criticized the Canadian Olympic Committee for dismissing Don Talbot and replacing him with Dave Johnson, as it was widely alleged that Talbot was fired for refusing to put the daughter of a Committee member on the national team. Baumann also criticized Swimming Canada for its subpar performances at the Commonwealth Games in Auckland in 1990.

=== 1996-2006: In Queensland Australia ===
Baumann moved to Australia to enter graduate studies at the University of Queensland before becoming manager of sport programs with the Queensland Academy of Sport between 1996 and 1997. He then held various positions with the Queensland Government before becoming CEO of Queensland Swimming in 1999.

After a poor showing by Canada at the 2000 Olympics in Sydney, Baumann felt he had more to offer Canadian sport, and expressed interest in taking on the vacant leadership position at the Canadian Olympic Committee; however, the COC felt he did not have the business background to handle the job. Ultimately, Baumann was not offered the Canadian Olympic Committee position. This caused some controversy and criticism in Canada as many Canadian athletes and citizens felt he was the best choice for the job. A number of foreign sports organizations felt the same way, and he was courted heavily by the English Institute of Sport and the Queensland Academy of Sport, ultimately accepting the position of executive director for the Queensland Academy of Sport in 2002.

In 2004, after a dismal showing by Canada at the 2004 Summer Olympics in Athens, in which they failed to medal and their best finish was sixth place, head coach Dave Johnson was fired. The COC offered Baumann the CEO or head coaching position of Swimming Canada (Karen Spierkel had resigned as CEO on 3 May 2003 after the controversy surrounding Jennifer Carroll waving a Quebec flag on the podium during the 2002 Commonwealth Games) but he turned both down, saying that he would remain with the Queensland Academy. Several commentators panned Baumann as hypocritical as he was publicly critical of the Canadian swim program for several years from 2000 to 2004, right up to the Athens Olympics. In response, Baumann toned down his criticism.

=== 2006-2012: Head of Canada's Summer Olympic Program ===
On 27 September 2006, the Canadian Olympic Committee announced that Baumann was hired to take over Canada's Road to Excellence initiative beginning in January 2007. Canada had achieved mediocre results at the 2004 Athens Olympics with a tally of only 12 medals in all events, which resulted in an overall 21st place national showing. These poor results prompted much criticism from Canadians. At that time, Baumann announced a goal for Team Canada: a top 16 finish in the 2008 Beijing Olympics and a top 12 finish at the 2012 London Games.

In the Beijing event, for the first time Canadian athletes were paid for medals earned. Gold medalists earned $20,000; silver medalists were paid $15,000; and bronze medalists $10,000. A total of $515,000 from the Athlete Excellence Fund was given to the medal winning athletes. At the Beijing Olympiad, Canada wound up finishing 19th in gold medals and 14th in total medals, and Baumann's methods were vindicated.

In the 2012 London Olympic Games with the initiation of its "Own the Podium" programme, Canada finished 13th in total medals, thus improving on its performance in Beijing while falling somewhat short of its self-declared goal of 12th position. It finished the event with 18 medals: one gold, five silver and 12 bronze.

=== 2012-2017: Head of High Performance Sport New Zealand ===
On 15 January 2012, High Performance Sport New Zealand announced the appointment of Baumann to the role of Chief Executive, effective 31 January 2012.

Baumann resigned in June 2017 due to the desire to move back to Australia to be closer to his children and extended family. Whilst he was in this position at the 2016 Rio Olympics, New Zealand won 18 medals in nine different sports, of which four were gold.

=== Swimming Australia ===
In April 2021 Alex Baumann was appointed as the Chief Executive of Swimming Australia. In December 2017, Swimming Australia announced that it had appointed Baumann to the new role as Swimming Australia's Chief Strategist, High Performance.

On 9 August 2021 Baumann announced his resignation as the CEO of Swimming Australia after only 3 months of tenure, citing health concerns and wanting to spend more time with his family.

== Awards and honours ==
Baumann was named Canada's male athlete of the year for 1984 and was made an Officer of the Order of Canada. He was also named the Male World Swimmer of the Year by Swimming World magazine in the same year. In 1988, he was awarded the Order of Ontario.

Baumann was inducted into the Ontario Sports Hall of Fame in 1999.

Baumann was named Honorary Colonel of 412 VIP Transport Squadron of the Royal Canadian Air Force based in Ottawa in June 2011.

In 2012, Baumann received the Queen Elizabeth II Diamond Jubilee Medal.

== Personal life ==
Baumann is married to Tracey Taggart, an Australian swimmer he met during the Brisbane 1982 Commonwealth Games. They married on 30 April 1988, and have two children: Tabitha and Ashton Baumann.

In March 2009, Baumann swam at the Ontario Masters Swim Championships. It was his first swim meet in 22 years. He continued where he left off, beating the world record in the 200 metre individual medley in the 45–49 age group category by more than 3.3 seconds with a time of 2:12.01.

His son, Ashton Baumann, is also a swimmer.

== See also ==
- List of members of the International Swimming Hall of Fame
- List of Commonwealth Games medallists in swimming (men)
- List of Olympic medalists in swimming (men)
- World record progression 200 metres medley
- World record progression 400 metres medley

Records
Preceded by Bill Barrett	Men's 200-metre individual medley world record-holder (long course); 1 August 1980 – 23 August 1987	Succeeded by Tamás Darnyi
Preceded by Jens-Peter Berndt	Men's 400-metre individual medley world record-holder (long course); 17 June 1984 – 14 August 1987	Succeeded by David Wharton
Awards
Preceded by Rowdy Gaines	World Swimmer of the Year; 1981	Succeeded by Vladimir Salnikov
Preceded by Rick Carey	World Swimmer of the Year; 1984	Succeeded by Michael Gross
