= Ilya Borodin =

Ilya Borodin may refer to:

- Ilya Borodin (footballer) (born 1976), Russian footballer
- Ilya Borodin (swimmer) (born 2003), Russian swimmer
