= António Basto =

Portuguese swimmer (born 1945)

Personal information
- Nationality: Portuguese
- Born: 9 November 1945 (age 80) Algés, Portugal

Sport
- Sport: Swimming

António Basto (born 9 November 1945) is a Portuguese former medley swimmer. He competed in the men's 400 metre individual medley at the 1964 Summer Olympics.
