= Rui Borges (swimmer) =

Portuguese swimmer

Personal information
- Full name: Rui Paulo Leitão Borges
- Born: 4 June 1967 (age 59)

Sport
- Sport: Swimming

Rui Borges (born 4 June 1967) is a Portuguese swimmer. He competed in the men's 400 metre individual medley at the 1988 Summer Olympics.
