= György Kosztolánczy (swimmer) =

Hungarian swimmer

Personal information
- Nationality: Hungarian
- Born: 17 February 1946 (age 80) Budapest, Hungary

Sport
- Sport: Swimming

György Kosztolánczy (born 17 February 1946) is a Hungarian former swimmer. He competed in two events at the 1964 Summer Olympics.
