= Peter Bermel =

German swimmer (born 1967)

Personal information
- Born: 25 June 1967 (age 59) Hamburg, West Germany
- Height: 1.90 m (6 ft 3 in)
- Weight: 85 kg (187 lb)

Sport
- Sport: Swimming
- Club: Sportgemeinschaft Hamburg
Medal record
Men's swimming
Representing West Germany
European Championships
Bronze medal – third place	1985 Sofia	200 m medley

Peter Bermel (born 25 June 1967) is a retired German swimmer who won a bronze medal at the 1985 European Aquatics Championships. He also competed at the 1988 Summer Olympics and finished fifth and eights in the 200 m and 400 m medley events, respectively.

Bermel started swimming in a club at age 4-5 and by 13 was a member of the national junior team. In 1983 he won the European Youth Championships in medley and backstroke events. In 1991, after qualifying for the World Cup in Australia he retired from competitive swimming. By 2000, he returned to the pool to compete in the masters category. This was a difficult task as he started smoking and gained weight up to 112 kg, but he quickly shed 20 kg by training.

He is a married to Monika and has a son, and a daughter. They live in Elmshorn.
