= Patrick Kühl =

German swimmer

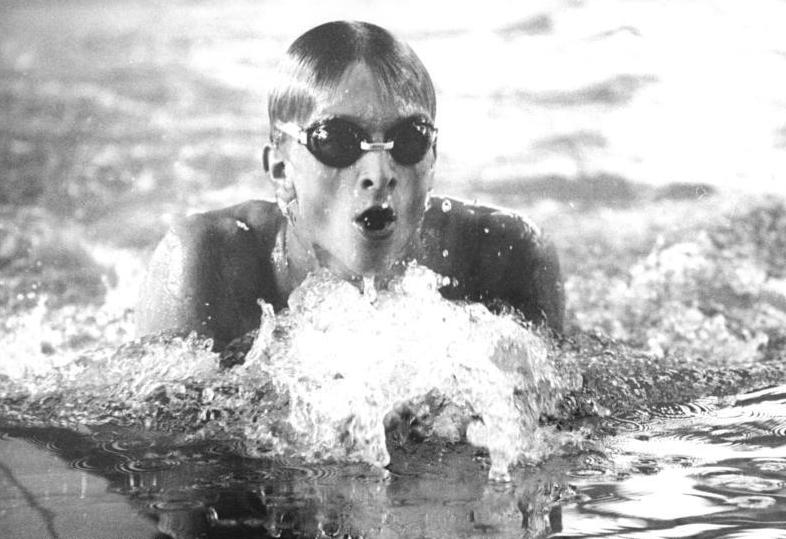
- Patrick Kühl in 1987

Personal information
- Nationality: East Germany (until 1990); Germany
- Born: 26 March 1968 (age 58) Güstrow, Bezirk Rostock, East Germany
- Height: 1.90 m (6 ft 3 in)
- Weight: 82 kg (181 lb)

Sport
- Sport: Swimming
- Strokes: Medley
- Club: Armeesportsklub Vorwärts Potsdam; SC Magdeburg
Medal record
Men's swimming
Representing East Germany
Olympic Games
Silver medal – second place	1988 Seoul	200 m medley
Representing East Germany
European Championships (LC)
Bronze medal – third place	1987 Strasbourg	400 m medley
Representing East Germany
Silver medal – second place	1989 Bonn	400 m medley
Representing Germany
Silver medal – second place	1991 Athens	400 m medley

Patrick Kühl (born 26 March 1968 in Güstrow, Mecklenburg-Vorpommern) is a former medley swimmer from East Germany, who won the silver medal in the 200 m individual medley for the GDR at the 1988 Summer Olympics in Seoul, South Korea.

== See also ==
- List of German records in swimming
