= Swimming at the 1960 Summer Olympics =

Swimming at the Games of the XVII Olympiad
- Venue: Stadio Olimpico del Nuoto
- Dates: 26 August – 3 September 1960
- No. of events: 15
- Competitors: 380 from 45 nations

At the 1960 Summer Olympics in Rome, 15 swimming events were contested, eight for men and seven for women. There was a total of 380 participants from 45 countries competing. For the first time, the 4 × 100 metres medley relay was contested. The United States topped the medal standings with a total of 15 medals (9 gold), while Australia finished a close second with 13 medals (5 gold). 16-year-old phenomenon Chris von Saltza won four medals, three of them gold.

== Medal table ==
Rank	Nation	Gold	Silver	Bronze	Total
1	United States	9	3	3	15
2	Australia	5	5	3	13
3	Great Britain	1	1	1	3
4	Japan	0	3	2	5
5	United Team of Germany	0	1	3	4
6	Netherlands	0	1	2	3
7	Sweden	0	1	0	1
8	Brazil	0	0	1	1
Totals (8 entries)		15	15	15	45

== Medal summary ==
=== Men's events ===
Games	Gold		Silver		Bronze	
100 m freestyle	John Devitt; Australia	55.2 (OR)	Lance Larson; United States	55.2 (OR)	Manuel dos Santos; Brazil	55.4
400 m freestyle	Murray Rose; Australia	4:18.3 (OR)	Tsuyoshi Yamanaka; Japan	4:21.4	John Konrads; Australia	4:21.8
1500 m freestyle	John Konrads; Australia	17:19.2 (OR)	Murray Rose; Australia	17:21.7	George Breen; United States	17:30.6
100 m backstroke	David Theile; Australia	1:01.9 (OR)	Frank McKinney; United States	1:02.1	Bob Bennett; United States	1:02.3
200 m breaststroke	Bill Mulliken; United States	2:37.4	Yoshihiko Osaki; Japan	2:38.0	Wieger Mensonides; Netherlands	2:39.7
200 m butterfly	Mike Troy; United States	2:12.8 (WR)	Neville Hayes; Australia	2:14.6	Dave Gillanders; United States	2:15.3
4 × 200 m freestyle relay	United States; George Harrison; Dick Blick; Mike Troy; Jeff Farrell	8:10.2 (WR)	Japan; Makoto Fukui; Hiroshi Ishii; Tsuyoshi Yamanaka; Tatsuo Fujimoto	8:13.3	Australia; David Dickson; John Devitt; Murray Rose; John Konrads	8:13.8
4 × 100 m medley relay	United States; Frank McKinney; Paul Hait; Lance Larson; Jeff Farrell	4:05.4 (WR)	Australia; David Theile; Terry Gathercole; Neville Hayes; Geoff Shipton	4:12.0	Japan; Kazuo Tomita; Koichi Hirakida; Yoshihiko Osaki; Keigo Shimuzu	4:12.2

=== Women's events ===
Games	Gold		Silver		Bronze	
100 m freestyle	Dawn Fraser; Australia	1:01.2 (OR)	Chris von Saltza; United States	1:02.8	Natalie Steward; Great Britain	1:03.1
400 m freestyle	Chris von Saltza; United States	4:50.6 (OR)	Jane Cederqvist; Sweden	4:53.9	Tineke Lagerberg; Netherlands	4:56.9
100 m backstroke	Lynn Burke; United States	1:09.3 (OR)	Natalie Steward; Great Britain	1:10.8	Satoko Tanaka; Japan	1:11.4
200 m breaststroke	Anita Lonsbrough; Great Britain	2:49.5 (WR)	Wiltrud Urselmann; United Team of Germany	2:50.0	Barbara Göbel; United Team of Germany	2:53.6
100 m butterfly	Carolyn Schuler; United States	1:09.5 (OR)	Marianne Heemskerk; Netherlands	1:10.4	Jan Andrew; Australia	1:12.2
4 × 100 m freestyle relay	United States; Joan Spillane; Shirley Stobs; Carolyn Wood; Chris von Saltza	4:08.9 (WR)	Australia; Dawn Fraser; Ilsa Konrads; Lorraine Crapp; Alva Colquhoun	4:11.3	United Team of Germany; Christel Steffin; Heidi Pechstein; Gisela Weiss; Ursel Brunner	4:19.7
4 × 100 m medley relay	United States; Lynn Burke; Patty Kempner; Carolyn Schuler; Chris von Saltza	4:41.1 (WR)	Australia; Marilyn Wilson; Rosemary Lassig; Jan Andrew; Dawn Fraser	4:45.9	United Team of Germany; Ingrid Schmidt; Ursula Küper; Bärbel Fuhrmann; Ursel Brunner	4:47.6

== 100m men's freestyle controversy ==
Results were decided by finish judges who relied on their eyes and did not use replays. Three judges were assigned to each finishing position. There were three official timers in 1960 for each lane and swimmer, all timing by hand. All three timers for Devitt, in lane three, timed him in 55.2 seconds. The three timers for lane four timed Lance Larson in 55.0, 55.1, and 55.1 seconds.

Former Olympic swimmer and FINA co-founder Max Ritter inspected the judge's scorecards. Two of the three first-place judges found that Devitt had finished first and the third found for Larson. Of the three-second-place judges, two found that Devitt finished second and one found that Larson was second. Ritter pointed out to chief judge Henry Runströmer of Sweden that the scorecards indicated a tie. Runstrümer cast the deciding vote and declared Devitt the winner. However, the rules at that time did not provide for the chief judge to have a vote or give him the right to break ties. Ties were supposed to be broken by referring to the timing machine. The official results placed Devitt first and Larson second, both with the identical time of 55.2 seconds. The United States team appealed, bolstered by videotaped footage of the finish that appeared to show Larson the winner. The appeal jury, headed by Jan de Vries, also the President of FINA in 1960, rejected the appeal, keeping Devitt the winner. This controversy would pave the way for electronic touchpads to be included in swimming events to determine finish and accurate timing.

== Participating nations ==
380 swimmers from 45 nations competed.

- Argentina (3)
- Australia (26)
- Austria (10)
- Belgium (3)
- Brazil (5)
- Burma (1)
- Canada (8)
- Ceylon (1)
- Cuba (1)
- Czechoslovakia (3)
- Denmark (4)
- Finland (5)
- Formosa (1)
- France (19)
- United Team of Germany (26)
- Great Britain (23)
- Greece (2)
- Hong Kong (1)
- Hungary (18)
- Iceland (2)
- Indonesia (2)
- Israel (4)
- Italy (23)
- Japan (21)
- Luxembourg (4)
- Malaya (2)
- Malta (2)
- Mexico (11)
- Netherlands (19)
- Philippines (8)
- Poland (5)
- Portugal (5)
- Puerto Rico (1)
- Rhodesia (4)
- Romania (2)
- South Africa (3)
- Soviet Union (23)
- Spain (10)
- Sweden (15)
- Switzerland (9)
- Turkey (2)
- United States (31)
- Venezuela (1)
- Vietnam (2)
- Yugoslavia (9)
