= List of Australian Olympic medallists in swimming =

Australia has competed in swimming at the Summer Olympics since the 1900 Summer Olympics in Paris, after only sending a runner, Edwin Flack, to the 1896 Summer Olympics. Frederick Lane was Australia's sole swimming representative at the 1900 Games, winning two individual gold medals. Women's events were added at the 1912 Summer Olympics in Stockholm; Fanny Durack and Mina Wylie, Australia's first female representatives, won gold and silver in the 100-metre freestyle, which was the first women's event on the program. At the 1908 Summer Olympics and the 1912 Summer Olympics, Australia competed as Australasia, sending a combined team with New Zealand. The table includes Malcolm Champion, a New Zealander who was part of the 4×200-metre freestyle relay team that captured gold in 1912.

Australia has won a total of 78 gold medals in the sport, second only to the United States, who have won 257. East Germany is in third place with 38 golds, although this is widely attributed to state-sponsored systematic doping programs.

Swimming is Australia's most prolific Olympic sport, having been responsible for 78 of Australia's 185 Olympic gold medals. In addition, a list of the top 100 Australian Olympians of all time, compiled by the Australian Olympic Committee, named 35 swimmers in the top 100, more than any other sport. Swimmers have been given the honour of carrying the Australian flag six times in twelve at the closing ceremony, which is traditionally reserved for the most successful athlete of the delegation.

Australia's strongest-ever performance in swimming was at the 1956 Olympics on home soil in Melbourne. Australia claimed eight of the thirteen gold medals available, including both relays and a clean sweep of the medals in the 100-metre freestyle, considered the blue-riband event for both men and women. This is the only time that Australia has topped the medal tally in swimming, and the tally of gold medals was not surpassed until Australia won 9 at the Tokyo 2020 Summer Olympics, when the swimming program had expanded to its current 35 events.

Australia has been most successful in the freestyle discipline, with 51 of the 78 golds coming in the stroke. Eight of the gold have come from the men's 1500-metre freestyle, the most victories in the event by any country, which has resulted in the event being dubbed "Australia's race" by Australian commentators. Australia's first medal outside of freestyle did not come until 1932 when Clare Dennis and Bonnie Mealing won gold and silver in the 200-metre breaststroke and 100-metre backstroke respectively. It was not until John Davies' victory in the 200-metre breaststroke in 1952 that a male swimmer had won a medal outside of freestyle. Backstroke is Australia's weakest discipline, with David Theile's two consecutive golds in the 100-metre backstroke being the only victories in the discipline until Kaylee McKeown's double golds in Tokyo 2020 Summer Olympics.

== Individual medallists ==
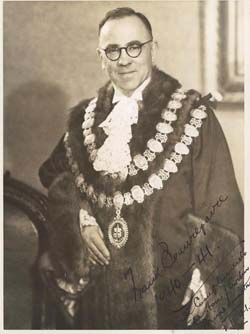
Frank Beaurepaire won a record 34 Australian titles, which stood for more than 70 years until surpassed by Susie O'Neill in 2000. He later became Lord Mayor of Melbourne, and helped to secure the 1956 Melbourne Olympics, Australia's most successful in swimming.

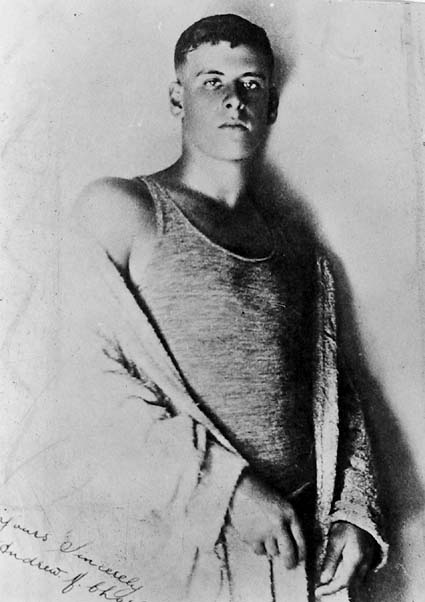
Boy Charlton was the first Australian to win the 1500 m freestyle, an event which Australia has won eight times, the most by any country. The race is sometimes referred to as "Australia's race".

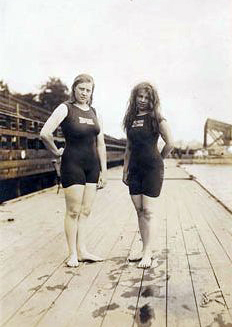
Fanny Durack (left) and Mina Wylie were the first two women to represent Australia in swimming at the Olympics. They were club-mates in Sydney and completed an Australian quinella in the 100 m freestyle.

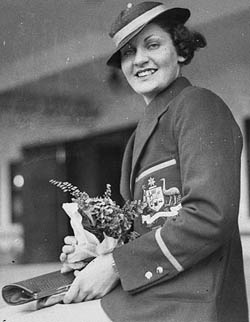
Clare Dennis was the first Australian to win gold in a non-freestyle event, the 200 m breaststroke, at the 1932 Summer Olympics.

The following table includes only medals won by Australian swimmers in individual events.

- Shane Gould won three gold, one silver, and one bronze, all in individual events at her only Olympics, aged 15. In doing so, she became the first woman to win three individual gold medals at one Olympics all in world record time. She is the only Australian to win five individual medals and three individual gold medals at one Olympics.
- Kaylee McKeown has the most gold medals, with 4 total.
- Ariarne Titmus has the most total medals, with 6.
- Dawn Fraser won three consecutive gold medals in 1956, 1960, and 1964 in the 100-metre freestyle, becoming the first swimmer to win any event three times.
- the following swimmers have won consecutive gold medals in a single event: Murray Rose (men's 400 m freestyle), Ian Thorpe (men's 400 m freestyle), Kieren Perkins (men's 1500 m freestyle), Grant Hackett (men's 1500 m freestyle), David Theile (men's 100 m backstroke), Ariarne Titmus (women's 400 m freestyle) and Kaylee McKeown (women's 100 & 200 m backstroke).

Note: Years in bold indicate when a swimmer won a medal.

Athlete	Gold	Silver	Bronze	Total	Years competed
Kaylee McKeown	4	0	1	5	**2020**, **2024**
Ariarne Titmus	3	3	0	6	**2020**, **2024**
Shane Gould	3	1	1	5	**1972**
Ian Thorpe	3	1	1	5	**2000**, **2004**
Dawn Fraser	3	1	0	4	**1956**, **1960**, **1964**
Murray Rose	3	1	0	4	**1956**, **1960**
Grant Hackett	2	2	0	4	**2000**, **2004**, **2008**
Kieren Perkins	2	2	0	4	**1992**, **1996**, **2000**
Susie O'Neill	2	1	1	4	**1992**, **1996**, **2000**
Emma McKeon	2	0	2	4	**2016**, **2020**, 2024
Frederick Lane	2	0	0	2	**1900**
Stephanie Rice	2	0	0	2	**2008**, 2012
David Theile	2	0	0	2	**1956**, **1960**
Michael Wenden	2	0	0	2	**1968**, 1972
Leisel Jones	1	3	1	5	**2000**, **2004**, **2008**, 2012
Petria Thomas	1	2	1	4	**1996**, **2000**, **2004**
Boy Charlton	1	2	0	3	**1924**, **1928**, 1932
Kyle Chalmers	1	2	0	3	**2016**, **2020**, **2024**
Libby Trickett	1	1	1	3	**2004**, **2008**, 2012
Duncan Armstrong	1	1	0	2	**1988**, 1992
Lorraine Crapp	1	1	0	2	**1956**, 1960
John Devitt	1	1	0	2	**1956**, **1960**
Zac Stubblety-Cook	1	1	0	2	**2020**, **2024**
Michelle Ford	1	0	1	2	1976, **1980**
John Konrads	1	0	1	2	1956, **1960**, 1964
Beverley Whitfield	1	0	1	2	**1972**
Kevin Berry	1	0	0	1	1960, **1964**
Brad Cooper	1	0	0	1	**1972**
John Davies	1	0	0	1	1948, **1952**
Clare Dennis	1	0	0	1	**1932**
Fanny Durack	1	0	0	1	**1912**
Jon Henricks	1	0	0	1	**1956**, 1960
Jodie Henry	1	0	0	1	**2004**
Mack Horton	1	0	0	1	**2016**, 2020
Lyn McClements	1	0	0	1	**1968**
Cameron McEvoy	1	0	0	1	2012, 2016, 2020, **2024**
Gail Neall	1	0	0	1	**1972**
Ian O'Brien	1	0	0	1	**1964**, 1968
Mollie O'Callaghan	1	0	0	1	2020, **2024**
Jon Sieben	1	0	0	1	**1984**, 1988, 1992
Bob Windle	1	0	0	1	**1964**, 1968
Frank Beaurepaire	0	1	3	4	**1908**, **1920**, **1924**
Daniel Kowalski	0	1	2	3	**1996**, 2000
Emily Seebohm	0	1	1	2	2008, **2012**, 2016, **2020**
Alicia Coutts	0	1	1	2	2008, **2012**, 2016
Hayley Lewis	0	1	1	2	**1992**, 1996, 2000
John Marshall	0	1	1	2	**1948**, 1952, 1956
Matt Welsh	0	1	1	2	**2000**, 2004
Glenn Beringen	0	1	0	1	**1984**
Madeline Groves	0	1	0	1	**2016**
Brooke Hanson	0	1	0	1	**2004**
Meg Harris	0	1	0	1	2020, **2024**
Neville Hayes	0	1	0	1	**1960**
Cecil Healy	0	1	0	1	**1912**
Glen Housman	0	1	0	1	**1992**, 1996
Moesha Johnson	0	1	0	1	**2024**
Michael Klim	0	1	0	1	1996, **2000**, 2004
Suzie Landells	0	1	0	1	**1984**
Mitch Larkin	0	1	0	1	2012, **2016**
Nancy Lyons	0	1	0	1	**1948**, 1952
James Magnussen	0	1	0	1	**2012**, 2016
Jack McLoughlin	0	1	0	1	2016, **2020**
Bonnie Mealing	0	1	0	1	1928, **1932**
Scott Miller	0	1	0	1	**1996**
John Monckton	0	1	0	1	**1956**, 1960
Karen Phillips	0	1	0	1	**1984**
Brenton Rickard	0	1	0	1	**2008**, 2012
Christian Sprenger	0	1	0	1	2008, **2012**
Mark Stockwell	0	1	0	1	**1984**
Eamon Sullivan	0	1	0	1	2004, **2008**, 2012
Graham Windeatt	0	1	0	1	**1972**, 1976
Elijah Winnington	0	1	0	1	2020, **2024**
Mina Wylie	0	1	0	1	**1912**
Peter Evans	0	0	2	2	**1980**, 1984
Harold Hardwick	0	0	2	2	**1912**
Samantha Riley	0	0	2	2	**1992**, **1996**
Jessicah Schipper	0	0	2	2	2004, **2008**, 2012
Allan Wood	0	0	2	2	1960, **1964**
Cate Campbell	0	0	2	2	**2008**, 2012, 2016, **2020**
Jan Andrew	0	0	1	1	**1960**
Bronte Barratt	0	0	1	1	2008, **2012**, 2016
Graeme Brewer	0	0	1	1	**1980**, 1984
Greg Brough	0	0	1	1	**1968**
Glenn Buchanan	0	0	1	1	**1984**
Gary Chapman	0	0	1	1	**1956**
Judy-Joy Davies	0	0	1	1	**1948**, 1952
Scott Goodman	0	0	1	1	**1996**
Stephen Holland	0	0	1	1	**1976**
Geoff Huegill	0	0	1	1	**2000**, 2004
Mark Kerry	0	0	1	1	1976, **1980**, 1984
Andrew Lauterstein	0	0	1	1	**2008**
Kareena Lee	0	0	1	1	**2020**
Faith Leech	0	0	1	1	**1956**
Justin Lemberg	0	0	1	1	**1984**
Julie McDonald	0	0	1	1	**1988**, 1992
Max Metzker	0	0	1	1	1976, **1980**
Karen Moras	0	0	1	1	**1968**, 1972
Justin Norris	0	0	1	1	**2000**, 2004
Michele Pearson	0	0	1	1	1980, **1984**
Phil Rogers	0	0	1	1	**1992**, 1996, 2000
Brendon Smith	0	0	1	1	**2020**, 2024
Nicole Stevenson	0	0	1	1	1988, **1992**, 1996
Hayden Stoeckel	0	0	1	1	**2008**, 2012
Rob Woodhouse	0	0	1	1	**1984**, 1988

== All medallists ==
The following table includes all those who have won medals, including as part of relay teams. Since 1984, swimmers who participated in the preliminary heats but not in the final were awarded medals if the final team went on to claim a medal, whereas those prior to 1984 did not. Those who swam in the heats only are marked with an asterisk, multiple times if multiple medals were awarded for swimming in heats only. Malcolm Champion, a member of the 4×200-metre freestyle relay team in 1912, was a New Zealander, competing as part of the combined Australasia team. His teammates in the combined relay team were Cecil Healy, Les Boardman, and Harold Hardwick.

- Emma McKeon is the most decorated Australian Olympian of all time, with six gold medals.
- Emma McKeon's seven medals, four gold and three bronze, at the 2020 Summer Olympics are the largest total in a single Olympics by an Australian. McKeon's career total of fourteen medals is the most by any Australian Olympian.
- Dawn Fraser and Murray Rose jointly held the previous records for gold medals, and Fraser the record of eight medals in total, prior to Thorpe.
- Sandra Morgan, a member of the Australian women's 4×100-metre freestyle relay team in 1956, is the youngest Australian gold medallist of all time, aged 14 years and 6 months.

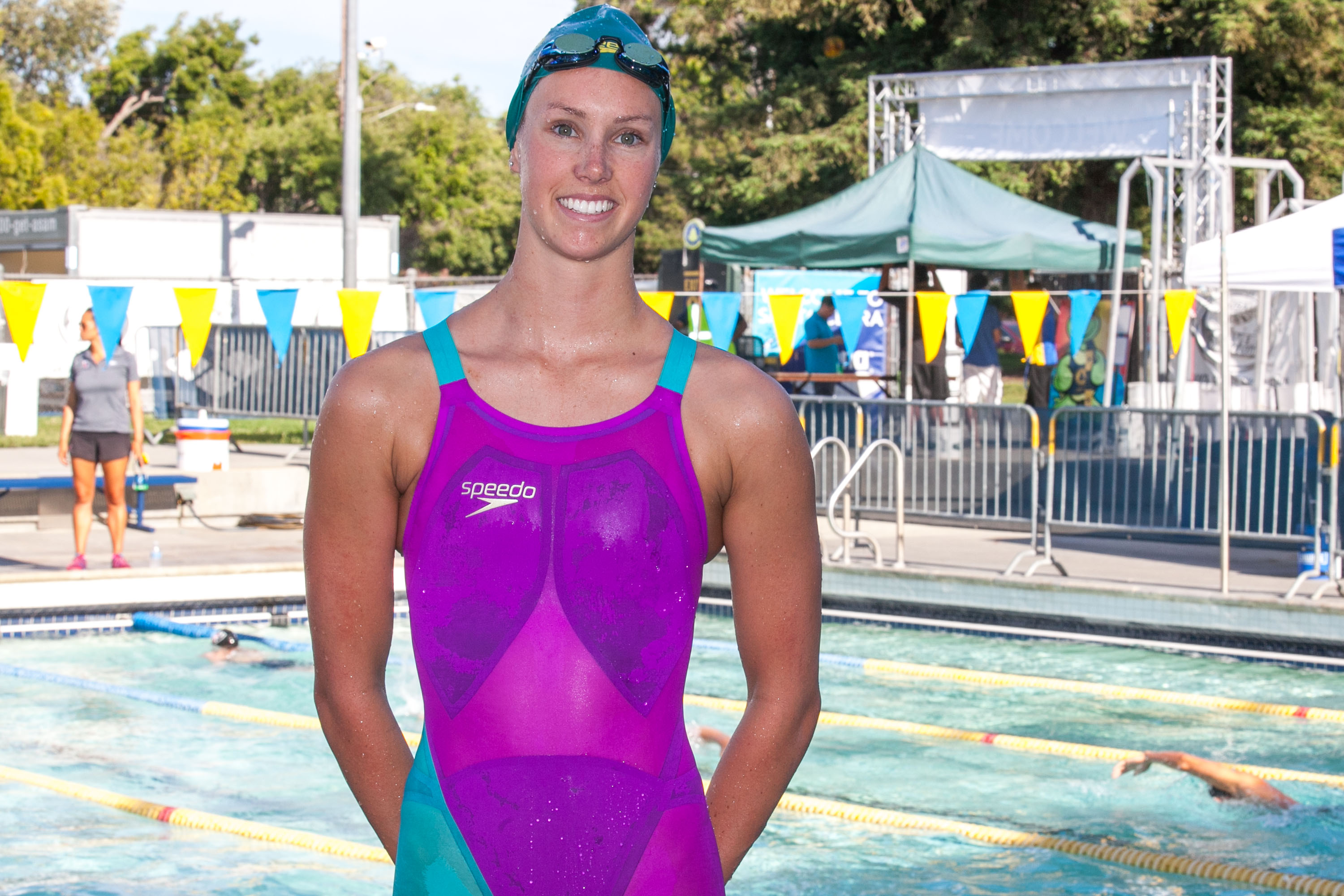
Emma McKeon, Australia's most prolific Olympic medallist with 14 Olympic medals including 6 gold.

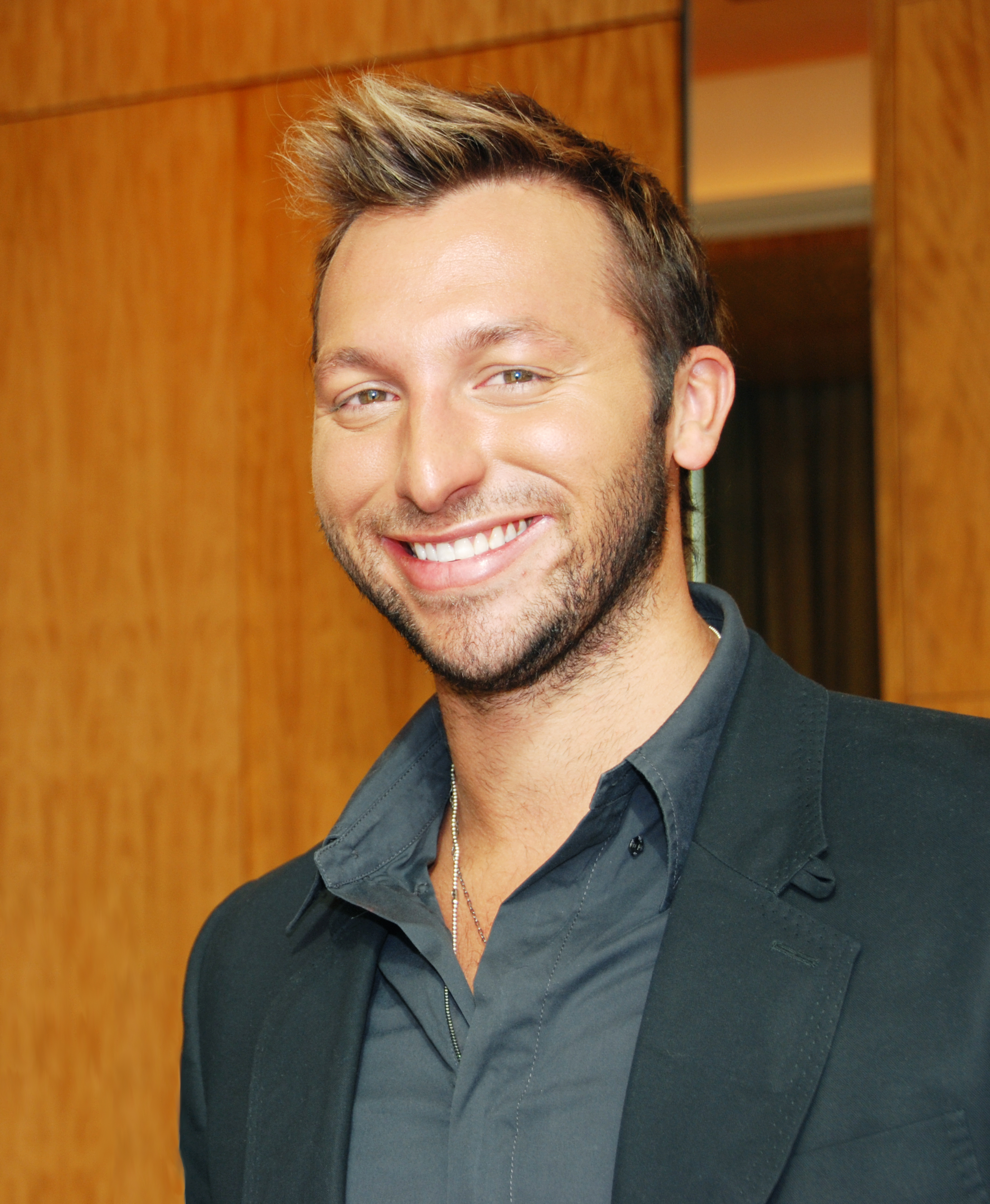
Ian Thorpe, with 9 medals is equal with Leisel Jones for second-most Olympic medals by an Australian.

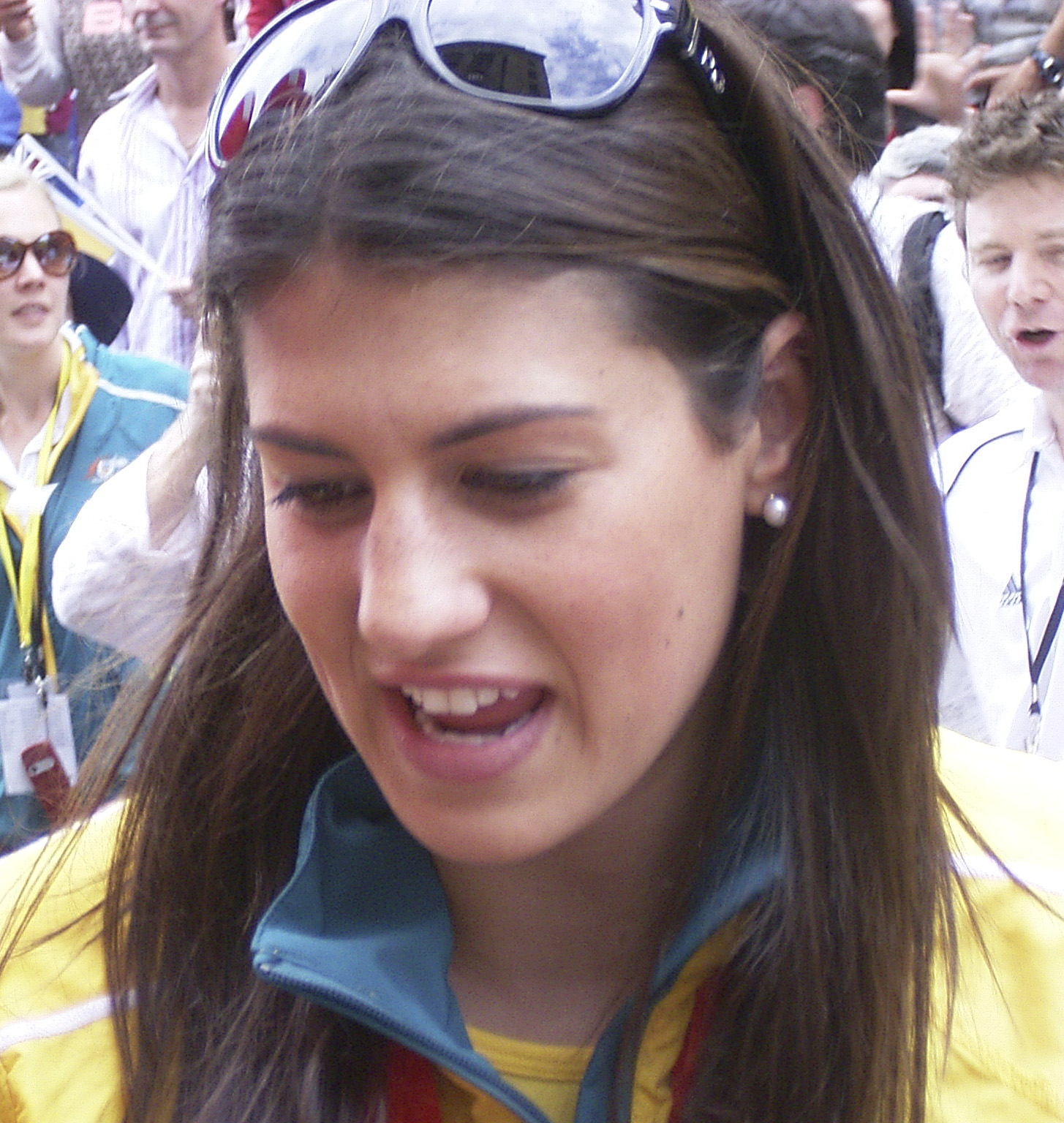
Stephanie Rice, winner of three gold medals at the 2008 Olympics, including the medley double.

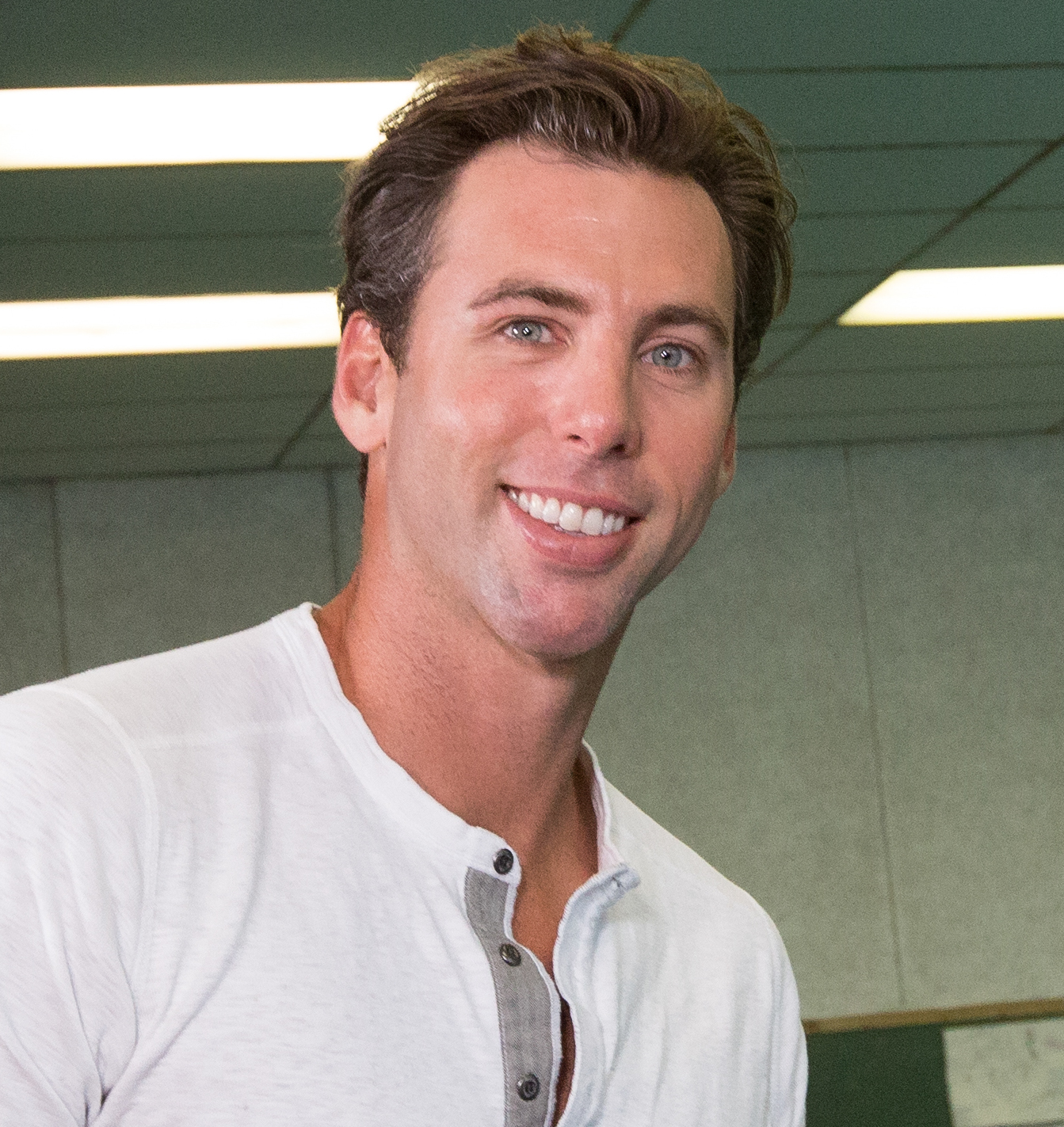
Grant Hackett, winner of the 1500 m freestyle in 2000 and 2004, captained Australia's swimming team at the 2008 Olympics.

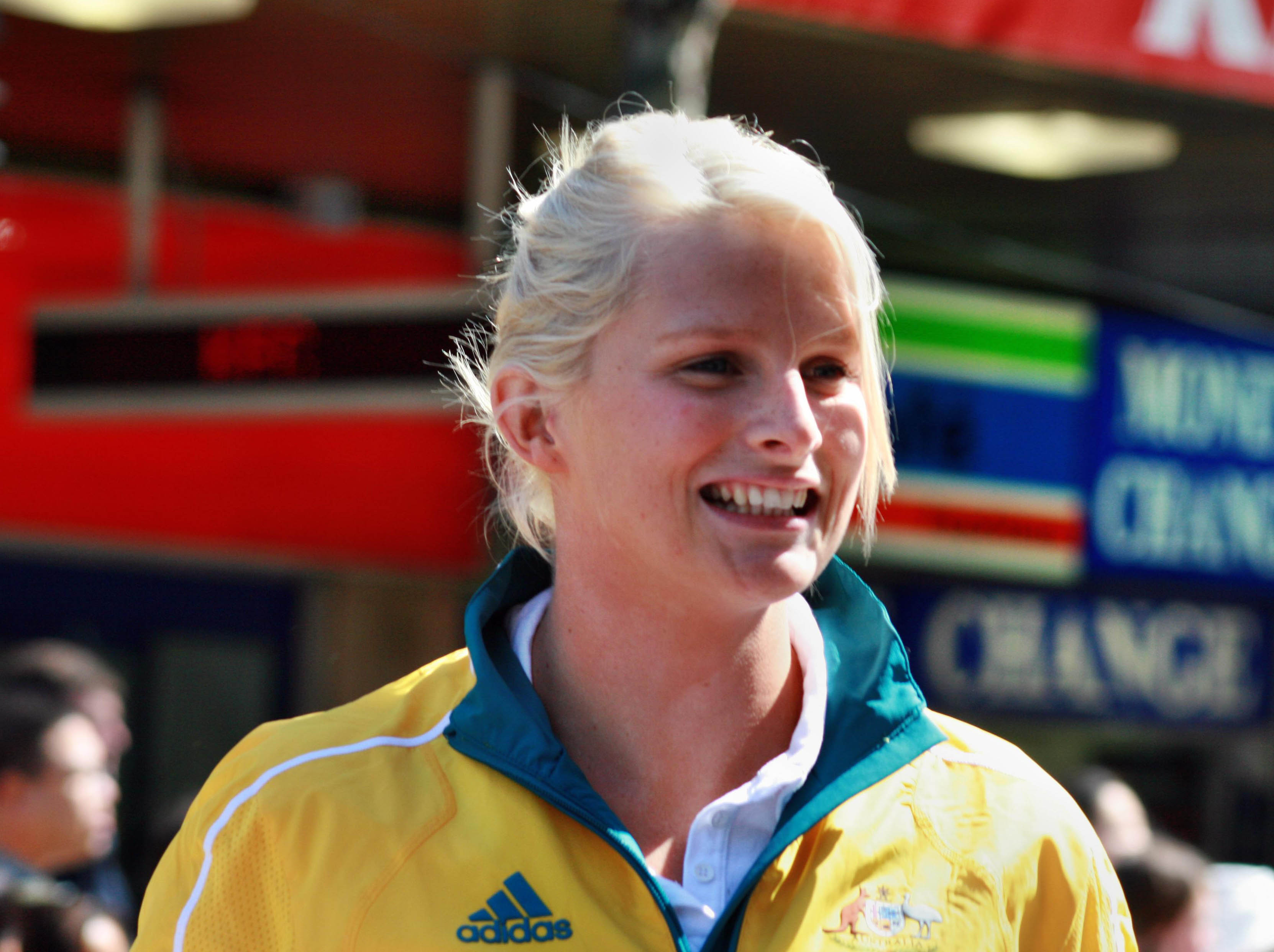
Leisel Jones has won nine Olympic medals, equal with Ian Thorpe as the second most medals won by any Australian.

Note: Years in bold indicate when a swimmer won a medal.

Athlete	Gold	Silver	Bronze	Total	Years competed
Emma McKeon	6	3	5	14	**2016**, **2020**, **2024**
Ian Thorpe	5	3	1	9	**2000**, **2004**
Kaylee McKeown	5	1	3	9	**2020**, **2024**
Mollie O'Callaghan	5	1	2	8	**2020**, **2024**
Dawn Fraser	4	4	0	8	**1956**, **1960**, **1964**
Ariarne Titmus	4	3	1	8	**2020**, **2024**
Cate Campbell	4	1	3	8	**2008**, **2012**, **2016**, **2020**
Libby Trickett	4	1	2	7	**2004**, **2008**, **2012**
Murray Rose	4	1	1	6	**1956**, **1960**
Leisel Jones	3	5	1	9	**2000**, **2004**, **2008**, **2012**
Petria Thomas	3	4	1	8	**1996**, **2000**, **2004**
Grant Hackett	3	3	1	7	**2000**, **2004**, **2008**
Emily Seebohm	3	3	1	7	**2008**, **2012**, **2016**, **2020**
Shane Gould	3	1	1	5	**1972**
Bronte Campbell	3	0	1	4	2012, **2016**, **2020**, **2024**
Jodie Henry	3	0	0	3	**2004**
Stephanie Rice	3	0	0	3	**2008**, 2012
Susie O'Neill	2	4	2	8	**1992**, **1996**, **2000**
Michael Klim	2	3	1	6	**1996**, **2000**, **2004**
Brittany Elmslie	2	3	0	5	**2012**, **2016**
Melanie Schlanger	2	2	1	5	**2008**, **2012**
Meg Harris	2	2	1	5	**2020**, **2024**
Lorraine Crapp	2	2	0	4	**1956**, **1960**
Kieren Perkins	2	2	0	4	**1992**, **1996**, **2000**
John Devitt	2	1	1	4	**1956**, **1960**
Michael Wenden	2	1	1	4	**1968**, 1972
Madison Wilson	2	1	1	4	**2016**, **2020**
Todd Pearson	2	1	0	3	**2000**, **2004**
David Theile	2	1	0	3	**1956**, **1960**
Jessicah Schipper	2	0	2	4	**2004**, **2008**, 2012
Brianna Throssell	2	0	2	4	2016, **2020**, **2024**
Alice Mills	2	0	1	3	**2004**, **2008**
Felicity Galvez	2	0	0	2	2004, **2008**
Jon Henricks	2	0	0	2	**1956**, 1960
Shayna Jack	2	0	0	2	**2024**
Freddy Lane	2	0	0	2	**1900**
Kyle Chalmers	1	3	5	9	**2016**, **2020**, **2024**
Alicia Coutts	1	3	1	5	2008, **2012**, 2016
Boy Charlton	1	3	0	4	**1924**, **1928**, 1932
Bronte Barratt	1	2	1	4	**2008**, **2012**, **2016**
Adam Pine	1	2	0	3	**2000**, 2004, **2008**
Giaan Rooney	1	2	0	3	**2000**, **2004**
Sarah Ryan	1	2	0	3	**1996**, **2000**, **2004**
Daniel Kowalski	1	1	2	4	**1996**, **2000**
Zac Stubblety-Cook	1	1	2	4	**2020**, **2024**
Bob Windle	1	1	2	4	**1964**, **1968**
Neil Brooks	1	1	1	3	**1980**, **1984**
Duncan Armstrong	1	1	0	2	**1988**, 1992
Angie Bainbridge	1	1	0	2	**2008**, **2012**
Brooke Hanson	1	1	0	2	**2004**
Cecil Healy	1	1	0	2	**1912**
Lyn McClements	1	1	0	2	**1968**
Kylie Palmer	1	1	0	2	**2008**, **2012**
Tarnee White	1	1	0	2	**2000**, **2008**
Peter Evans	1	0	3	4	**1980**, **1984**
Cameron McEvoy	1	0	3	4	2012, **2016**, **2020**, **2024**
Harold Hardwick	1	0	2	3	**1912**
John Konrads	1	0	2	3	1956, **1960**, 1964
Mark Kerry	1	0	2	3	**1980**, **1984**
Kevin Berry	1	0	1	2	1960, **1964**
Ashley Callus	1	0	1	2	**2000**, 2004, **2008**
Michelle Ford	1	0	1	2	1976, **1980**
Mack Horton	1	0	1	2	**2016**, **2020**
Faith Leech	1	0	1	2	**1956**
Ian O'Brien	1	0	1	2	**1964**, 1968
Shayne Reese	1	0	1	2	2004, **2008**
Jon Sieben	1	0	1	2	**1984**, 1988, 1992
Beverley Whitfield	1	0	1	2	**1972**
Leslie Boardman	1	0	0	1	**1912**
Malcolm Champion	1	0	0	1	**1912**
Brad Cooper	1	0	0	1	**1972**
Lara Davenport	1	0	0	1	**2008**
John Davies	1	0	0	1	1948, **1952**
Clare Dennis	1	0	0	1	**1932**
Fanny Durack	1	0	0	1	**1912**
Chris Fydler	1	0	0	1	1992, 1996, **2000**
Chelsea Hodges	1	0	0	1	**2020**
Bill Kirby	1	0	0	1	**2000**
Yolane Kukla	1	0	0	1	**2012**
Linda Mackenzie	1	0	0	1	2004, **2008**
Sandra Morgan	1	0	0	1	**1956**, 1960
Gail Neall	1	0	0	1	**1972**
Kevin O'Halloran	1	0	0	1	**1956**
Lani Pallister	1	0	0	1	**2024**
Jamie Perkins	1	0	0	1	**2024**
Mark Tonelli	1	0	0	1	1976, **1980**
Olivia Wunsch	1	0	0	1	**2024**
Frank Beaurepaire	0	3	3	6	**1908**, **1920**, **1924**
Brenton Rickard	0	2	1	3	**2008**, **2012**
Christian Sprenger	0	2	1	3	**2008**, **2012**
Mark Stockwell	0	2	1	3	**1984**
Eamon Sullivan	0	2	1	3	2004, **2008**, 2012
Matt Welsh	0	2	1	3	**2000**, 2004
Madeline Groves	0	2	0	2	**2016**
Neville Hayes	0	2	0	2	**1960**
Andrew Lauterstein	0	1	2	3	**2008**
James Magnussen	0	1	2	3	**2012**, **2016**
Samantha Riley	0	1	2	3	**1992**, **1996**
Nicole Stevenson	0	1	2	3	1988, **1992**, **1996**
Hayden Stoeckel	0	1	2	3	**2008**, **2012**
Matt Targett	0	1	2	3	**2008**, **2012**
Elijah Winnington	0	1	2	3	**2020**, **2024**
Iona Anderson	0	1	1	2	**2024**
Jan Andrew	0	1	1	2	**1960**
Tamsin Cook	0	1	1	2	**2016**, **2020**
Geoff Huegill	0	1	1	2	**2000**, 2004
Mitch Larkin	0	1	1	2	2012, **2016**, 2020
Hayley Lewis	0	1	1	2	**1992**, 1996, 2000
John Marshall	0	1	1	2	**1948**, 1952, 1956
Scott Miller	0	1	1	2	**1996**
Leah Neale	0	1	1	2	**2016**, **2020**
Greg Rogers	0	1	1	2	**1968**, 1972
Flynn Southam	0	1	1	2	**2024**
Kai Taylor	0	1	1	2	**2024**
Jessica Ashwood	0	1	0	1	2012, **2016**
Lyn Bell	0	1	0	1	**1964**, 1968
Glenn Beringen	0	1	0	1	**1984**
Dyana Calub	0	1	0	1	**2000**
Jack Cartwright	0	1	0	1	**2024**
Moss Christie	0	1	0	1	**1924**
Alva Colquhoun	0	1	0	1	**1960**
Ashley Delaney	0	1	0	1	**2008**
Michael Delany	0	1	0	1	**1984**
Helen Denman	0	1	0	1	**1996**
Blair Evans	0	1	0	1	**2012**, 2016
Greg Fasala	0	1	0	1	**1984**
Terry Gathercole	0	1	0	1	1956, **1960**
Elka Graham	0	1	0	1	**2000**, 2004
Regan Harrison	0	1	0	1	**2000**, 2004
Henry Hay	0	1	0	1	**1920**
Ernest Henry	0	1	0	1	**1924**
William Herald	0	1	0	1	**1920**
Glen Housman	0	1	0	1	**1992**, 1996
Moesha Johnson	0	1	0	1	**2024**
Angela Kennedy	0	1	0	1	**1996**
Ilsa Konrads	0	1	0	1	**1960**
Suzie Landells	0	1	0	1	**1984**
Rosemary Lassig	0	1	0	1	**1960**
Nancy Lyons	0	1	0	1	**1948**, 1952
Antony Matkovich	0	1	0	1	**2004**
Bonnie Mealing	0	1	0	1	1928, **1932**
Taylor McKeown	0	1	0	1	**2016**
Jack McLoughlin	0	1	0	1	2016, **2020**
Ryan Mitchell	0	1	0	1	1996, **2000**
John Monckton	0	1	0	1	**1956**, 1960
Janice Murphy	0	1	0	1	**1964**
Jade Neilsen	0	1	0	1	**2012**
Alexandria Perkins	0	1	0	1	**2024**
Karen Phillips	0	1	0	1	**1984**
Judy Playfair	0	1	0	1	**1968**
Ella Ramsay	0	1	0	1	**2024**
Geoff Shipton	0	1	0	1	**1960**
Nicholas Sprenger	0	1	0	1	**2004**, 2008
Ivan Stedman	0	1	0	1	**1920**, 1924
Janet Steinbeck	0	1	0	1	**1968**
Jenna Strauch	0	1	0	1	2020, **2024**
Craig Stevens	0	1	0	1	**2004**, 2008
Kirsten Thomson	0	1	0	1	**2000**
Robyn Thorn	0	1	0	1	**1964**
Jacinta van Lint	0	1	0	1	**2000**
Josh Watson	0	1	0	1	**2000**, 2004
Lynne Watson	0	1	0	1	**1968**
Marilyn Wilson	0	1	0	1	**1960**
Graham Windeatt	0	1	0	1	**1972**, 1976
Mina Wylie	0	1	0	1	**1912**
William Yang	0	1	0	1	**2024**
David Dickson	0	0	3	3	**1960**, **1964**
Zac Incerti	0	0	3	3	**2020**, **2024**
Matthew Temple	0	0	3	3	**2020**, **2024**
Leith Brodie	0	0	2	2	**2008**
Glenn Buchanan	0	0	2	2	1980, **1984**
Alexander Graham	0	0	2	2	**2020**
Patrick Murphy	0	0	2	2	2004, **2008**
Thomas Neill	0	0	2	2	**2020**, **2024**
Phil Rogers	0	0	2	2	**1992**, **1996**, 2000
Allan Wood	0	0	2	2	1960, **1964**
Matthew Abood	0	0	1	1	**2016**
Graeme Brewer	0	0	1	1	**1980**, 1984
Grant Brits	0	0	1	1	**2008**
Greg Brough	0	0	1	1	**1968**
Gary Chapman	0	0	1	1	**1956**
Isaac Cooper	0	0	1	1	**2020**, 2024
Robert Cusack	0	0	1	1	**1968**
Judy-Joy Davies	0	0	1	1	**1948**, 1952
Steven Dewick	0	0	1	1	**1996**
Peter Doak	0	0	1	1	**1964**
Nick Ffrost	0	0	1	1	**2008**
Scott Goodman	0	0	1	1	**1996**
Julia Greville	0	0	1	1	**1996**
Maximillian Giuliani	0	0	1	1	**2024**
Toby Haenen	0	0	1	1	1992, **1996**
Stephen Holland	0	0	1	1	**1976**
Emma Johnson	0	0	1	1	**1996**
Justin Lemberg	0	0	1	1	**1984**
Kareena Lee	0	0	1	1	**2020**
Lise Mackie	0	0	1	1	1992, **1996**
Julie McDonald	0	0	1	1	**1988**, 1992
Max Metzker	0	0	1	1	1976, **1980**
Karen Moras	0	0	1	1	**1968**, 1972
David Morgan	0	0	1	1	**2016**, 2020
Justin Norris	0	0	1	1	**2000**, 2004
Jake Packard	0	0	1	1	**2016**
Kirk Palmer	0	0	1	1	**2008**
Michele Pearson	0	0	1	1	1980, **1984**
Peter Reynolds	0	0	1	1	**1964**
James Roberts	0	0	1	1	2012, **2016**
John Ryan	0	0	1	1	**1964**
Brendon Smith	0	0	1	1	**2020**, 2024
Graham White	0	0	1	1	**1968**, 1972
Rob Woodhouse	0	0	1	1	**1984**, 1988
Joshua Yong	0	0	1	1	**2024**

== See also ==
- Australia at the Olympics
- Australian Olympic Committee
- List of Olympic medalists in swimming (men)
- List of Olympic medalists in swimming (women)
- Swimming at the Summer Olympics
- Swimming Australia
- Australian Swim Team
