= Swimming at the 1960 Summer Olympics – Men's 4 × 100 metre medley relay =

Men's 4 × 100 metre medley relay at the Games of the XVII Olympiad
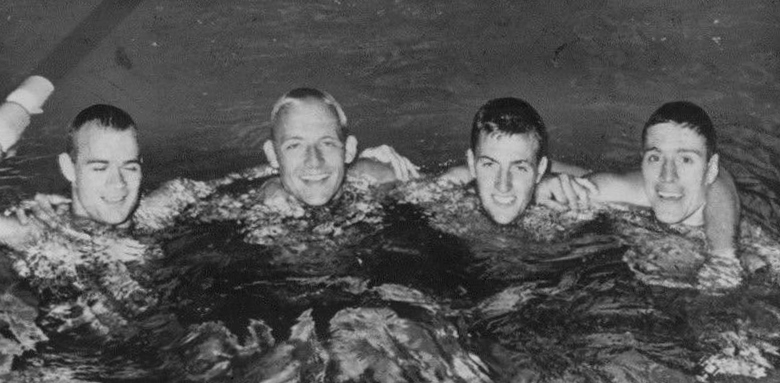
- Left-right: Jeff Ferrell, Lance Larson, Paul Hait, Frank McKinney
- Venue: Stadio Olimpico del Nuoto
- Dates: 27 August 1960 (heats); 1 September 1960 (final)
- Competitors: 80 from 18 nations
- Teams: 18
- Winning time: 4:05.4 WR

Medalists
1st place, gold medalist(s)		Frank McKinney, Paul Hait, Lance Larson, Jeff Farrell, Bob Bennett*, Dave Gillanders*, Steve Clark*	United States
2nd place, silver medalist(s)		David Theile, Terry Gathercole, Neville Hayes, Geoff Shipton, Julian Carroll*, William Burton*, Kevin Berry*	Australia
3rd place, bronze medalist(s)		Kazuo Tomita, Koichi Hirakida, Yoshihiko Osaki, Keigo Shimuzu, Kazuo Watanabe*, Katsuki Ishihara* *Indicates the swimmer only competed in the preliminary heats.	Japan

The men's 4 × 100 metre medley relay event at the 1960 Olympic Games took place on August 27 (qualification) and September 1 (final). This swimming event used medley swimming as a relay. Because an Olympic size swimming pool is 50 metres long, each of the four swimmers completed two lengths of the pool, each using a different stroke. The first on each team used the backstroke, the second used the breaststroke, the third used the butterfly stroke, and the final swimmer used freestyle (restricted to not allow any of the first three strokes to be used, though nearly all swimmers use front crawl regardless).

== Results ==
=== Heats ===
Three heats were held; the fastest eight teams advanced to the Finals. The teams that advanced are highlighted.

==== Heat One ====
Place	Swimmers	Time	Notes
1	Geoff Shipton, Julian Carroll, William Burton, Kevin Berry (AUS)	4:14.8	
2	Wolfgang Wagner, Günter Tittes, Hermann Lotter, Uwe Jacobsen (EUA)	4:17.7	
3	Robert Christophe, Roland Boullanger, Jean Pommat, Alain Gottvallès (FRA)	4:21.7	
4	Alejandro Gaxiola, Enrique Rabell, Mauricio Ocampo, Jorge Escalante (MEX)	4:23.1	
5	Ilkka Suvanto, Kari Haavisto, Stig-Olof Grenner, Karri Käyhkö (FIN)	4:27.3	
6	Joram Shnider, Gershon Shefa, Itzhak Luria, Amiram Trauber (ISR)	4:37.6	

==== Heat Two ====
Place	Swimmers	Time	Notes
1	Yoshihiko Osaki, Keigo Shimizu, Kazuo Watanabe, Katsuki Ishihara (JPN)	4:16.0	
2	Giuseppe Avellone, Roberto Lazzari, Fritz Dennerlein, Bruno Bianchi (ITA)	4:16.0	
3	Leonid Barbiyer, Leonid Kolesnikov, Grigory Kiselyov, Igor Luzhkovsky (URS)	4:16.2	
4	Graham Sykes, Christopher Walkden, Ian Black, Stanley Clarke (GBR)	4:16.8	
5	Lorenzo Cortez, Antonio Saloso, Freddie Elizalde, Bana Sailani (PHI)	4:28.0	
6	Athos de Oliveira Filho, Farid Zablith Filho, Aldo Perseke, Fernando de Abreu (BRA)	4:30.1	

==== Heat Three ====
Place	Swimmers	Time	Notes
1	Jeff Farrell, Bob Bennett, Dave Gillanders, Steve Clark (USA)	4:08.2	WR
2	Bob Wheaton, Steve Rabinovitch, Cam Grout, Dick Pound (CAN)	4:15.3	
3	Jan Jiskoot, Wieger Mensonides, Gerrit Korteweg, Ron Kroon (NED)	4:16.1	
4	József Csikány, György Kunsági, László Kiss, László Lantos (HUN)	4:17.7	
5	Mihovil Dorčić, Đorđe Perišić, Veljko Rogošić, Janez Kocmur (YUG)	4:25.5	
6	Raúl Cerqueira, Eduardo de Sousa, Luís Vaz Jorge, Herlander Ribeiro (POR)	4:39.9	

=== Final ===
Place	Swimmers	Time	Notes
1	Frank McKinney, Paul Hait, Lance Larson, Jeff Farrell (USA)	4:05.4	WR
2	David Theile, Terry Gathercole, Neville Hayes, Geoff Shipton (AUS)	4:12.0	
3	Kazuo Tomita, Koichi Hirakida, Yoshihiko Osaki, Keigo Shimuzu (JPN)	4:12.2	
4	Bob Wheaton, Steve Rabinovitch, Cam Grout, Dick Pound (CAN)	4:16.8	
5	Leonid Barbiyer, Leonid Kolesnikov, Grigory Kiselyov, Igor Luzhkovsky (URS)	4:16.8	
6	Giuseppe Avellone, Roberto Lazzari, Fritz Dennerlein, Bruno Bianchi (ITA)	4:17.2	
7	Graham Sykes, Christopher Walkden, Ian Black, Stanley Clarke (GBR)	4:17.6	
8	Jan Jiskoot, Wieger Mensonides, Gerrit Korteweg, Ron Kroon (NED)	4:18.2	
