= Jeff Farrell =

American swimmer (born 1937)

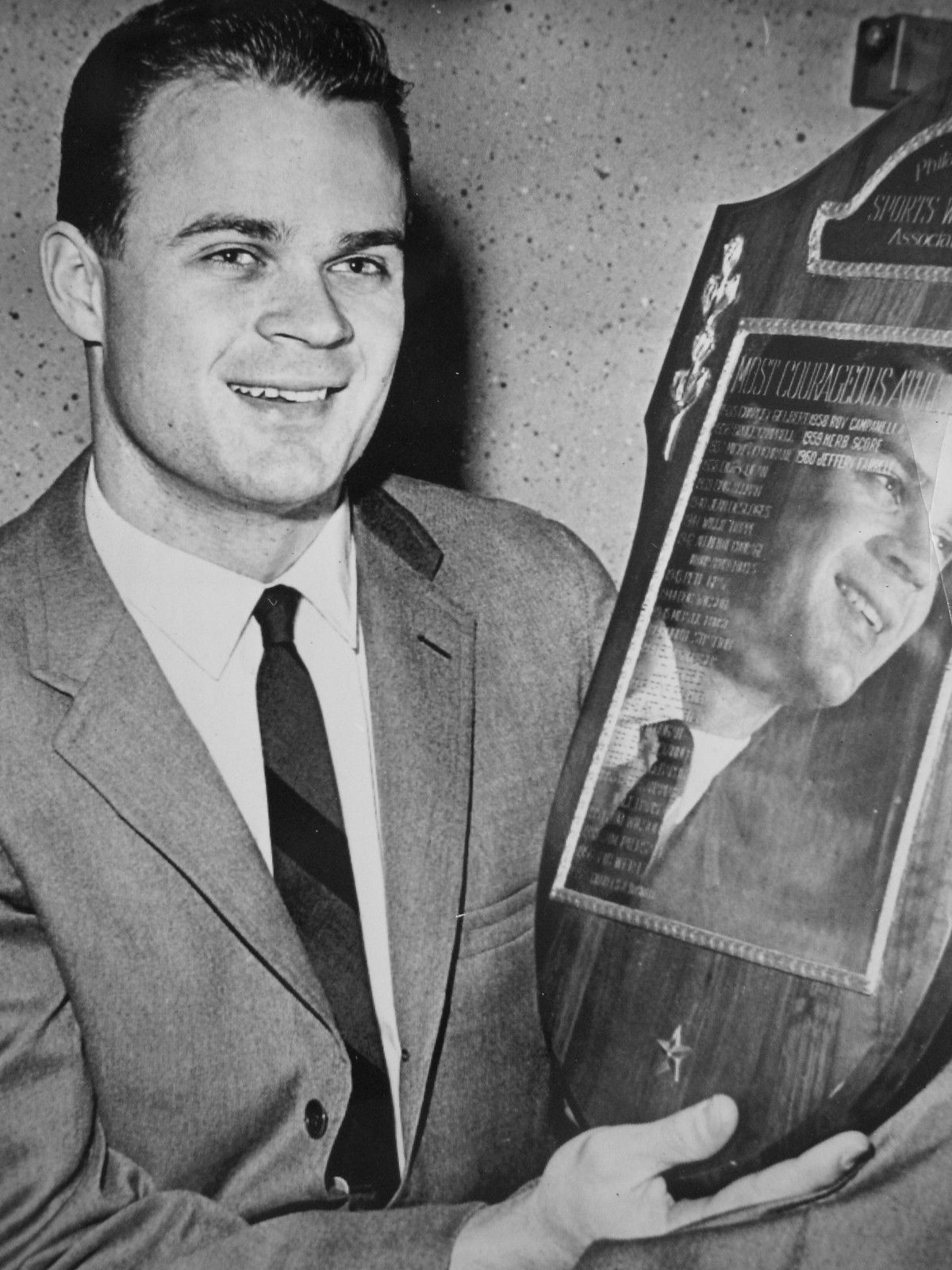
- Farrell in 1960

Personal information
- Full name: Felix Jeffrey Farrell
- Nickname: "Jeff"
- National team: United States
- Born: February 28, 1937 (age 89) Detroit, Michigan, U.S.
- Height: 6 ft 0 in (1.83 m)
- Weight: 70 kg (154 lb)

Sport
- Sport: Swimming
- Strokes: Freestyle
- Club: Wichita Swim Club; New Haven Swim Club; Santa Barbara Masters
- College team: University of Oklahoma; 1954-58
- Coach: Bob Timmons (Wichita East High); Matthew Mann (U. of Oklahoma); Bob Kiphuth (New Haven Masters)
Medal record
Representing the United States
Olympic Games
Gold medal – first place	1960 Rome	4×100 m medley
Gold medal – first place	1960 Rome	4x200 m freestyle
Pan American Games
Gold medal – first place	1959 Chicago	100 m freestyle
Gold medal – first place	1959 Chicago	4×100 m medley

Felix Jeffrey Farrell (born February 28, 1937) is a Hall of Fame American former competition swimmer, and a 1960 two-time Olympic gold medalist, where he became a world record-holder in two relay events. After the Olympics, he worked as a swim coach abroad, and in the 1980s returned to America, living in Santa Barbara, where he worked in real estate. While training with Santa Barbara Masters, he would break numerous world and national age group records as a Masters competitor between 1981 and 2011.

By 1947, at 10, Jeff swam regularly at the Wichita Country Club, and was competing as a Junior by age 12.

== Swimming for Wichita East High ==
In January 1952, while swimming for Wichita East High School, he swam a 58.7 for the 100-yard event, but would continue to lower his time threshold. At the end of February, 1953, Farrell set a new record for the 100-yard freestyle of 56.4, at a State Tournament though Wichita East lost the meet to frequent winner Coffeyville High School. By February 1953, Farrell had already swum a :56.1 for the 100-yard freestyle in High School competition, bettering the state record of 57.3, though the swim was in a regular dual meet, not in a state tournament.

Excelling in events longer than the 100 as he gained endurance in 1954, Jeff tied the National age group record for the 220-yard freestyle with a time of 2:11.8. Under Jeff's Swim Coach Bob Timmons, who would later become a legendary track coach at the University of Kansas, Wichita East swimming would eventually have eight straight undefeated seasons, 52 individual state champions, and seven state swimming titles. Benefitting from Timmons' coaching, by his Senior year Jeff was a nominee for Wichita's Downtown YMCA's Athlete of the Year Award, with only five other Wichita High School Athletes. Jeff graduated Wichita East in 1954, and was on the All-America team each year he swam.

== College swimming for Oklahoma ==
OU Coach Matt Mann

Farrell was a Freshman at University of Oklahoma in 1955, and was swimming for the school in 1956 when he set a 100-yard record of 51.4 during a meet with Kansas. In February 1958, while swimming for the Sooners under Hall of Fame coach Matthew Mann, he set a new pool record in the 100-yard sprint of 52.8 at a Big 8 meet. Jeff made the All-American team each year at the University of Oklahoma. In the full span of his swimming career, Farrell took six national championships in the 100 and 200-meter freestyle swim events, and at various times set 25 American, world and Olympic records. Jeff graduated from Oklahoma around 1958.

=== Pan Am Games ===
In early September, Farrell won two gold medals at the 1959 Pan American Games in Chicago, in the men's 100-meter freestyle (56.3), and the Men's 4x100-meter medley. Besides Jeff, the 4x100-meter medley team consisted of Frank McKinney, Mike Troy, and Kenneth Nakasone who was not an Olympian. Both events were completed in Pan Am Games record time.

== Swimming at Yale ROTC program ==
Jeff enrolled in the Navy ROTC Program at Yale by 1959 and was first commissioned as an ensign, swimming with Hall of Fame Yale coaches Bob Kiphuth and on occasion Phil Moriarty, though primarily in American Athletic Union competition, as his collegiate eligibility was completed at the University of Oklahoma. Jeff swam with some frequency with the U.S. team in 1959 and 1960 in International competition. While at the Yale ROTC and graduate program, Farrell swam at times with former Yale Coach Bob Kiphuth's New Haven Swim Club. Four months before the Olympic trials, while out of collegiate competition in April 1960 at 23, Jeff, as a Lieutenant Junior Grade would break records in the 100-yard freestyle with a 48.2, and another record in the 220-yard freestyle at the National Men's AAU Championship, held in the Yale Pool. Jeff would hold his ROTC Lieutenant's commission in 1960, and graduate with a Masters from Yale in 1963.

== 1960 Rome Olympics ==
=== 1960 Olympic trials ===
Jeff, bandage above suit, Aug. 2, '60 Trials

On August 2, 1960, only six days after having an emergency appendectomy on July 27, Jeff qualified at the U.S. Olympic Trials in Detroit. Despite swimming with his lower stomach tightly bandaged, and still having his stitches, Jeff won both his first preliminary heat and the semi-final heat for the 100-meters. He placed third in the final but was not selected as he needed to be in the top two finishers.

Farrell did qualify for selection in the 4x200-meter freestyle relay, after finishing fourth in the 200-metre final, with the first six being selected for the relay squad.

== Two Olympic gold medals ==
With only a little over a month to recover from his appendectomy, he had success at the 1960 Olympic Games in Rome in early September, where he received gold medals as a member of the winning U.S. teams in the 4×100-meter medley relay, and the 4×200-meter freestyle relay. At the 1960 Olympics, he was managed by Olympics Head Coach Gus Stager, who was then Michigan Head Coach.

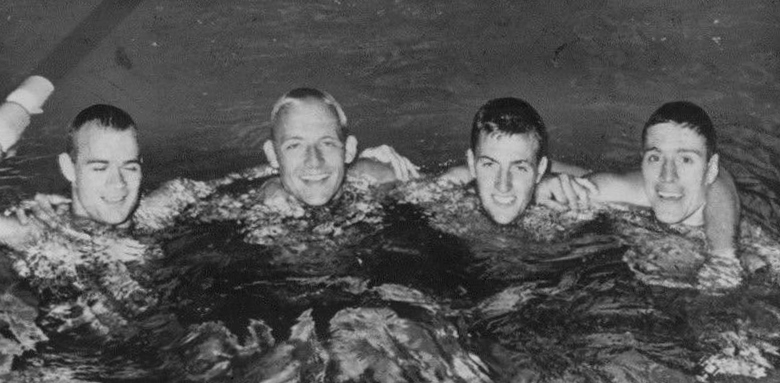
1960 U.S. 4x100 Olympic medley team, (left to right) Ferrell, Larson, Hait, McKinney

Shown at left, the gold medal-winning American Olympic team in the 4x100 meter medley relay, had Frank McKinney swim first as backstroker, Lance Larson swim second with butterfly, Paul Hait swim third with breaststroke, and Jeff swim last with freestyle. The Medley team's time of 4:05.4, set both a new Olympic and World record, with Jeff completing his anchor swim in 54.9.

The American team's gold medal-winning time in the 4x200 meter freestyle relay, in which Jeff again swam last, was 8:10.2, which was also both a new Olympic and World record, and bettered the old world record by 6 seconds.

== Post-olympic swimming ==
Continuing to swim after the Olympics, within a year of his appendectomy, Farrell broke a combined 23 American and World records. After the Olympics in Rome, Jeff lived abroad, coaching a number of foreign swim teams.

=== U.S. Master's swimming ===
He returned to the U.S. to live in Santa Barbara, California in 1980, and began to swim with United States Masters Swimming. His comeback could be attributed to his Master's coach Judy Bonning, who helped him modernize his starts and turns, and make his workouts more efficient. Judy coached for around five years at Santa Barbara Masters in Jeff's early years swimming there. Although it seems a rare occurrence, in essence, through around the age of sixty Farrell retained most of his speed and appears to have diminished the process of aging, demonstrating a loss in time of just three one hundredths of second per year. Farrell is a multiple U.S. Masters Swimming world-record holder, and has held the fastest national times in his age group in dozens of events over the past decades. He has set 27 FINA Master's World Records, primarily in freestyle, but a few in the individual medley and one in the breast stroke. He was photographed for and featured in ESPN's "The Body" issue in 2010. He set world records for Masters Swimming up until 2011, and was credited as a United States Masters Swimming All American thirty-two times from 1982 to 2022.

== Wichita Swim Club ==
In 1991, he was on-hand to dedicate the new 50-meter x 25-yard Olympic size pool on Wichita's East Douglas, the home of Wichita Swim Club, where he had been an active member and occasional swimmer through 1960. Hired in November, 1984, the club at the time was coached by Rob Snowberger, a former two-year University of Alabama Assistant Coach under Hall of Fame Head Coach Don Gambril, who had coached world class freestyle sprinters Jonty Skinner and Jack Babashoff. Between 1954 and 1964, the club was coached by Bob Timmons, Jeff's swim coach at Wichita East, and Jeff periodically swam for the club when not engaged with his High School or College teams. Timmons started the Wichita Club in 1953.

=== Living in Santa Barbara ===
Jeff has been living in Santa Barbara, California, with his wife Gabrielle and two children since the early 1980s, where he has trained and on occasion travelled to compete with Santa Barbara Masters. He has worked as a Realtor for Coldwell Banker and has worked in the field of real estate primarily in the Santa Barbara area since the 1980s. Farrell was named one of “America’s Most Referred Realtors” and was a recipient of the R.F. McFarland Award as a community leader.

== Honors ==
Farrell was inducted into the International Swimming Hall of Fame in 1968, and the International Masters Swimming Hall of Fame in 2011. He is the only swimmer to be inducted into both halls. He was made a member of the Kansas Sports Hall of Fame in 1961. He was honored by the Los Angeles Times receiving their National Sports Award, and the American Athletic Union Swimming Award. He has also been inducted into the Helms Foundation Athletic Hall of Fame, and California's Santa Barbara Athletic Round Table Hall of Fame. He was the first competitor to go under 2 minutes for the 200-meter freestyle, and the first to go under 56 and 55 seconds in the 100-meter freestyle.

He has written a book about his Olympic experiences titled My Olympic Story, Rome 1960.

== See also ==
- List of members of the International Swimming Hall of Fame
- List of Olympic medalists in swimming (men)
- List of Yale University people
- World record progression 4 × 100 metres freestyle relay
- World record progression 4 × 100 metres medley relay
- World record progression 4 × 200 metres freestyle relay
