= Paul Hait =

American swimmer (born 1940)

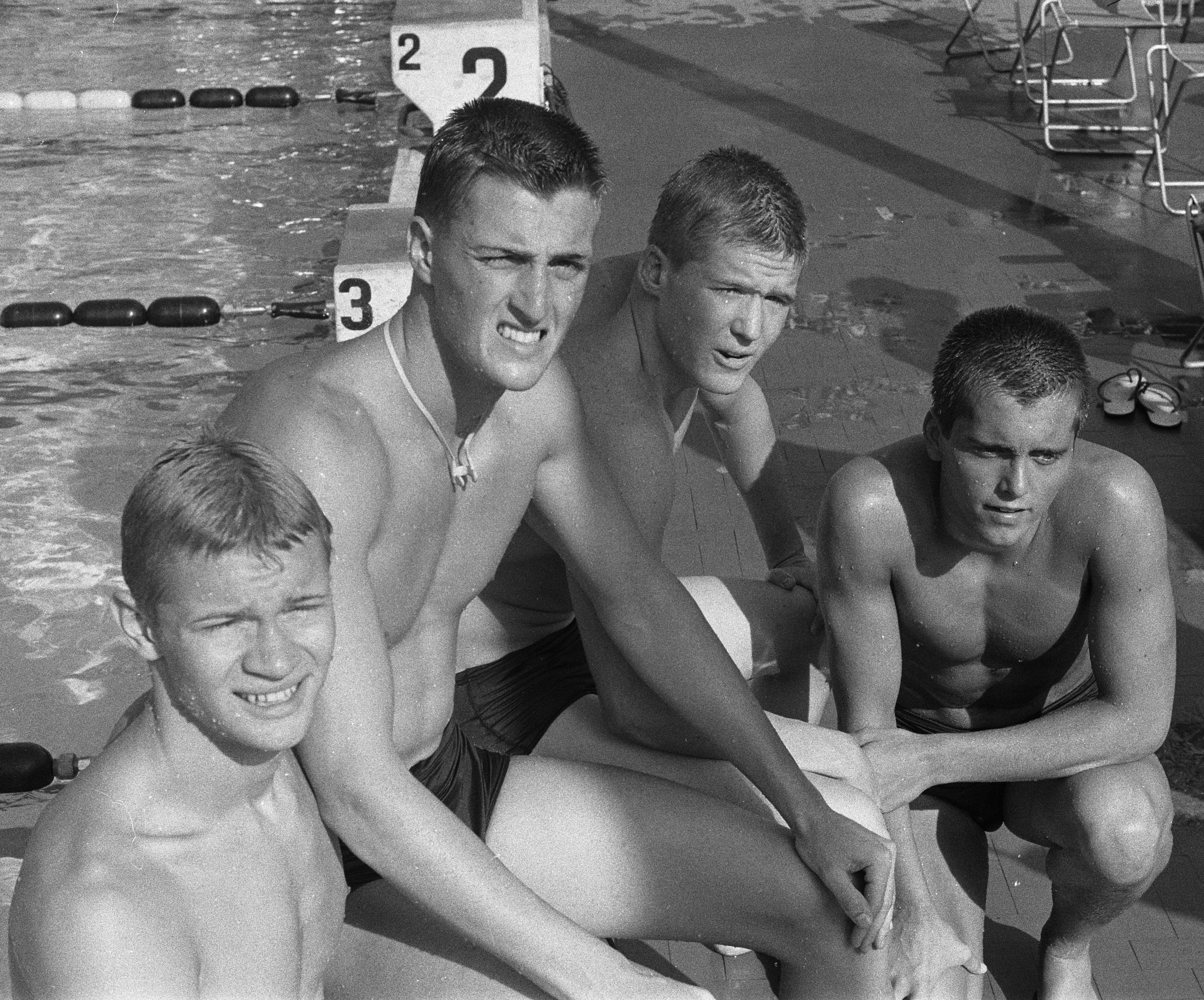
- Bennett, Hait, Clark and Gillanders after breaking 4×100-meter world record in 1960 Olympic heats

Personal information
- Full name: Paul William Hait
- National team: United States
- Born: May 25, 1940 (age 86) Pasadena, California, U.S.
- Height: 6 ft 4 in (1.93 m)
- Weight: 198 lb (90 kg)

Sport
- Sport: Swimming
- Strokes: Breaststroke
- Club: Santa Clara Swim Club
- College team: Stanford University
- Coach: Jim Gaughran (Stanford)
Medal record
Men's swimming
Representing the United States
Olympic Games
Gold medal – first place	1960 Rome	4×100 m medley

Paul William Hait (born May 25, 1940) is an American former competition swimmer and breaststroke specialist who swam for Stanford University and is a 1960 Rome Olympic champion and former world record-holder. After graduating Stanford as a Mechanical Engineer and Industrial Designer in 1963, he served as an engineer with Varian Industries from 1963-68, founded the California-based food company Aroma Taste in 1970, and designed small energy efficient grills and stoves while serving as President for the Pyromid Corporation from 1981-2000. As an inventor, he would eventually hold over 70 patents, many as a result of his work with Varian Industries, and Pyromid Corporation. He would work as an artist in his later career.

Hait was born in Passadena, California on May 25, 1940, though he would grow up North in the San Jose area where he attended James Lick High School, graduating in 1958. At James Lick, where he swam for three years and served as team Captain, he was coached by Gene Nyquist, a Pacific College swimmer, who mentored 86 All-American swimmers and four Olympic medalists during his coaching tenure. At the Carlmont Invitational Aqua-Pentathalon on May 17, 1958, swimming for James Lick High, Hait set a High School record in the 100-yard breaststroke with a time of 1:10.6. The time, and his subsequent records led him to eventually receive honors as an All-American in 1960. He swam for the highly competitive Santa Clara Swim Club by 1960, then under Hall of Fame Coach George Haines.

== American record ==
He attended and swam for Stanford University from around 1958-63 under Coach Jim Gaughran. At the June, 1960, Los Angeles Invitational Swim Meet, he broke the American record for the 100-meter breaststroke with a time of 1:14.0.

== 1960 Rome Olympics ==
At the August, 1960 Olympic Trials in Detroit, Hait won the 100-meter breaststroke final with a time of 1:13.5, qualifying him for the Rome Olympics and matching his former American record time for the event.

After training and travelling with the American team, he won a gold medal in the 4×100 m medley relay at the 1960 Summer Olympics in Rome, where he swam in the preliminary heats (with Steve Clark, Bob Bennett and Dave Gillanders). On September 1, he swam in the breaststroke leg of the medley final (with Frank McKinney, Lance Larson and Jeff Farrell), breaking the world record in both the heats and the finals. The American 4x100 world record relay time in the finals was 4:05.4, handily defeating the Australian team by seven seconds. 1960 was the first year the 4x100 medley relay was held as an Olympic event, though American teams would continue to medal in the event for many years.

On August 31, 1960, swimming individually, he finished eighth in the men's 200-meter breaststroke with a time of 2:41.4. At the 1960 Olympics Hait was managed by first time Olympic Coach Gus Stager, a former University of Michigan swimmer who also coached at the University from 1955-1979.

=== Stanford University era ===
As a Freshman at Stanford around 1958, Hait injured his back after slipping during a locker room towel fight, and later had surgery that required ten months of recovery time. After recovering, he began training for the Olympic trials, though he initially had a weak kick due to the injury. Hait would graduate Stanford with a degree in Mechanical Engineering and Industrial Design in 1963. As a Senior at Stanford on July 23, 1961 at the Los Angeles Invitational, while representing the Santa Clara Swim Club, he won the men's 100-meter breaststroke in a time of 1:12.2, only seven-tenths of a second off the world record. At the August 19, 1961 Men's AAU Outdoor National Swimming Championships in Los Angeles, Hait very briefly broke the world record for the 200-meter breaststroke placing second in the event with a time of 2:34.5, though Chet Jastremski, who took first in the event eclipsed Hait's record with a time of 2:29.6. The prior record of 2:36.5 had been set in 1958. The National Championships's times for Hait's record breaking swim would not have been in many record books as it stood only five seconds. Hait would graduate Stanford with a degree in Mechanical Engineering.

As late as 1974, Hait continued to swim recreationally with United States Masters Swimming and represented the Santa Clara Swim Club, where in 1974 he completed a long course 100-meter breaststroke in 1:16.34 at the age of 34. The time was highly competitive for his age group.

=== Post-swimming careers ===
After completing his engineering and design degree from Stanford in 1963, he worked with Varian Associates in Palo Alto, California through 1968 where he helped with the development of the klystron tube, a microwave tube that was instrumental in transmitting the 1964 Olympics via satellite. The Klystron tube was the earliest vacuum tube that amplified electromagnetic waves at microwave frequencies. In one of his first successful personal business ventures, he founded Aroma Taste Inc. in 1970, a Sunnyvale, California-based producer of Pemican Beef Jerkey, which eventually grew into a multi-million dollar business. Aroma Taste produced eight types of meat snacks, which were distributed primarily on the West Coast. In 1978, he sold Aroma Taste to General Mills for a substantial sum.

From 1981-2002, he was President of Pyromid Corporation, and designed the Pyromid, a small, six pound portable, energy efficient, stainless steel charcoal burning grill, which came in several sizes and used a pyramid design to focus heat. The product evolved to feature several types of small fuel efficient stoves, which could use other fuels including sticks and twigs and utilized the pyramid design. Pyromid Vice-President Dan Roher helped with the concept of the product as early as 1980. Another grilling design product he helped develop was the Pyrobachi, which featured both a 12 by 12 inch, and 18 by 18 inch grill. The Pyrobachi included an oven, griddle, and windguard, was widely marketed and available at a few major retail outlets. Retiring as Chairman in 2013, after 2006 he was a founder of US Organic Marketing, a company that later became US Rare Earth Minerals, Inc. After 2014, he worked as a design consultant for a variety of products. Over the course of his career he was responsible for over 70 patents, and later focused on producing art by 2021, living in the Redmond, Oregon area. Among the art he painted was a series known as birds of the Isabel which included a Quail, a Black Capped Chicadee, a Canadian Goose and a Magpie, which were later sold on canvas as surfaces for needlepoint.

He married the daughter of Thomas Topp, and was married to his wife Betsy for over 50 years. He and Betsy had three children and three grandchildren.

== See also ==
- List of Olympic medalists in swimming (men)
- List of Stanford University people
- World record progression 4 × 100 metres medley relay
