= Swimming at the 1959 Pan American Games – Men's 4 × 100 metre medley relay =

Men's 4 × 100 metre medley relay at the I959 Pan American Games
- Venue: -
- Dates: September 2 (preliminaries and finals)

Medalists
Gold medal	Frank McKinney; Frederick Munsch; Mike Troy; Jeff Farrell	United States
Silver medal	-	Canada
Bronze medal	-	Mexico

The men's 4 × 100 metre medley relay competition of the swimming events at the 1959 Pan American Games took place on 2 September. The defending Pan American Games champion is the United States.

== Results ==
All times are in minutes and seconds.

KEY:	Q	Qualified for finals	GR	Games record	NR	National record	PB	Personal best	SB	Seasonal best

=== Heats ===
The first round was held on September 2.

Rank	Heat	Name	Nationality	Time	Notes
1	1	- - - -	Canada	4:25.0	Q, GR
2	1	- - - -	Mexico	4:28.0	Q
3	2	- - - -	United States	4:30.4	Q
4	1	- - - -	Argentina	4:34.4	Q
5	2	Athos de Oliveira; Daltely Guimarães; Newton de Thuin; Manuel dos Santos	Brazil	4:37.4	Q
6	2	- - - -	Cuba	4:38.0	Q
7	2	- - - -	Peru	4:38.8	Q
8	1	- - - -	Ecuador	4:54.4	Q

=== Final ===
The final was held on September 2.

Rank	Name	Nationality	Time	Notes
1st place, gold medalist(s)	Frank McKinney; Frederick Munsch; Mike Troy; Jeff Farrell	United States	4:14.9	GR
2nd place, silver medalist(s)	- - - -	Canada	4:23.3	
3rd place, bronze medalist(s)	- - - -	Mexico	4:25.0	
4	- - - -	-	-	
5	- - - -	-	-	
6	- - - -	-	-	
7	- - - -	-	-	
8	- - - -	-	-	
