= Itzhak Luria (swimmer) =

Israeli swimmer

Personal information
- Native name: יצחק לוריא
- Born: 3 November 1940 (age 85)

Sport
- Sport: Swimming

Itzhak Luria (Hebrew: יצחק לוריא; born 3 November 1940) is an Israeli former swimmer. He competed in two events at the 1960 Summer Olympics.
