= 1960 NCAA swimming and diving championships =

American college aquatic sports competition

- Host city: University Park, Texas
- Date(s): March 1960
- Venue(s): Perkins Natatorium; Southern Methodist University
- Teams: 18
- Events: 16

The 1960 NCAA swimming and diving championships were contested in March 1960 at Perkins Natatorium at Southern Methodist University in University Park, Texas at the 24th annual officially NCAA-sanctioned swim meet to determine the team and individual national champions of men's collegiate swimming and diving in the United States. Including the pre-NCAA events from before 1937, these were the 36th overall collegiate swimming and diving championships.

The program featured sixteen individual events, fourteen in swimming and two for diving. Teams earned points based on their placement in individual events, with the highest-earning team receiving the national title.

USC claimed their first team national title after finishing fourteen points ahead of three-time defending champions Michigan in the team standings.

== Team standings ==
- (H) = Hosts
- (DC) = Defending champions
- Italics = Debut appearance

Rank	Team	Points
1st place, gold medalist(s)	USC	87
2nd place, silver medalist(s)	Michigan (DC)	73
3rd place, bronze medalist(s)	Indiana	69
4	Harvard	35
5	Stanford	26
6	Yale	25
7	Ohio State	23
8	Miami (OH)	8 1/2
9	Wisconsin	7 1/2
10	San José State	7
10	SMU (H)	7
12	Oklahoma	6
13	Iowa	5
13	Southern Illinois	5
15	Bowling Green State	4
16	Michigan State	3
16	Minnesota	3
18	Navy	2

== Individual events ==
=== Swimming ===
Event	Champion	Team	Time
50 yard freestyle	Bruce Hunter	Harvard	21.9
100 yard freestyle	Peter Lusk	Yale	49.4
220 yard freestyle	Tom Winters	USC	2:02.1
440 yard freestyle	Dennis Rounsavelle	USC	4:24.0
1,500 meter freestyle	William Chase	Yale	17:48.7
100 yard backstroke	Charles Bittick	USC	54.4
200 yard backstroke	Charles Bittick	USC	2:00.1
100 yard breaststroke	Thomas Peterson	Stanford	1:03.1
200 yard breaststroke	Ron Clark	Michigan	2:17.6
100 yard butterfly	Mike Troy	Indiana	53.1
200 yard butterfly	Mike Troy	Indiana	1:57.8
200 yard individual medley	Lance Larson	USC	2:03.2
400 yard freestyle relay	Donald Redington; Robert Mounton; Lance Larson; Jon Henrichs	USC	3:18.5
400 yard medley relay	Frank McKinney; Gerald Miki; Mike Troy; Peter Sintz	Indiana	3:40.8

=== Diving ===
Event	Champion	Team	Score
1 meter diving	Sam Hall	Ohio State	510.95
3 meter diving	Sam Hall (DC)	Ohio State	503.6

== See also ==
- NAIA men's swimming and diving championships
- List of college swimming and diving teams
