= David Theile =

Australian swimmer (born 1938)

David Theile AO
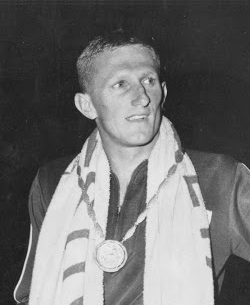
- David Theile at the 1960 Olympics

Personal information
- Full name: David Egmont Theile
- National team: Australia
- Born: 17 January 1938 (age 88) Maryborough, Queensland
- Height: 1.90 m (6 ft 3 in)

Sport
- Sport: Swimming
- Strokes: Backstroke
- Club: Maryborough Swimming Club
Medal record
Representing Australia
Olympic Games
Gold medal – first place	1956 Melbourne	100 m backstroke
Gold medal – first place	1960 Rome	100 m backstroke
Silver medal – second place	1960 Rome	4×100 m medley relay

David Egmont Theile, AO (born 17 January 1938) is an Australian former backstroke swimmer of the 1950s and 1960s, who won consecutive gold medals in the 100-metre backstroke at the 1956 and 1960 Summer Olympics, the only Australian to do so. He subsequently became a leading surgeon and medical administrator.

== Swimming career ==
Theile was born in Maryborough to Alice and Egmont Theile, who ran a husband and wife medical practice. Both had graduated from the University of Sydney, with his father originally being of German descent. He learnt to swim at the age of five, along with his three sisters after being enrolled in a swimming program by his parents. He developed a love of swimming, which relieved him from the boredom of the town, as "the local pool gave us something to do".

By the age of 10, Theile was enjoying success at local swimming carnivals, so his father offered to arrange for him to be coached, but left Theile with the choice of coaches. Of the two coaches in the town, Theile chose Arthur Cusack, who had a reputation as a physical training instructor of whom Theile recounted as being "tough and enthusiastic. All my friends avoided him....somehow I sensed that it was an important decision." Cusack turned out to be his lifelong coach. Under the guidance of Cusack, Maryborough Swimming Club challenged the metropolitan clubs in Brisbane for statewide supremacy. Theile won Queensland junior and open titles in all four strokes. In 1954, at the age of 16, he came second in the open backstroke, and after becoming the national junior champion that year, he decided to concentrate on the given stroke. In 1955, he captured the 110yd backstroke title at the Australian Championships in Adelaide. At the same time, Theile completed his secondary education and was awarded an academic scholarship to study medicine at the University of Queensland.

In 1956, he was selected to represent Australia in the Melbourne Olympics, and he was forced to defer his studies. He won the 110 yd Queensland backstroke title before retaining his Australian title in Sydney. He joined the Australian team at the 12-week winter camp in Townsville, where he worked under the tutelage of Forbes Carlile. At the Townsville camp, Theile initially swam slower in the time trials than John Monckton and John Hayres, but eventually defeated them in the final time trials. At a later Brisbane event, he won again in 64.5 s, but Monckton defeated him in Sydney with a new record time of 63.3 s. However, Theile later struck back with a time of 62.9 s at the final trials in Melbourne, setting a new world record for long-course events.

At the 1956 Olympics, only a 100-metre backstroke event existed, in which there were 25 competitors. Theile won his heat to qualify second fastest for the semifinals behind Monckton, who set an Olympic record in his heat. After some officials had questioned his turning style during the heats, Theile refused to give a demonstration to the judges as his team manager had previously promised them. He used a conventional in the semifinals as did the others, coming second to Monckton to progress to the final. In the final Theile made a good start and seized the lead from the start, never relinquishing it to win by more than a metre and a half from Monckton, setting a new world and Olympic record.

Subsequent to the Olympic Games were the 1957 Queensland Championships, where Theile was disqualified for the only time in his career, after officials ruled that he had performed an illegal turn. Theile resumed his university studies in medicine, and skipped the Australian Championships, allowing Monckton to win both the 110 yd and 220 yd backstroke events. In 1958, Monckton took the 110 yd backstroke world record as National Service prevented Theile from competing. Theile also skipped the 1958 Empire Games in Cardiff to pursue his academic career. In 1959, he competed in the Australian Championships at the behest of the Australian Swimming Federation, who paid his fares to Hobart to compete, where he won the 110 yd title in a time of 64 s, well outside his best. He subsequently returned to medical studies for the rest of the year, when he moved to Warwick, Queensland, south of Brisbane to resume training with Cusack.

Theile won the 1960 Australian Championships before deciding on an attempt to defend his Olympic title. Again, he had to attend a winter training camp in Townsville, which necessitated him applying for special consideration from his university, which obliged by allowing him to undergo his training during the year at Townsville Hospital. He was able to train with Cusack in Townsville, who was appointed as a team coach. Theile won the final trials in Townsville to gain selection for his second Olympics, along with Monckton.

Theile arrived in Rome as an outsider, despite being the defending champion as he had not regained his form of four years prior, with Robert Bennett and Frank McKinney of the United States posting faster times. This appeared to be the case in the heats, with Theile posting the third fastest time behind the American duo. In the semifinals, Bennett was unable to repeat his earlier performance and Theile won, while McKinney won the other semifinal, also in a time slower than Theile. Theile was confident approaching the final, recounting "I had great faith in myself and my abilities. I had a short, sharp peak, which meant that I had to save everything for that burst and then exert everything I had for precisely that moment." Theile attacked at the outset in the final, as was his style, and held a slender lead at the 50-metre mark over McKinney and Bennett. Theile made a good turn, lengthening his lead to half a body length, before holding off a late surge to claim consecutive gold medals, defeating McKinney by just 0.2 s, setting a new Olympic record in the event. For the first time, the 4×100-metre medley relay was contested at the Olympics, and combining with Terry Gathercole, Neville Hayes and Geoff Shipton, the Australians finished well behind the Americans to win the silver medal.

After the games, FINA announced that the 100-metre would be dropped in favour of the 200-metre backstroke. Theile, a sprinter, immediately announced his retirement thereafter. He completed his medical studies in 1962, and was a member of the organising committee of the 1982 Commonwealth Games held in Brisbane.

== Medical career ==
Theile undertook post-graduate training as a Resident and Surgical Registrar at the Royal Brisbane and Women's Hospital, and was awarded a fellowship of the Royal Australasian College of Surgeons in 1967. After obtaining further experience in the United Kingdom, in 1974 he entered private practice as a general surgeon in Brisbane, and was appointed to the visiting staff of the Princess Alexandra Hospital.

Over the succeeding 25 years, Theile earned an array of professional accolades. Alongside his fellowship of the Royal Australasian College of Surgeons, he was made a fellow of the Royal College of Surgeons of England, an Honorary Fellow of the Royal College of Surgeons of Edinburgh, and an Honorary Fellow of the Australian and New Zealand College of Anaesthetists. He holds three honorary professorships, and is an honorary member of the medical academies of both Singapore and Malaysia. He has been awarded an honorary Doctorate of Philosophy by the University of Queensland, and is an Officer of the Order of Australia. He is currently appointed as the chief executive officer of the Metro South Health Service District.

Apart from his clinical practice, Theile also began to take an active part in professional affairs. From 1981, he held a variety of positions with the Royal Australian College of Surgeons, culminating in the presidency between 1993 and 1995. He served on the Australian Medical Workforce Advisory Committee. He chaired the Pacific Islands Project for AusAid. He became chairman of the Division of Surgery at the Princess Alexandra Hospital in 2000, and in 2006 became its Clinical chief executive officer. In 2001, Theile was awarded the highest honour from the Royal Australasian College of Surgeons, the Sir Hugh Devine Medal. In late 2008 he was appointed chief executive officer of the Metro South District of Queensland Health.

Theile has two sons.

As an Olympic swimmer, Theile's name was pronounced in the original Germanic form, sounding like Tyler. Theile later adopted an Anglicised pronunciation, rhyming with meal.

== Honours ==
Theile was inducted into the International Swimming Hall of Fame in 1968 and the Sport Australia Hall of Fame in 1985. He was made an Officer of the Order of Australia in 1997 for his services to surgery and received an Australian Sports Medal in 2000. The University of Queensland pool was renamed in his honour. In 2025, he was inducted into Swimming Australia Hall of Fame.

== See also ==
- List of members of the International Swimming Hall of Fame
- List of Olympic medalists in swimming (men)
- World record progression 100 metres backstroke
