= Grigory Kiselyov =

Soviet swimmer

Personal information
- Born: 30 August 1937 Smolensk, Soviet Union
- Died: 16 December 2000 (aged 63) Moscow, Russia

Sport
- Sport: Swimming
Medal record
Representing Soviet Union
Summer Universiade
Silver medal – second place	1961 Sofia	200m butterfly

Grigory Kiselyov (30 August 1937 – 16 December 2000) was a Soviet swimmer. He competed in two events at the 1960 Summer Olympics.
