= Kazuo Watanabe =

Japanese swimmer (born 1938)

Personal information
- Born: 5 February 1938 (age 88) Tokyo, Japan

Sport
- Sport: Swimming
- Strokes: backstroke
Medal record
Representing Japan
Asian Games
Silver medal – second place	1958 Tokyo	200m backstroke

Kazuo Watanabe (渡辺 和夫, Watanabe Kazuo; born 5 February 1938) is a Japanese former backstroke swimmer. He competed in two events at the 1960 Summer Olympics.
