= Forbes Carlile =

Australian Olympic swimming coach (1921–2016)

Forbes Carlile MBE
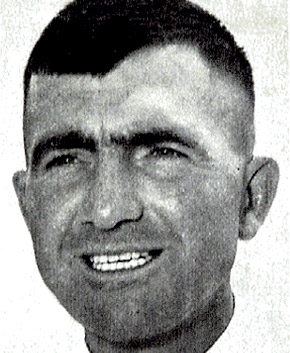
- Forbes Carlile

Personal information
- Born: 3 June 1921 Armadale, Victoria, Australia
- Died: 2 August 2016 (aged 95) Sydney, Australia

Sport
- Sport: Modern pentathlon, Swimming (coaching)

Forbes Carlile MBE (3 June 1921 – 2 August 2016) was Australia's first post-World War II Olympics swimming coach and later Australia's first competitor in the modern pentathlon at the 1952 Summer Olympics in Helsinki. He remains the only person to have coached and later competed at the Olympic Games.

Born in Armadale, Victoria, Carlile is best known as a pioneer in swimming coaching. Together with his wife, Ursula, and their assistant, Tom Green, he produced many notable olympians such as Shane Gould, Karen Moras, Gail Neall, John Davies, Terry Gathercole, John Ryan and Ian O'Brien. In 1972, 15-year-old Gould held world records simultaneously in the 100, 200, 400, 800 and 1500 metres freestyle and the 200m individual medley.

Carlile started testing his physiological knowledge in 1944 at the Enfield pool with two young schoolboys from Canterbury Boys' High School. He first started coaching in 1946 at the Palm Beach rock pool, north of Sydney. Success there led to him being appointed as the Australian swimming coach for the 1948 Summer Olympics in London and he then went on to be head Australian coach again at the 1956 Games in Melbourne and Scientific Advisor in the 1960 Games in Rome. At the 1964 Games he was head coach for the Dutch Olympic team. He was head Australian swimming coach at the Swimming World Championships in Belgrade in 1973. He withdrew as head coach at the 1980 Moscow Olympics.

Carlile studied at The Scots College, Sydney and the University of Sydney under Professor Frank Cotton, graduating with a Masters of Science and later lecturing there in human physiology. His pioneering work on elite athlete training methods included interval workouts, pace clocks and log books, heart rate tests, training under stress and T Wave studies of the ventricles. He developed techniques such as even-paced swimming and the use of two-beat kicks for long-distance events.

His book, Forbes Carlile on Swimming (London. 1963), was the first modern book on competitive swimming with its study of tapering and the historical development of the crawl. Other books by Carlile include: A History of Crawl Stroke Techniques to the 1960s: An Australian Perspective and A History of Australian Swimming Training. In 1977, Carlile was awarded an MBE and was inducted into the International Swimming Hall of Fame. Other awards include the Queens Jubilee Medal (1977), Sport Australia Hall of Fame (1989), ASI Life Member (2003) and NSSA Hall of Fame (2003). His swimming school operates in a number of locations in and around Sydney, with former New Zealand Olympic swimmer John Coutts as director.

Following the death of fencer Joy Hardon on 21 July 2016, it was erroneously reported that he had become Australia's oldest living Olympian, when in fact he was already the oldest having been born before Hardon. Carlile died aged 95 on 2 August 2016 in a Sydney hospital after a short illness.

== See also ==
- List of members of the International Swimming Hall of Fame
- Australian Olympic medalists in swimming
