= Katsuki Ishihara =

Japanese swimmer (born 1939)

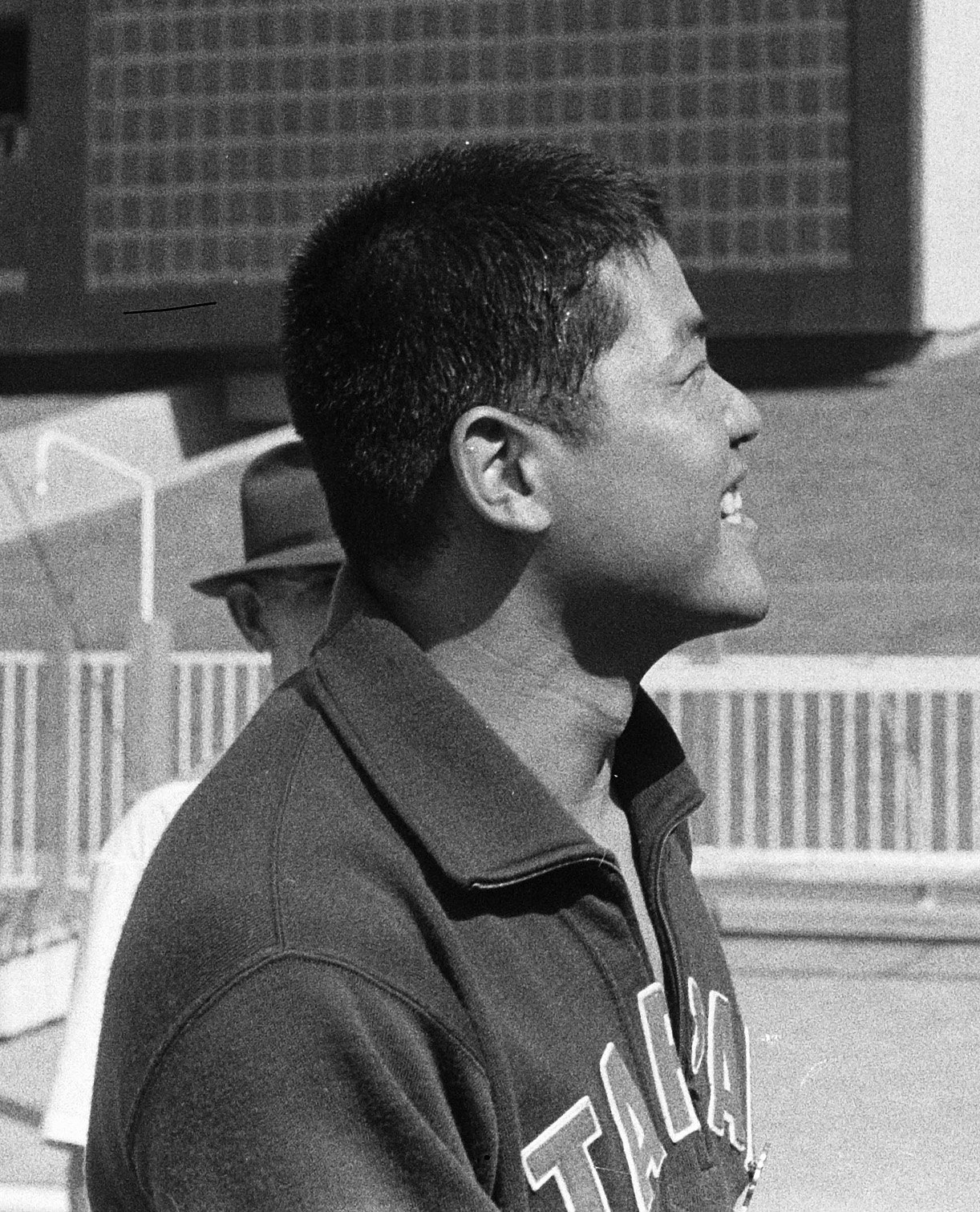
- Ishihara in 1960

Personal information
- Born: March 10, 1939 (age 87) Kumamoto, Japan
- Height: 1.66 m (5 ft 5 in)
- Weight: 66 kg (146 lb)

Sport
- Sport: Swimming
Medal record
Representing Japan
Olympic Games
Bronze medal – third place	1960 Rome	4×100 m medley

Katsuki Ishihara (石原 勝記, Ishihara Katsuki; born March 10, 1939) is a retired Japanese freestyle swimmer who competed at the 1960 and 1964 Summer Olympics. In 1960, he won a bronze medal in the 4 × 100 m medley relay, by swimming for the Japanese team in the preliminary round. In 1964, his 4 × 100 m freestyle relay team finished in fourth place.
