= Lance Larson =

American swimmer (1940–2024)

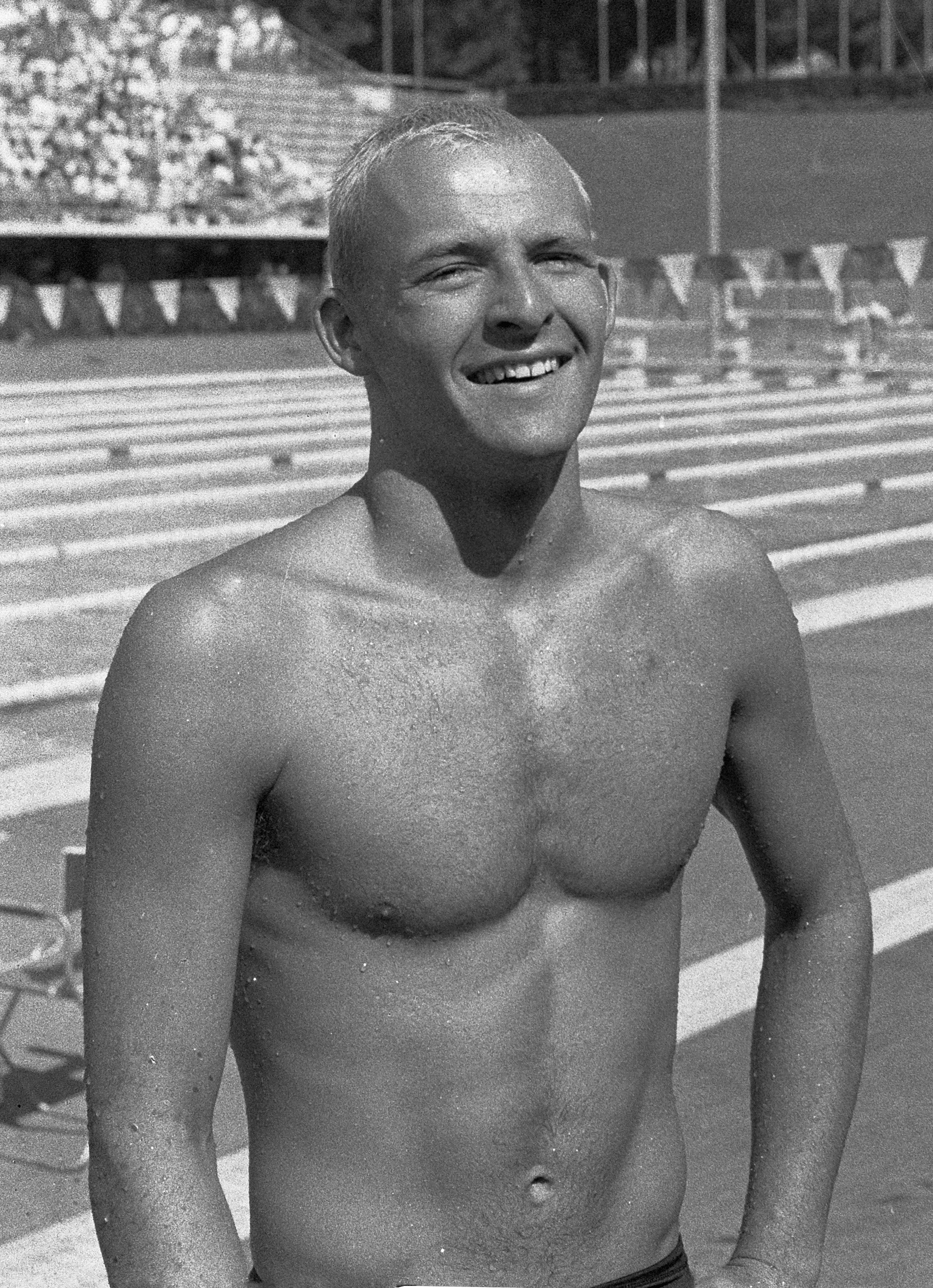
- Larson during the 1960 Olympics.

Personal information
- Full name: Lance Melvin Larson
- National team: United States
- Born: July 3, 1940 Monterey Park, California, U.S.
- Died: January 19, 2024 (aged 83) Orange, California, U.S.
- Height: 6 ft 1 in (1.85 m)
- Weight: 174 lb (79 kg)

Sport
- Sport: Swimming
- Strokes: Butterfly, freestyle, individual medley
- Club: Los Angeles Athletic Club
- College team: University of Southern California
Medal record
Men's swimming
Representing the United States
Olympic Games
Gold medal – first place	1960 Rome	4x100 m medley
Silver medal – second place	1960 Rome	100 m freestyle
Representing USC
NCAA
Gold medal – first place	1960 University Park	Team title
Gold medal – first place	1960 University Park	200 yard individual medley
Gold medal – first place	1960 University Park	400 yard freestyle relay

Lance Melvin Larson (July 3, 1940 – January 19, 2024) was an American competition swimmer, Olympic champion, and world record-holder in four events.

== Early years ==
Lance Melvin Larson was born in Monterey Park, California, and attended El Monte High School. Larson's parents, Walter and Virginia Larson, were owners and operators of a dairy farm and later, a service station. Larson set CIFSS (California Interscholastic Federation-Southern Section) records in 1957 and 1958 in the 100-yards butterfly of 55.5 and 54.6 seconds, and another CIFSS record in 1958 in the 100-yard freestyle of 50.9 seconds. He was the first high school swimmer to break the 50-second barrier in the 100-yard freestyle. Larson was the first man in the world to swim the 100-meter butterfly in under sixty seconds. He enrolled in the University of Southern California, where he swam for the USC Trojans swimming and diving team in National Collegiate Athletic Association (NCAA) competition. He was an "all-around" swimmer in the four-stroke individual medley, the butterfly, and the sprint freestyle, and he won Amateur Athletic Union (AAU) national championships in all three.

== Olympics ==
Larson competed at the 1960 Summer Olympics in Rome, Italy, where he received a gold medal for swimming the butterfly leg of the men's 4×100-meter medley relay for the winning U.S. team. The U.S. relay team of Frank McKinney (backstroke), Paul Hait (breaststroke), Larson (butterfly), and Jeff Farrell (freestyle) set a new world record of 4:05.4 in the event final.

Individually, Larson also won a silver medal in the men's 100-meter freestyle at the 1960 Olympics, and he was a participant in one of the most controversial Olympic swimming finishes ever. John Devitt of Australia was listed as the winner of the men's 100-meter freestyle race. Results were decided by finish judges who relied on their eyes and did not use replays. Three judges were assigned to each finishing position. There were three official timers in 1960 for each lane and swimmer, all timing by hand. All three timers for Devitt, in lane three, timed him in 55.2 seconds. The three timers for lane four timed Lance Larson in 55.0, 55.1, and 55.1 seconds.

Former Olympic swimmer and FINA co-founder Max Ritter inspected the judge's scorecards. Two of the three first-place judges found that Devitt had finished first and the third found for Larson. Of the three-second-place judges, two found that Devitt finished second and one found that Larson was second. Ritter pointed out to chief judge Hans Runströmer of West Germany that the scorecards indicated a tie. Runströmer cast the deciding vote and declared Devitt the winner. Runstromer later claimed that he had a clear view of the finish line, but photos of him showed that he was 25 yards away and could only see the finish line at an angle. As a result, officials placed Devitt first and Larson second, both with the identical time of 55.2 seconds. The United States team appealed, bolstered by videotaped footage of the finish that appeared to show Larson the winner. The appeal jury, headed by Jan de Vries, also the President of FINA in 1960, rejected the appeal, keeping Devitt the winner. This controversy would pave the way for electronic touchpads to be included in swimming events to determine finish and accurate timing.

Larson broke the 100-meter butterfly world record twice in 1960: first, setting the new record of 59.0 seconds on June 29, 1960; and again, a new record of 58.7 seconds on July 24, 1960.

== Life after swimming ==
After the Olympics, Larson continued his studies of business and commerce at the University of Southern California. He then was accepted into the University of the Pacific's dental program, graduating in 1964. Following his graduation, Larson served in the Navy Dental Corps from 1965 to 1968. After completing his service time, he started his own career in general dentistry.

Larson was formerly married to Betty Lee Puttler (1940–2007) of Newport Beach, California; they raised four sons, Lance Jr., Greg, Gary, and Randy, all of who attended and were members of the University of Southern California Swim & Dive program. Following his divorce to Betty Lee, he married Sherri (Powell) Larson in the late 1990s, and adopted her two daughters. Larson retired to Southern California's desert community in 2014 after owning and operating a dentistry practice in Orange, California since 1979. He was a member of the BPOE Garden Grove Elks #1952.

Larson was inducted into the International Swimming Hall of Fame as an "Honor Swimmer" in 1980.

Larson died in Orange, California on January 19, 2024 following complications from pneumonia, at the age of 83.

At the time of his death, he was survived by his wife Sherri, four sons: Lance Jr., Greg, Gary and Randy; two daughters: Jairica Fosburg and Danica Juliano; three stepdaughters: Erica Leon, Jessica Sherwood, and Monica Jara; and 10 grandchildren.

== See also ==
- List of Olympic medalists in swimming (men)
- List of University of Southern California people
- World record progression 100 metres butterfly
- World record progression 200 metres individual medley
- World record progression 4 × 100 metres freestyle relay
- World record progression 4 × 100 metres medley relay

== Bibliography ==
- Maraniss, David, Rome 1960: The Olympics That Changed the World, Simon & Schuster, New York City (2008). ISBN 1-4165-3407-5.

Records
Preceded by Gary Heinrich	Men's 200-meter individual medley world record-holder (long course); July 11, 1959 – July 23, 1960	Succeeded by John McGill
Preceded by Takashi Ishimoto	Men's 100-meter butterfly world record-holder (long course); June 29, 1960 – August 20, 1961	Succeeded by Fred Schmidt
