= Tom Winters =

American former competition swimmer (born 1939)

Thomas Winters
Personal information
- Full name: Frank Thomas Winters
- Nickname: "Tom"
- National team: United States
- Born: October 15, 1939 (age 86) Bay Shore, New York
- Height: 5 ft 10 in (178 cm)
- Weight: 154 lb (70 kg)

Sport
- Sport: Swimming
- Strokes: Freestyle
- Club: Los Angeles Athletic Club
Medal record
Representing USC
NCAA
Gold medal – first place	1960 University Park	Team title
Gold medal – first place	1960 University Park	220 yard freestyle

Frank Thomas Winters (born October 15, 1939) is an American former competition swimmer who represented the United States at the 1960 Summer Olympics in Rome. He swam for the gold medal-winning U.S. team in the preliminary heats of the men's 4×200-meter freestyle relay. However, Winters did not receive a medal because only relay swimmers who competed in the event final were eligible under the 1960 Olympic rules.
