= Koichi Hirakida =

Japanese swimmer (1938–1993)

Personal information
- Born: May 7, 1938
- Died: September 23, 1993 (aged 55)

Sport
- Sport: Swimming
Medal record
Representing Japan
Olympic Games
Bronze medal – third place	1960 Rome	4 x 100 metre medley relay
Asian Games
Silver medal – second place	1958 Tokyo	200m butterfly

Koichi Hirakida (開田 幸一, Hirakida Kōichi) (7 May 1938 – 23 September 1993) was a Japanese butterfly swimmer and Olympic medalist. He participated at the 1960 Summer Olympics in Rome, winning a bronze medal in 4 x 100 metre medley relay.
