= Neville Hayes =

Australian swimmer (1943–2022)

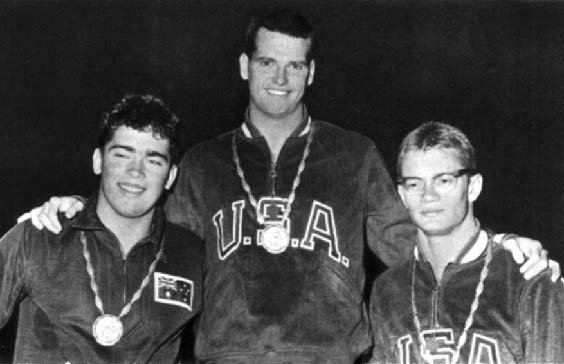
- Hayes (left) at the 1960 Olympics

Personal information
- Full name: Neville Ronald Hayes
- National team: Australia
- Born: 2 December 1943 Hurstville, New South Wales
- Died: 28 June 2022 (aged 78)
- Height: 1.83 m (6 ft 0 in)
- Weight: 80 kg (176 lb)

Sport
- Sport: Swimming
- Strokes: Butterfly
- College team: Harvard University
Medal record
Representing Australia
Olympic Games
Silver medal – second place	1960 Rome	200 m butterfly
Silver medal – second place	1960 Rome	4×100 m medley relay
British Empire and Commonwealth Games
Silver medal – second place	1962 Perth	Men's 110 yd butterfly
Silver medal – second place	1962 Perth	Men's 220 yd butterfly

Neville Ronald Hayes (2 December 1943 – 28 June 2022) was an Australian butterfly swimmer of the 1960s, who won two silver medals at the 1960 Summer Olympics in Rome, in the 200-metre butterfly and the 4×100-metre medley relay.

Hayes set world records in both the 110-yard and 220-yard butterfly in the lead-up to the 1960 Games. However, the 100-metre butterfly was not contested as an individual event in that era. Hayes was aiming for success in the 200-metre butterfly, but came up against the United States' Michael Troy. Although Hayes improved his personal best by three seconds in the final, Troy was a further two seconds ahead, and broke his own world record. Hayes claimed the silver, with fellow Australian Kevin Berry in sixth place. Hayes then combined with David Theile, Terry Gathercole and Geoff Shipton to claim a silver medal in the 4×100-metre medley relay, the first time the event was held at the Olympics, again behind the American team.

In 1962, Hayes was usurped as Australia's leading butterfly swimmer when Berry defeated him at a dual meet between Australia and Japan. Later that year at the 1962 British Empire and Commonwealth Games in Perth, Western Australia, Berry defeated Hayes into silver the 100-metre butterfly by almost three seconds. Berry repeated the result in the 200-metre event, beating Hayes by 5.5 seconds.

He graduated from Harvard University with Bachelor of Arts in 1967, and from Harvard Business School with an MBA in 1969. While attending Harvard as an undergraduate, he swam for the Harvard Crimson swimming and diving team from 1964 to 1967, and received All-American honours in his signature event, the 200-yard butterfly.

== See also ==
- List of Commonwealth Games medallists in swimming (men)
- List of Olympic medalists in swimming (men)
