= Yoshihiko Osaki =

Japanese swimmer (1939–2015)

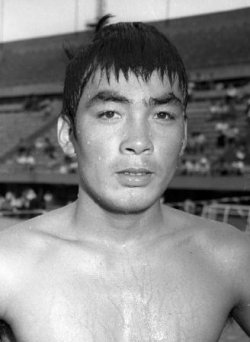

Personal information
- Born: February 27, 1939 Ishikawa Prefecture, Empire of Japan
- Died: April 28, 2015 (aged 76) Osaka, Japan
- Education: Waseda University
- Height: 1.76 m (5 ft 9 in)
- Weight: 68 kg (150 lb)

Sport
- Sport: Swimming
Medal record
Representing Japan
Olympic Games
Silver medal – second place	1960 Rome	200 m breaststroke
Bronze medal – third place	1960 Rome	4×100 m medley

Yoshihiko Osaki (大崎 剛彦, Ōsaki Yoshihiko; February 27, 1939 – April 28, 2015) was a Japanese swimmer. He competed at the 1960 Summer Olympics and won a silver medal in the 200 metre breaststroke and a bronze medal in the 4 × 100 m medley relay.

In 1984, Osaki helped establish the Japan Masters Swimming Association and served on its board until his death. During those years he popularized masters swimming both in Japan and internationally. In 1986, he organized the first FINA World masters championships in Tokyo, and since 1993 participated in every international masters competition. He had competed in five age groups, set 9 world masters records and won 7 world titles. In 2006 he was inducted into the International Swimming Hall of Fame in the Contributors category.

Osaki died of interstitial pneumonia, aged 76. He was survived by two daughters, a son, and wife Yoshiko Sato, a fellow masters and Olympic swimmer.
