= Kazuo Tomita =

Japanese swimmer (born 1939)

Personal information
- Born: 1939 (age 86–87)

Sport
- Sport: Swimming
Medal record
Representing Japan
Olympic Games
Bronze medal – third place	1960 Rome	4x100m medley relay
Asian Games
Gold medal – first place	1958 Tokyo	200m backstroke
Gold medal – first place	1962 Jakarta	100m backstroke
Gold medal – first place	1962 Jakarta	4x100m medley relay
Silver medal – second place	1962 Jakarta	200m backstroke

Kazuo Tomita (富田 一雄, Tomita Kazuo) (born 1939) is a Japanese swimmer and Olympic medalist. He participated at the 1960 Summer Olympics in Rome, winning a bronze medal in 4 × 100 metre medley relay. He also previously participated at the 1956 Summer Olympics in Melbourne.
