= Bob Bennett (swimmer) =

American swimmer (born 1943)

Robert Bennett
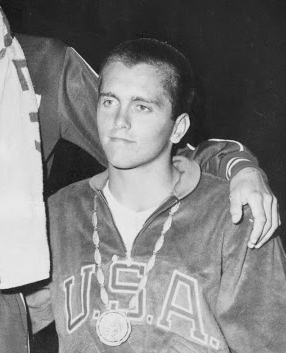
- Bennett at the 1960 Olympics

Personal information
- Full name: Robert Earl Bennett
- Nickname: "Bob"
- National team: United States
- Born: May 23, 1943 (age 83) Los Angeles, California, U.S.
- Height: 6 ft 0 in (1.83 m)
- Weight: 172 lb (78 kg)

Sport
- Sport: Swimming
- Strokes: Backstroke
- Club: Los Angeles Athletic Club
- College team: University of Southern California
- Coach: Peter Daland (USC)
Medal record
Representing the United States
Olympic Games
Bronze medal – third place	1960 Rome	100 m backstroke
Bronze medal – third place	1964 Tokyo	200 m backstroke

Robert Earl Bennett (born May 23, 1943) is an American former competition swimmer, Olympic medalist, and former world record-holder.

Bennett attended the University of Southern California (USC), where he competed for the USC Trojans swimming and diving team from 1963 to 1965. He received All-American honors for three consecutive years, and graduated in 1965.

Bennett represented the United States at the 1960 and 1964 Summer Olympics. At the 1960 Rome games, he received a bronze medal for his third-place result in the men's 100-meter backstroke, finishing in 1:02.3 – a fraction of a second behind Australian David Theile (1:01.9) and fellow American Frank McKinney (1:02.1). He also swam for the gold medal-winning U.S. team in the heats of the 4×100-meter medley relay, setting a new world record of 4:08.2 in the process. He did not receive a medal, however, because he did not swim in the event final, and was not medal-eligible under the 1964 Olympic swimming rules.

Four years later at the 1964 Tokyo games, he won a second bronze medal in the men's 200-meter backstroke (2:13.1). He again swam for the first-place U.S. team in the preliminary heats of the 4×100-meter medley relay, but was again ineligible to receive a medal.

Bennett set a new world record of 1.01.3 in the 100-meter backstroke on August 19, 1961; the record survived for twelve months until broken by American Tom Stock.

== See also ==
- List of Olympic medalists in swimming (men)
- List of University of Southern California people
- World record progression 100 metres backstroke
- World record progression 4 × 100 metres medley relay
