= Geoff Shipton =

Australian swimmer

Personal information
- Full name: Geoffrey Lloyd Shipton
- Nickname: "Geoff"
- National team: Australia
- Born: 4 June 1941 (age 85) Sydney, New South Wales
- Height: 1.85 m (6 ft 1 in)
- Weight: 73 kg (161 lb)

Sport
- Sport: Swimming
- Strokes: Freestyle
Medal record
Men's swimming
Representing Australia
Olympic Games
Silver medal – second place	1960 Rome	4×100 m medley relay
British Empire and Commonwealth Games
Bronze medal – third place	1958 Cardiff	110 yd freestyle

Geoffrey Lloyd Shipton (born 4 June 1941) is an Australian former sprint freestyle swimmer of the 1950s and 1960s, who won a silver medal in the 4×100-metre medley relay at the 1960 Summer Olympics in Rome.

The New South Welshman combined with David Theile, Neville Hayes and Terry Gathercole to win silver in the 4×100-metre medley relay, behind the United States and in front of Japanese team by just 0.2 of a second, the first time this event had been contested at the Olympics. Shipton had previously won a bronze medal in the 110-yard freestyle at the 1958 British Empire and Commonwealth Games in Cardiff, Wales, behind fellow Australians John Devitt and Gary Chapman.

== See also ==
- List of Commonwealth Games medallists in swimming (men)
- List of Olympic medalists in swimming (men)
- World record progression 4 × 100 metres freestyle relay
