= Terry Gathercole =

Australian swimmer

Terry Gathercole AM
Personal information
- Full name: Terrence Stephen Gathercole
- National team: Australia
- Born: 25 November 1935 Tallimba, New South Wales
- Died: 30 May 2001 (aged 65) Canberra, Australian Capital Territory
- Height: 1.77 m (5 ft 10 in)
- Weight: 76 kg (168 lb)

Sport
- Sport: Swimming
- Strokes: Breaststroke
Medal record
Men's swimming
Representing Australia
Olympic Games
Silver medal – second place	1960 Rome	4×100 m medley
British Empire and Commonwealth Games
Gold medal – first place	1958 Cardiff	220 yd breaststroke
Gold medal – first place	1958 Cardiff	4×110 yd medley

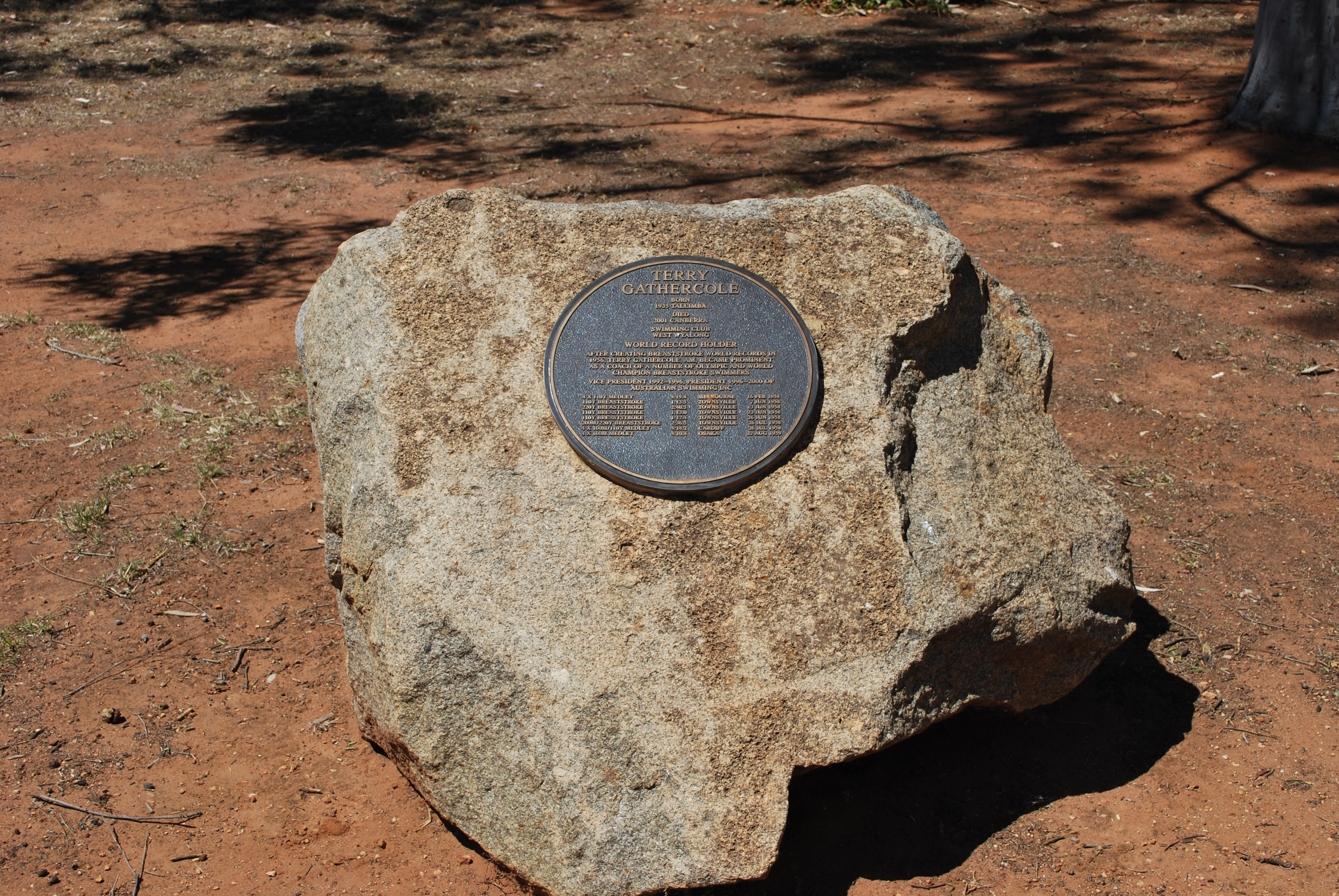
Monument to Gathercole at Tallimba

Terrence Stephen Gathercole AM (25 November 1935 – 30 May 2001), was an Australian breaststroke swimmer of the 1950s and 1960s, who won a silver medal in the 4×100-metre medley relay at the 1960 Summer Olympics. He later became a swimming coach, at one stage being the Australian female team coach for the 1964 Summer Olympics and guiding numerous breaststroke students to Olympic and World Championship gold medals. He also served as the president of Swimming Australia.

== Biography ==
Born in Tallimba, New South Wales. He grew up in West Wyalong, New South Wales where he lived throughout his school years. In 1957, he married Carol Fraser and they had three children – Gai, Ben and Tim. He died in 2001 because of heart problems, an illness which he had carried for 15 years after requiring open-heart surgery. A public memorial service at the Australian Institute of Sport in Canberra, where he coached, was attended by Prime Minister John Howard and several federal cabinet ministers.

== Swimming career ==
Gathercole swam for the West Wyalong Swimming Club and received coaching advice through the mail from Forbes Carlile. Gathercole first came to prominence in the 1954 Australian Championships, when he won the first of his ten Australian Championships. He made his international debut at the 1956 Summer Olympics in Melbourne, contesting the 200-metre breaststroke, at the first Olympics in which the butterfly stroke was separated from breaststroke swimming. He finished fourth in the final, just 0.1 of a second behind the bronze medalist Charis Yunichev of the Soviet Union. He was coached by Forbes Carlile after moving to Sydney.

Gathercole reached the peak of his swimming career in 1958 when he set the world record for the 200-metre breaststroke at the Tobruk Pool in Townsville, Queensland. He held this world record for over three years. In the 1958 British Empire and Commonwealth Games in Cardiff, Wales, he won the 220-yard breaststroke and combined with John Monckton, John Devitt and Brian Wilkinson to claim the 4×110-yard medley relay.

Gathercole's final appearance on the international arena as a swimmer was at the 1960 Summer Olympics in Rome, where he won his semifinal of the 200-metre breaststroke. However, in the final he only managed sixth, almost three seconds behind Bill Mulliken of the United States. Gathercole then combined with David Theile, Neville Hayes and Geoff Shipton to claim silver in the 4 × 100 m medley relay, again behind the Americans. Gathercole had at various times in his career held the world record in the 200-metre, and national records in the 110- and 220-yard breaststroke.

== Coaching career ==
Gathercole then became a coach, beginning as an assistant to Forbes Carlile. In December 1960, he became a full-time professional coach and built an indoor short course pool in Castle Cove, New South Wales, a northern suburb of Sydney. At the 1964 Summer Olympics in Tokyo, the Australian Olympic Federation agreed to appoint team coaches for the first time. By 1966 Gathercole gained the contract as Head Coach at Victoria Park Swimming Pool in Sydney, which he held until 1969, when it was handed over to John Gregory. Victoria Park was the home pool for Newtown Amateur Swimming Club, which ranked highly amongst other clubs of that era. Gathercole was named as the national women's coach. Among the breaststrokers that Gathercole coached were Ian O'Brien (1964 Summer Olympics 200-metre breaststroke champion) and Beverley Whitfield (1972 Summer Olympics 200-metre breaststroke champion) and backstroker and Lisa Forrest (dual gold medallist at the 1982 Commonwealth Games). In 1986, Gathercole was appointed as a Senior Coach with the Australian Institute of Sport's swimming program. Whilst at the AIS, he coached Linley Frame (1991 World Aquatics Championships 100-metre breaststroke champion) and Phil Rogers (1992 Summer Olympics 100-metre breaststroke bronze medallist). In 1992, he retired from the AIS due to heath concerns. He served as a coach for the national team for 28 years until his retirement in 1992.

Major national team coaching appointments:

- Olympic Games – 1964 Rome, 1976 Montreal, and 1992 Barcelona
- World Long Course Championships – 1975 Columbia and 1991 Perth
- Commonwealth Games – 1966 Kingston

== Administration career ==
He was elected vice president of Australian Swimming from 1992 to 1996 and president from 1997–2000.

== Recognition ==
- 1981– Australian Coach of the Year
- 1985 – Inducted into the International Swimming Hall of Fame as an "Honor Swimmer".
- 1987 – Life member of the Australian Swim Coaches Association
- 1987 – Master Coach by the Australian Swim Coaches Association
- 1988 – Member of the Order of Australia (AM) in recognition of service to the sport of swimming.
- 1991 – Australian Coaching Council's Individual Coach of the Year.
- 1999 – inducted into Sport Australia Hall of Fame

== See also ==
- List of members of the International Swimming Hall of Fame
- List of Commonwealth Games medallists in swimming (men)
- List of Olympic medalists in swimming (men)
- World record progression 200 metres breaststroke
