= Mike Troy =

American swimmer (1940–2019)

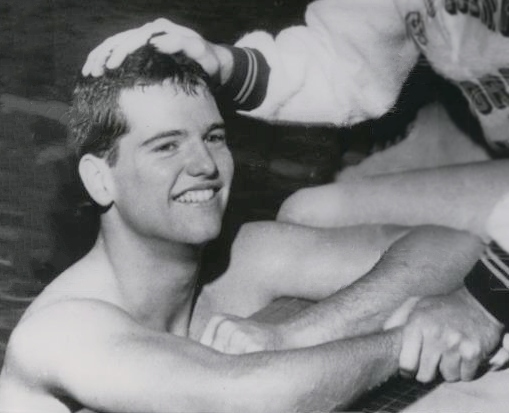
- Troy in 1960

Personal information
- Full name: Michael Francis Troy
- National team: United States
- Born: October 3, 1940 Indianapolis, Indiana, U.S.
- Died: August 3, 2019 (aged 78) Arizona, U.S.
- Height: 6 ft 1 in (1.85 m)
- Weight: 170 lb (77 kg)

Sport
- Sport: Swimming
- Strokes: Butterfly, freestyle
- Club: Indianapolis Athletic Club
- College team: Indiana University (IU)
- Coach: James "Doc" Counsilman (IU)
Medal record
Representing the United States
Olympic Games
| Gold medal – first place | 1960 Rome | 200 m butterfly |
| Gold medal – first place | 1960 Rome | 4×200 m freestyle |
Pan American Games
| Gold medal – first place | 1959 Chicago | 4×100 m medley |
| Silver medal – second place | 1959 Chicago | 200 m butterfly |
Representing Indiana
NCAA
| Gold medal – first place | 1960 University Park | 100 yard butterfly |
| Gold medal – first place | 1960 University Park | 200 yard butterfly |
| Gold medal – first place | 1960 University Park | 400 yard medley relay |

Michael Francis Troy (October 3, 1940 – August 3, 2019) was an American competitive swimmer, a two-time Olympic champion, and world record-holder in three events.

The peak of Troy's swimming career occurred between 1959 and 1960 while he was coached by Doc Counsilman of the Indiana Hoosiers swimming and diving team at Indiana University. At the 1960 Summer Olympics in Rome, he won his first gold medal as a member of the winning U.S. team in the men's 4×200-meter freestyle relay. Individually, he won a second gold with his first-place finish in the men's 200-meter butterfly—his signature event.

Troy broke the world record in the 200-meter butterfly six consecutive times before it was taken over by fellow American swimmer Carl Robie in 1961. In 1971 he was inducted into the International Swimming Hall of Fame.

After college, Troy entered active duty with the United States Navy on February 15, 1964, and completed Officer Candidate School. Troy was commissioned as an Ensign and volunteered for Underwater Demolition Training, now known as Basic Underwater Demolition/SEAL (BUD/S) training. After months of grueling training, Troy graduated with BUD/S class 33 in December 1964. Troy received assignment to Underwater Demolition Team ELEVEN (UDT-11) and later deployed with his team to South Vietnam in 1966. He was recommended for the numerous awards for his combat service during the Vietnam War. Troy resigned from active duty on February 28, 1969.

After leaving military service Troy settled in the San Diego area where he worked as a real estate agent and swimming coach. His trainees included Mike Stamm. At the time of his death in 2019 Troy was co-owner of the Gold Medal Swim School in Chandler, Arizona, with two time Olympic coach Mike Walker. Troy served as Chairman of the International Section of the Olympic Committee and Vice President of the American Swimming Coaches Association. Troy was the National Director of the USA Paralympic Swimming Team. He accompanied the team to Athens, Greece in September 2004 where the U.S. Paralympic team won numerous medals.

Troy died on August 3, 2019, in Arizona at the age of 78.

== See also ==
- List of members of the International Swimming Hall of Fame
- List of Indiana University (Bloomington) people
- List of Olympic medalists in swimming (men)
- World record progression 200 metres butterfly
- World record progression 4 × 100 metres medley relay
- World record progression 4 × 200 metres freestyle relay

Records
| Preceded by William Yorzyk | Men's 200-meter butterfly world record-holder (long course); July 11, 1959 – August 19, 1961 | Succeeded by Carl Robie |
