= Frank McKinney =

American swimmer, Olympic gold medalist, former world record-holder, bank executive

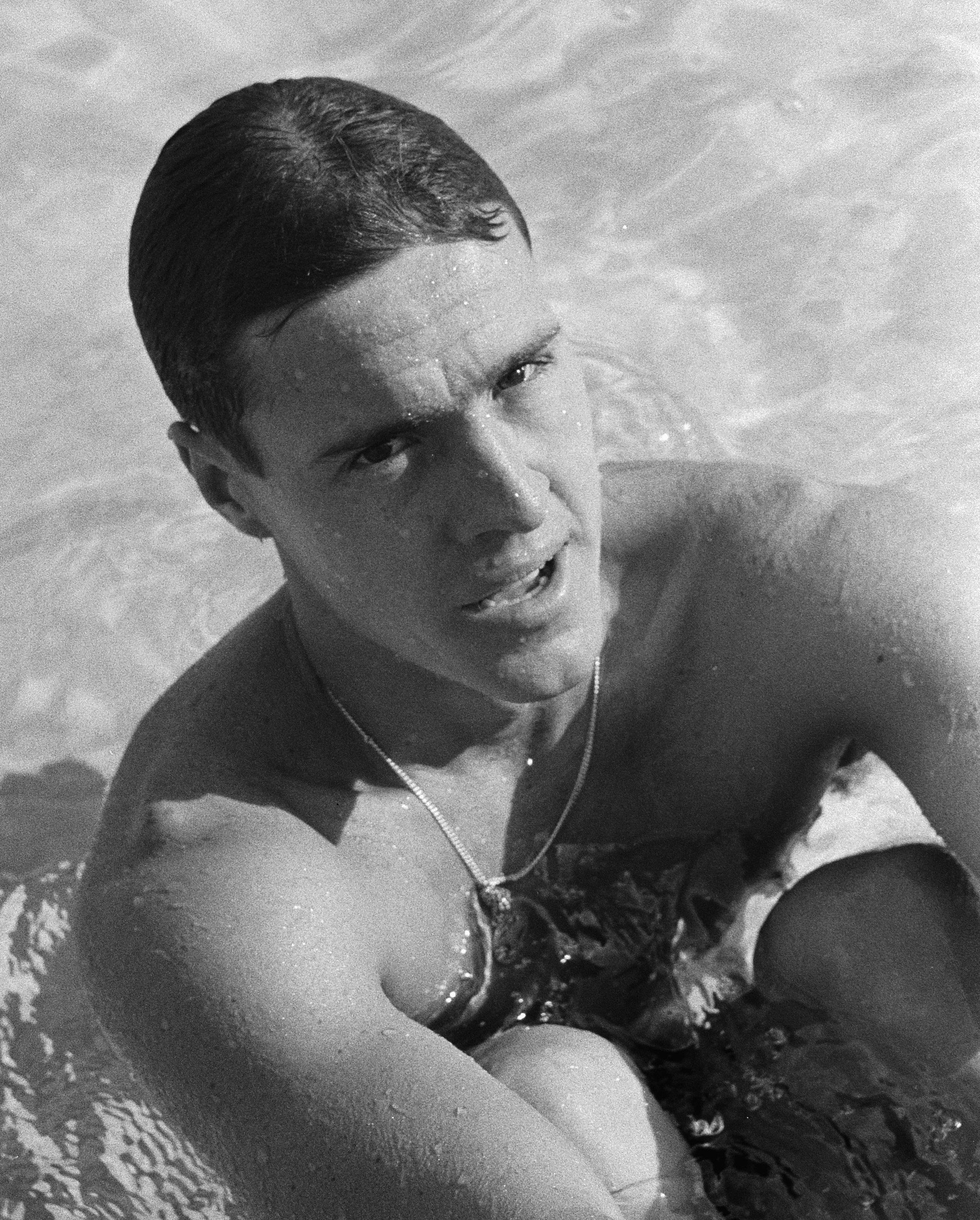
- McKinney positioned for a backstroke start at the 1960 Olympics

Personal information
- Full name: Frank Edward McKinney Jr.
- National team: United States
- Born: November 3, 1938 Indianapolis, Indiana, U.S.
- Died: September 11, 1992 (aged 53) Indianapolis, Indiana, U.S.
- Occupation: Bank Executive
- Height: 6 ft 0 in (1.83 m)
- Weight: 163 lb (74 kg)
- Spouses: Katherine Berry McKinney (1962); Marianne Williams McKinney ('89)
- Children: 4 daughters, 2 sons (K. Berry)

Sport
- Sport: Swimming
- Events: 100, 200 backstroke, Medley Relay
- Strokes: Backstroke
- Club: Indianapolis Athletic Club (IAC)
- College team: Indiana University
- Coach: James C. W. Clark (IAC); James Counsilman (Indiana)
Medal record
Men's swimming
Representing the United States
Olympic Games
Gold medal – first place	1960 Rome	4×100 m medley
Silver medal – second place	1960 Rome	100 m backstroke
Bronze medal – third place	1956 Melbourne	100 m backstroke
Pan American Games
Gold medal – first place	1955 Mexico City	100 m back
Gold medal – first place	1955 Mexico City	4×100 m medley
Gold medal – first place	1959 Chicago	100 m back
Gold medal – first place	1959 Chicago	4×100 m medley
Representing Indiana
NCAA
Gold medal – first place	1959 Ithaca	100 yard backstroke
Gold medal – first place	1959 Ithaca	200 yard backstroke
Gold medal – first place	1960 University Park	400 yard medley relay

Frank Edward McKinney Jr. (November 3, 1938 – September 11, 1992) was an American competition swimmer, Olympic champion, and world record-holder who competed for Indiana University. In July, 1959, he set a new world record for the 200-meter backstroke of 2:17.9. He won a bronze medal in the 100-meter backstroke at the Melbourne Olympics in 1956. At the 1960 Rome Olympics, he won a silver medal in the 100-meter backstroke, then earned his only Olympic gold medal swimming the backstroke leg in the 4x100 meter medley relay that set a world record time of 4:05.4. Graduating Indiana with an MBA in 1962, he married, served in the U.S. Army, and became a prominent executive in the American banking industry. Taking his first position in banking in Chicago in 1964, he started work at American Fletcher National Bank of Indianapolis in 1968 as an Assistant to the Vice President. After ascending to the role of President and CEO of American Fletcher National, he simultaneously assumed the role of President and CEO of Bank One when it purchased American Fletcher National in a merger in 1986. Retiring from the banking industry in 1990 to focus on his community service roles, he died prematurely near Indianapolis in 1992 in a mid-air collision of two aircraft.

== Early life and swimming ==
McKinney was born one of four siblings on November 3, 1938, in Indianapolis, to father Frank E. McKinney Sr. and mother Margaret Warner McKinney, a civic leader. He attended Indianapolis's Cathedral High School, graduating in 1957. His father Frank E. McKinney Sr., was the founder of American Fletcher National Bank, a former chairman of the Democratic National Committee during the reign of Harry Truman, and a former owner of the National League's Pittsburgh Pirates from around 1947–1951.

Though he had formerly also played football, Frank McKinney switched to swimming in High School. He trained and competed with the Indianapolis Athletic Club where he was coached by James Cass Williamson Clark throughout his High School years. A committed swim athlete while at Cathedral High, McKinney would sometimes train as much as three times a day, with an early morning practice before school and one after school nearly every day. McKinney's Coach Clark had formerly competed and coached swimming at Indiana's Butler University, and during WWII coached swimming at the Great Lakes Naval Station. A strong regional program under Clark, the Indianapolis Athletic Club team handily won the American Red Cross Indianapolis Swimming Championship in early September 1951. At the 1951 Indianapolis championship, McKinney improved on his 50-meter backstroke time by two seconds, resetting his own record for boys 12 and under.

== Pan Am Games ==
McKinney was the youngest member of a U.S. national swim team which set a world record in the 4×100-meter medley relay at the March, 1955 Pan American Games in Mexico City. The 16-year-old Cathedral High School student also won a gold medal in the 100-meter backstroke. He won two more golds in the same events at the 1959 Pan American Games in late August through early September in Chicago.

=== Swimming legacy ===
McKinney's swimming style helped introduce and popularize modern backstroke techniques. An admirer of Yoshi Oyakawa as America's top backstroker, McKinney used the modern bent-arm backstroke, even as Oyakawa had used the straight-arm stroke. The bent arm technique provided greater speed, propulsion, and allowed for a greater degree of body rotation and an increased number of strokes per lap. McKinney was one of several young swimmers who won the U.S. Nationals for the Indianapolis Athletic Club that included Mike Troy, Bill Cass, Bill Barton, and Alan Somers. Later, as noted below, they would all swim for the Indiana Hoosiers swimming and diving team under coach Doc Counsilman at Indiana University. By July 1959, the Indianapolis Athletic Club swim team, with McKinney as backstroker, had won three consecutive team titles at the National AAU Men's Outdoor Swimming Championships. At the July, 1959 National Outdoor Swimming championship in Los Altos, California, McKinney defended his two national backstroke titles, and set a new World Record in the 200-meter backstroke with a time of 2:17.9.

== 1956 Melbourne Olympics ==
At the age of 17, at the 1956 Melbourne Olympics, where he was trained and managed by Head Olympic Coach Bob Muir, coach of Williams College. McKinney captured a bronze medal in the men's 100-meter backstroke. He won the bronze in a close finish in the finals with a time of 1:04.5. David Theile and John Monckton of the Australian team won the gold and silver respectively with times of 1:02.2, and 1:03.2. Australia had dominated the Olympic freestyle events, but performed less well in stroke competition with the exception of this backstroke event. After the 1956 Olympics, McKinney entered Indiana University.

== 1960 Rome Olympics ==
At the 1960 Summer Olympics in Rome, Italy, coached by Head Olympic Coach Gus Stager of Michigan University, McKinney received a silver medal for his second-place finish in the men's 100-meter backstroke with a time of 1:02.1. As in the 1956 Olympics, he was outpaced by the event's former world record holder Australia's David Theile who won the gold with a time of 1:01.9. In a very close finish, Bob Bennet of the U.S. team touched just behind McKinney taking the bronze with a time of 1:02.3. McKinney also won a gold medal by swimming the lead-off backstroke leg for the first-place U.S. team in the men's 4×100-meter medley relay. The U.S. 4x100 meter medley relay team had been highly favored before the game, and won with a combined World record time of 4:05.4, a full seven seconds ahead of the second-place Australian team.

== Indiana University ==
McKinney earned his B.S. in June, 1961 and a Master of Business Administration in 1962 from Indiana University, where as an undergraduate he swam for Hall of Fame Coach James Counsilman who began his coaching career at Indiana in 1957, shortly after McKinney enrolled. In his Senior year in High School, McKinney Jr. encouraged Counsilman to apply for the position of Indiana's Head Swim coach, as Frank McKinney Sr. chaired Indiana's Board of Trustees at the time. McKinney was a member of the Sigma Alpha Epsilon fraternity, and was active in University student administration, serving as President of the Indiana University Foundation Steering Committee. In his future careers, in addition to his primary position as a banking executive, he would continue to place himself in roles that served the community. McKinney competed with Indiana's swim team from 1959 to 1961, where he won Big Ten Conference titles eight times. He captained the team, and in 1961 helped lead it to its first Big Ten Conference title. He captured five American Athletic Union titles, largely during his time competing with Indiana. He took NCAA swimming titles in Ithica, New York in 1959 in the 100 and 200 yard backstroke events and in 1960 swimming the backstroke leg for Indiana in the 4x100 yard medley relay.

McKinney retired from competition after graduating from Indiana University in 1961, married, served in the army, and went into banking.

=== U.S. Army service ===
In 1962, McKinney served with the United States Army, reaching the rank of First Lieutenant, with an early station in Columbus, Georgia in December. He served through around 1964, working largely in the field of Intelligence.

== Career ==
Perhaps always considering a role in banking from an early age, McKinney first worked for his father's American Fletcher National bank in High School as a cashier at the age of 16. After serving in the Army, McKinney worked for First National Bank of Chicago from 1964 to 1967 where his duties included serving as an Assistant Cashier.

Frank McKinney Jr. returned work in earnest at the American Fletcher National Bank (AFNB) as an Assistant Vice-President around 1968, and ascended to the role of CEO and Chairman by 1973. American Fletcher was largely founded by Frank's father Frank McKinney Senior, after making a sizable fortune in real estate during the Great Depression. During his first 18 years as an executive with AFNB, McKinney helped grow the bank into one of the Indiana's largest. Frank McKinney Jr. became the president, of Bank One of Indiana (previously American Fletcher National Bank), as part of a merger with American Fletcher National in 1986. The merger made him president of the Columbus, Ohio-based parent company, Banc One Corporation, while still the chief executive officer of the Indiana subsidiary American Fletcher National in Indianapolis. In addition to his primary role as a banking executive, McKinney chaired the Association of Bank Holding Companies, and was a corporate board member for the American United Life Insurance Company, and the Indianapolis Power and Light Company. Also active in supporting civic organizations he was on the board of the Symphony Orchestra of Indianapolis, and the National Art Museum of Sports. McKinney continued to swim for fitness during his business career, particularly in his early years, doing laps on his lunch break at the Indianapolis Athletic Club, where he had trained in High School. He retired from his role as a banking executive in 1990.

Serving the swimming community, he helped found the International Swimming Hall of Fame in 1965, and served as its first treasurer.

== Marriages ==
He was married to Katherine Jeanne Berry McKinney on August 18, 1962, at St. Joan of Arc Catholic Church in Indianapolis, remaining married 23 years. The couple had two sons and four daughters. McKinney met Katherine Berry at Indiana, where she was Vice-President of Kappa Gama Sorority and was on the Memorial Union Board of the I.U. Foundation. She taught at a public school in Bloomington at the time of their wedding and was working towards a master's degree. She later worked as a Secretary for Jesuit Preparatory school for nine years, where the couple's four daughters attended school. After working for Jesuit Prep, she plunged into community service and volunteer roles, including serving as the Director of Youthlinks, part of the Indiana Sports Corporation. After raising a large family, Frank McKinney and Jeanne Berry were divorced in 1985. McKinney subsequently married Marianne Williams, a concert pianist, in 1989. McKinney would later help raise a stepson and stepdaughter during his second marriage to Marianne. Marianne attended Orchard County Day School through 1954, majored in History at Radcliffe College, and then received a Doctorate and Masters from the University of Minnesota.

== Honors ==
McKinney was made a member of the International Swimming Hall of Fame in 1985. He was inducted to the Helms Hall of Fame, and the Los Angeles Times voted him the Outstanding U.S. Male Athlete in Aquatics in 1956.

McKinney became a member of the Indiana University Athletics Hall of Fame in 1982, largely for his Olympic and international swimming achievements. Indiana's Butler University granted an honorary Doctor of Law Degree in 1975. He received Indiana's Outstanding Senior Award and the Balfour Award given to outstanding athletes for sportsmanship.

== Death in plane crash ==
On September 11, 1992, McKinney died near Indianapolis at age 53, in a mid-air collision between two aircraft. He was traveling to Columbus, Ohio, with three other civic leaders, who were also killed along with the pilots of both aircraft. A memorial service was held on September 15, at St. Luke Catholic Church, with the Governor of Indiana, Evan Bayh, the Indianapolis Mayor, Stephen Goldsmith, the Indiana University President, Thomas Ehrlich and other local business leaders in attendance. McKinney had served as a campaign manager for one of Bayh's elections, and as an advisor for international trade. He is buried in Crown Hill Cemetery (Section 68, Lot 533) in Indianapolis.

== See also ==
- List of members of the International Swimming Hall of Fame
- List of Indiana University (Bloomington) people
- List of Olympic medalists in swimming (men)
- World record progression 200 metres backstroke
- World record progression 4 × 100 metres medley relay
