= Swimming at the 1958 European Aquatics Championships – Men's 4 × 100 metre medley relay =

Qualifying rounds of Men's 4 × 100 metre medley relay at the 1958 European Aquatics Championships were held on 4th, final was on 6 September. 11 teams competed at the champion.

Soviet Union won the gold medal with a European record. Hungary finished at the 2nd, Italy at the 3rd place.

== Records ==
Before the races:

	Name	Nationality	Result	Location	Date
World record	John Moncton; Terry Gathercole; Brian Wilkinson; John Devitt	(Australia)	4:10,4	Osaka	22 August 1958.
European record	László Magyar; Ferenc Utassy; György Tumpek; Imre Nyéki	(Hungary)	4:18,1	Budapest	5 August 1954.

New records achieved during the competition:

	Championship Section	Name	Result	Location	Date (1958)
European record	Finals	Soviet Union; Leonid Barbier; Vladimir Minachkin; Vitaliy Chenenkov; Viktor Polevoy	4:16,5	Budapest, Hungary	6 September
European Championship record	Qualification	Soviet Union; Leonid Barbier; Vladimir Minachkin; Vitaliy Chenenkov; Viktor Polevoy	4:22,6	Budapest, Hungary	4 September
European Championship record	Qualification	(Italy); Gilberto Elsa; Roberto Lazzari; Federico Dennerlein; Paolo Pucci	4:20,6	Budapest, Hungary	4 September

== Results ==
Here are the meanings of the abbreviations:

- Q: Qualified based on the result
- ECR: European Championship record
- WR: World record
- ER: European record

=== Qualifications ===
Result	Race	Name	Nation	Result	Other
1.	2	Gilberto Elsa (1:06,7); Roberto Lazzari (1:13,1); Federico Dennerlein (1:04,6); Paolo Pucci (56,2)	(Italy)	4:20,6	Q, ECR
2.	2	László Magyar (1:06,0); György Kunsági (1:15,0); György Tumpek (1:03,7); Gyula Dobai (57,0)	(Hungary)	4:21,7	Q
3.	1	Georgij Kuvaldin (1:06,7); Vladimir Minaskin (1:13,8); Leonid Sagajduk (1:05,1); Viktor Polevoj (57,0)	Soviet Union	4:22,6	Q, ECR
4.	2	Dieter Pfeifer (1:06,5); Konrad Enke (1:13,6); Wolfgang Sieber (1:05,9); Horst-Günter Gregor (58,5)	(East Germany)	4:24,5	Q
5.	1	Ladislav Bačík (1:07,8); Vítězslav Svozil (1:12,9); Pavel Pazdírek (1:04,1); Petr Kováč (59,8)	(Czechoslovakia)	4:24,6	Qo
6.	1	Ekkerhard Miersch (1:09,2); Hans Tröger (1:15,0); Horst Weber (1:04,3); Paul Voell (57,7)	(West Germany)	4:26,2	Q
7.	2	Haydn Rigby (1:09,1); Christopher Walkden (1:15,7); Ian Black (1:04,9); Neil McKechnie (59,8)	(United Kingdom)	4:29,5	Q
8.	2	Robert Cristophe (1:04,0); Maurice Lusien (1:19,8); René Pirolley (1:07,8); Marc Kamoeun (59,8)	(France)	4:31,4	Q
9.	2	Friedl Duda; Gerald Brauner; Otto Mayer (1:09,7); Gert Kölli (1:00,4)	(Austria)	4:36,9	
	1		(Poland)		DQ

=== Final ===
Result	Line	Name	Nation	Time	Other
	3	Leonid Barbier (1:04,2); Vladimir Minachkin (1:11,6); Vitaliy Chenenkov (1:02,7); Viktor Polevoy (58,0)	(Soviet Union)	4:16,5	ER
	5	László Magyar (1:06,5); György Kunsági (1:14,5); György Tumpek (1:03,2); Gyula Dobai (56,2)	(Hungary)	4:20,4
	4	Gilberto Elsa (1:07,8); Roberto Lazzari (1:13,5); Federico Dennerlein (1:04,6); Paolo Pucci (56,0)	(Italy)	4:21,9
4.	6	Wolfgang Wagner (1:06,2); Konrad Enke (1:14,8); Wolfgang Sieber (1:04,7); Horst-Günter Gregor (57,6)	(East Germany)	4:23,3
5.	2	Ladislav Bačík (1:07,9); Vítězslav Svozil (1:13,1); Pavel Pazdírek (1:03,0); Petr Kováč (1:00,1)	(Czechoslovakia)	4:24,1
6.	7	Ekkerhard Miersch (1:09,9); Hans Tröger (1:15,1); Horst Weber (1:03,8); Paul Voell (56,3)	(West Germany)	4:25,1
7.	1	Graham Sykes (1:07,2); Christopher Walkden (1:14,6); Graham Symonds (1:05,0); Neil McKechnie (59,9)	(United Kingdom)	4:26,7
8.	8	Robert Cristophe (1:03,2); Maurice Lusien (1:18,8); René Pirolley (1:06,0); Marc Kamoeun (58,8)	(France)	4:26,8

== Sources ==
- IX. úszó, műugró és vízilabda Európa-bajnokság. Magyar Úszó Szövetség. 1958.
