= Swimming at the 1960 Summer Olympics – Men's 200 metre butterfly =

Men's 200 metre butterfly at the Games of the XVII Olympiad
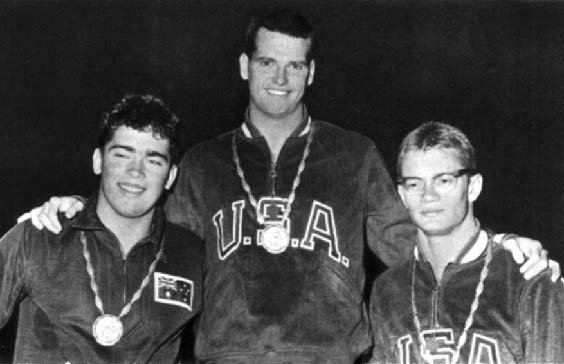
- Left-right: Neville Hayes, Mike Troy and Dave Gillanders at the 1960 Olympics.
- Venue: Stadio Olimpico del Nuoto
- Date: 31 August 1960 (heats); 1 September 1960 (semifinals); 2 September 1960 (final)
- Competitors: 34 from 23 nations
- Winning time: 2:12.8 WR

Medalists
1st place, gold medalist(s)		Mike Troy	United States
2nd place, silver medalist(s)		Neville Hayes	Australia
3rd place, bronze medalist(s)		Dave Gillanders	United States

The men's 200 metre butterfly event at the 1960 Summer Olympics took place on 31 August and 2 September in Rome, Italy. This swimming event used the butterfly stroke. This race consisted of four lengths of the Stadio Olympico del Nuoto, a 50m Olympic size swimming pool.

== Results ==
=== Heats ===
Five heats were held; the fastest sixteen swimmers advanced to the Semifinals. Because there was a tie for sixteenth place, a swim-off was held to determine the sixteenth swimmer to advance.

Key

Advanced to Semifinals
See Swim-Off
Did Not Advance

==== Heat One ====
Rank	Athlete	Country	Time
1	Mike Troy	United States	2:15.5
2	Kenzo Izutsu	Japan	2:20.3
3	Grigory Kiselyov	Soviet Union	2:24.6
4	Alexandru Popescu	Romania	2:24.6
5	Ian Blyth	Great Britain	2:24.9
6	Giampiero Fossati	Italy	2:31.9
7	Bert Sitters	Netherlands	2:36.6

==== Heat Two ====
Rank	Athlete	Country	Time
1	Fritz Dennerlein	Italy	2:18.3
2	Valentin Kuzmin	Soviet Union	2:19.3
3	Eulalio Ríos Alemán	Mexico	2:22.7
4	Håkan Bengtsson	Sweden	2:25.0
5	Wolfgang Sieber	Germany	2:25.4
6	Gerrit Korteweg	Netherlands	2:26.4
7	Cam Grout	Canada	2:27.7

==== Heat Three ====
Rank	Athlete	Country	Time
1	Dave Gillanders	United States	2:16.2
2	Luis Nicolao	Argentina	2:23.9
3	Pavel Pazdírek	Czechoslovakia	2:24.2
4	Amir Hussin Hamsain	Philippines	2:27.9
5	Luís Vaz Jorge	Portugal	2:28.9
6	Aldo Perseke	Brazil	2:50.8
7	Lovro Radonjić	Yugoslavia	3:00.6

==== Heat Four ====
Rank	Athlete	Country	Time
1	Neville Hayes	Australia	2:18.1
2	Ilkka Suvanto	Finland	2:23.9
3	Jürgen Bachmann	Germany	2:25.0
4	Henri Vidil	France	2:36.0
5	Heriberto de la Fe	Spain	2:37.0
6	Ahiron Radjae	Philippines	2:39.8

==== Heat Five ====
Rank	Athlete	Country	Time
1	Kevin Berry	Australia	2:18.9
2	Haruo Yoshimuta	Japan	2:19.4
3	Fernando Fanjul	Argentina	2:25.2
4	László Kiss	Hungary	2:31.0
5	José Vicente León	Spain	2:31.4
6	Veljko Rogošić	Yugoslavia	2:35.5
7	Fong Seow Hor	Malaya	2:56.4

==== Swim-Off ====
Rank	Athlete	Country	Time
1	Jürgen Bachmann	Germany	2:23.1
2	Håkan Bengtsson	Sweden	2:25.1

=== Semifinals ===
Two heats were held; the fastest eight swimmers advanced to the Finals. Those that advanced are highlighted.

==== Semifinal One ====
Rank	Athlete	Country	Time
1	Mike Troy	United States	2:18.0
2	Neville Hayes	Australia	2:21.6
3	Haruo Yoshimuta	Japan	2:21.7
4	Kevin Berry	Australia	2:23.1
5	Eulalio Ríos Alemán	Mexico	2:24.2
6	Grigory Kiselyov	Soviet Union	2:24.8
7	Luis Nicolao	Argentina	2:26.8
8	Ian Blyth	Great Britain	2:26.8

==== Semifinal Two ====
Rank	Athlete	Country	Time
1	Dave Gillanders	United States	2:18.7
2	Valentin Kuzmin	Soviet Union	2:19.1
3	Fritz Dennerlein	Italy	2:20.5
4	Kenzo Izutsu	Japan	2:21.5
5	Pavel Pazdírek	Czechoslovakia	2:23.5
6	Jürgen Bachmann	Germany	2:28.4
7	Alexandru Popescu	Romania	2:28.5
–	Ilkka Suvanto	Finland	DNF

=== Final ===
Rank	Athlete	Country	Time	Notes
1	Mike Troy	United States	2:12.8	WR
2	Neville Hayes	Australia	2:14.6	
3	Dave Gillanders	United States	2:15.3	
4	Fritz Dennerlein	Italy	2:16.0	
5	Haruo Yoshimuta	Japan	2:18.3	
6	Kevin Berry	Australia	2:18.5	
7	Valentin Kuzmin	Soviet Union	2:18.9	
8	Kenzo Izutsu	Japan	2:19.4	

Key: WR = World record
