= Swimming at the 1956 Summer Olympics – Men's 100 metre backstroke =

Men's 100 metre backstroke at the Games of the XVI Olympiad
- Venue: Melbourne Sports and Entertainment Centre
- Dates: 4 December 1956 (heats); 5 December 1956 (semifinals); 6 December 1956 (final)
- Competitors: 25 from 14 nations
- Winning time: 1:02.2 WR

Medalists
1st place, gold medalist(s)		David Theile; Australia
2nd place, silver medalist(s)		John Monckton; Australia
3rd place, bronze medalist(s)		Frank McKinney; United States

The men's 100 metre backstroke event at the 1956 Olympic Games took place between 4 and 6 December. This swimming event used backstroke. Because an Olympic size swimming pool is 50 metres long, this race consisted of two lengths of the pool.

== Results ==
=== Heats ===
Four heats were held; the swimmers with the sixteen fastest times advanced to the Semifinals. The athletes that advanced are highlighted.

==== Heat One ====
Rank	Athlete	Country	Time
1	Robert Christophe	France	1:04.2
2	John Hayres	Australia	1:04.4
3	László Magyar	Hungary	1:06.1
4	Albert Wiggins	United States	1:06.2
5	Haydn Rigby	Great Britain	1:06.9
6	Ahmed Nazir	Pakistan	1:10.7

==== Heat Two ====
Rank	Athlete	Country	Time
1	Graham Sykes	Great Britain	1:06.2
2	Kazuo Tomita	Japan	1:06.4
3	Gilbert Bozon	France	1:06.4
4	Ekkehard Miersch	Germany	1:07.5
5	Lincoln Hurring	New Zealand	1:07.5
6	Pedro Cayco	Philippines	1:11.6

==== Heat Three ====
Rank	Athlete	Country	Time
1	David Theile	Australia	1:04.3
2	Yoshi Oyakawa	United States	1:05.2
3	Keiji Hase	Japan	1:06.3
4	John Brockway	Great Britain	1:07.7
5	João Gonçalves Filho	Brazil	1:07.9
6	Cheung Kin Man	Hong Kong	1:14.0

==== Heat Four ====
Rank	Athlete	Country	Time
1	John Monckton	Australia	1:03.4
2	Frank McKinney	United States	1:06.0
3	Dieter Pfeifer	Germany	1:06.7
4	Ladislav Bak	Czechoslovakia	1:06.9
5	Gérard Coignot	France	1:07.5
6	Hideo Ninomiya	Japan	1:09.2
7	Lim Heng Chek	Malaya	1:12.4

=== Semifinals ===
Two heats were held; the swimmers with the eight fastest times advanced to the Finals. The swimmers that advanced are highlighted.

==== Semifinal One ====
Rank	Athlete	Country	Time
1	John Monckton	Australia	1:04.1
2	David Theile	Australia	1:04.8
3	Yoshi Oyakawa	United States	1:05.0
4	Graham Sykes	Great Britain	1:06.5
5	Kazuo Tomita	Japan	1:06.5
6	Dieter Pfeifer	Germany	1:07.6
7	László Magyar	Hungary	1:07.6
8	Ladislav Bak	Czechoslovakia	1:07.9

==== Semifinal Two ====
Rank	Athlete	Country	Time
1	Robert Christophe	France	1:04.6
2	John Hayres	Australia	1:05.0
3	Frank McKinney	United States	1:05.3
4	Albert Wiggins	United States	1:06.4
5	Gilbert Bozon	France	1:06.5
6	Keiji Hase	Japan	1:06.5
7	Ekkehard Miersch	Germany	1:06.6
8	Haydn Rigby	Great Britain	1:07.6

=== Final ===
Rank	Athlete	Country	Time	Notes
1	David Theile	Australia	1:02.2	WR
2	John Monckton	Australia	1:03.2	
3	Frank McKinney	United States	1:04.5	
4	Robert Christophe	France	1:04.9	
5	John Hayres	Australia	1:05.0	
6	Graham Sykes	Great Britain	1:05.6	
7	Albert Wiggins	United States	1:05.8	
8	Yoshi Oyakawa	United States	1:06.9	

Key: WR = World record
