= Italy at the 1959 Mediterranean Games =

- IOC code: ITA
- NOC: Italian National Olympic Committee

in Beirut
- Competitors: 55 (55 men)
- Medals Ranked 4th: Gold 12 Silver 5 Bronze 4 Total 21

Mediterranean Games appearances (overview)
- 1951; 1955; 1959; 1963; 1967; 1971; 1975; 1979; 1983; 1987; 1991; 1993; 1997; 2001; 2005; 2009; 2013; 2018; 2022; 2026

Italy competed at the 1959 Mediterranean Games in Beirut, Lebanon.

Italy, at this edition of the Games, had not participated in the athletics competitions.

== Medals ==
=== Gold ===
- Sante Gaiardoni — Track Cycling, Men's Speed
- Sante Gaiardoni — Track Cycling, Men's Kilometer
- Mario Vallotto — Track Cycling, Men's Individual Pursuit
- Track Cycling, Men's Team Pursuit
- Football, Men's Football Team Competition
- Paolo Pucci — Swimming, Men's 100m
- Roberto Lazzari — Swimming, Men's 200m Breaststroke
- Federico Dennerlein — Swimming, Men's 200m Butterfly
- Swimming, Men's 4 x 200m Medley
- Swimming, Men's 4 x 100m Medley
- Lamberto Mari — Diving, Men's High Flight
- Volleyball, Men's Volleyball Team Competition

=== Silver ===
- Valentino Gasparella — Track Cycling, Men's Speed
- Valentino Gasparella — Track Cycling, Men's Kilometer
- Franco Testa — Track Cycling, Men's Individual Pursuit
- Lamberto Mari — Diving, Men's Springboard
- Waterpolo, Men's Waterpolo Team Competition

=== Bronze ===
- Sergio Bianchetto — Track Cycling, Men's Speed
- Giuseppe Beghetto — Track Cycling, Men's Speed
- Giorgio Perondini — Swimming, Men's 100m
- Christian Schollmeier — Swimming, Men's 100m Backstroke

== See also ==
- Football at the 1959 Mediterranean Games
- Volleyball at the 1959 Mediterranean Games
