= Swimming at the 1960 Summer Olympics – Men's 200 metre breaststroke =

Men's 200 metre breaststroke at the Games of the XVII Olympiad
- Venue: Stadio Olimpico del Nuoto
- Dates: 26–27 August 1960 (heats; swim-off); 29 August 1960 (semifinals); 30 August 1960 (final)
- Competitors: 42 from 30 nations
- Winning time: 2:37.4

Medalists
1st place, gold medalist(s)		Bill Mulliken	United States
2nd place, silver medalist(s)		Yoshihiko Osaki	Japan
3rd place, bronze medalist(s)		Wieger Mensonides	Netherlands

The men's 200 metre breaststroke event at the 1960 Olympic Games took place between 26 and 30 August.

== Results ==
=== Heats ===
Six heats were held; the swimmers with the sixteen fastest times advanced to the Semifinals. Because there were three swimmers with a time of 2:42.4, a swim-off was held to determine the two that would advance.

Key

Advanced to Semifinal
See Swim-Off
Did Not Advance

==== Heat One ====
Rank	Athlete	Country	Time
1	Bill Mulliken	United States	2:38.0
2	Georgy Prokopenko	Soviet Union	2:39.2
3	Gerard Rowlinson	Great Britain	2:45.0
4	Engin Ünal	Turkey	2:49.0
5	Antonio Saloso	Philippines	2:53.3
–	László Felkai	Hungary	DQ
–	Gerald Brauner	Austria	DQ

==== Heat Two ====
Rank	Athlete	Country	Time
1	Arkadiy Holovchenko	Soviet Union	2:41.0
2	Đorđe Perišić	Yugoslavia	2:41.1
3	Christopher Walkden	Great Britain	2:41.5
4	Mihai Mitrofan	Romania	2:41.8
5	Farid Zablith Filho	Brazil	2:48.6
6	Roland Boullanger	France	2:54.4
7	Nicolas Wildhaber	Switzerland	2:58.7

==== Heat Three ====
Rank	Athlete	Country	Time
1	Wieger Mensonides	Netherlands	2:39.0
2	Roberto Lazzari	Italy	2:41.2
3	Konrad Enke	Germany	2:44.6
4	Richard Audoly	France	2:46.5
5	Pierpaolo Spangaro	Italy	2:53.8
6	Tony Williams	Sri Lanka	2:59.8

==== Heat Four ====
Rank	Athlete	Country	Time
1	Isao Masuda	Japan	2:41.2
2	Terry Gathercole	Australia	2:41.7
3	Pekka Lairola	Finland	2:43.3
4	Bernt Nilsson	Sweden	2:45.7
5	Steve Rabinovitch	Canada	2:47.2
6	Laurel Lee	Chinese Taipei	2:52.8
7	Werner Risi	Switzerland	2:56.6

==== Heat Five ====
Rank	Athlete	Country	Time
1	Paul Hait	United States	2:40.8
2	Andrzej Kłopotowski	Poland	2:41.4
3	György Kunsági	Hungary	2:42.2
4	Egon Henninger	Germany	2:42.4
5	Vítězslav Svozil	Czechoslovakia	2:42.4
6	Emilio Díaz	Spain	2:52.9
7	Trương Ke Nhon	South Vietnam	2:53.0
–	Erny Schweitzer	Luxembourg	DQ

==== Heat Six ====
Rank	Athlete	Country	Time
1	Yoshihiko Osaki	Japan	2:39.1
2	Gilbert Desmit	Belgium	2:42.4
3	Tommie Lindström	Sweden	2:42.8
4	William Burton	Australia	2:43.9
5	Guillermo Alsina	Spain	2:51.4
6	Gershon Shefa	Israel	2:51.7
7	Nikolaos Zakharopoulos	Greece	2:56.4

==== Swim-Off ====
Rank	Athlete	Country	Time
1	Egon Henninger	Germany	2:39.5
2	Gilbert Desmit	Belgium	2:41.1
3	Vítězslav Svozil	Czechoslovakia	2:41.7

=== Semifinals ===
Two heats were held; the fastest eight swimmers advanced to the Finals. Those that advanced are highlighted.

==== Semifinal One ====
Rank	Athlete	Country	Time
1	Bill Mulliken	United States	2:37.2
2	Yoshihiko Osaki	Japan	2:38.2
3	Egon Henninger	Germany	2:38.5
4	Roberto Lazzari	Italy	2:40.3
5	Arkady Golovchenko	Soviet Union	2:40.9
6	Mihai Mitrofan	Romania	2:41.6
7	Christopher Walkden	Great Britain	2:41.7
8	Đorđe Perišić	Yugoslavia	2:44.2

==== Semifinal Two ====
Rank	Athlete	Country	Time
1	Terry Gathercole	Australia	2:39.1
2	Wieger Mensonides	Netherlands	2:39.3
3	Paul Hait	United States	2:39.6
4	Andrzej Kłopotowski	Poland	2:40.8
5	Georgy Prokopenko	Soviet Union	2:41.0
6	Gilbert Desmit	Belgium	2:41.8
7	Isao Masuda	Japan	2:42.3
8	György Kunsági	Hungary	2:42.4

=== Final ===
Rank	Athlete	Country	Time	Notes
1	Bill Mulliken	United States	2:37.4	
2	Yoshihiko Osaki	Japan	2:38.0	
3	Wieger Mensonides	Netherlands	2:39.7	
4	Egon Henninger	United Team of Germany	2:40.1	
5	Roberto Lazzari	Italy	2:40.1	
6	Terry Gathercole	Australia	2:40.2	
7	Andrzej Kłopotowski	Poland	2:41.2	
8	Paul Hait	United States	2:41.4	
