= Jan Stender =

Dutch swimming coach (1906–1989)

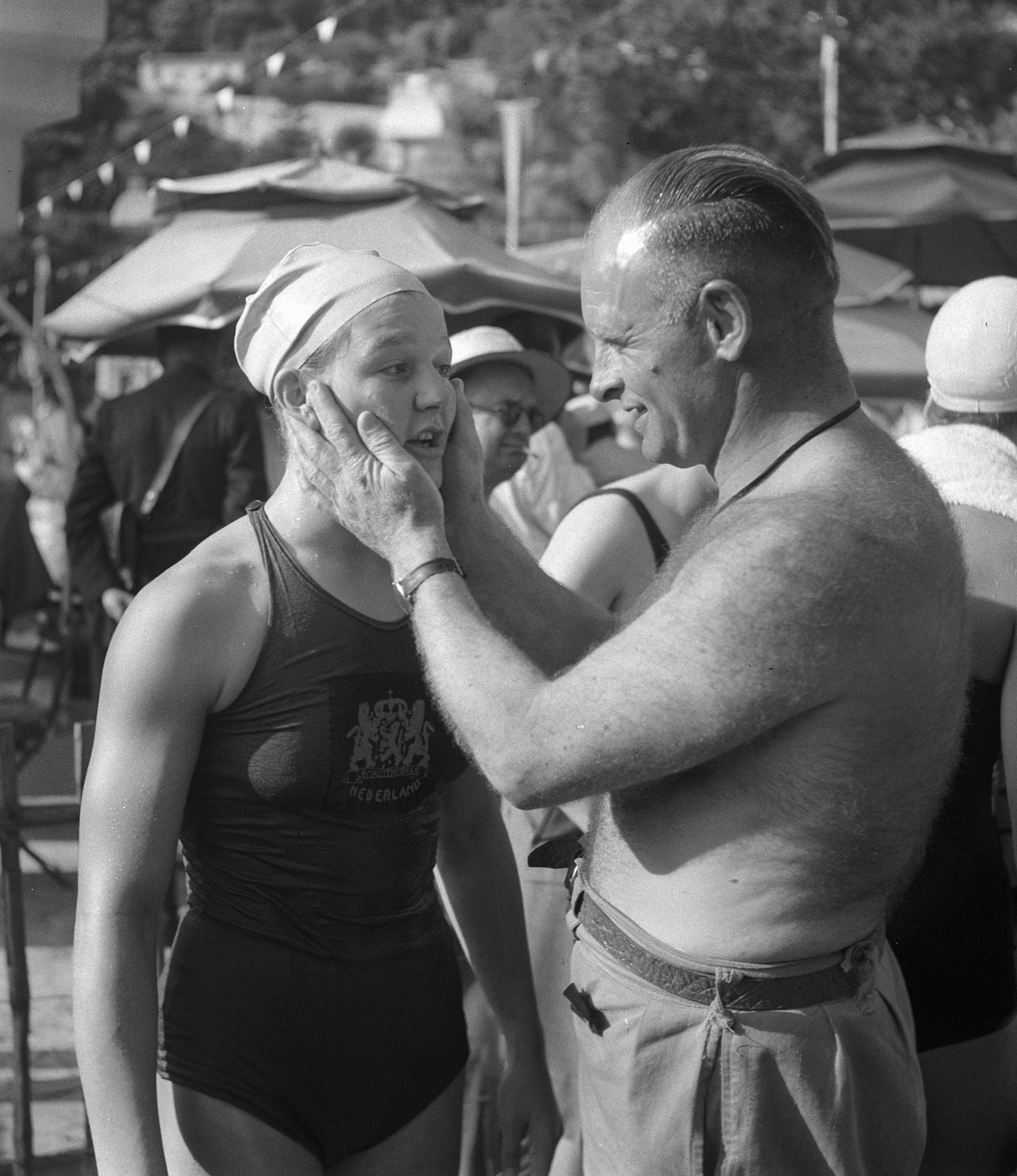
- Jan Stender with Nel van Vliet in 1947

Personal information
- Born: May 7, 1906 Zaandam, Netherlands
- Died: October 20, 1989 (aged 83)

Sport
- Sport: Swimming, water polo

Jan Stender (7 May 1906 – 20 October 1989) was a Dutch swimming coach. During the 1940s–1950s he coached at least eight world record holders who set more than 50 world records in total. In 1973, he was inducted into the International Swimming Hall of Fame.

== Biography ==
Stender was born in Zaandam. He spent his youth as an avid sportsman, practising swimming, football, cycling, running, boxing, skating and water polo. In 1931, he was a member of the water polo team De Dolfijn from Amsterdam that won the national championships, and as a result was selected into the national team. In 1937, he was employed as the coach of the swimming club of Hilversum. He soon became known for arduous fitness routines where significant time was spent out of the pool. His first success was the silver medal by Tonny Bijland in 200 m breaststroke at the 1939 national championships – the first medal in the history of the club.

After World War II, he raised his first international star, Nel van Vliet, a European (1947) and Olympic (1948) gold medalist who set 13 world records in 1946–1947. Instead of searching for talent countrywide, Stender tried to develop it in every athlete, and was said to be able "to teach a piece of iron to swim" (Dutch: een stuk ijzer kon leren zwemmen). By 1955, he produced eight world record holders among girls living nearby in Hilversum, a town of fewer than 100,000 people. His pupils by then included Nel van Vliet, Mary Kok, Geertje Wielema, Hannie Termeulen, Lenie de Nijs, Judith de Nijs, Atie Voorbij, Greetje Kraan, Ineke Tigelaar, Rita Tigelaar, Rita Kroon and Herman Willemse. However, the next year brought him a great upset: none of them could compete in the 1956 Summer Olympics because of its boycott by the Dutch government.

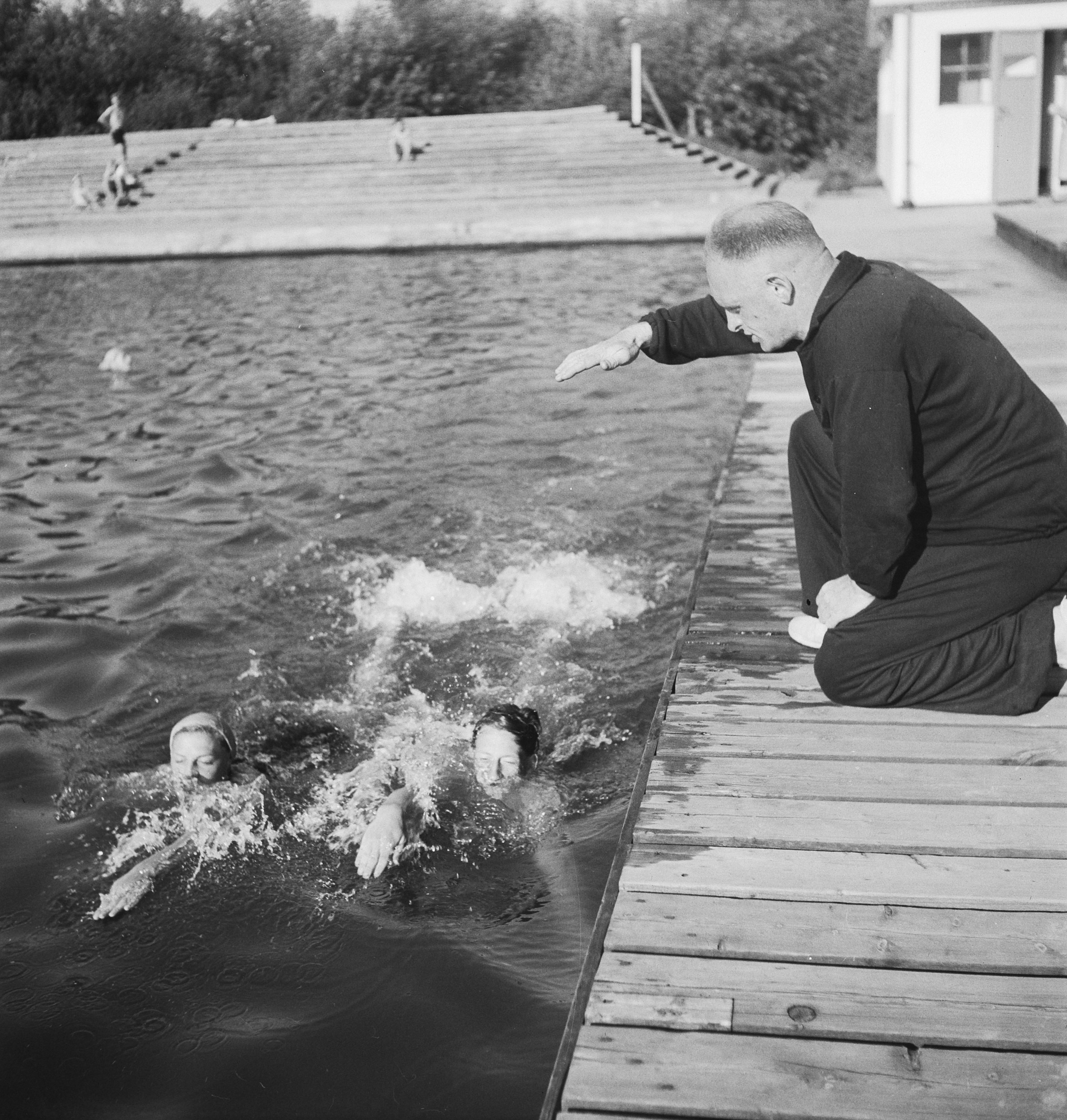
Jan Stender coaching in 1948

In 1973, at the age 67, Stender was inducted into the International Swimming Hall of Fame. He celebrated this event by running 20 times around the Hall of Fame campus (ca. 7 miles). During those years he was still swimming, spending an hour in a gym and running 13 km daily.

== See also ==
- List of members of the International Swimming Hall of Fame

== Bibliography ==
- Jan-Bram van Luit, Op het gift der tweespalt glorieerde de zwemsport in Hilversum. HHT-EP 2009/2, pp. 56–66 (in Dutch)
