= Atie Voorbij =

Dutch swimmer (1940–2024)

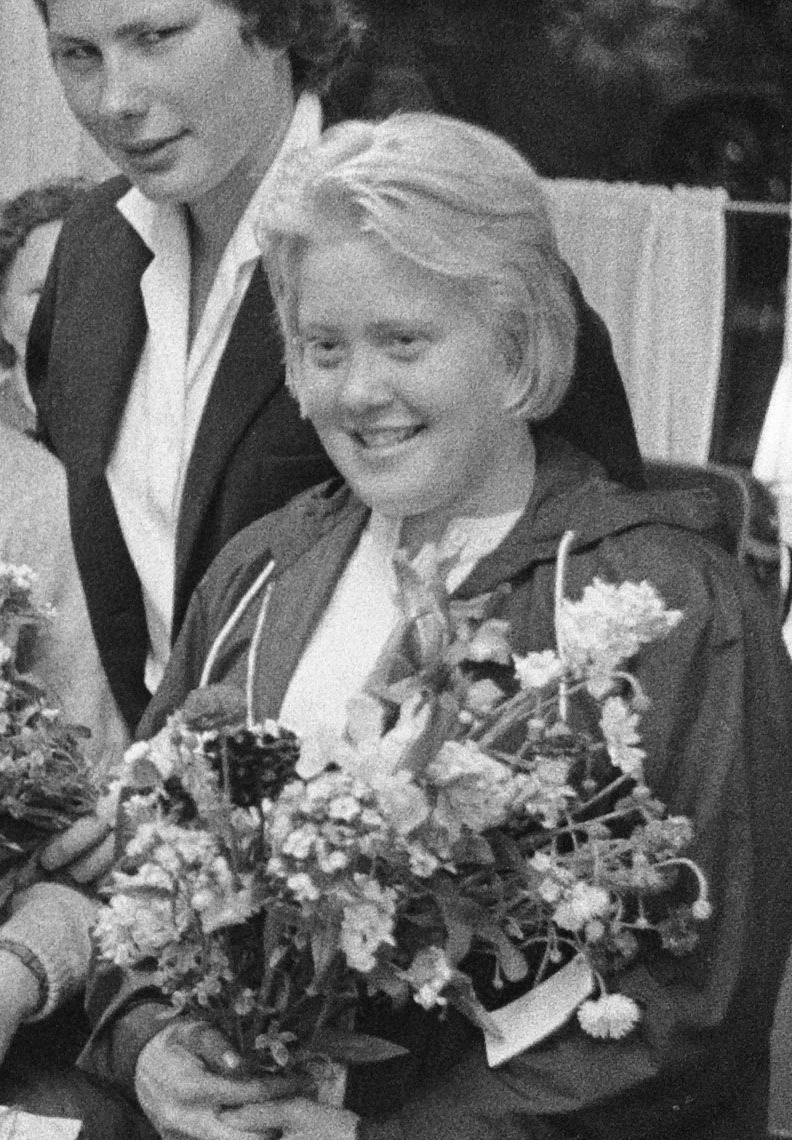
- Voorbij in 1960

Personal information
- Born: 20 September 1940 Hilversum, German-occupied Netherlands
- Died: 3 March 2024 (aged 83)
- Height: 1.64 m (5 ft 5 in)
- Weight: 63 kg (139 lb)

Sport
- Sport: Swimming
- Club: De Robben, Hilversum
Medal record
Representing the Netherlands
European Championships
Gold medal – first place	1958 Budapest	4×100 m medley
Silver medal – second place	1958 Budapest	100 m butterfly

Aartje Johanna "Atie" Voorbij (20 September 1940 – 3 March 2024) was a Dutch butterfly swimmer whose specialty was 100 meter butterfly. She won a gold medal in the 4×100 m medley team event (together with Ada den Haan, Cocky Gastelaars and Lenie de Nijs) at the 1958 European Aquatics Championships. She also won a silver medal in 100 m butterfly at the same championships. She was coached by Jan Stender and Wil van Breukelen.

She participated in the 1960 Summer Olympics and was fifth in 100 m butterfly. Between 1955 and 1960 she was five times national champion in 100 m butterfly and set nine world records in the 100 m butterfly and 4×100 m medley events.

Voorbij died on 3 March 2024, at the age of 83.
