= Lenie de Nijs =

Dutch swimmer (1939–2023)

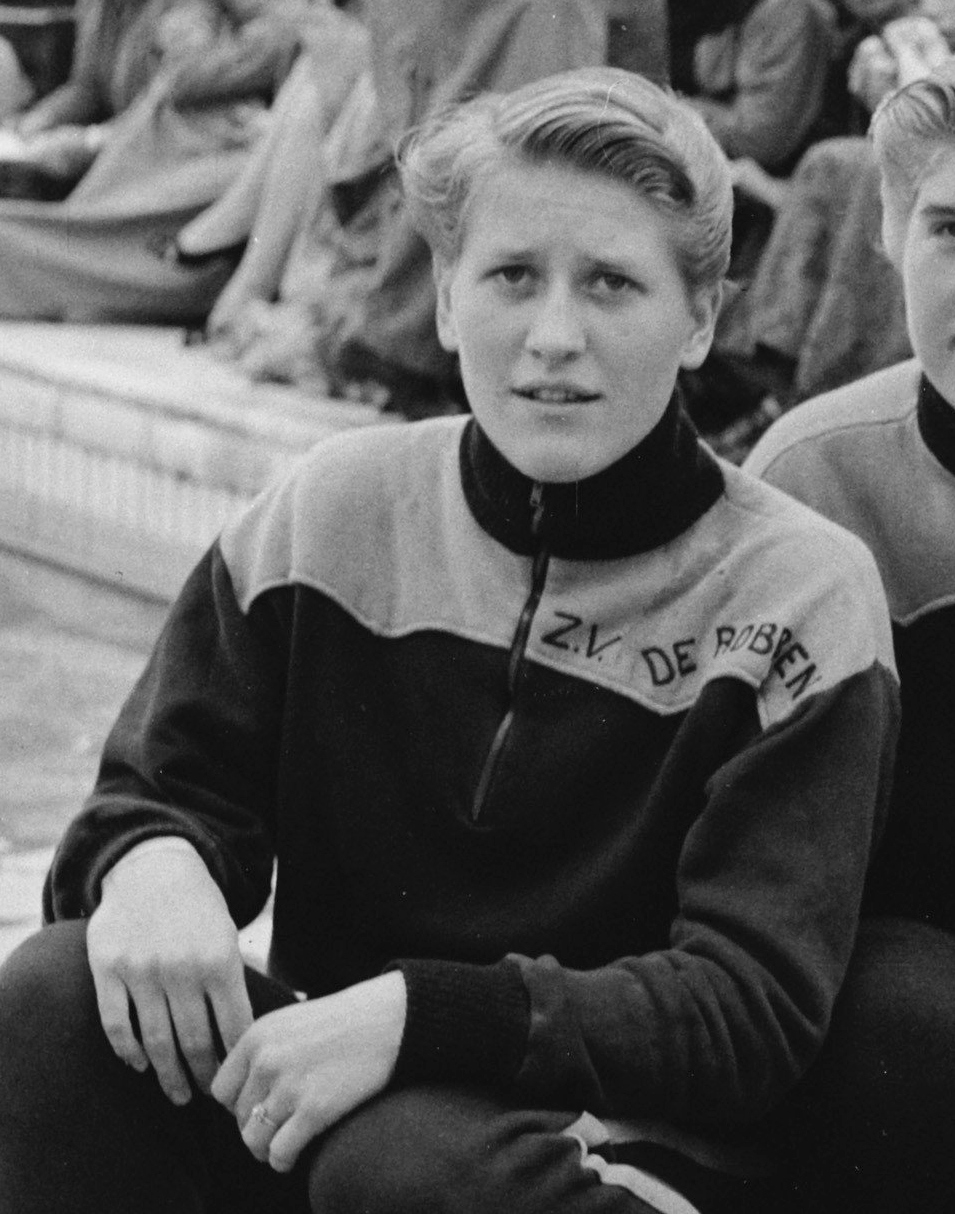
- De Nijs in 1956

Personal information
- Born: April 1939 Hilversum, Netherlands
- Died: 22 January 2023 (aged 83) Torroella de Montgrí, Spain

Sport
- Sport: Swimming
- Strokes: Freestyle, backstroke
- Club: HZC de Robben, Hilversum
- Coach: Jan Stender
Medal record
Representing the Netherlands
European Championships
Gold medal – first place	1958 Budapest	4×100 m medley

Helena Elisabeth "Lenie" de Nijs (April 1939 – 22 January 2023) was a Dutch swimmer. In July-August 1955 she broke three freestyle world records over 1500 m, 880 yd and 1760 yd distances. She then changed to backstroke, winning three national titles over 100 m (1956–1958) and setting world records in the 200 m backstroke (1957) and 4×100 m medley relay events (1956 and 1958); she set her last record while winning the European title in Budapest, together with Ada den Haan, Cocky Gastelaars and Atie Voorbij. She qualified for the 1956 Summer Olympics, but could not participate due to the boycott of those games by the Netherlands.

As a child, de Nijs was diagnosed with chronic asthma and bronchitis and the doctor advised her to join a sport club to improve health. After retiring from swimming she married the Dutch water polo player Harry Vriend on 4 October 1963. Her younger sister Judith was also a world-level swimmer.

De Nijs died on 22 January 2023, at the age of 83.

== See also ==
- World record progression 200 metres backstroke
- World record progression 1500 metres freestyle

Records
Preceded by Ragnhild Hveger	Women's 1500 metres freestyle world record holder (long course); 23 July 1955 – 21 August 1956	Succeeded by Jans Koster
Preceded by Philippa Gould	Women's 200 metres backstroke world record holder (long course); 17 May 1957 – 1 August 1958	Succeeded by Chris von Saltza
