= Henry Elionsky =

American swimmer

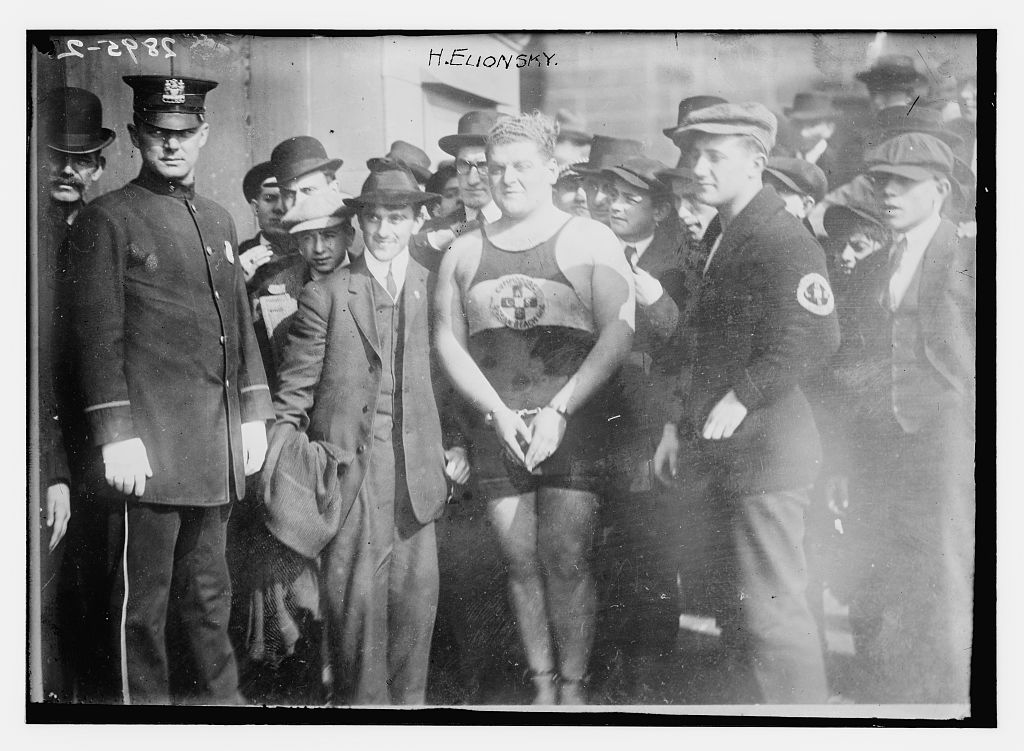
- Elionsky circa 1913

Personal information
- Born: April 12, 1893 Riga, Livonia
- Died: March 14, 1956 (aged 62)

Sport
- Sport: Swimming

Henry Elionsky (April 12, 1893 – March 14, 1956), also known as Buster Elionsky, was a champion long-distance swimmer and handicap swimmer in open water swimming. Henry was sometimes mistakenly referred to as Harry Elionsky in news releases. Harry Elionsky was Henry's father.

== Biography ==
Henry's family migrated to the U.S. in the 19th century from Riga, on the Baltic seacoast of Livonia. His siblings were Ida, Morris, and John, and the family eventually shortened their surname to Elion, or Eliott.

On September 24, 1915, his sister, Ida Elionsky, set a long-distance swimming mark when she swam around Manhattan, covering 40 miles in 11 hours and 35 minutes with Henry tied to her back.

From 1914 to at least 1917 he was living in New London, Connecticut.

In 1916 he attempted to swim from Battery Park to Sandy Hook. It took him 14 hours, 29 minutes, but he fell 1/4 mile short of the beach.

With two men tied to him with thirty-five yards of heavy rope and his hands bound, and weighing 265 pounds, he swam through Hell Gate in the East River on November 14, 1916. The distance was one and a half miles, but crossed the treacherous passage. Near the end of the swim, the three men came close to drowning in a whirlpool beneath the Queensboro Bridge. Elionsky said that in this crisis, the men tied to him panicked and struggled and sent him under the water repeatedly. The men had been followed by a boat and were rescued. The men tied to him had their arms fastened around Elionsky's waist, weighed 140 pounds and 165 pounds respectively, the rope weighed 18 pounds, thus Elionsky carried 323 pounds of dead weight.

It was reported on October 13, 1918, that he had died during the 1918 flu pandemic, but that was an error.

In 1920, he set out to break his own record by swimming 100 miles from Battery Park to Sandy Hook, New Jersey.
