= Nikolaos Zakharopoulos =

Greek swimmer

Personal information
- Born: 1944 (age 81–82) Patras, Greece

Sport
- Sport: Swimming
Medal record
Representing Greece
Mediterranean Games
Bronze medal – third place	1959 Beirut	200m breaststroke

Nikolaos Zakharopoulos (born 1944) is a Greek former swimmer. He competed in the men's 200 metre breaststroke at the 1960 Summer Olympics.
