= Long-distance swimming =

Swimming competitions with longer distances

Long-distance swimming is distinguished from ordinary swimming in that the distances involved are longer than are typically swam in pool competitions. When a given swim calls more on endurance than on outright speed, it is the more likely to be considered a long-distance swim. Long-distance swims, however, may take place in pools, such as the 1st official 24 hours World Championship in 1976 won by Peppo Biscarini with a record of 83.7 km (24-hour swims in a 50-meter-long pool) or the current 25-meter pool world record of 2008 Olympic gold medalist Maarten van der Weijden. Some of the better-known long-distance swims are crossings of the English Channel, Catalina Channel, Fehmarn Belt, Cook Strait, and Bass Strait, the latter of which has only ever been done once (by Tammy van Wisse in 1996).

Ultra-long-distance swimming is sometimes referred to as marathon swimming. The minimum distance that constitutes a marathon swim has dramatically shortened over time. Different organizations adopt various minimum distances. The swimming marathon events at the Olympic games have a distance of 10 km.

Long-distance swims tend to fall into one of two categories: (1) swims in which the start date and start time are chosen by the individual swimmer (often called solo-swims), and (2) swims that involve a group-start.

Long-distance swimming is one of the few events where there are women's records that beat men's records under equal conditions.

== Organization regulations ==
Swim organizations, for the purposes of their record keeping, often impose other rules. FINA and International Marathon Swimming Hall of Fame do not keep records for swims that employ thermal insulating material, drag reduction fabrics, buoyancy aids, breathing apparatus, propulsion prosthetics, etc. For major channel crossings, most organizations do allow the swimmer to use outside help, an example being that the swimmer swims alongside a boat that uses sophisticated electronics and telecommunications to help the swimmer take the easiest path through surface currents and tides. Such boats can also make the challenge easier for the swimmer by blocking wind and surface chop. Such boats also carry food and hot beverages for the swimmer to consume periodically during the swim (e.g. every 20 to 30 minutes).

In another variant, some swim organizations simply have different sets of records for different equipment scenarios (e.g. wetsuit and non-wetsuit divisions), similar to the structure of free diving record keeping.

== Long-distance swimming in the Netherlands ==
The Netherlands has a rich tradition in these races, which are known in Dutch as langebaanzwemmen (literally "long-lane swimming"). As of 2004, some have been organised continually for over 50 years. Many Dutch competitors have also achieved prestige in the international arena, such as Herman Willemse, Judith de Nijs, Lenie de Nijs, Joke van Staveren, Monique Wildschut, Irene van der Laan, Hans van Goor, Edith van Dijk and Maarten van der Weijden (Olympic medalist).

In the Netherlands, there are three categories of langebaanzwemmen:

- Prestatietochten (lit. "achievement-tour"): distances over 250 m for all categories (inclusive of participants without a racing permit).
- Langeafstandzwemmen (lit. "long-distance swimming): distances up to 10 km. This category includes open water events. In this category there are the Open Nationale Kampioenschappen in 5 km and 10 km freestyle, with separate events for professionals and amateurs, and
- Marathonzwemmen (lit. "marathon swimming"): distances over 10 km. The Nationale Kampioenschappen (national championships) in this category is a joint venture with neighbouring Belgium.

Most events are in the long-distance category, with around 25 in the Netherlands. An approximately equal number are organised in Flanders in Belgium. The waterways of the Low Countries, therefore, are some of the busiest in open-water swimming in the world.

== See also ==
- Category: Long-distance swimmers
- Open water swimming
- Marathon swimming
