= Pazdírek =

Pazdírek is a masculine Czech surname. Its feminine counterpart is Pazdírkova. Notable people with the surname include:

- Pavel Pazdírek (born 1937), Czech swimmer
- Zdeněk Pazdírek (born 1953), Czech figure skater
