= Bill Mulliken =

American swimmer (1939–2014)

- Mullikin, 1960 Olympic photo, around 21

Personal information
- Full name: William Danforth Mulliken
- National team: United States
- Born: August 27, 1939 Urbana, Illinois, U.S.
- Died: July 17, 2014 (aged 74) Chicago, Illinois, U.S.
- Height: 6 ft 2 in (1.88 m)
- Weight: 183 lb (83 kg)
- Spouse: Lorna Filippini

Sport
- Sport: Swimming
- Strokes: Breaststroke
- College team: Miami of Ohio; Miami University
- Coach: Raymond Ray (Miami)
Medal record
Men's swimming
Representing the United States
Olympic Games
Gold medal – first place	1960 Rome	200 m breaststroke
Pan American Games
Gold medal – first place	1959 Chicago	200 m breaststroke

William Danforth Mulliken (August 27, 1939 – July 17, 2014) was a Hall of Fame American competition swimmer who attended Miami University in Oxford and was a 1960 Rome Olympic champion in the men's 200-meter breaststroke. He later practiced law in Chicago, and served as a twenty-year President of the Chicago Masters Swim Club.

== Early life and swimming ==
Born August 27, 1939, in Urbana, Illinois, to Jean Forrest and Wallace Mulliken, he attended Champaign High School, which lacked a swimming team. While competing at the Central AAU Senior Men's Swimming meet on August 2, 1956, at 16, he set a record age-group time in the 200-meter breaststroke of 2:52.7 bettering a record that had stood for nineteen years. He trained largely on his own, though usually represented the Champaign Country Club, a strong Chicago area team that competed in the Central Illinois Country Club tournament and under whose name he was entering competitions by the age of 14. Mulliken competed against his cousin Lynn Mulliken of Bloomington High School, and won the 200-yard freestyle in a new record time of 2:04.9 at the Big 12 High School Championship on February 11, 1956.

=== Illinois state championships ===
Despite lacking strong team training, at the Illinois High School Swimming and Diving Championships, he won state titles in the 100-yard breaststroke of 1:03.9 and the 200-yard freestyle of 1:59.8 for 1956-7 during his time at Champaign High School.

Mulliken represented the United States at the 1959 Pan American Games, where he captured a gold medal winning the 200-meter breaststroke, his signature event, in 2:43.1, though he would improve significantly on his time in the 1960 Olympics.

=== Miami of Ohio ===
He swam for Miami of Ohio University, known as Miami University in Oxford, Ohio, graduating in 1961 with a bachelor's degree. While swimming for Miami, Mulliken became the University's first NCAA and Olympic swimming champion and set 15 school records before graduating. In the 1959 NCAA Swimming Championships, he set both an American and NCAA record time of 2:21.3 in the 200-yard breaststroke. In Mid-American Conference Collegiate competition, during a three year period, he won nine individual titles and captured four new records.

Coached by Miami University's first swimming coach, Raymond Ray, who led Miami from 1952–74, and coached five all Americans during his tenure, Mulliken held the national collegiate record in the 200-yard breaststroke, the national record in the indoor 220-yard breaststroke, and set 200-meter breaststroke records in both Olympic and Pan American competition.

== 1960 Rome Olympic gold medal ==
Despite being ranked only 17th in the world going into the 1960 Summer Olympics in Rome, in a performance that exceeded expectations, Mulliken captured a gold medal for winning the men's 200-meter breaststroke with a time of 2:37.2, a new Olympic record. Three of his opponents were heavily favored to outperform him; Yoshihiko Osaki of Japan, Georgi Prokopenko of the Soviet Union and Australian world record holder Terry Gathercole. On his third turn in the 50-meter course, coming into the final length, Mulliken realized that with a strong finish he could overtake Osaki, and likely set a new Olympic record. Finishing a second after Mulliken, Osaki of Japan won the silver, but Australian Gathercole finished sixth, and Russian Propkopenko finished tenth, unable to qualify for the finals.

His unexpected win inspired the U.S. team, as an American had not won the Olympic event since Joe Verdeur at the 1948 Games in London. Mullikin was managed by Head U.S. Olympic Swimming Coach Gus Stager in 1960, a Hall of Fame Coach for the University of Michigan.

=== Post-swimming career ===
Mullikin graduated Harvard University in 1964 with a law degree.

Mullikin would practice law in the Chicago area, and become an accomplished United States Masters swimmer. He retired as general counsel and senior vice president of ChemCentral Corp. in 2004. An avid reader, he was an active member, supporter and leader of the Caxton Club of Chicago. At the time of his death he had a collection of over 5,000 books. An active alumni, he also chaired the capital campaign for Miami University's Library.

His first marriage was to Julia N. Neavolls. They had two daughters and a son before the marriage ended in divorce. He later married Lorna Filippini.

In 1991, Mulliken founded Big Shoulders, a swim event in Lake Michigan at Ohio Street Beach and held annually since. A major event, by 2018, the swim had 1,200 swimmers and included a 2k and 2.5k Open water swim.

=== Honors ===
Mulliken became a member of the University of Miami's Athletic Hall of Fame in 1971, and was also a member of the International Swimming Hall of Fame.

After a stroke, Mulliken died in Chicago at 74, on Thursday, July 17. He was survived by his wife, Lorna Filippini-Mulliken, two daughters and a son from his first marriage, siblings and numerous grandchildren. He had suffered two former strokes. An avid swimmer, he had formerly served for 20 years as a past president of Chicago Masters swimming. A memorial service was held at Smith-Corcoran Funeral Home on August 30.

== See also ==
- List of members of the International Swimming Hall of Fame
- List of Miami University people
- List of Olympic medalists in swimming (men)
