= Swimming at the 1959 Mediterranean Games =

- Location: Beirut, Lebanon
- Dates: 11–23 October 1959

The swimming competition at the 1959 Mediterranean Games was held in Beirut, Lebanon.

== Medallists ==
=== Men's events ===
Games	Gold		Silver		Bronze	
100 m freestyle	Paolo Pucci; Italy	57.2	Janez Kocmur; Yugoslavia	58.2	Giorgio Perondini; Italy	58.4
400 m freestyle	Vlado Brinovec; Yugoslavia	4:44.5	Milan Jeger; Yugoslavia	4:44.9	Guy Montserret; France	4:47.8
1500 m freestyle	Guy Montserret; France	19:05.4	Vlado Brinovec; Yugoslavia	19:48.6	Zein Yahia Ahmed; United Arab Republic	20:03.6
100 m backstroke	Robert Christophe; France	1:04.8	Mihovil Dorčić; Yugoslavia	1:06.4	Christian Schollmeier; Italy	1:08.1
200 m breaststroke	Roberto Lazzari; Italy	2:48.7	Guillermo Alsina; Spain	2:51.8	Zakaropoulos; Greece	2:55.6
200 m butterfly	Federico Dennerlein; Italy	2:26.7	René Pirolley; France	2:30.3	José Vicente León; Spain	2:36.1
4 × 200 m freestyle relay	Italy	8:50.6	Yugoslavia	9:00.7	France	9:09.7
4 × 100 m medley relay	Italy	4:27.1	France	4:31.0	Yugoslavia	4:35.7

== Medal table ==
Rank	Nation	Gold	Silver	Bronze	Total
1	Italy	5	0	2	7
2	France	2	2	2	6
3	Yugoslavia	1	5	1	7
4	Spain	0	1	1	2
5	Greece	0	0	1	1
5	United Arab Republic	0	0	1	1
Totals (6 entries)		8	8	8	24
