= Ida Elionsky =

American swimmer

Personal information
- Born: 1902
- Died: 1983 (aged 80–81)

Sport
- Sport: Swimming
- Strokes: Long-distance swimming

Ida Elionsky (1902 – 1983) was a champion long-distance swimmer and handicap swimmer. She was the first woman to swim around the island of Manhattan.

== Biography ==
Elionsky was the sister of Henry Elionsky, also a champion swimmer of that era. She set the long distance swimming record on September 24, 1916 when she swam around Manhattan, 40 miles (64 km), in 11 hours and 35 minutes. In a separate demonstration, she swam 3 miles down the Hudson River with her brother tied to her back.
