= Ahmed Nazir =

Pakistani swimmer

Personal information
- Born: 1934 (age 91–92)

Sport
- Sport: Swimming

Ahmed Nazir (born 1934) is a Pakistani former swimmer. He competed in the men's 100 metre backstroke at the 1956 Summer Olympics.
