= Engin Ünal =

Turkish swimmer

Personal information
- Born: 30 September 1936 Çankaya, Turkey
- Died: 11 September 2016 (aged 79)

Sport
- Sport: Swimming

Engin Ünal (30 September 1936 – 11 September 2016) was a Turkish swimmer. He competed in the men's 200 metre breaststroke at the 1960 Summer Olympics.
