= Vlado Brinovec =

Slovenian swimmer (1941–2006)

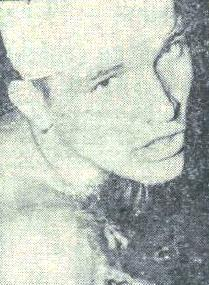

Personal information
- Born: June 16, 1941 Kranj, Yugoslavia
- Died: August 8, 2006 (aged 65)

Sport
- Sport: Swimming
Medal record
Representing Yugoslavia
Mediterranean Games
Gold medal – first place	1959 Beirut	400m freestyle
Silver medal – second place	1959 Beirut	1500m freestyle

Vladimir “Vlado” Brinovec (16 June 1941 – August 2006) was a Slovenian swimmer who competed in the 1960 Summer Olympics. He was born in Kranj.
