= Corrie Schimmel =

Dutch swimmer (born 1939)

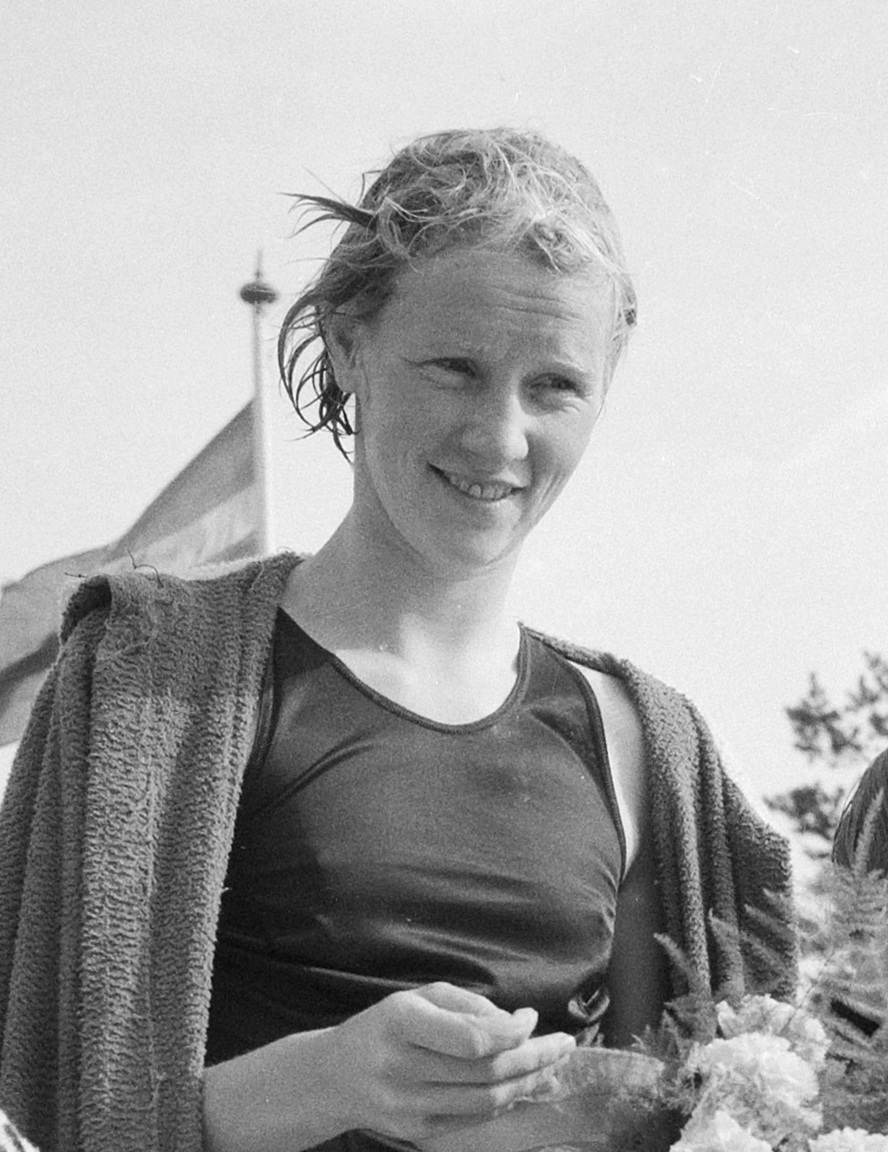
- Corrie Schimmel in 1959

Personal information
- Born: 29 April 1939 (age 87) Bussum, the Netherlands
- Height: 1.69 m (5 ft 7 in)
- Weight: 53 kg (117 lb)

Sport
- Sport: Swimming
- Club: Het Gooi, Bussum
Medal record
Representing the Netherlands
European championships
Gold medal – first place	1958 Budapest	4×100 m freestyle
Silver medal – second place	1958 Budapest	400 m freestyle

Cornelia Hendrika Schimmel (born 29 April 1939) is a Dutch former swimmer who won a gold and silver medal at the 1958 European championships. Two years later she competed at the 1960 Summer Olympics and finished sevenths in the 400 m freestyle. Between 1957 and 1960 she won five national titles in the 400 m and 1500 m freestyle. In 1959–1960 she also set 10 European records in the 200–1500 m events.
