= Richard Audoly =

French swimmer

Personal information
- Nationality: French
- Born: 6 March 1943 (age 83) Marseille, France

Sport
- Sport: Swimming

Richard Audoly (born 6 March 1943) is a French former swimmer. He competed in the men's 200 metre breaststroke at the 1960 Summer Olympics.
