= Emilio Díaz =

Spanish swimmer

Personal information
- Nationality: Spanish
- Born: 18 April 1940 (age 86) Huelva, Spain

Sport
- Sport: Swimming

Emilio Díaz (born 18 April 1940) is a Spanish former swimmer. He competed in the men's 200 metre breaststroke at the 1960 Summer Olympics.
