= Raisa Gorokhovskaya =

Soviet diver (1932–2020)

Personal information
- Born: 12 February 1932 Moscow, Russian SFSR, Soviet Union
- Died: 26 July 2020 (aged 88)
- Height: 1.48 m (4 ft 10 in)
- Weight: 46 kg (101 lb)

Sport
- Sport: Diving
- Club: Burevestnik, Leningrad
Medal record
European Championships
Silver medal – second place	1958 Budapest	10 m platform

Raisa Petrovna Gorokhovskaya (Russian: Раиса Петровна Гороховская; 12 February 1932 – 26 July 2020) was a Soviet diver who won a silver medal at the 1958 European Aquatics Championships in the 10 m platform. She also competed at the 1956 and at the 1960 Summer Olympics and finished in ninth and fifth place, respectively.

== Biography ==
She was born in Moscow and between 1946 and 1949 studied at a circus school. In 1947 she was invited to train in a diving club and won the Moscow championships in the same year. While she had a strong base in acrobatics, it took her a year to learn swimming. Until then, a coach was helping her out of water with a pole after a jump.

In 1950 she married Leonid Zakharovich Gorokhovsky (Russian: Леонид Захарович Гороховский, b. 1925), a Navy officer who took her away to Saint Petersburg. They have two sons, born in 1952 and 1964. In 1953, her husband started studying the theory of diving and later became the first Soviet diving coach with a PhD in the subject. Between 1962 and 1969 he worked with the Uzbekistani diving team in Tashkent, and in 1969 moved to Moscow to coach the Soviet diving team.

After retirement from senior competitions in 1969 Gorokhovskaya worked for 40 years as a physiotherapists, at a Moscow boarding school for children with cerebral palsy. Her first son had the same disability, which motivated her to choose this profession.

Since 1992, she competed in the masters category and won 15 European and world titles in diving. Because of her small weight she always preferred a fixed diving platform to springboard. She also competed in masters swimming at the national level.
