= Galina Kamaeva =

Soviet swimmer (born 1939)

Personal information
- Born: December 31, 1939 Vladivostok, Russian SFSR, Soviet Union
- Died: April 2, 2010 (aged 70) Chernyakhovsk
- Height: 165 cm (5 ft 5 in)

Sport
- Sport: Swimming
- Club: Spartak
Medal record
Representing Soviet Union
European Championships
Silver medal – second place	1958 Budapest	4×100 m medley

Galina Kamaeva (Russian: Галина Камаева; born 1939) is a Soviet swimmer who won a silver medal in the 4×100 m medley relay at the 1958 European Aquatics Championships, where she swam the butterfly

Between 1956 and 1959 she won several national titles in butterfly, backstroke and medley events. In the 2000s, she competed in the masters category and won 15 national titles, setting four national records.

She was born in Vladivostok, leaved in Volgograd, than moved to Kaunas (Lithuania) then moved to Chernyakhovsk. After marriage, she changed her last name to Egorova (Russian: Егорова).
