= Andrzej Kłopotowski =

Polish swimmer

Personal information
- Full name: Andrzej Józef Kłopotowski
- Nationality: Polish
- Born: 9 August 1935 Warsaw, Poland
- Died: 12 February 2011 (aged 75) Karwik, Poland
- Height: 190 cm (6 ft 3 in)

Sport
- Sport: Swimming
Medal record
Representing Poland
Summer Universiade
Bronze medal – third place	1959 Turin	200m breaststroke

Andrzej Józef Kłopotowski (9 August 1935 – 12 February 2011) was a Polish breaststroke swimmer. He competed in the men's 200 metre breaststroke at the 1960 Summer Olympics.
