= Tony Williams (swimmer) =

Sri Lankan swimmer

Personal information
- Born: 28 October 1938 (age 87) London, England

Sport
- Sport: Swimming

Malcolm Anthony Williams (born 28 October 1938) is a Sri Lankan former swimmer. He competed in the men's 200 metre breaststroke at the 1960 Summer Olympics. Williams was eliminated in the heats of the 1958 British Empire and Commonwealth Games 220 yards breaststroke.
