= José Vicente León =

Spanish swimmer

Personal information
- Born: 17 November 1943 La Laguna, Spain
- Died: 20 December 1977 (aged 34) Igualada

Sport
- Sport: Swimming
Medal record
Representing Spain
Mediterranean Games
Bronze medal – third place	1959 Beirut	200m butterfly

José Vicente León (17 November 1943 – 20 December 1977) was a Spanish swimmer. He competed in the men's 200 metre butterfly at the 1960 Summer Olympics.
