= Arkadiy Holovchenko =

Ukrainian swimmer

Personal information
- Nationality: Ukrainian
- Born: 5 August 1936 Kirovohrad, Soviet Union
- Died: 30 November 2000 (aged 64)

Sport
- Sport: Swimming

Arkadiy Holovchenko (5 August 1936 – 30 November 2000) was a Ukrainian swimmer. He competed in the men's 200 metre breaststroke at the 1960 Summer Olympics for the Soviet Union.
