= Trương Kế Nhơn =

Vietnamese swimmer

Personal information
- Born: 1 January 1939 (age 87) Bạc Liêu, French Indochina

Sport
- Sport: Swimming
Medal record
Men's swimming
Representing Vietnam
Southeast Asian Peninsular Games
Gold medal – first place	1959 Bangkok	100 m breaststroke
Bronze medal – third place	1961 Rangoon	200 m breaststroke

Trương Kế Nhơn (born 1 January 1939) is a Vietnamese former swimmer. He competed in the men's 200 metre breaststroke at the 1960 Summer Olympics.
