= Henri Vidil =

French swimmer

Personal information
- Born: 28 May 1941 (age 85) Marseille, France

Sport
- Sport: Swimming

Henri Vidil (born 28 May 1941) is a French former swimmer. He competed in the men's 200 metre butterfly at the 1960 Summer Olympics.
