= Wieger Mensonides =

Dutch swimmer (born 1938)

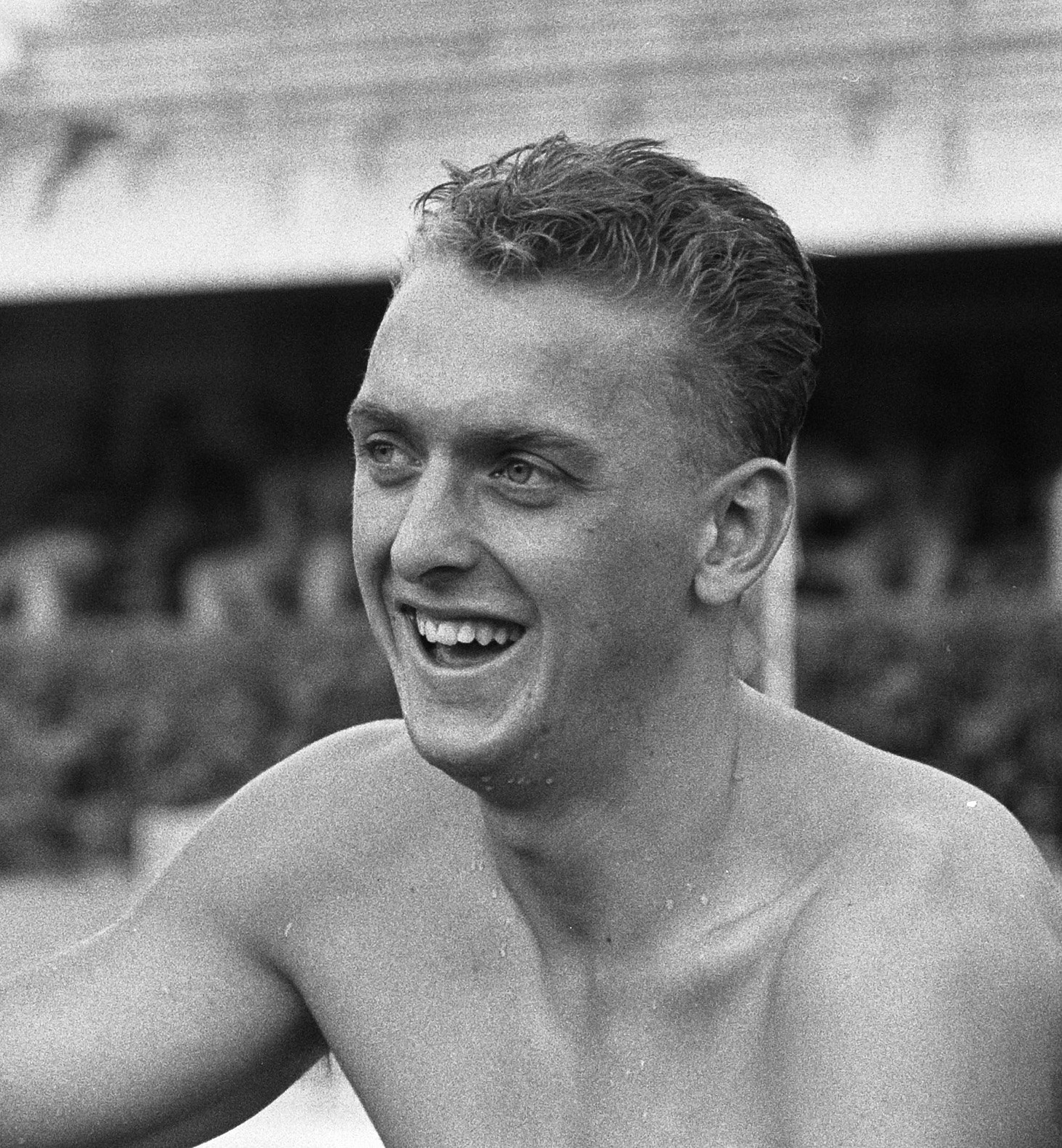
- Wieger Mensonides in 1960

Personal information
- Born: 12 July 1938 (age 87) The Hague, the Netherlands
- Height: 1.78 m (5 ft 10 in)
- Weight: 81 kg (179 lb)

Sport
- Sport: Swimming
- Club: HZ ZIAN, Den Haag
Medal record
Representing the Netherlands
Olympic Games
Bronze medal – third place	1960 Rome	200 m breaststroke
European Championships
Bronze medal – third place	1962 Leipzig	4×100 m medley

Wieger Emile Mensonides (born 12 July 1938) is a former Dutch swimmer, who won the bronze medal in the 200 m breaststroke at the 1960 Summer Olympics. For forty years he was the only Dutch male swimmer to have won an Olympic medal. Pieter van den Hoogenband followed in his footsteps at the 2000 Summer Olympics in Sydney.

Between 1959 and 1967 he won 9 national titles and set 13 national records in the 100 m and 200 m breaststroke.

After his active sports career, Mensonides continued his involvement with the sport by training swimmers, and he developed a swim analysis method with corresponding software. He also has a swim analysis website showcasing the software together with a blog about all technical aspects of swimming and swim analysis.

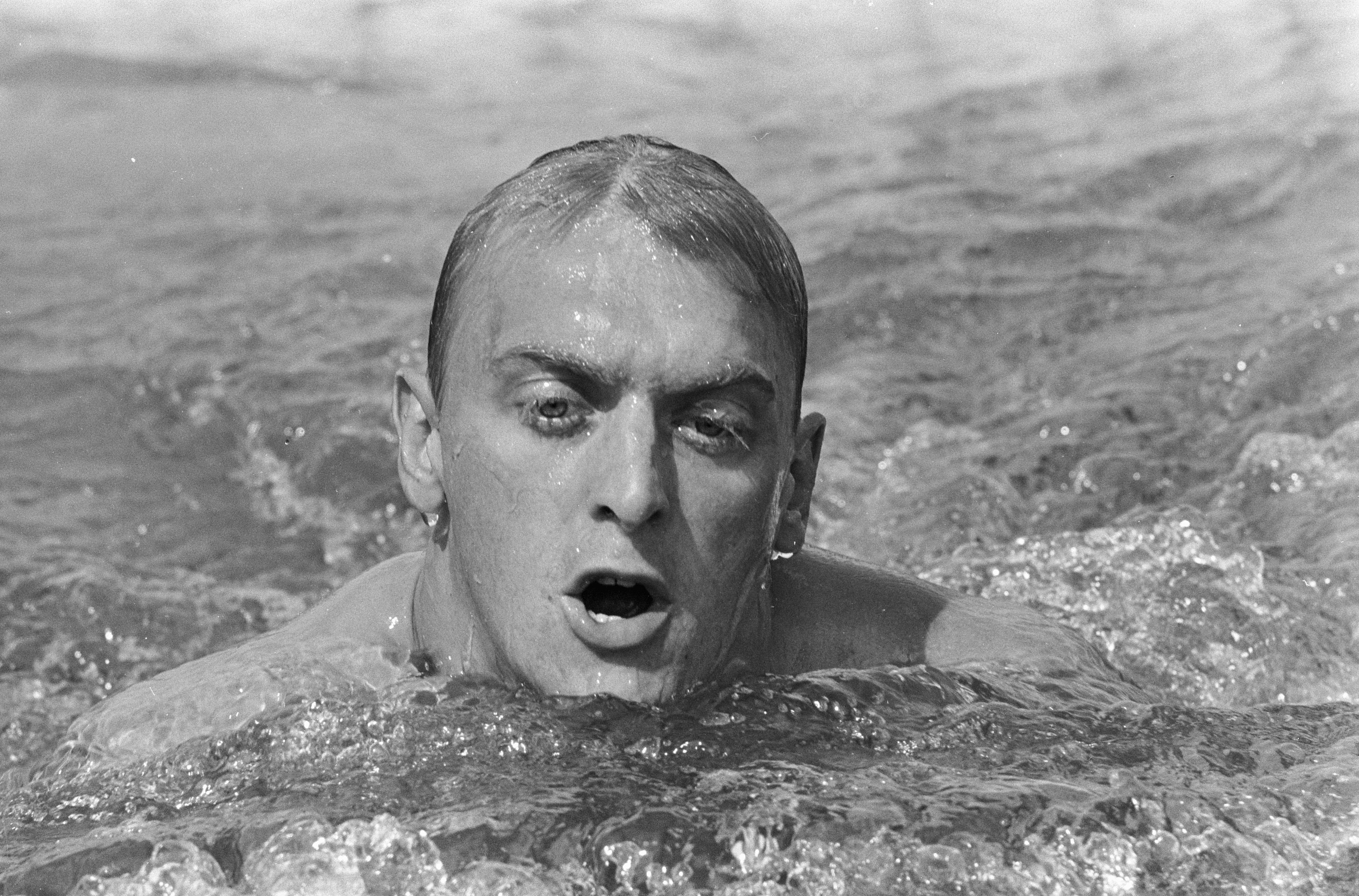
Mensonides in 1967
