= Hideo Ninomiya =

Japanese swimmer (born 1937)

Personal information
- Born: 28 November 1937 (age 88)

Sport
- Sport: Swimming
Medal record
Representing Japan
Asian Games
Silver medal – second place	1958 Tokyo	100m backstroke

Hideo Ninomiya (二宮 英雄, Ninomiya Hideo; born 28 November 1937) is a Japanese former swimmer. He competed in the men's 100 metre backstroke at the 1956 Summer Olympics.
