= Mihovil Dorčić =

Yugoslav swimmer (born 1938)

Personal information
- Born: 12 March 1938 (age 88) Baška, Yugoslavia

Sport
- Sport: Swimming
Medal record
Men's swimming
Representing Yugoslavia
Mediterranean Games
Silver medal – second place	1959 Beirut	100 m backstroke
Universiade
Bronze medal – third place	1959 Turin	100 m backstroke

Mihovil Dorčić (born 12 March 1938) is a Yugoslav former swimmer. He competed in two events at the 1960 Summer Olympics.
