= Gyula Dobay =

Hungarian swimmer (1937–2007)

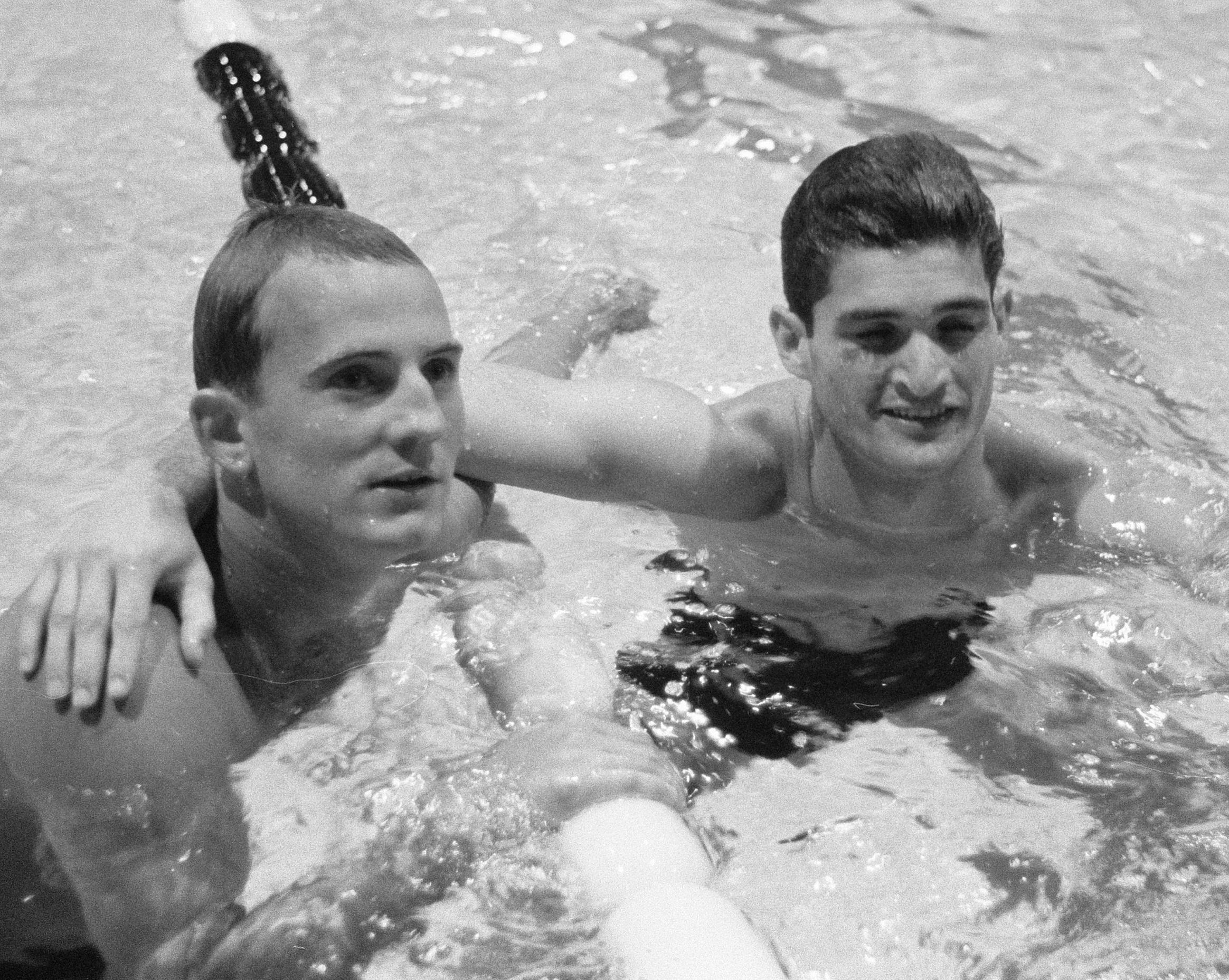
- Gyula Dobay (left) with Manoel dos Santos at the 1960 Olympics

Personal information
- Full name: Gyula Dobay
- Nationality: Hungarian
- Born: 18 November 1937 Szeged
- Died: 11 June 2007 (aged 69)
- Height: 1.83 m (6 ft 0 in)
- Weight: 75 kg (165 lb)

Sport
- Sport: Swimming
- Strokes: freestyle
- Club: Újpesti TE
Medal record
European Championships
Silver medal – second place	1958 Budapest	4×100 m medley
Bronze medal – third place	1958 Budapest	100 m freestyle
Bronze medal – third place	1958 Budapest	4×200 m freestyle

Gyula Dobay (18 November 1937 – 11 June 2007) was a freestyle swimmer from Hungary. He competed at the 1956, 1960 and 1964 Olympics in eight events in total with the best result of fifth place in the 100 m freestyle in 1960. At the European Championships he won one silver and two bronze medals, all in 1958.

After the 1956 Olympics, Dobay defected to the United States due to the Soviet invasion of Hungary. He stayed there for 16 months, but failed to find a stable job and returned to Hungary. After retiring from swimming he ran a sports shop in Budapest.
