= Isao Masuda =

Japanese swimmer

Personal information
- Born: 25 October 1937 (age 88) Tokyo, Japan

Sport
- Sport: Swimming

Isao Masuda (増田 勲, Masuda Isao; born 25 October 1937) is a Japanese former swimmer. He competed in the men's 200 metre breaststroke at the 1960 Summer Olympics.
