= Swimming at the 1959 Summer Universiade =

Swimming at the I Summer Universiade

The swimming competition at the 1959 Summer Universiade took place in Turin, Italy.

== Men’s events ==
Event	Gold		Silver		Bronze	
100 m freestyle	Igor Lushkovskiy (URS)	57.0	Andrzej Salamon (POL)	57.7	Paolo Pucci (ITA)	58.0
400 m freestyle	Igor Lushkovskiy (URS)	4:43.8	Ling (GDR)	4:46.5	Mario Liotti (ITA)	4:57.9
1500 m freestyle	Kadar (HUN)	19:55.7	Strasser (FRG)	20:07.0	José Cossio (ESP)	20:10.3
100 m backstroke	Gilberto Elsa (ITA)	1:05.7	Georgiy Kuvaldin (URS)	1:06.5	Mihovil Dorčić (YUG)	1:06.6
200 m breaststroke	Hans-Joachim Tröger (FRG)	2:42.9	Roberto Lazzari (ITA)	2:42.9	Andrzej Klopotowski (POL)	2:45.1
200 m butterfly	Fritz Dennerlein (ITA)	2:21.9	Grigoriy Kiselyov (URS)	2:25.1	Pavel Pazdírek (TCH)	2:25.2
4 × 200 m freestyle relay	Italy (ITA)	8:53.1	Hungary (HUN)	9:07.7	West Germany (FRG)	9:08.8
4 × 100 m medley relay	Italy (ITA)	4:20.4	Czechoslovakia (TCH)	4:27.6	West Germany (FRG)	4:28.5

== Women’s events ==
Event	Gold		Silver		Bronze	
100 m freestyle	N. Sacco (ITA)	1:09.7	Ludmila Kottková (TCH)	1:10.3	Koosje van Voorn (NED)	1:12.7
400 m freestyle	Ludmila Kottková (TCH)	5:33.3	Christine Gosden (GBR)	5:42.9	N. Sacco (ITA)	5:43.3
100 m backstroke	Rita Androsoni (ITA)	1:20.7	Tindall (GBR)	1:28.0	Bosch (FRG)	1:28.8
200 m breaststroke	Christine Gosden (GBR)	2:59.2	Alessandra Salvi (ITA)	3:08.2	Schiemenz (FRG)	3:21.1
100 m butterfly	Valentina Pozdnyak (URS)	1:13.9	Christine Gosden (GBR)	1:14.6	Cornelia Hruska (ITA)	1:28.1
4 × 100 m freestyle relay	Great Britain (GBR)	4:54.9	West Germany (FRG)	5:02.9	Italy (ITA)	5:06.4
4 × 100 m medley relay	Italy (ITA)	5:25.5	Great Britain (GBR)	5:32.8	West Germany (FRG)	5:47.4

== Medal table ==
Rank	Nation	Gold	Silver	Bronze	Total
1	Italy (ITA)	7	2	5	14
2	Soviet Union (URS)	3	2	0	5
3	Great Britain (GBR)	2	4	0	6
4	West Germany (FRG)	1	2	5	8
5	Czechoslovakia (TCH)	1	2	1	4
6	Hungary (HUN)	1	1	0	2
7	Poland (POL)	0	1	1	2
8	East Germany (GDR)	0	1	0	1
9	Netherlands (NED)	0	0	1	1
9	Spain (ESP)	0	0	1	1
9	Yugoslavia (YUG)	0	0	1	1
Totals (11 entries)		15	15	15	45
