= Werner Risi =

Swiss swimmer

Personal information
- Born: 15 July 1940 (age 85) Basel, Switzerland

Sport
- Sport: Swimming

Werner Risi (born 15 July 1940) is a Swiss former swimmer. He competed in the men's 200 metre breaststroke at the 1960 Summer Olympics.
