= Ekkehard Miersch =

German swimmer

Personal information
- Nationality: German
- Born: 4 May 1936 (age 90) Potsdam, Germany

Sport
- Sport: Swimming

Ekkehard Miersch (born 4 May 1936) is a German former swimmer. He competed in the men's 100 metre backstroke at the 1956 Summer Olympics.
