= Judith de Nijs =

Dutch swimmer (born 1942)

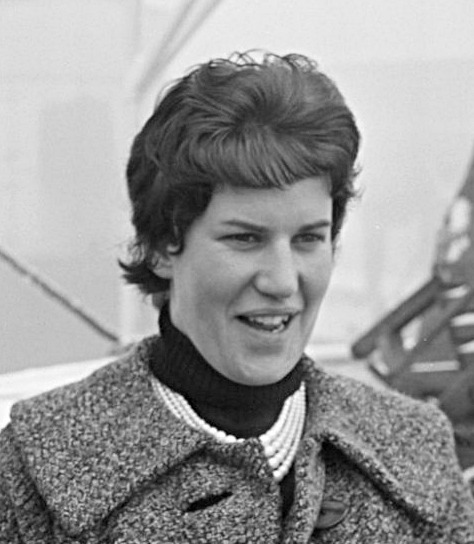
- Judith de Nijs in 1963

Personal information
- Born: April 22, 1942 (age 84) Hilversum, Netherlands

Sport
- Sport: Swimming
- Strokes: Medley, marathon swimming
- Coach: Jan Stender

Judith de Nijs (sometimes spelled de Nys; born 22 April 1942) is a Dutch swimmer. After setting a European record in the 400 m medley event in 1961 she shifted to marathon swimming and was ranked world No. 1 in 1964–1968 and 1970. For her achievements she was inducted into the International Marathon Swimming Hall of Fame.

== Biography ==
Judith de Nijs was born in Hilversum. Together with her elder sister Lenie she trained under the famous Dutch coach Jan Stender, and both became record-breaking swimmers. Judith first specialized in the 400 m medley and set a European record in this event in 1961. She then shifted to longer distances and become the national champion in the 1500 m freestyle in 1962.

Since about 1962 she started competing in marathon swimming. This way, she became a professional swimmer and earned prize money for the races she won. From 1964, when the point system was introduced to marathon swimming, to 1968, as well as in 1970, she was ranked world No. 1. In 1969, she became the second Dutch woman (after Mary Kok) to swim across the English Channel.

On 17 January 1968 de Nijs married the water polo player Bob van Berkel and changed her name to Judith van Berkel-de Nijs. They have a daughter and a son, water polo player Robert van Berkel. She remained a competitive swimmer through the 1980s–2000s, winning national titles in senior categories in 1988–2001, 2005, 2007 and 2009 (3–4 km freestyle).

== International competitions ==
- 1964 49.8 km (31 mile) Lake Ontario swim, Canada – 1st
- 1965 30.5 km (19 mile) Lake Ohrid race, Macedonia – 1st, 8h05min
- 1965 32 km (20 mile) Maratona del Golfo – Capri Napoli, Italy – 1 st, 7h04min
- 1965 40 km (25 mile) Alexandrium race, the Suez Canal – 1st, 10h24min
- 1966 40 km (25 mile) Traversée internationale du Lac St-Jean, Canada – 1st, 8h38min (race record)
- 1968 24-hour La Tuque Relay, Canada – 3rd
- 1967 32 km (20 mile) Maratona del Golfo – Capri Napoli, Italy – 1st, 8h35min
- 1967 16 km (10 mile) Hamilton race, Canada – 1st, 4h45min
- 1968 24-hour La Tuque Relay, Canada – 1st

Note, that in the 1960s, women and men competed together in marathon races.

== Bibliography ==
- Wennerberg, Conrad (1 January 1999). Wind, Waves, and Sunburn: A Brief History of Marathon Swimming. Breakaway Books. ISBN 978-1-55821-615-0.
