= Mihai Mitrofan =

Romanian swimmer

Personal information
- Nationality: Romanian
- Born: 9 February 1931 Bucharest, Romania
- Died: 23 January 2012 (aged 80) Brasov, Romania

Sport
- Sport: Swimming

Mihai Mitrofan (9 February 1931 – 23 January 2012) was a Romanian breaststroke swimmer. He competed in the men's 200 meter breaststroke at the 1960 Summer Olympics.
