= Ahiron Radjae =

Filipino swimmer

Personal information
- Born: 12 March 1943 (age 83) Bualuh, Philippines

Sport
- Sport: Swimming

Ahiron Radjae (born 12 March 1943) is a Filipino former swimmer. He competed in the men's 200 metre butterfly at the 1960 Summer Olympics.
