= Heriberto de la Fe =

Spanish swimmer

Personal information
- Born: 20 July 1941 (age 85) Las Palmas, Spain

Sport
- Sport: Swimming

Heriberto de la Fe (born 20 July 1941) is a Spanish former swimmer. He competed in the men's 200 metre butterfly at the 1960 Summer Olympics.
