= Erny Schweitzer =

Luxembourgish swimmer (born 1939)

Personal information
- Born: 13 April 1939 (age 87) Ettelbruck, Luxembourg

Sport
- Sport: Swimming

Erny Schweitzer (born 13 April 1939) is a Luxembourgish former swimmer. He competed in the men's 200 metre breaststroke at the 1960 Summer Olympics.
