= José Cossio =

Spanish swimmer (born 1942)

Personal information
- Born: 4 November 1942 (age 83) Las Palmas, Spain

Sport
- Sport: Swimming
Medal record
Representing Spain
Summer Universiade
Bronze medal – third place	1959 Turin	1500m freestyle

José Cossio (born 4 November 1942) is a Spanish former swimmer. He competed in the men's 400 metre freestyle at the 1960 Summer Olympics.
