= György Müller =

Hungarian swimmer

Personal information
- Born: 6 May 1938 Újpest, Hungary
- Died: 7 February 2003 (aged 64)
- Height: 1.87 m (6 ft 2 in)
- Weight: 78 kg (172 lb)

Sport
- Sport: Swimming
- Club: Újpesti TE
Medal record
Representing Hungary
European Championships
Bronze medal – third place	1958 Budapest	4×200 m freestyle

György Müller (6 May 1938 – 7 February 2003) was a Hungarian swimmer who won a bronze medal in the 4×200 m freestyle relay at the 1958 European Aquatics Championships. He competed in the same event at the 1960 Summer Olympics, but his team did not reach the finals.
