= Leonid Barbier =

Ukrainian swimmer (1937–2023)

Personal information
- Born: 9 April 1937 Kyiv, Ukrainian SSR, USSR
- Died: 15 January 2023 (aged 85)
- Height: 1.80 m (5 ft 11 in)
- Weight: 73 kg (161 lb)

Sport
- Sport: Swimming
Medal record
Representing the Soviet Union
European Championships
Gold medal – first place	1958 Budapest	4×100 m medley
Silver medal – second place	1958 Budapest	100 m backstroke
Gold medal – first place	1962 Leipzig	200 m backstroke

Leonid Faivelevych Barbier (Ukrainian: Леонід Файвелевич Барбієр, Russian: Леонид Файвелевич Барбиер; 9 April 1937 – 15 January 2023) was a Ukrainian swimmer. He competed at the 1960 Summer Olympics in the 100 m backstroke and 4 × 100 m medley relay and finished in fifth place in both events. He won two European titles in 1958 and 1962.

During his career he set six European records: four in individual backstroke events and two in the medley relay, as well as 15 national records. Around 1989 he was active in masters swimming, winning three European and national titles. In 1989 he also briefly acted as president of the Moscow federation of masters swimming. His wife is a famous swimming coach.

Barbier died on 15 January 2023, at the age of 85.
