= Guillermo Alsina =

Spanish swimmer

Personal information
- Full name: Guillermo Alsina Soto
- Nationality: Spanish
- Born: 26 April 1938 (age 88) Barcelona, Spain

Sport
- Sport: Swimming

Guillermo Alsina Soto (born 26 April 1938) is a Spanish former swimmer. He competed in the men's 200 metre breaststroke at the 1960 Summer Olympics.
