= Gilberto Elsa =

Italian swimmer (1938–1985)

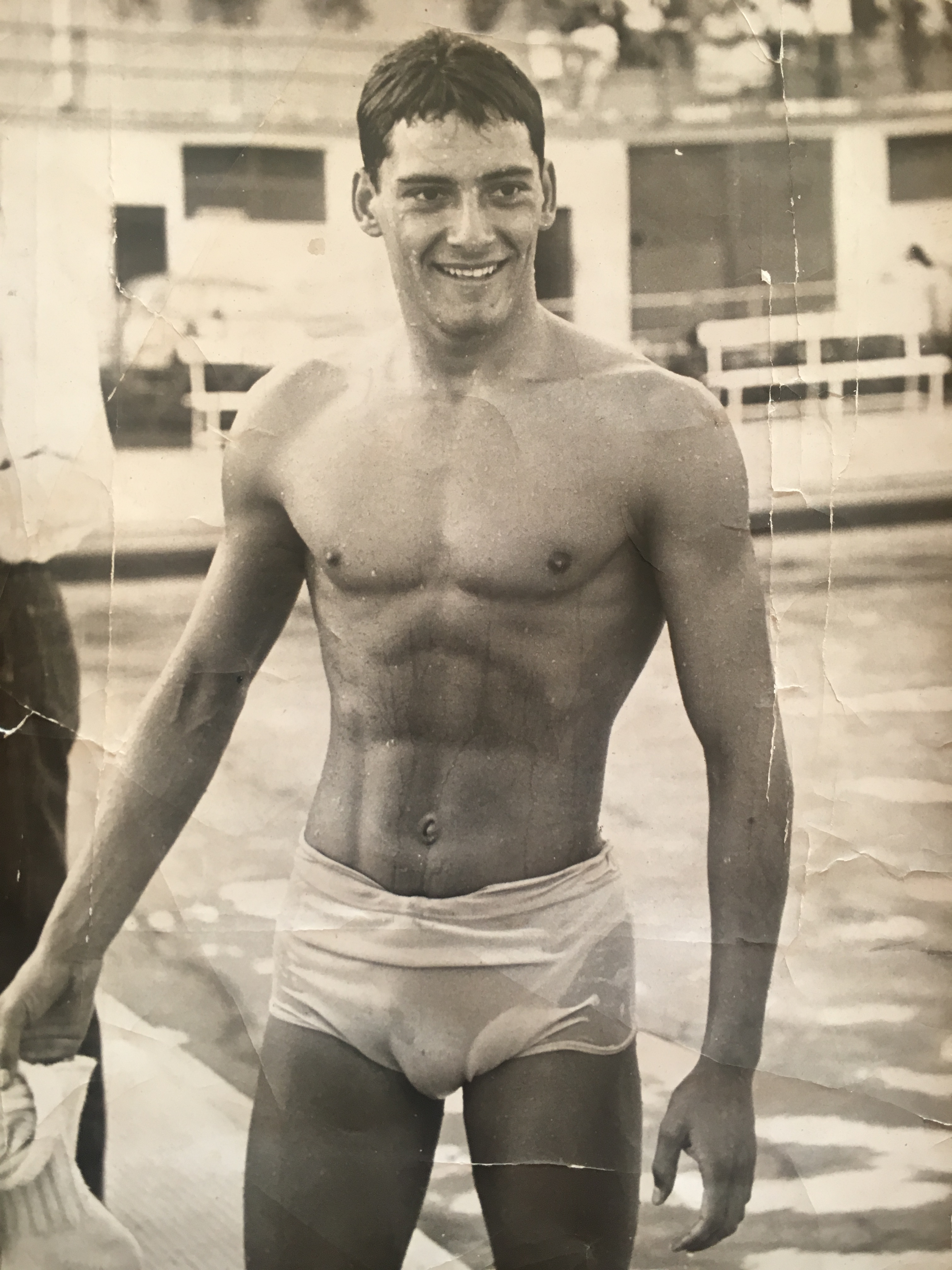

Personal information
- Born: 14 January 1938 Lecco, Italy
- Died: 2 June 1985 (aged 47)
- Height: 1.78 m (5 ft 10 in)
- Weight: 68 kg (150 lb)
Medal record
Men's swimming
Representing Italy
European Championships
Bronze medal – third place	1958 Budapest	4×100 m medley
Universiade
Gold medal – first place	1959 Turin	100 m backstroke
Gold medal – first place	1959 Turin	4×100 m medley

Gilberto Elsa (14 January 1938 – 2 June 1985) was an Italian swimmer who won a bronze medal in the 4×100 m medley relay at the 1958 European Aquatics Championships. He also competed at the 1960 Summer Olympics in the 100 m backstroke event, but did not reach the finals.
