= Gerald Brauner =

Austrian swimmer

Personal information
- Full name: Gerald Brauner

Sport
- Sport: Swimming

Gerald Brauner is an Austrian former swimmer. He competed in the men's 200 metre breaststroke at the 1960 Summer Olympics.
