= René Pirolley =

French swimmer (1931–2013)

Personal information
- Nationality: French
- Born: 17 October 1931 Paris, France
- Died: 26 March 2013 (aged 81) Antibes, France

Sport
- Sport: Swimming
Medal record
Representing France
Mediterranean Games
Silver medal – second place	1959 Naples	200m butterfly

René Pirolley (17 October 1931 – 26 March 2013) was a French backstroke and butterfly swimmer. He competed at the 1948 Summer Olympics and the 1956 Summer Olympics.
