= Viktor Konoplyov =

Soviet swimmer (born 1938)

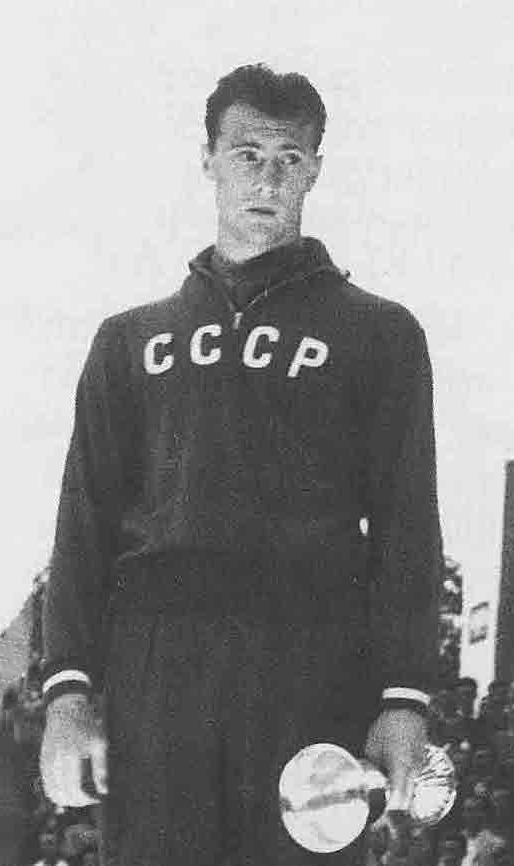
- Viktor Polevoy at the 1958 European Championships

Personal information
- Born: 1 June 1938 (age 88) Moscow, Soviet Union

Sport
- Sport: Swimming
- Club: Dynamo Moscow
Medal record
Representing the Soviet Union
European Championships
Gold medal – first place	1958 Budapest	4×100 m medley
Silver medal – second place	1958 Budapest	100 m freestyle
Silver medal – second place	1962 Leipzig	4×100 m medley

Viktor Konoplyov (Polevoy) (Russian: Виктор Коноплёв (Полевой); born 1 June 1938) is a retired Soviet freestyle swimmer who won a gold and a silver medal in the 4×100 m medley relay at the European championships of 1958 and 1962. Between 1958 and 1962 he set four European records in the 4×100 m medley and freestyle relays. He won the national titles in the 100 m freestyle (1961–1963) and 4×100 m medley (1960).

He graduated from the State Central Order of Lenin Institute of Physical Education in Moscow, and after retirement worked as a national swimming coach and associated professor at various universities. He was one of the first Soviet swimmers to develop an optimal turning technique in freestyle. He holds a PhD in pedagogy and was awarded the Medal "Veteran of Labour".
