= Vítězslav Svozil =

Czech swimmer

Personal information
- Born: 9 April 1933 (age 93) Olomouc, Czechoslovakia

Sport
- Sport: Swimming

Vítězslav Svozil (born 9 April 1933) is a Czech former swimmer. He competed in the men's 200 metre breaststroke at the 1960 Summer Olympics.
