= Giorgio Perondini =

Italian swimmer

Personal information
- Born: 3 October 1937 (age 88) Venice, Italy
- Height: 181 cm (5 ft 11 in)
- Weight: 72 kg (159 lb; 11 st 5 lb)

Sport
- Country: Italy
- Sport: Swimming
- Events: Freestyle; Backstroke
Medal record
Representing Italy
Mediterranean Games
Gold medal – first place	1959 Beirut	4x200m freestyle relay

Giorgio Perondini (born 3 October 1937) is an Italian swimmer who was on the Italian Olympic Team in the 1956 Summer Olympics in Melbourne and the 1960 Summer Olympics in Rome.

== Early life and swimming career ==
Perondini was born in Venice and learned to swim in its canals. He and his brother rose to national championship levels in teenage categories. He, his brother, and his mother moved to Turin after World War II, when Perondini was offered a place on the FIAT Torino swimming team and a place of work as a factory labourer. He trained and competed with FIAT Torino, undertook his working duties, and studied for a degree by night.

At the 1956 Olympics, he was on the 4 × 200 metres freestyle relay team as an alternate. The Italian team would finish 7th in the finals. In the 1960 Olympics, he competed in the 100m freestyle. He finished in 30th position.

As of July 2021, he holds Italian records for freestyle and backstroke in various age categories at the Masters level. In July 2021, he won the Italian championships in both those disciplines.

== Personal life ==
After competing in the Olympics, he rose through the ranks within Fiat, becoming a director of the company.

He lives with his wife Jane in the outskirts of Turin, Italy.
