= Jürgen Bachmann =

German swimmer (born 1942)

Personal information
- Born: 20 January 1942 (age 84) Berlin, Germany
- Height: 1.82 m (6 ft 0 in)
- Weight: 77 kg (170 lb)

Sport
- Sport: Swimming
- Club: SC Einheit Berlin, Ost Berlin
Medal record
Men's swimming
Representing East Germany
European Championships
Bronze medal – third place	1962 Leipzig	400 m medley

Jürgen Bachmann (born 20 January 1942) is a German retired swimmer who won a bronze medal in the 400 medley event at the 1962 European Aquatics Championships. He also competed in the 200 m butterfly at the 1960 Summer Olympics but was eliminated in preliminaries.
