= Vitaliy Chenenkov =

Soviet swimmer

Personal information
- Born: 1938 (age 87–88) Baku, Azerbaijan

Sport
- Sport: Swimming
- Club: Burevestnik
Medal record
Representing Soviet Union
European Championships
Gold medal – first place	1958 Budapest	4×100 m medley

Vitaliy Chenenkov (Russian: Виталий Жененков; born 1938) is a retired Soviet swimmer who won a gold medal in the 4×100 m medley relay at the 1958 European Aquatics Championships. During his career he set one European (1958, 4×100 m medley) and three national records (1958–1959, 100 m and 200 butterfly).
