= Robert Christophe =

French swimmer (1938–2016)

Personal information
- Full name: Robert François René Christophe
- Born: 22 February 1938 Marseille, France
- Died: 18 April 2016 (aged 78) Morières-lès-Avignon, France

Sport
- Sport: Swimming
- Strokes: Backstroke
Medal record
Men's swimming
Representing France
European Championships (LC)
Gold medal – first place	1958 Budapest	100 m backstroke
Gold medal – first place	1962 Leipzig	4×100 m freestyle
Silver medal – second place	1962 Leipzig	4×200 m freestyle
Mediterranean Games
Gold medal – first place	1959 Beirut	100 m backstroke

Robert Christophe (22 February 1938 – 18 April 2016) was a French swimmer who competed in the 1956, 1960, and 1964 Summer Olympics. He was born in Marseille.
