= 1958 European Aquatics Championships =

Water sport competitions

9th European Aquatics Championships
- Host city: Budapest
- Country: Hungary
- Events: 20
- Opening: 31 August 1958
- Closing: 6 September 1958

The 1958 LEN European Aquatics Championships took place in Budapest, Hungary from 31 August until 6 September. In swimming, the 4 × 100 m medley relays for men and women were introduced.

== Medal table ==
* Host nation (Hungary)

Rank	Nation	Gold	Silver	Bronze	Total
1	Soviet Union	5	6	5	16
2	Great Britain	5	4	4	13
3	Netherlands	5	3	0	8
4	Hungary*	2	2	3	7
5	Italy	1	2	2	5
6	Sweden	1	0	2	3
7	France	1	0	0	1
8	West Germany	0	1	2	3
9	Czechoslovakia	0	1	1	2
10	Yugoslavia	0	1	0	1
11	East Germany	0	0	1	1
Totals (11 entries)		20	20	20	60

== Medal summary ==
=== Diving ===
Men's events

Event	Gold		Silver		Bronze	
3 m springboard	László Újvári; Hungary	141.17	Horst Rosenfeldt; West Germany	139.77	Roman Brener; Soviet Union	139.39
10 m platform	Brian Phelps; Great Britain	143.74	Mikhail Chachba; Soviet Union	136.87	Jenõ Marton; Hungary	134.68

Women's events

Event	Gold		Silver		Bronze	
3 m springboard	Ninel Krutova; Soviet Union	124.22	Charmain Welsh; Great Britain	123.32	Valentina Dedova; Soviet Union	122.75
10 m platform	Aldona Kareckaité; Soviet Union	81.14	Raisa Gorokhovskaya; Soviet Union	80.93	Birte Hanson; Sweden	80.34

=== Swimming ===
==== Men's events ====
Event	Gold		Silver		Bronze	
100 m freestyle	Paolo Pucci; Italy	56.3	Viktor Polevoy; Soviet Union	56.9	Gyula Dobai; Hungary	57.5
400 m freestyle	Ian Black; Great Britain	4:31.3	Boris Nikitin; Soviet Union	4:36.2	Paolo Galletti; Italy	4:38.1
1500 m freestyle	Ian Black; Great Britain	18:05.8	József Katona; Hungary	18:13.0	Gennady Androsov; Soviet Union	18:30.2
100 m backstroke	Robert Christophe; France	1:03.1	Leonid Barbier; Soviet Union	1:03.9	Wolfgang Wagner; East Germany	1:05.5
200 m breaststroke	Leonid Kolesnikov; Soviet Union	2:41.1	Roberto Lazzari; Italy	2:41.3	Klaus Bodinger; West Germany	2:41.4
200 m butterfly	Ian Black; Great Britain	2:21.9	Pavel Pazdírek; Czechoslovakia	2:22.6	Graham Symonds; Great Britain	2:25.8
4 × 200 m freestyle relay	Soviet Union; Gennady Nikolayev; Vladimir Struzhanov; Igor Luzhkovsky; Boris Nikitin	8:33.7	Italy; Frederico Dennerlein; Paolo Galletti; Angelo Romani; Paolo Pucci	8:41.2	Hungary; József Katona; Imre Nyéki; György Muller; Gyula Dobai	8:45.3
4 × 100 m medley relay	Soviet Union; Leonid Barbier; Vladimir Minachkin; Vitaliy Chenenkov; Viktor Polevoy	4:16.5	Hungary; László Magyar; György Kunsági; György Tumpek; Gyula Dobai	4:20.4	Italy; Gilberto Elsa; Roberto Lazzari; Frederico Dennerlein; Paolo Pucci	4:21.9

==== Women's events ====
Event	Gold		Silver		Bronze	
100 m freestyle	Kate Jobson; Sweden	1:04.7	Cocky Gastelaars; Netherlands	1:05.0	Judy Grinham; Great Britain	1:05.4
400 m freestyle	Jans Koster; Netherlands	5:02.6	Corrie Schimmel; Netherlands	5:02.6	Nancy Rae; Great Britain	5:07.7
100 m backstroke	Judy Grinham; Great Britain	1:12.6	Margaret Edwards; Great Britain	1:12.9	Larisa Viktorova; Soviet Union	1:13.9
200 m breaststroke	Ada den Haan; Netherlands	2:52.0	Anita Lonsbrough; Great Britain	2:53.5	Wiltrud Urselman; West Germany	2:53.8
100 m butterfly	Tineke Lagerberg; Netherlands	1:11.9	Atie Voorbij; Netherlands	1:12.2	Marta Skupilova; Czechoslovakia	1:14.3
4 × 100 m freestyle relay	Netherlands; Corrie Schimmel; Tineke Lagerberg; Greetje Kraan; Cocky Gastelaars	4:22.9	Great Britain; Judy Grinham; Elspeth Ferguson; Judith Samuel; Diana Wilkinson	4:24.2	Sweden; Birgitta Eriksson; Karin Larsson; Barbro Andersson; Kate Jobson	4:28.5
4 × 100 m medley relay	Netherlands; Lenie de Nijs; Ada den Haan; Atie Voorbij; Cocky Gastelaars	4:52.9	Soviet Union; Larisa Viktorova; Eve Uusmees; Galina Kamaeva; Ulvi Voog	4:54.2	Great Britain; Judy Grinham; Anita Lonsbrough; Christine Gosden; Diana Wilkinson	4:54.3

=== Water polo ===
Event	Gold	Silver	Bronze
Men's tournament	Hungary	Yugoslavia	Soviet Union

== See also ==
- List of European Championships records in swimming
