= Ohio Street Beach =

Beach in Chicago, Illinois, U.S.

- Beach
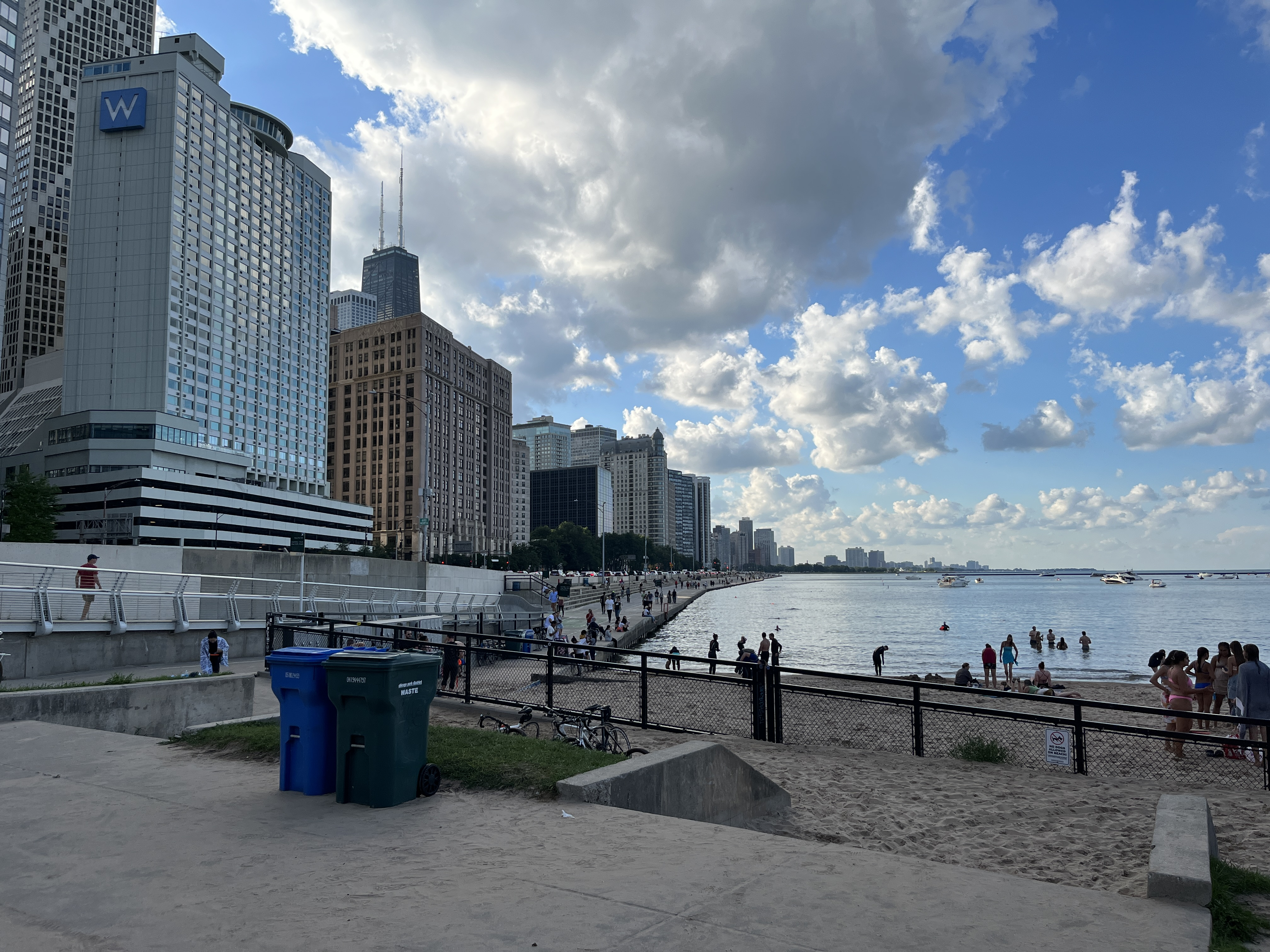
- The beach in 2023

- Coordinates: 41°53′36″N 87°36′46″W
- Location: Chicago, Illinois, U.S.

Ohio Street Beach is an urban beach in Chicago, in the U.S. state of Illinois. It faces north.

In Lonely Planet's 2022 list of the nine "best beaches in Chicago for a taste of the lake life", Ximena N. Beltran Quan Kiu said Ohio Street Beach was the city's best for swimming.
