= Horst Weber =

German swimmer

Personal information
- Born: 20 August 1939
- Died: 2002 (aged 62–63)

Sport
- Sport: Swimming

Horst Weber (20 August 1939 – 2002) was a German swimmer. He competed in the men's 200 metre butterfly at the 1956 Summer Olympics.
