= Lamberto Mari =

Italian diver (1933–2025)

Personal information
- Nationality: Italian
- Born: 7 September 1933 Florence, Kingdom of Italy
- Died: 22 September 2025 (aged 92)

Sport
- Sport: Diving

Lamberto Mari (7 September 1933 – 22 September 2025) was an Italian diver. He competed at the 1952 Summer Olympics and the 1960 Summer Olympics.

Mari died on 22 September 2025, at the age of 92.
