= Gilbert Desmit =

Belgian swimmer

Personal information
- Born: 21 September 1937 (age 88) Bruges, Belgium

Sport
- Sport: Swimming

Gilbert Desmit (born 21 September 1937) is a Belgian former breaststroke swimmer. He competed at the 1956 Summer Olympics and the 1960 Summer Olympics.
