= Dieter Pfeifer =

German swimmer

Personal information
- Born: 28 November 1936 (age 89) Chemnitz, Germany

Sport
- Sport: Swimming

Dieter Pfeifer (born 28 November 1936) is a German former swimmer. He competed at the 1956 Summer Olympics and the 1964 Summer Olympics.
