= Cocky Gastelaars =

Dutch swimmer (born 1938)

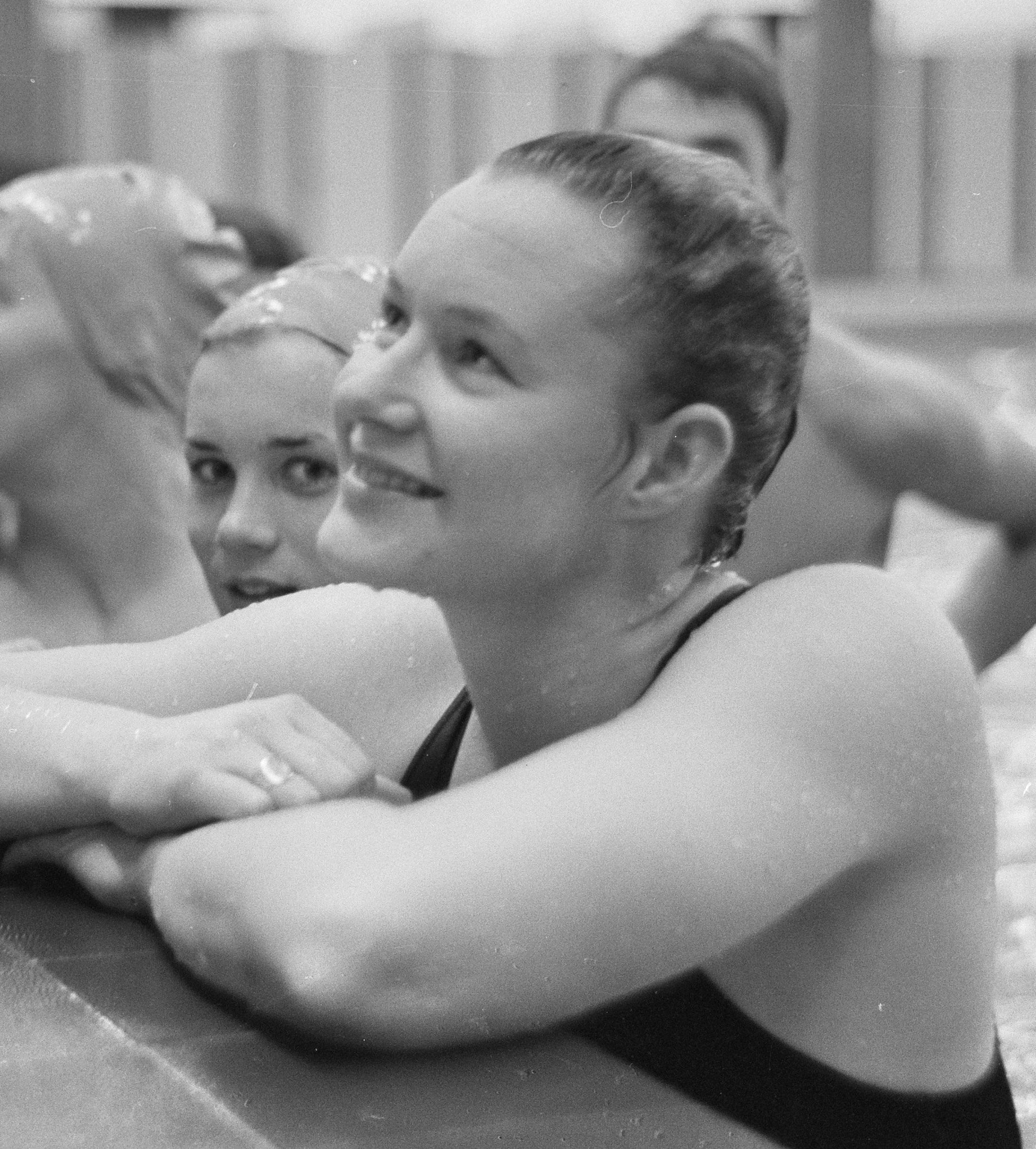
- Cocky Gastelaars in 1961

Medal record

Representing Netherlands

Women's Swimming

European Championships (LC)
Gold medal – first place	1958 Budapest	4×100 m freestyle
Gold medal – first place	1958 Budapest	4×100 m medley
Silver medal – second place	1958 Budapest	100 m freestyle
Gold medal – first place	1962 Leipzig	4×100 m freestyle

Cornelia Maria (Cocky) van Engelsdorp-Gastelaars (born 24 February 1938, Rotterdam) is a Dutch former swimmer who twice improved the world record in the women's 100 metre freestyle in 1956.

On March 3, 1956, in Amsterdam she broke the 20-year-old record of 1:04.6 by Willy den Ouden, who like Gastelaars, was born and raised in Rotterdam. Only later it turned out that her time of 1:04.2 was an improvement on Dawn Fraser race in 1:04.5 in Sydney the previous week. On April 14 Gastelaars lowered the record to 1:04.0 in her home base swimming pool in Schiedam. The decision by the Dutch Olympic Committee to boycott the Olympics in Melbourne that same year in protest of the Soviet invasion of Hungary caused her to miss out on a likely medal in the 100m individual freestyle and the 4 × 100 m relays.

She did compete in the 1960 Summer Olympics, but was past her prime at that point and finished seventh in 100m freestyle.

== See also ==
- World record progression 100 metres freestyle

Records
Preceded by Dawn Fraser	Women's 100 metre freestyle world record holder (long course); 3 March 1956 – 25 August 1956	Succeeded by Dawn Fraser
