= Wolfgang Sieber =

German swimmer

Personal information
- Born: 3 September 1937 (age 88) Saalfeld, Germany
- Height: 1.71 m (5 ft 7 in)
- Weight: 60 kg (130 lb)

Sport
- Sport: Swimming
- Club: SC Rotation Leipzig, Leipzig
Medal record
Men's swimming
Representing East Germany
European Championships
Bronze medal – third place	1962 Leipzig	200 m butterfly

Wolfgang Sieber (born 3 September 1937) is a retired German swimmer who won a bronze medal in the 200 m butterfly at the 1962 European Aquatics Championships. He also competed at the 1960 Summer Olympics in the same event, but was eliminated in the preliminaries.
