= Konrad Enke =

German swimmer

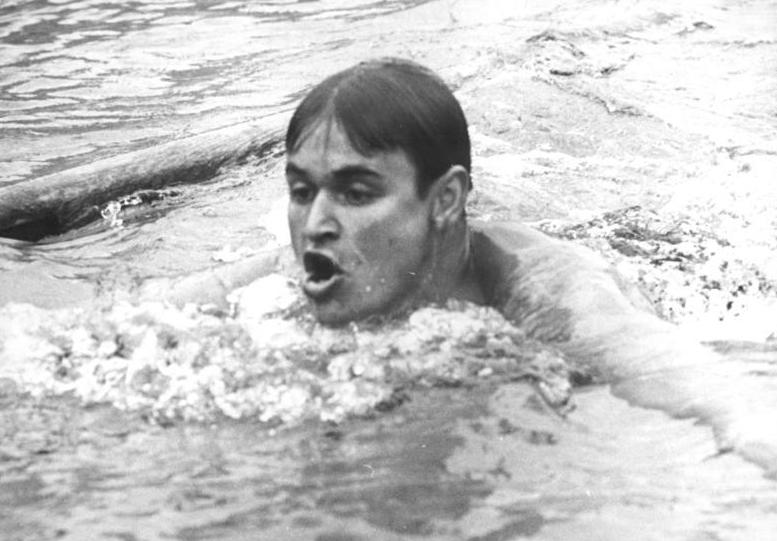
- Konrad Enke in 1956

Personal information
- Born: 23 July 1934 Pößneck, Germany
- Died: 13 November 2016 (aged 82)
- Height: 1.71 m (5 ft 7 in)
- Weight: 73 kg (161 lb)

Sport
- Sport: Swimming
- Club: SC Rotation Leipzig

Konrad Enke (23 July 1934 – 13 November 2016) was a German swimmer who specialized in the 200 m breaststroke event. After winning five national titles in 1954–1955 and 1957–1959 he set a new European record at 2:38.4 in 1959. The next year he competed at the 1960 Summer Olympics, but failed to reach the final.
