= Fritz Dennerlein =

Italian swimmer and water polo player

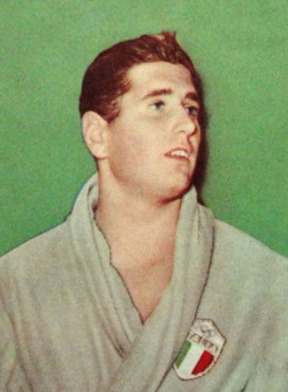

Personal information
- Born: 14 March 1936 Portici, Naples, Italy
- Died: 3 October 1992 (aged 56) Naples, Italy
- Height: 1.85 m (6 ft 1 in)
- Weight: 92 kg (203 lb)

Sport
- Sport: Swimming, water polo
- Club: Circolo Canottieri, Naples
Medal record
Representing Italy
Men's swimming
European Championships (LC)
Silver medal – second place	1958 Budapest	4×200 m freestyle
Bronze medal – third place	1958 Budapest	4×100 m medley
Mediterranean Games
Gold medal – first place	1959 Beirut	200 m butterfly
Gold medal – first place	1959 Beirut	4×100 m medley
Gold medal – first place	1959 Beirut	4×200 m freestyle
Gold medal – first place	1963 Naples	200 m butterfly
Universiade
Gold medal – first place	1959 Turin	200 m butterfly
Gold medal – first place	1959 Turin	4×200 m freestyle
Gold medal – first place	1959 Turin	4×100 m medley
Silver medal – second place	1963 Porto Alegre	200 m butterfly
Silver medal – second place	1963 Porto Alegre	4×100 m medley
Bronze medal – third place	1963 Porto Alegre	4×100 m freestyle
Men's water polo
Mediterranean Games
Gold medal – first place	1955 Barcelona	Team
Gold medal – first place	1963 Naples	Team
Silver medal – second place	1959 Beirut	Team
Universiade
Bronze medal – third place	1959 Turin	Team

Federico "Fritz" Dennerlein (14 March 1936 – 3 October 1992) was an Italian freestyle and butterfly swimmer and water polo player who competed in the 1956, 1960 and 1964 Summer Olympics. He finished fourth in the water polo tournaments in 1956 and 1964, and in the 200 m butterfly event in 1960. He also reached the finals of the 4 × 200 m freestyle (1956) and 4 × 100 m medley (1960) relays.

Dennerlein was born to a German father and Romanian mother; he had an elder brother Costantino, also a competitive swimmer. Between 1959 and 1962 he set five European records in the 100 and 200 m butterfly events. He aimed for a butterfly medal at the 1960 Olympics, and therefore gave up his place in the Olympic water polo team. After retiring from competitions he worked as a coach in his native Naples. Since 1984 he trained the national water polo team, bringing it to a silver medal at the 1986 World Championships. He died in a traffic accident, and was buried in the English Cemetery, Naples.
