= Ladislav Bačík =

Slovak swimmer

Personal information
- Born: 24 July 1933 Piešťany, Czechoslovakia
- Died: 6 January 2016 (aged 82)

Sport
- Sport: Swimming

Ladislav Bačík (24 July 1933 – 6 January 2016) was a Slovak swimmer. He competed at the 1952 Summer Olympics and the 1956 Summer Olympics.
