= Mary Kok =

Dutch swimmer (born 1940)

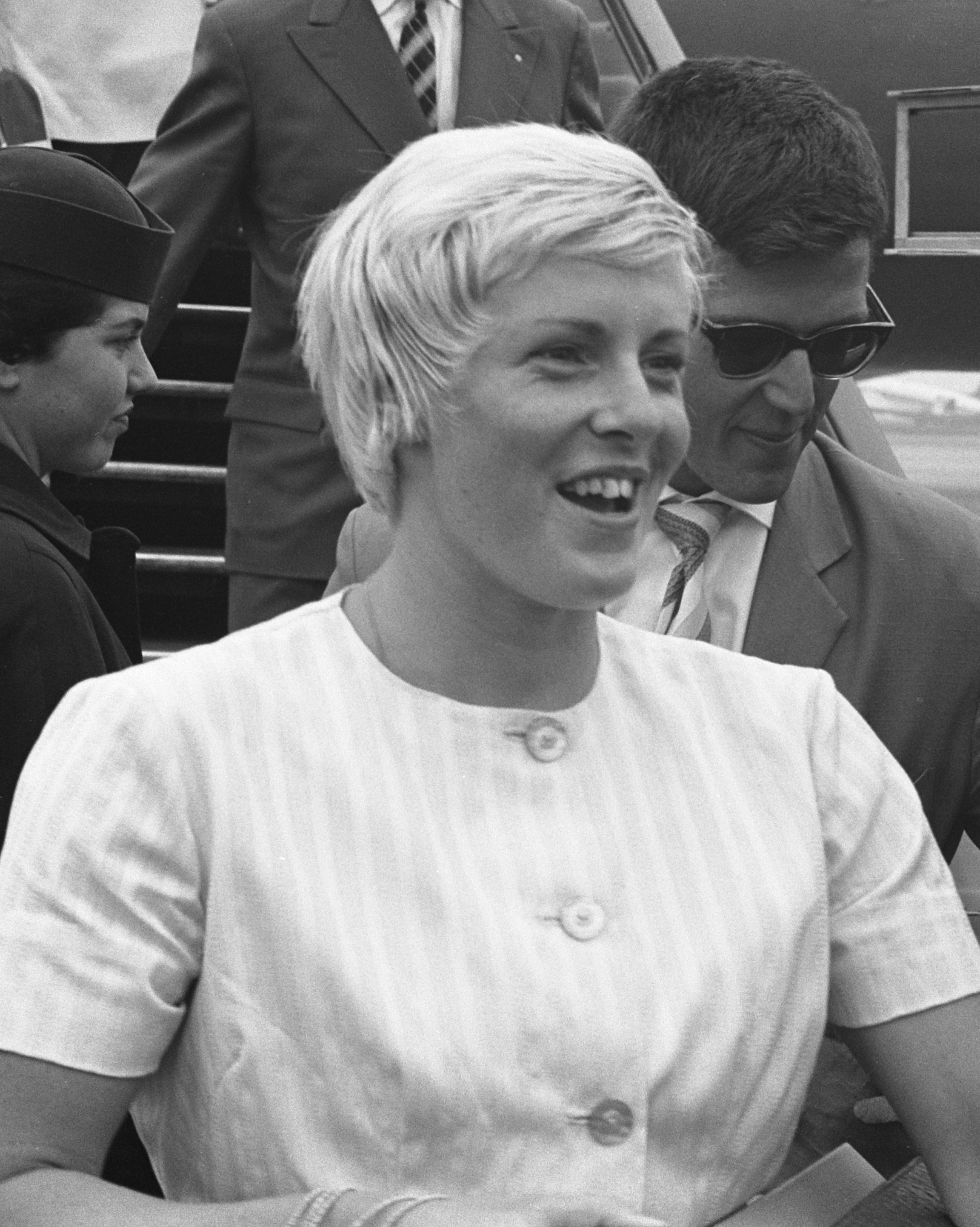
- Mary Kok in 1961

Personal information
- Born: 1940 (age 85–86) Hilversum, Netherlands

Sport
- Sport: Swimming
- Strokes: Freestyle, butterfly, medley

Mary Kok (born 1940) is a Dutch swimmer. Between 1954 and 1957 she set ten world records from the young age of 15 to 17 years. These included:

- 440 yd freestyle
- 880 yd freestyle
- 800 m freestyle
- 1760 yd freestyle
- 100 yd butterfly
- 100 m butterfly
- 400 yd individual medley
- 400 m individual medley
- 1 relay

Kok was to swim in the 1956 Summer Olympics in Melbourne for the Dutch Olympic Team until the night before she was to depart when the Netherlands boycotted the competition over Russia's invasion of Hungary. In 2016 Kok, along with other athletes whose athletic careers were affected by the boycott were honoured by the Hungarian government. Kok said in her speech, she had always felt that her gold medal was at the bottom of the swimming pool in Melbourne, but that the Hungarian people gave her the feeling that the honorary medal was given to her wholeheartedly. In 1960, Kok became the first Dutch woman to swim across the English Channel.

In 1955, she became Dutch Sportsperson of the year and in 1980, was inducted into the International Swimming Hall of Fame.

On 28 December 1962, she married Kees Oudegeest, and later became a swimming coach.

In 2015, Kok was invited by the Dutch Sports Federation to be recognised at their annual Athlete of the Year event. Kok won Athlete of the Year in 1955 at the age of 15 years.

== See also ==
- List of members of the International Swimming Hall of Fame
- World record progression 800 metres freestyle

Records
Preceded by Lorraine Crapp	Women's 800 metres freestyle world record holder (long course); 16 February 1957 – 9 January 1958	Succeeded by Ilsa Konrads
