= László Magyar (swimmer) =

Hungarian swimmer

Personal information
- Born: 30 March 1936 (age 90) Újpest, Hungary

Sport
- Sport: Swimming
- Club: Újpesti TE
Medal record
Representing Hungary
European Championships
Silver medal – second place	1954 Turin	100 m backstroke
Silver medal – second place	1958 Budapest	4×100 m medley

László Magyar (born 30 March 1936) is a retired Hungarian backstroke swimmer who won two silver medals at the European Championships of 1954 and 1958. He competed in the 100 m backstroke at the 1956 Summer Olympics, but did not reach the finals.
