= Herman Willemse =

Dutch swimmer (1934–2021)

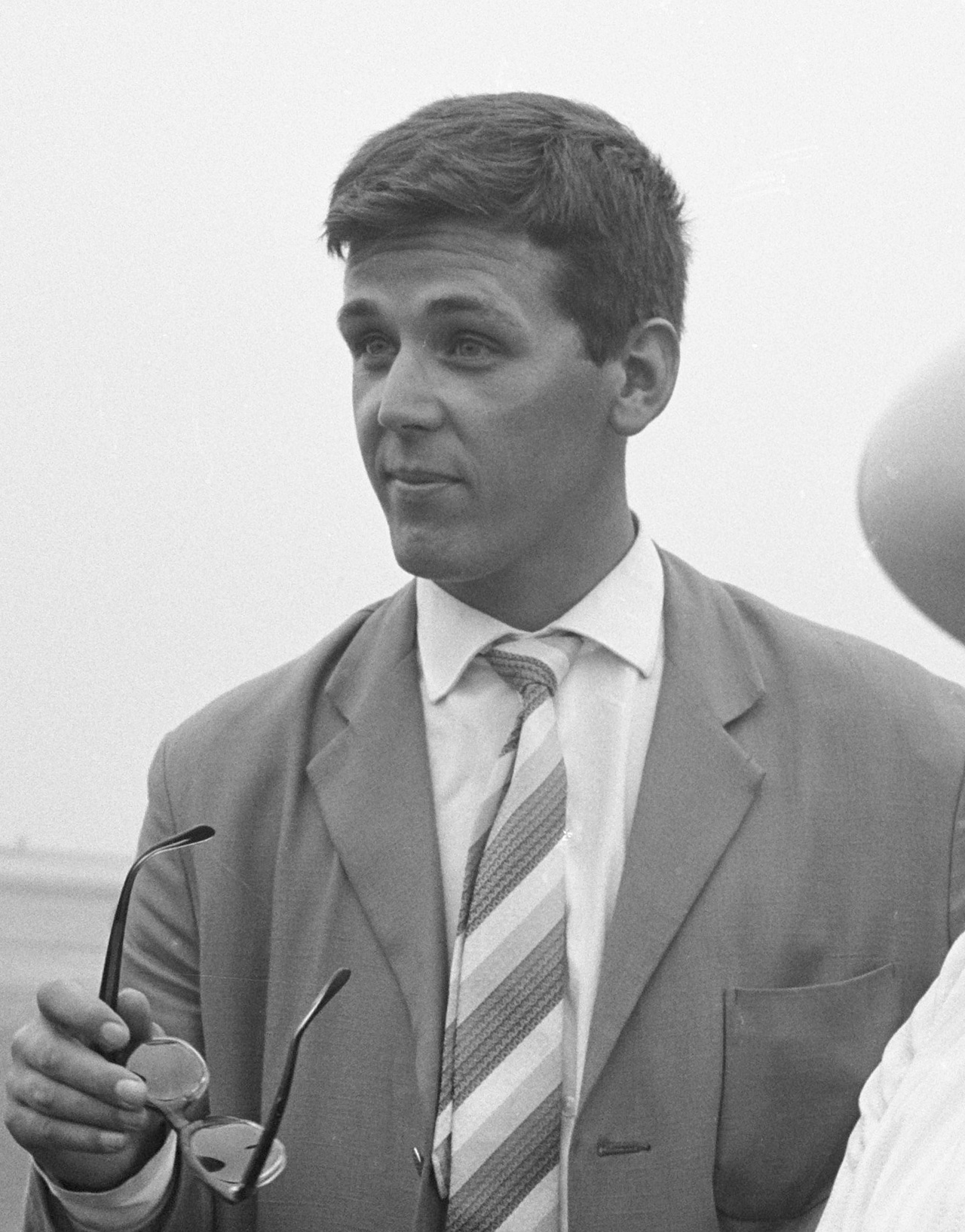
- Willemse in 1961

Personal information
- Born: May 22, 1934 Utrecht, Netherlands
- Died: July 7, 2021 (aged 87)

Sport
- Sport: Swimming

Herman "Flying Dutchman" Willemse (22 May 1934 – 7 July 2021) was a Dutch long-distance and marathon swimmer. In 2008, he was inducted to the International Marathon Swimming Hall of Fame.

Willemse started his career as a freestyle swimmer, winning 13 national titles and setting 19 national records in the 100 m, 200 m, 400 m, 800 m and 1500 m events between 1952 and 1958. In 1959, he switched to marathon swimming and became the second Dutchman to cross the English Channel, with a time of 12h49. Later in the 1960s he dominated the world marathon swimming. For three years after 1964, when the point system was introduced, he was ranked world number two, after Abdellatief Abouheif. His clean sweep of the Around-the-Island Marathon Swim in 1960–1964 brought the organizers to a problem that spectators lost interest in the race. The race was discontinued in 1965.

A school teacher by profession, Willemse was known for his academic approach to swimming. He would often travel around the place before the competition and measure the water temperature, to optimize his racing strategy, or even withdraw from a potentially disastrous race if the temperature was too low. He retired from competitive swimming around 1970 and published a book titled Marathonzwemmen (Marathon Swimming).

== International competitions ==
- St. John Lake Swim (1961, Canada, 30 km) – 1st place, 10h 7min
- St. John Lake Swim (1962, Canada, 30 km) – 1st place, 9h 3min
- St. John Lake Swim (1963, Canada, 30 km) – 1st place, 8h 32min
- Around-the-Island Marathon Swim (1960, Atlantic City, USA, 36 km) – 1st place, 10h 30min
- Around-the-Island Marathon Swim (1961, Atlantic City, USA, 36 km) – 1st place, 11h 14min
- Around-the-Island Marathon Swim (1962, Atlantic City, USA, 36 km) – 1st place, 11h 35min
- Around-the-Island Marathon Swim (1963, Atlantic City, USA, 36 km) – 1st place, 10h 31min
- Around-the-Island Marathon Swim (1964, Atlantic City, USA, 36 km) – 1st place, 10h 08min
- National Exhibition race (1961, Canada, 24 km) – 1st place, 6h 54min
- National Exhibition race (1962, Canada, 24 km) – 1st place, 6h 38min
- la Descente ou remontée du Saguenay (1966, 37 km) – 1st place, 6h 15min
- Tois Riviere (1961–1963 and 1965, Canada, 16 km) – 1st place (4 times)
- Santa Fe-Coronda (1963, Argentina, 58 km) – 1st place
- Santa Fe-Coronda (1964, Argentina, 58 km) – 3rd place
- Santa Fe-Coronda (1966, Argentina, 58 km) – 3rd place
- Hernandaras-Parana (Argentina, 88 km) – 1st place

== See also ==
- List of members of the International Swimming Hall of Fame

== Bibliography ==
- Wennerberg, Conrad (1999). Wind, Waves, and Sunburn: A Brief History of Marathon Swimming. Breakaway Books. ISBN 978-1-55821-615-0.
