= Ada den Haan =

Dutch swimmer (1941–2023)

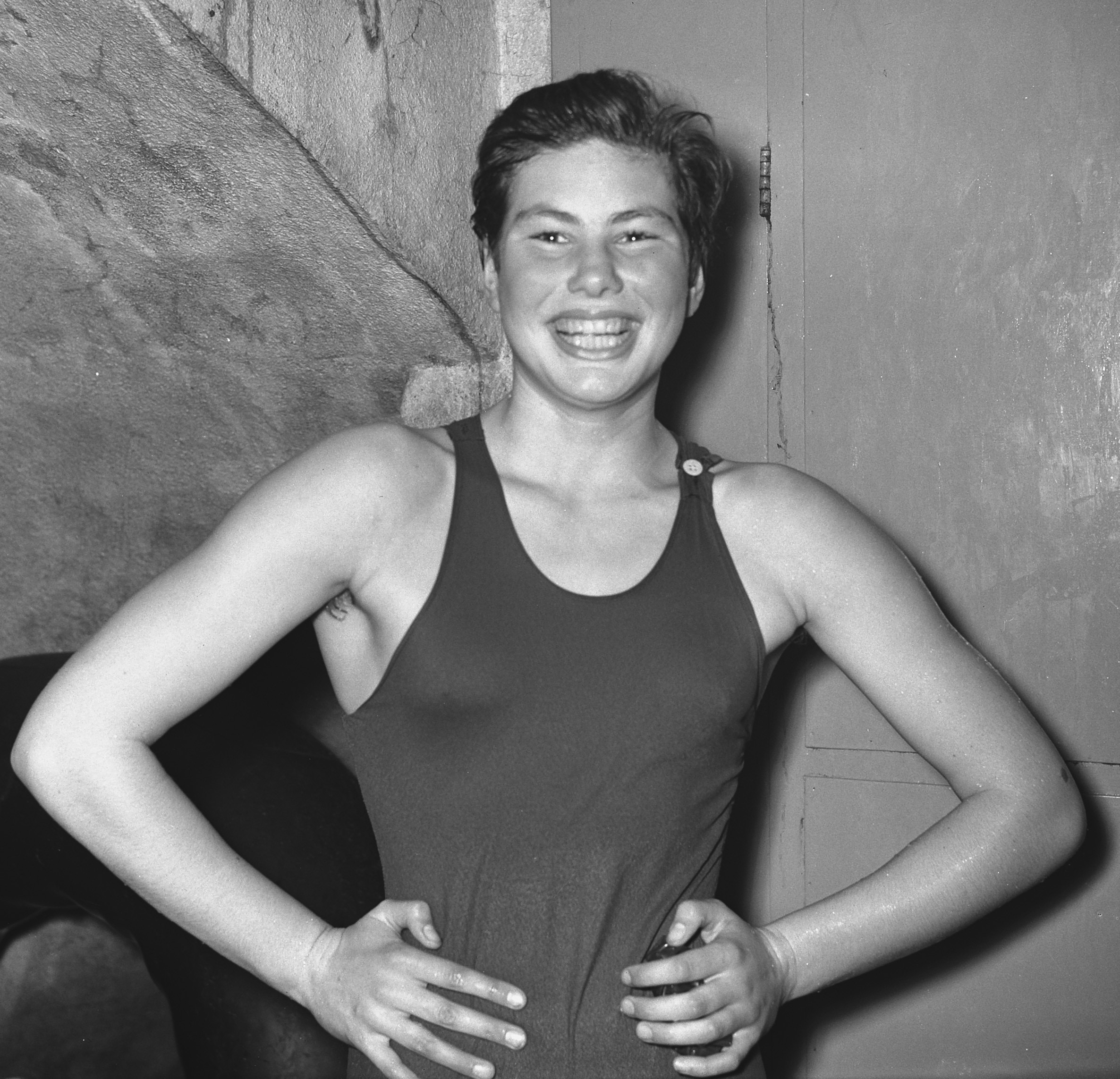
- Den Haan in 1955

Personal information
- Full name: Adelaïde Henriette den Haan
- Born: 14 May 1941 Eindhoven, German-occupied Netherlands
- Died: 17 March 2023 (aged 81) Uden, Netherlands
- Height: 1.80 m (5 ft 11 in)
- Weight: 80 kg (176 lb)

Sport
- Sport: Swimming
- Club: PSV, Eindhoven
Medal record
Representing the Netherlands
European Championships
Gold medal – first place	1958 Budapest	200 m breaststroke
Gold medal – first place	1958 Budapest	4×100 m medley

Adelaïde Henriette "Ada" den Haan (14 May 1941 – 17 March 2023) was a Dutch breaststroke swimmer. She dominated the 200m breaststroke event in the 1950s, setting four world records in 1956–1957, one under the old rules and three under the new rules that disallowed long underwater swimming. However, she could not participate in the 1956 Summer Olympics that were boycotted by the Netherlands in protest of the suppression of the Hungarian Revolution by the Soviet Union. She won two European gold medals in 1958, but by 1959 her world record was broken and her dominance faded away. At the 1960 Summer Olympics she was part of the Dutch medley team that broke the Olympic record in the preliminaries; however, they finished fourth in the final. She was also fourth in the individual 200 m breastroke event. She married Martien Swinkels, the coach of the Dutch swimming star Marcel Wouda.

Den Haan died on 17 March 2023, at the age of 81.
