= Pavel Pazdírek =

Czechoslovak swimmer

Personal information
- Born: 14 October 1937 (age 88) Brno, Czechoslovakia
- Height: 1.72 m (5 ft 8 in)
- Weight: 76 kg (168 lb)
Medal record
Men's swimming
Representing Czechoslovakia
European Championships
Silver medal – second place	1958 Budapest	200 m butterfly
Summer Universiade
Bronze medal – third place	1959 Turin	200m butterfly

Pavel Pazdírek (born 14 October 1937) is a retired swimmer from Czechoslovakia who won a silver medal in the 200 m butterfly at the 1958 European Aquatics Championships. He competed in the same event at the 1960 Summer Olympics, but did not reach the final.
