= Roberto Lazzari =

Italian swimmer (1937–2017)

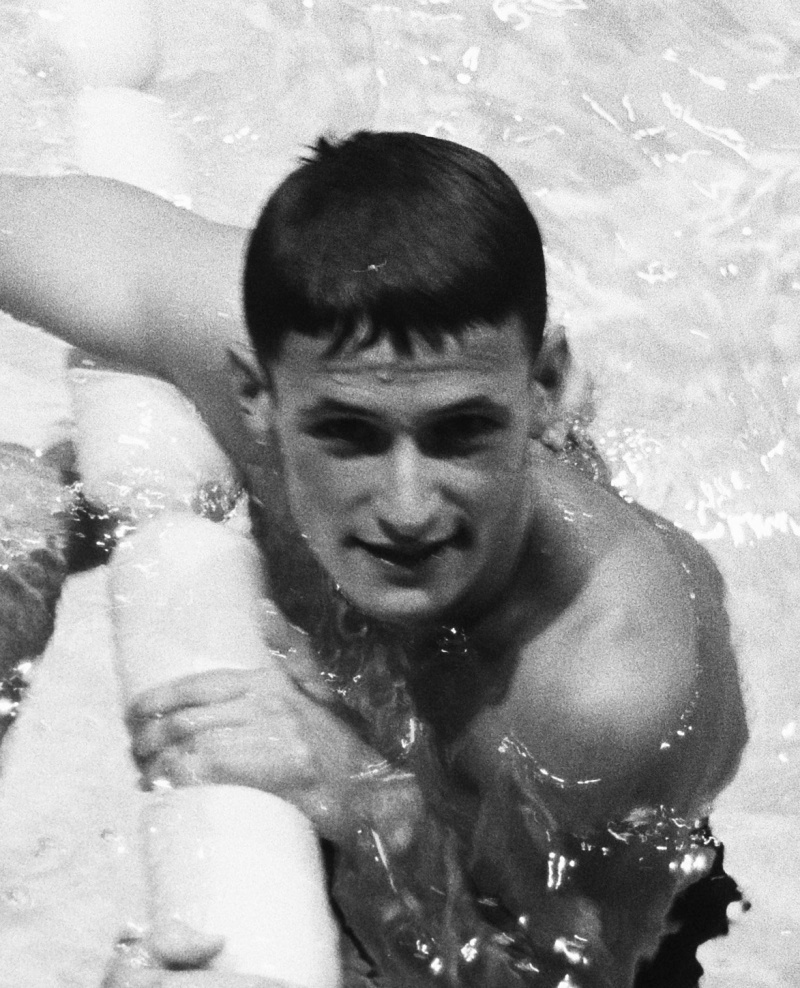
- Roberto Lazzari in 1960

Personal information
- Born: 14 December 1937 Milan, Italy
- Died: 31 July 2017 (aged 79)
- Height: 1.78 m (5 ft 10 in)
- Weight: 72 kg (159 lb)

Sport
- Sport: Swimming
Medal record
Representing Italy
European Championships
Silver medal – second place	1958 Budapest	200 m breaststroke
Bronze medal – third place	1958 Budapest	4×100 m medley
Summer Universiade
Gold medal – first place	1959 Turin	4x100m medley relay
Silver medal – second place	1959 Turin	200m breaststroke
Mediterranean Games
Gold medal – first place	1959 Beirut	200m breaststroke
Gold medal – first place	1959 Beirut	4x100m medley relay
Silver medal – second place	1955 Barcelona	200m butterfly

Roberto Lazzari (14 December 1937 – 31 July 2017) was an Italian former breaststroke swimmer who won two medals at the 1958 European Aquatics Championships in the 200 m breaststroke and 4 × 100 m medley relay. He finished in fifth and sixth place, respectively, in the same events at the 1960 Summer Olympics.
