= Hungary at the 1960 Summer Olympics =

- IOC code: HUN (UNG used at these Games)
- NOC: Hungarian Olympic Committee

in Rome
- Competitors: 184 (157 men and 27 women) in 18 sports
- Flag bearer: János Simon
- Medals Ranked 7th: Gold 6 Silver 8 Bronze 7 Total 21

Summer Olympics appearances (overview)
- 1896; 1900; 1904; 1908; 1912; 1920; 1924; 1928; 1932; 1936; 1948; 1952; 1956; 1960; 1964; 1968; 1972; 1976; 1980; 1984; 1988; 1992; 1996; 2000; 2004; 2008; 2012; 2016; 2020; 2024

Other related appearances
- 1906 Intercalated Games

Hungary competed at the 1960 Summer Olympics in Rome, Italy. 184 competitors, 157 men and 27 women, took part in 107 events in 18 sports.

== Medalists ==
=== Gold ===
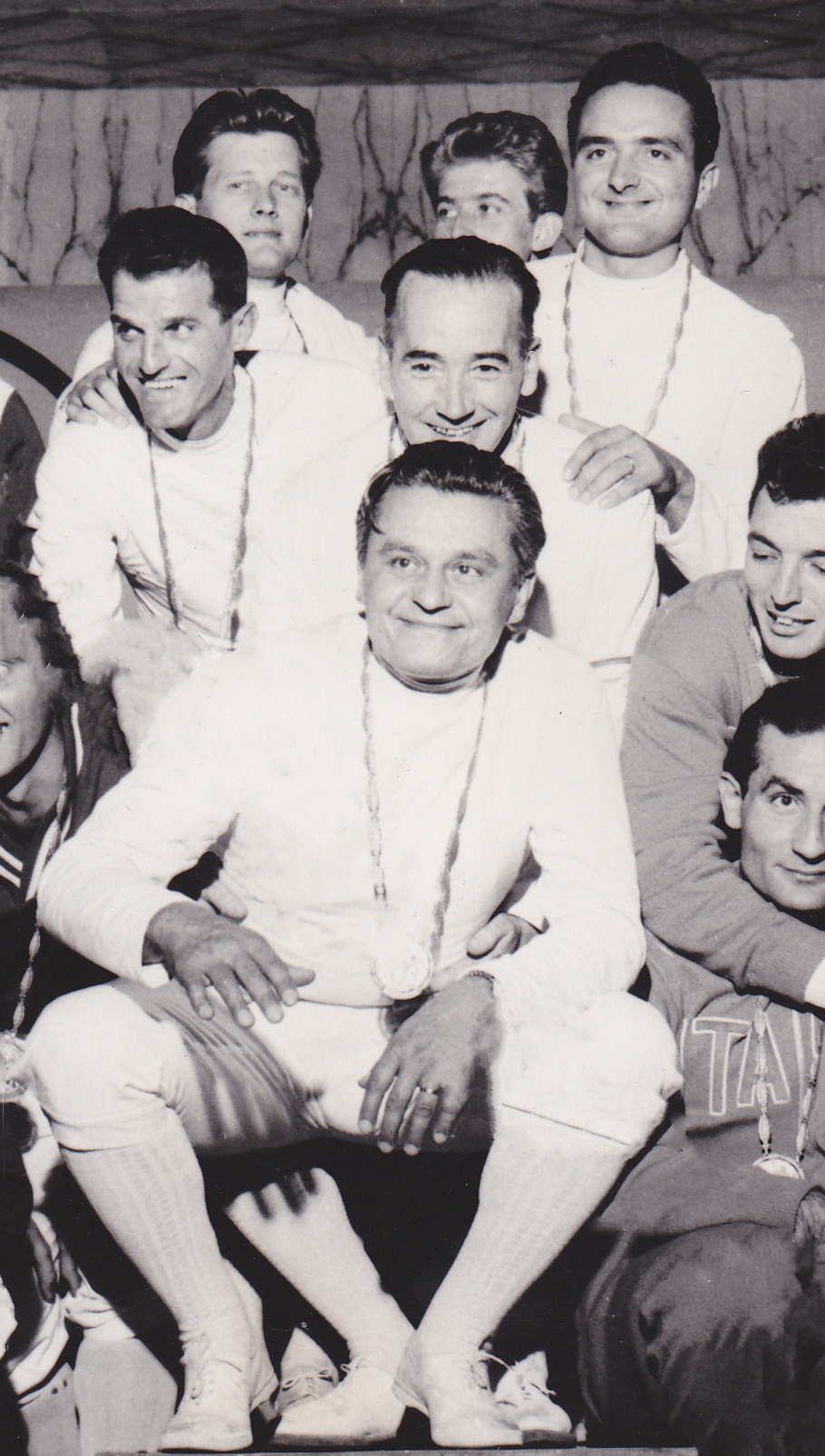
The Hungarian sabre team led by Aladár Gerevich (center). Pál Kovács is above him and Rudolf Kárpáti is above-left.

- Rudolf Kárpáti — Fencing, Men's Sabre individual
- Ferenc Németh — Modern pentathlon, Men's Individual Competition
- János Parti — Canoe racing, Men's C-1 1000 metres
- Gyula Török — Boxing, Flyweight
- András Balczó, Imre Nagy, Ferenc Németh — Modern pentathlon, Men's Team Competition
- Gábor Delneky, Aladár Gerevich, Zoltán Horváth, Rudolf Kárpáti, Pál Kovács, Tamás Mendelényi — Fencing, Men's Sabre Team

=== Silver ===
- Zoltán Horváth — Fencing, Men's Sabre individual
- Imre Nagy — Modern pentathlon, Men's Individual Competition
- Imre Polyák — Wrestling, Featherweight
- Imre Szöllősi — Canoe racing, Men's K-1 1000 metres
- Gyula Zsivótzky — Athletics, Men's Hammer throw
- György Mészáros, András Szente — Canoe racing, Men's K-2 1000 metres
- Imre Kemeczei, György Mészáros, András Szente, Imre Szöllősi — Canoe racing, Men's K-1 4x500 metres
- Lídia Dömölky, Katalin Juhász, Györgyi Marvalits, Magda Nyári, Ildikó Rejtő — Fencing, Women's Team foil

=== Bronze ===
- Gergely Kulcsár — Athletics, Men's Javelin throw
- István Rózsavölgyi — Athletics, Men's 1500 metres
- Győző Veres — Weightlifting, Middleweight
- Imre Farkas, András Törő — Canoe racing, Men's C-2 1000 metres
- Klára Fried-Bánfalvi, Vilma Egresi — Canoe racing, Women's K-2 500 metres
- Flórián Albert, Jenő Dalnoki, Zoltán Dudás, János Dunai, Lajos Faragó, János Göröcs, Ferenc Kovács, Dezső Novák, Pál Orosz, Tibor Pál, Gyula Rákosi, Imre Sátori, Ernő Solymosi, Gábor Török, Pál Várhidi and Oszkár Vilezsál — Football (soccer), men's team competition
- Kálmán Markovits, András Katona, György Kárpáti, László Jeney, Otto Boros, István Hevesi, Mihály Mayer, Zoltán Dömötör, Dezső Gyarmati, Tivadar Kanizsa and Péter Rusorán — Water polo, men's team competition

== Cycling ==
Five male cyclists represented Hungary in 1960.

Individual road race

- Ferenc Stámusz
- János Dévai
- Ferenc Horváth
- Győző Török

1000m time trial

- János Söre

== Diving ==
Men

Athlete	Event	Preliminary		Semi-final				Final			
Athlete	Event	Points	Rank	Points	Rank	Total	Rank	Points	Rank	Total	Rank
József Dóra	3 m springboard	41.21	30	Did not advance							
János Konkoly	3 m springboard	46.94	24	Did not advance							
József Dóra	10 m platform	45.51	23	Did not advance							
János Konkoly	10 m platform	50.01	=18	Did not advance							

== Fencing ==
21 fencers, 16 men and 5 women, represented Hungary in 1960.

Men's foil

- Mihály Fülöp
- Jenő Kamuti
- László Kamuti

Men's team foil

- Ferenc Czvikovszki, Jenő Kamuti, Mihály Fülöp, László Kamuti, József Gyuricza, József Sákovics

Men's épée

- József Sákovics
- István Kausz
- Tamás Gábor

Men's team épée

- József Marosi, Tamás Gábor, István Kausz, József Sákovics, Árpád Bárány

Men's sabre

- Rudolf Kárpáti
- Zoltán Horváth
- Aladár Gerevich

Men's team sabre

- Aladár Gerevich, Rudolf Kárpáti, Pál Kovács, Zoltán Horváth, Gábor Delneky, Tamás Mendelényi

Women's foil

- Magda Nyári-Kovács
- Ildikó Ságiné Ujlakyné Rejtő
- Lídia Sákovicsné Dömölky

Women's team foil

- Ildikó Ságiné Ujlakyné Rejtő, Györgyi Marvalics-Székely, Magda Nyári-Kovács, Katalin Nagyné Juhász, Lídia Sákovicsné Dömölky

== Modern pentathlon ==
Three male pentathletes represented Hungary in 1960. The team won gold and Ferenc Németh won an individual gold and Imre Nagy won silver.

Individual

- Ferenc Németh
- Imre Nagy
- András Balczó

Team

- Ferenc Németh
- Imre Nagy
- András Balczó

== Rowing ==
Hungary had nine male rowers participate in three out of seven rowing events in 1960.

Men's coxed pair

- Pál Wágner
- László Munteán
- Gyula Lengyel (cox)

Men's coxless four

- Lajos Kiss
- György Sarlós
- József Sátori
- Béla Zsitnik

Men's coxed four

- Tibor Bedekovits
- Csaba Kovács
- László Munteán
- Pál Wágner
- Gyula Lengyel (cox)

== Shooting ==
Ten shooters represented Hungary in 1960.

25 m pistol

- Ferenc Kun
- József Gyönyörű

50 m pistol

- Ambrus Balogh

300 m rifle, three positions

- Sándor Krebs
- Miklós Szabó

50 m rifle, three positions

- János Holup
- Imre Simkó

50 m rifle, prone

- János Dosztály
- Imre Simkó

Trap

- Ede Szomjas
- Károly Kulin-Nagy

== Swimming ==
Men

Athlete	Event	Heat		Semifinal		Final	
Athlete	Event	Time	Rank	Time	Rank	Time	Rank
Gyula Dobay	100 m freestyle	56.5	=6 Q	56.3	=4 Q	56.3	5
László Lantos	100 m freestyle	57.4	14 Q	58.0	=18	Did not advance	
Tamás Hornyánszky	400 m freestyle	4:46.2	29	—N/a		Did not advance	
József Katona	400 m freestyle	4:29.5	9	—N/a		Did not advance	
András Bodnár	1500 m freestyle	20:22.2	27	—N/a		Did not advance	
József Katona	1500 m freestyle	17:53.5	5 Q	—N/a		17:43.7	5
József Csikány	100 m backstroke	1:04.5	8 Q	1:05.2	=12	Did not advance	
János Konrád	100 m backstroke	1:19.9	37	Did not advance			
László Felkai	200 m breaststroke	DSQ		Did not advance			
György Kunsági	200 m breaststroke	2:42.2	14 Q	2:42.4	15	Did not advance	
László Kiss	200 m butterfly	2:31.0	24	Did not advance			
György Müller; László Lantos; Gyula Dobay; József Katona	4 × 200 m freestyle	8:32.6	10	—N/a		Did not advance	
József Csikány; György Kunsági; László Kiss; László Lantos	4 × 100 m medley	4:17.7	=9	—N/a		Did not advance	

Women

Athlete	Event	Heat		Semifinal		Final	
Athlete	Event	Time	Rank	Time	Rank	Time	Rank
Katalin Boros	100 m freestyle	1:05.2	12 Q	1:06.2	15	Did not advance	
Csilla Madarász	100 m freestyle	1:04.5	9 Q	1:03.0	4 Q	1:03.6	5
Mária Frank	400 m freestyle	5:21.9	18	—N/a		Did not advance	
Magda Dávid	100 m backstroke	1:15.7	21	—N/a		Did not advance	
Anna Temesvári	100 m backstroke	1:21.5	29	—N/a		Did not advance	
Klára Killermann	200 m breaststroke	2:58.7	13	—N/a		Did not advance	
Márta Egerváry	100 m butterfly	1:19.4	22	—N/a		Did not advance	
Anna Temesvári; Mária Frank; Katalin Boros; Csilla Madarász	4 × 100 m freestyle	4:22.2	3 Q	—N/a		4:21.2	4
Magda Dávid; Klára Killermann; Márta Egerváry; Csilla Madarász	4 × 100 m medley	4:52.8	5 Q	—N/a		4:53.7	6
