= Swimming at the 1960 Summer Olympics – Women's 4 × 100 metre freestyle relay =

Women's 4 × 100 metre freestyle relay at the Games of the XVII Olympiad
- Venue: Stadio Olimpico del Nuoto
- Dates: 2 September 1960 (heats); 3 September 1960 (final)
- Competitors: 55 from 12 nations
- Teams: 12
- Winning time: 4:08.9 WR

Medalists
1st place, gold medalist(s)		Joan Spillane, Shirley Stobs, Carolyn Wood, Chris von Saltza, Donna de Varona*, Susan Doerr*, Sylvia Ruuska*, Molly Botkin*	United States
2nd place, silver medalist(s)		Dawn Fraser, Ilsa Konrads, Lorraine Crapp, Alva Colquhoun, Sandra Morgan*, Ruth Everuss*	Australia
3rd place, bronze medalist(s)		Christel Steffin, Heidi Pechstein, Gisela Weiß, Ursel Brunner *Swimmers who participated in the heats only. Under 1960 Olympic rules, they did not receive a medal.	United Team of Germany

The women's 4 × 100 metre freestyle relay event at the 1960 Olympic Games took place on September 2 and 3, in Rome. This swimming event used freestyle as a relay, with swimmers typically using the front crawl. Because an Olympic size swimming pool is 50 metres long, each of the four swimmers completed two lengths of the pool. The first swimmer had to touch the wall before the second could leave the starting block; timing of the starts was thus important.

== Results ==
=== Heats ===
Heat 1

Place	Swimmers	Time	Notes
1	Donna de Varona, Susan Doerr, Sylvia Ruuska, Molly Botkin (USA)	4:18.9	
2	Beryl Noakes, Judy Samuel, Christine Harris, Natalie Steward (GBR)	4:24.4	
3	Inger Thorngren, Karin Larsson, Kristina Larsson, Bibbi Segerström (SWE)	4:27.3	
4	Daniela Beneck, Rosanna Contardo, Maria Cristina Pacifici, Paola Saini (ITA)	4:31.8	
5	Yoshiko Sato, Eiko Wada, Kimiko Ezaka, Hitomi Jinno (JPN)	4:35.9	
6	Eulalia Martínez, Silvia Belmar, Blanca Barrón, María Luisa Souza (MEX)	4:43.1	

Heat 2

Place	Swimmers	Time	Notes
1	Sandra Morgan, Alva Colquhoun, Ruth Everuss, Lorraine Crapp (AUS)	4:17.6	
2	Anna Temesvári, Mária Frank, Katalin Boros, Csilla Madarász-Bajnogel-Dobai (HUN)	4:22.2	
3	Christel Steffin, Heidi Pechstein, Gisela Weiß, Ursel Brunner (EUA)	4:24.2	
4	Irina Lyakhovskaya, Ulvi Voog, Galina Sosnova, Marina Shamal (URS)	4:31.9	
5	Héda Frost, Annie Caron, Colette Libourel, Marie-Laure Gaillot (FRA)	4:35.2	
6	Hennie van der Velde, Jopie Troost, Sieta Posthumus, Cocki van Engelsdorp Gastelaars (NED)		DQ

=== Final ===
Place	Swimmers	Time	Notes
1st place, gold medalist(s)	Joan Spillane, Shirley Stobs, Carolyn Wood, Chris von Saltza (USA)	4:08.9	WR
2nd place, silver medalist(s)	Dawn Fraser, Ilsa Konrads, Lorraine Crapp, Alva Colquhoun (AUS)	4:11.3	
3rd place, bronze medalist(s)	Christel Steffin, Heidi Pechstein, Gisela Weiß, Ursel Brunner (EUA)	4:19.7	
4	Anna Temesvári, Mária Frank, Katalin Boros, Csilla Madarász-Bajnogel-Dobai (HUN)	4:21.2	
5	Natalie Steward, Beryl Noakes, Judy Samuel, Christine Harris (GBR)	4:24.6	
6	Inger Thorngren, Karin Larsson, Kristina Larsson, Bibbi Segerström (SWE)	4:25.1	
7	Paola Saini, Anna Maria Cecchi, Rosanna Contardo, Maria Cristina Pacifici (ITA)	4:26.8	
8	Irina Lyakhovskaya, Ulvi Voog, Galina Sosnova, Marina Shamal (URS)	4:29.0	
