= France at the 1960 Summer Olympics =

- IOC code: FRA
- NOC: French Olympic Committee

in Rome
- Competitors: 238 (210 men and 28 women) in 19 sports
- Flag bearer: Christian d'Oriola
- Medals Ranked 25th: Gold 0 Silver 2 Bronze 3 Total 5

Summer Olympics appearances (overview)
- 1896; 1900; 1904; 1908; 1912; 1920; 1924; 1928; 1932; 1936; 1948; 1952; 1956; 1960; 1964; 1968; 1972; 1976; 1980; 1984; 1988; 1992; 1996; 2000; 2004; 2008; 2012; 2016; 2020; 2024

Other related appearances
- 1906 Intercalated Games

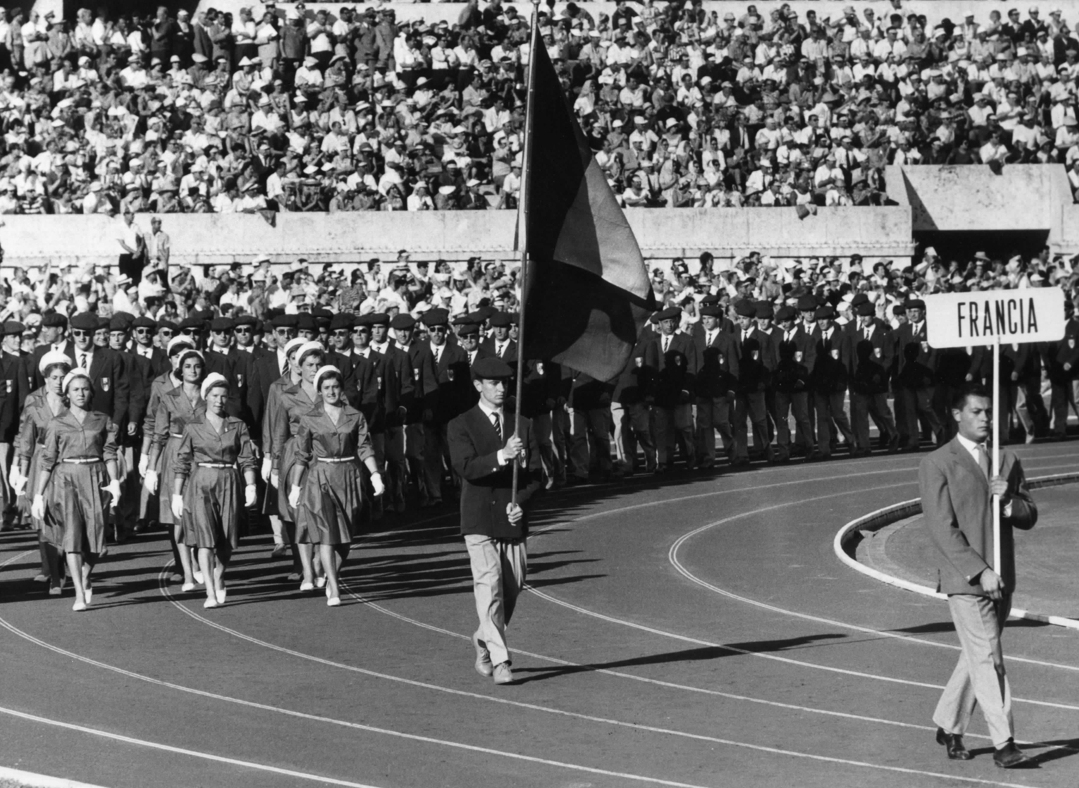
France at the 1960 Olympic Opening Ceremony, headed by the flag bearer Christian d'Oriola

France competed at the 1960 Summer Olympics in Rome, Italy, and failed to win a single gold medal for the second time only (and, to date, the last) in the history of the modern Olympic Games. 238 competitors, 210 men and 28 women, took part in 120 events in 19 sports.

== Medalists ==
=== Silver ===
- Michel Jazy — Athletics, Men's 1500 metres
- Robert Dumontois, Jean Klein, Claude Martin, Jacques Morel, and Guy Nosbaum — Rowing, Men's Coxed Fours

=== Bronze ===
- Abdoulaye Seye — Athletics, Men's 200 metres
- Guy Lefrant, Jack Le Goff, and Jehan Le Roy — Equestrian, Three-Day Event Team Competition
- René Schiermeyer — Wrestling, Men's Greco-Roman Welterweight

== Athletics ==
France had 36 competitors, 7 women and 29 men, in 25 athletics events.

=== Women's athletics ===
Women's 100 metres
Catherine Capdevielle

Women's 200 metres
Catherine Capdevielle

Women's 800 metres
Maryvonne Dupureur
Nicole Goullieux

Women's 80 metres hurdles
Denise Laborie-Guénard
Simone Brièrre

Women's high jump
Florence Pétry-Amiel

Women's long jump
Madeleine Thétu

=== Men's athletics ===
Men's 100 metres
Jocelyn Delecour
Abdoulaye Sèye
Claude Piquemal

Men's 200 metres
Abdoulaye Sèye – Bronze
Paul Genevay
Jocelyn Delecour

Men's 800 metres
Pierre-Yvon Lenoir

Men's 1500 metres
Michel Jazy – Silver
Michel Bernard

Men's 5000 metres
Michel Bernard
Hamoud Ameur

Men's 10,000 metres
Robert Bogey
Hamoud Ameur
Hamida Addèche

Men's marathon
Alain Mimoun
Paul Genève

Men's 110 metres hurdles
Edmond Roudnitska
Marcel Duriez
Jacques Déprez

Men's 3000 metres steeplechase
Guy Texereau

Men's 4 × 100 metres relay
Jocelyn Delecour, Paul Genevay, Claude Piquemal, Abdoulaye Sèye

Men's 20 kilometres walk
Henri Delerue

Men's 50 kilometres walk
Jacques Arnoux

Men's high jump
Mahamat Idriss
Maurice Fournier

Men's pole vault
Victor Sillon

Men's long jump
Christian Collardot
Ali Brakchi

Men's triple jump
Éric Battista
Pierre William

Men's discus throw
Pierre Alard

Men's hammer throw
Guy Husson

Men's javelin throw
Michel Macquet
Léon Syrovatski

== Basketball ==
The French men's basketball team had 12 players.

Team
Roger Antoine, Philippe Baillet, Christian Baltzer, Louis Bertorelle, Jean-Paul Beugnot, Jérôme Christ, Jean Degros, Max Dorigo, Henri Grange, Bernard Mayeur, Robert Monclar, Henri Villecourt

== Boxing ==
France had eight male competitors in eight boxing events.

Flyweight (51 kg)
Antoine Porcel

Bantamweight (54 kg)
Jean Parra

Featherweight
André Iuncker

Lightweight (60 kg)
Jacques Cotot

Welterweight (67 kg)
Jean Josselin

Light middleweight (71 kg)
Souleymane Diallo

Middleweight (75 kg)
Yoland Levèque

Heavyweight (+81 kg)
Joseph Syoz

== Canoeing ==
France had 9 competitors, 1 woman and 8 men, in 4 canoeing and kayaking events.

Women's K-1 500 metres
Gabrielle Lutz

Men's K-1 1000 metres
Michel Meyer

Men's K-1 4 × 500 metres
Henri Amazouze, Jean Houde, Pierre Derivery, Jean Friquet, Fredy Grosheny

Men's C-2 1000 metres
Georges Turlier, Michel Picard

== Cycling ==
France had 14 men compete in six cycling events.

Individual road race
Jacques Gestraut
Roland Lacombe
François Hamon
Raymond Reaux

Team time trial
Henri Duez, François Hamon, Roland Lacombe, Jacques Simon

Sprint
Antoine Pellegrina
André Gruchet

1000m time trial
Michel Scob

Tandem
Roland Surrugue, Michel Scob

Team pursuit
Marcel Delattre, Jacques Suire, Guy Claud, Michel Nédélec

== Diving ==
France had 4 competitors, 1 woman and 3 men, in 4 diving events.

Men

Athlete	Event	Preliminary		Semi-final				Final			
Athlete	Event	Points	Rank	Points	Rank	Total	Rank	Points	Rank	Total	Rank
Christian Pire	3 m springboard	50.49	18	Did not advance							
Georges Senecot	3 m springboard	53.93	7 Q	38.54	14	92.47	9	Did not advance			
Henri Rouquet	10 m platform	50.74	16 Q	32.81	16	83.55	16	Did not advance			

Women

Athlete	Event	Preliminary		Semi-final				Final			
Athlete	Event	Points	Rank	Points	Rank	Total	Rank	Points	Rank	Total	Rank
Nicole Péllissard-Darrigrand	3 m springboard	48.96	10 Q	36.76	9	85.72	9	Did not advance			
Nicole Péllissard-Darrigrand	10 m platform	49.68	12 Q	—N/a				31.50	=5	81.18	7

== Equestrian ==
France had 7 male competitors in 4 equestrianism events.

Men's three-day events, Individual and Team
Jack Le Goff
Guy Lefrant
Jéhan Le Roy
Pierre Durand Sr.

Mixed jumping events, Individual and Team
Bernard de Fombelle
Max Fresson
Pierre Jonquères d'Oriola

== Fencing ==
France had 21 competitors, 16 men and 5 women, in 8 fencing events.

Men's foil
Roger Closset
Christian d'Oriola
Jean-Claude Magnan

Men's team foil
Jacky Courtillat, Jean-Claude Magnan, Guy Barrabino, Claude Netter, Christian d'Oriola

Men's épée
Yves Dreyfus
Armand Mouyal
Jack Guittet

Men's team épée
Armand Mouyal, Yves Dreyfus, Claude Brodin, Christian d'Oriola, Jack Guittet, Gérard Lefranc

Men's sabre
Claude Arabo
Jacques Roulot
Jacques Lefèvre

Men's team sabre
Marcel Parent, Claude Gamot, Jacques Lefèvre, Jacques Roulot, Claude Arabo

Women's foil
Catherine Delbarre
Régine Veronnet
Monique Leroux

Women's team foil
Monique Leroux, Régine Veronnet, Françoise Mailliard, Renée Garilhe, Catherine Delbarre

== Football ==
The French men's football team had 17 players.

Team
Ahmed Arab, Marcel Artélésa, Raymond Baratto, Pierre Bodin, Jean-Baptiste Bordas, Claude Dubaële, Gérard Coinçon, André Giamarchi, Gines Gonzales, Marcel Loncle, François Philippe, Louis Polonia, Yvon Quédec, Charles Samoy, Max Samper, Jacques Stamm, Jean Wettstein

== Gymnastics ==
France had 12 competitors, 6 women and 6 men, in 14 gymnastics events.

Women's events – Team all-around, Individual all-around, Floor, Vault, Uneven bars, Balance beam
Jacqueline Dieudonné
Anne-Marie Demortière
Renée Hugon
Paulette le Raer
Monique Rossi
Danièle Sicot-Coulon

Men's events – Team all-around, Individual all-around, Floor, Vault, Parallel bars, Horizontal bar, Rings, Pommel horse
Robert Caymaris
Bernard Fauqueux
Jean Jaillard
Mohamed Lazhari
Michel Mathiot
Daniel Touche

== Hockey ==
The French men's hockey team had 16 players.

Team
Yvan Bia, Roger Bignon, Jacques Bonnet, Pierre Court, Jean Desmasures, Maurice Dobigny, Claude Dugardin, Claude Leroy, Diran Manoukian, Ido Marang, Jacques Mauchien, Gérard Poulain, Philippe Reynaud, Albert Vanpoulle, Claude Windal, Jean-Pierre Windal

== Modern pentathlon ==
France had three male competitors in two modern pentathlon events.

Individual
André Bernard
Christian Beauvalet
Étienne Jalenques

Team
André Bernard, Christian Beauvalet, Étienne Jalenques

== Rowing ==
France had 16 male competitors in three rowing events.

Men's double sculls – 4th place
René Duhamel, Bernard Monnereau

Men's coxed four – 2nd place ( Silver medal)
Robert Dumontois, Claude Martin, Jacques Morel, Guy Nosbaum, Jean Klein

Men's eight – 4th place
Christian Puibaraud, Jean-Louis Bellet, Émile Clerc, Jean Ledoux, Gaston Mercier, Bernard Meynadier, Joseph Moroni, Michel Viaud, Alain Bouffard

== Sailing ==
France had 11 male competitors in five sailing events.

Finn – 1-person Finn (dinghy)
Yves-Louis Pinaud

Flying Dutchman – 2-person Flying Dutchman (dinghy)
Jean-Claude Cornu (helmsman), Daniel Gouffier

Star – 2-person Star (keelboat)
Georges Pisani (helmsman), Noël Desaubliaux

Dragon – 3-person Dragon (keelboat)
Jean Peytel (helmsman), Philippe Reinhart, François Thierry-Mieg

5.5 Metre – 3-person 5.5 Metre (keelboat)
Jacques Baptiste Lebrun (helmsman), Pierre Buret, Louis Chauvot

== Shooting ==
France had seven men participate in five shooting events.

25 m pistol
Jacques Decaux
Jean Renaux

50 m pistol
Serge Hubert

50 m rifle, three positions
Pierre Guy
Georges Wahler

50 m rifle, prone
Pierre Guy
Georges Wahler

Trap
Claude Foussier
Marcel Otto-Bruc

== Swimming ==
Men

Athlete	Event	Heat		Semifinal		Final	
Athlete	Event	Time	Rank	Time	Rank	Time	Rank
Alain Gottvallès	100 m freestyle	56.3	=3 Q	58.5	22	Did not advance	
Gérard Gropaiz	100 m freestyle	59.3	34	Did not advance			
Jean-Pascal Curtillet	400 m freestyle	4:36.5	16	—N/a		Did not advance	
Jean Pommat	400 m freestyle	4:46.5	30	—N/a		Did not advance	
Robert Christophe	100 m backstroke	1:04.0	=5 Q	1:03.7	=2 Q	1:03.2	4
Claude Raffy	100 m backstroke	1:05.8	=18	Did not advance			
Richard Audoly	200 m breaststroke	2:46.5	24	Did not advance			
Roland Boullanger	200 m breaststroke	2:54.4	35	Did not advance			
Henri Vidil	200 m butterfly	2:36.0	28	Did not advance			
Jean-Pascal Curtillet; Gérard Gropaiz; Marc Kamoun; Jean Boiteux	4 × 200 m freestyle	8:41.2	12	—N/a		Did not advance	
Robert Christophe; Roland Boullanger; Jean Pommat; Alain Gottvallès	4 × 100 m medley	4:21.7	11	—N/a		Did not advance	

Women

Athlete	Event	Heat		Semifinal		Final	
Athlete	Event	Time	Rank	Time	Rank	Time	Rank
Héda Frost	100 m freestyle	1:05.8	13 Q	1:05.4	=11	Did not advance	
Marie-Laure Gaillot	100 m freestyle	1:08.0	27	Did not advance			
Héda Frost	400 m freestyle	5:00.6	9	—N/a		Did not advance	
Nadine Delache	100 m backstroke	1:12.5	8 Q	—N/a		1:12.4	8
Rosy Piacentini	100 m backstroke	1:12.2	=6 Q	—N/a		1:11.4	5
Amélie Mirkowitch	200 m breaststroke	3:01.5	17	—N/a		Did not advance	
Michèle Pialat	200 m breaststroke	3:02.2	19	—N/a		Did not advance	
Annie Caron	100 m butterfly	1:17.1	18	—N/a		Did not advance	
Colette Libourel	100 m butterfly	1:20.4	24	—N/a		Did not advance	
Héda Frost; Annie Caron; Colette Libourel; Marie-Laure Gaillot	4 × 100 m freestyle	4:35.2	9	—N/a		Did not advance	
Rosy Piacentini; Michèle Pialat; Annie Caron; Héda Frost	4 × 100 m medley	4:59.7	10	—N/a		Did not advance	

== See also ==
- France at the 1960 Summer Paralympics
