= Swimming at the 1960 Summer Olympics – Women's 100 metre freestyle =

Women's 100 metre freestyle at the Games of the XVII Olympiad
- Venue: Stadio Olimpico del Nuoto
- Date: 26 August 1960 (heats & semifinals); 29 August 1960 (final)
- Competitors: 32 from 19 nations
- Winning time: 1:01.2 OR

Medalists
1st place, gold medalist(s)		Dawn Fraser	Australia
2nd place, silver medalist(s)		Chris von Saltza	United States
3rd place, bronze medalist(s)		Natalie Steward	Great Britain

The women's 100 metre freestyle event at the 1960 Olympic Games took place between August 26 and 29. This swimming event used freestyle swimming, which means that the method of the stroke is not regulated (unlike backstroke, breaststroke, and butterfly events). Nearly all swimmers use the front crawl or a variant of that stroke. Because an Olympic-size swimming pool is 50 metres long, this race consisted of two lengths of the pool.

== Competition format ==
The competition used a three-round (heats, semifinals, final) format. The advancement rule followed the format introduced in 1952. A swimmer's place in the heat was not used to determine advancement; instead, the fastest times from across all heats in a round were used. There were 7 heats of between 6 and 8 swimmers each. The top 24 swimmers advanced to the semifinals. There were 3 semifinals of 8 swimmers each. The top 8 swimmers advanced to the final. Swim-offs were used as necessary to break ties.

== Results ==
=== Heats ===
Five heats were held; the swimmers with the fastest 16 times advanced to the semifinals. Those that advanced are highlighted. This round took place on August 26.

Rank	Heat	Lane	Swimmer	Nation	Time	Notes
1	4	4	Chris von Saltza	United States	1:01.9	Q
2	2	4	Dawn Fraser	Australia	1:02.1	Q
3	5	5	Natalie Steward	Great Britain	1:03.5	Q
4	2	5	Cockie Gastelaars	Netherlands	1:03.9	Q
5	1	4	Ilsa Konrads	Australia	1:04.2	Q
6	5	4	Carolyn Wood	United States	1:04.3	Q
7	1	5	Paola Saini	Italy	1:04.4	Q
7	5	6	Erica Terpstra	Netherlands	1:04.4	Q
9	3	4	Csilla Madarász-Bajnogel-Dobai	Hungary	1:04.5	Q
10	4	3	Ursel Brunner	Germany	1:04.6	Q
11	3	3	Heidi Pechstein	Germany	1:05.1	Q
12	1	6	Katalin Boros	Hungary	1:05.2	Q
13	4	6	Héda Frost	France	1:05.8	Q
14	4	5	Mary Stewart	Canada	1:06.0	Q
15	2	3	Inger Thorngren	Sweden	1:06.1	Q
16	1	3	Karin Larsson	Sweden	1:06.3	Q
17	2	6	Yoshiko Sato	Japan	1:06.4	
17	5	3	Marina Shamal	Soviet Union	1:06.4	
19	4	2	Ulvi Voog	Soviet Union	1:06.7	
20	1	2	Maria Cristina Pacifici	Italy	1:07.1	
21	2	7	Nora Novotny	Austria	1:07.4	
22	2	1	Ágústa Þorsteinsdóttir	Iceland	1:07.5	
22	3	6	Diana Wilkinson	Great Britain	1:07.5	
24	3	5	Margaret Iwasaki	Canada	1:07.6	
25	4	1	Haydée Coloso	Philippines	1:07.8	
26	1	7	Blanca Barrón	Mexico	1:07.9	
27	5	2	Marie-Laure Gaillot	France	1:08.0	
28	5	7	Maria Luisa Souza	Mexico	1:08.4	
29	3	7	Anneliese Rockenbach	Venezuela	1:08.5	
30	4	7	Dorothy Sutcliffe	Rhodesia	1:09.0	
31	3	2	Hitomi Jinno	Japan	1:09.8	
32	3	1	Rita Pulido	Spain	1:10.0	

=== Semifinals ===
Two semifinal races were held; the fastest eight swimmers advanced to the Final. The athletes that advanced are highlighted. The semifinals were held August 27.

==== Semifinal 1 ====
Rank	Lane	Name	Nationality	Time	Notes
1	4	Chris von Saltza	United States	1:02.5	
2	5	Natalie Steward	Great Britain	1:02.9	
3	2	Csilla Madarász-Bajnogel-Dobai	Hungary	1:03.0	
4	3	Ilsa Konrads	Australia	1:04.7	
5	1	Héda Frost	France	1:05.4	
6	6	Paola Saini	Italy	1:05.4	
7	8	Inger Thorngren	Sweden	1:05.5	
8	7	Heidi Pechstein	Germany	1:05.6	

==== Semifinal 2 ====
Rank	Lane	Name	Nationality	Time	Notes
1	4	Dawn Fraser	Australia	1:01.4	OR
2	6	Erica Terpstra	Netherlands	1:03.7	
3	5	Cockie Gastelaars	Netherlands	1:03.9	
4	3	Carolyn Wood	United States	1:04.2	
5	1	Mary Stewart	Canada	1:04.2	
6	2	Ursel Brunner	Germany	1:04.5	
7	7	Katalin Boros	Hungary	1:06.2	
8	8	Karin Larsson	Sweden	1:06.5	

=== Final ===
The Final was held on August 29.

Rank	Lane	Athlete	Country	Time	Notes
1	4	Dawn Fraser	Australia	1:01.2	OR
2	5	Chris von Saltza	United States	1:02.8	
3	3	Natalie Steward	Great Britain	1:03.1	
4	1	Carolyn Wood	United States	1:03.4	
5	6	Csilla Madarász-Bajnogel-Dobai	Hungary	1:03.6	
6	2	Erica Terpstra	Netherlands	1:04.3	
7	7	Cockie Gastelaars	Netherlands	1:04.7	
8	8	Mary Stewart	Canada	1:05.5	
