= Tazuko =

- Gender: Female

Origin
- Origin: Japanese
- Meaning: Different meanings depending on the kanji used

Tazuko (written: 多津子, 多鶴子 or 田鶴子) is a feminine Japanese given name. Notable people with the name include:

- Tazuko Abe (阿部 多津子), Japanese table tennis player
- Tazuko Ichikawa (born 1941), American artist
- Tazuko Kikutani (菊谷 多鶴子; born 1947), Japanese swimmer
- Tazuko Sakane (坂根 田鶴子; 1904–1975), Japanese film director
