= Diving at the 1960 Summer Olympics – Men's 3 metre springboard =

Men's 3 metre springboard at the Games of the XVII Olympiad

Medalists
| 1st place, gold medalist(s) | | Gary Tobian | United States |
| 2nd place, silver medalist(s) | | Samuel Hall | United States |
| 3rd place, bronze medalist(s) | | Juan Botella | Mexico |

The men's 3 metre springboard, also reported as 3-metre springboard diving, was one of four diving events on the Diving at the 1960 Summer Olympics programme.

The competition was split into three phases:

1. Preliminary round (27 August)
  Divers performed four voluntary dives without limit of degrees of difficulty. The sixteen divers with the highest scores advanced to the semi-finals.
2. Semi-final (27 August)
  Divers performed three voluntary dives without limit of degrees of difficulty. The eight divers with the highest combined scores from the preliminary round and semi-final advanced to the final.
3. Final (29 August)
  Divers performed three voluntary dives without limit of degrees of difficulty. The final ranking was determined by the combined score from all three rounds.

== Results ==
| Rank | Diver | Nation | Preliminary | | Semi-final | | | | Final | | |
| Rank | Diver | Nation | Points | Rank | Points | Rank | Total | Rank | Points | Rank | Total |
|---|---|---|---|---|---|---|---|---|---|---|---|
| 1st place, gold medalist(s) | Gary Tobian | United States | 62.03 | 2 | 45.30 | 3 | 107.33 | 2 | 62.64 | 1 | 170.00 |
| 2nd place, silver medalist(s) | Sam Hall | United States | 62.16 | 1 | 45.33 | 2 | 107.49 | 1 | 59.59 | 2 | 167.08 |
| 3rd place, bronze medalist(s) | Juan Botella | Mexico | 60.66 | 3 | 46.30 | 1 | 106.96 | 3 | 55.34 | 4 | 162.30 |
| 4 | Álvaro Gaxiola | Mexico | 54.89 | 6 | 39.78 | 8 | 94.67 | 6 | 55.75 | 3 | 150.42 |
| 5 | Ernest Meissner | Canada | 53.62 | 8 | 40.61 | 6 | 94.23 | 7 | 49.84 | 5 | 144.07 |
| 6 | Lamberto Mari | Italy | 55.04 | 5 | 41.45 | 4 | 96.49 | 4 | 47.48 | 6 | 143.97 |
| 7 | Toshio Yamano | Japan | 52.84 | 12 | 41.24 | 5 | 94.08 | 8 | 46.38 | 7 | 140.46 |
| 8 | Hans-Dieter Pophal | United Team of Germany | 55.10 | 4 | 38.81 | 11 | 94.91 | 5 | 39.04 | 8 | 133.95 |
| 9 | Georges Senecot | France | 53.93 | 7 | 38.54 | 14 | 92.47 | 9 | did not advance | | |
| 10 | Walter Messa | Italy | 53.47 | 9 | 38.81 | 11 | 92.28 | 10 | did not advance | | |
| 11 | Rudolf Oertel | United Team of Germany | 51.80 | 15 | 40.10 | 7 | 91.90 | 11 | did not advance | | |
| 12 | Yury Melnikov | Soviet Union | 53.30 | 10 | 38.56 | 13 | 91.86 | 12 | did not advance | | |
| 13 | Johnny Hellström | Sweden | 51.91 | 14 | 39.40 | 9 | 91.31 | 13 | did not advance | | |
| 14 | Göran Lundqvist | Sweden | 52.36 | 13 | 38.87 | 10 | 91.23 | 14 | did not advance | | |
| 15 | Kurt Mrkwicka | Austria | 53.12 | 11 | 37.61 | 16 | 90.73 | 15 | did not advance | | |
| 16 | Graham Deuble | Australia | 51.48 | 16 | 37.78 | 15 | 89.26 | 16 | did not advance | | |
| 17 | Vyacheslav Chernyshov | Soviet Union | 50.87 | 17 | did not advance | | | | | | |
| 18 | Christian Pire | France | 50.49 | 18 | did not advance | | | | | | |
| 19 | Peter Huber | Austria | 50.46 | 19 | did not advance | | | | | | |
| 20 | Peter Squires | Great Britain | 50.23 | 20 | did not advance | | | | | | |
| 21 | Tomáš Bauer | Czechoslovakia | 49.92 | 21 | did not advance | | | | | | |
| 22 | Fernando Ribeiro | Brazil | 49.27 | 22 | did not advance | | | | | | |
| 23 | Shunsuke Kaneto | Japan | 47.51 | 23 | did not advance | | | | | | |
| 24 | János Konkoly | Hungary | 46.94 | 24 | did not advance | | | | | | |
| 25 | Jerzy Kowalewski | Poland | 46.54 | 25 | did not advance | | | | | | |
| 26 | Keith Collin | Great Britain | 46.10 | 26 | did not advance | | | | | | |
| 27 | Kenneth Crotty | Australia | 43.40 | 27 | did not advance | | | | | | |
| 28 | Ahmed Moharran | Egypt | 42.98 | 28 | did not advance | | | | | | |
| 29 | Federico Andrade | Colombia | 41.43 | 29 | did not advance | | | | | | |
| 30 | József Dóra | Hungary | 41.21 | 30 | did not advance | | | | | | |
| 31 | Hans Klug | Switzerland | 38.65 | 31 | did not advance | | | | | | |
| 32 | Ali Muheeb | Egypt | 35.79 | 32 | did not advance | | | | | | |

== Sources ==
- The Organizing Committee of the Games of the XVII Olympiad (1960). "The Official Report of the Organizing Committee for the Games of the XVII Olympiad, Rome 1960, Volume II" (PDF). The Organizing Committee of the Games of the XVII Olympiad. pp. pp. 586–8. Archived from the original (pdf) on 13 August 2011.
- Herman de Wael (24 May 2001). "Diving - men's springboard (Rome 1960)".
