= Swimming at the 1959 Pan American Games – Women's 400 metre freestyle =

Women's 400 metre freestyle at the I959 Pan American Games
- Venue: -
- Dates: September 2 (preliminaries), September 6 (finals)

Medalists
| Gold medal | Chris von Saltza | United States |
| Silver medal | Sylvia Ruuska | United States |
| Bronze medal | Donna Graham | United States |

The women's 400 metre freestyle competition of the swimming events at the 1959 Pan American Games took place on 2 September (preliminaries) and 6 September (finals). The last Pan American Games champion was Beth Whittall of Canada.

This race consisted of eight lengths of the pool, with all eight being in the freestyle stroke.

== Results ==
All times are in minutes and seconds.

| KEY: | q | Fastest non-qualifiers | Q | Qualified | GR | Games record | NR | National record | PB | Personal best | SB | Seasonal best |

=== Heats ===
The first round was held on September 2.

| Rank | Heat | Name | Nationality | Time | Notes |
|---|---|---|---|---|---|
| 1 | 1 | Chris von Saltza | United States | 4:58.1 | Q, GR |
| 2 | 2 | Sylvia Ruuska | United States | 5:00.1 | Q |
| 3 | 1 | Donna Graham | United States | 5:11.5 | Q |
| 4 | 1 | Maria Luísa Sousa | Mexico | 5:22.0 | Q |
| 5 | 2 | Blanca Barrón | Mexico | 5:22.4 | Q |
| 6 | 1 | Katy Campbell | Canada | 5:25.1 | Q |
| 7 | 1 | Susan Sangster | Canada | 5:25.7 | Q |
| 8 | 1 | Maria Teixeira | Brazil | 5:37.2 | Q |
| - | 2 | Lilian Moreira | Brazil | 5:40.1 | |
| - | 2 | Glória Funaro | Brazil | 5:46.4 | |

=== Final ===
The final was held on September 6.

| Rank | Name | Nationality | Time | Notes |
|---|---|---|---|---|
| 1st place, gold medalist(s) | Chris von Saltza | United States | 4:55.9 | GR |
| 2nd place, silver medalist(s) | Sylvia Ruuska | United States | 5:03.4 | |
| 3rd place, bronze medalist(s) | Donna Graham | United States | 5:03.5 | |
| 4 | Katy Campbell | Canada | 5:19.8 | |
| 5 | Blanca Barrón | Mexico | 5:20.0 | |
| 6 | Maria Luísa Sousa | Mexico | 5:21.5 | |
| 7 | - | - | - | |
| 8 | Glória Funaro | Brazil | 5:44.0 | |
