= Swimming at the 1960 Summer Olympics – Women's 400 metre freestyle =

Women's 400 metre freestyle at the Games of the XVII Olympiad
- Venue: Stadio Olimpico del Nuoto
- Date: 31 August 1960 (heats); 1 September 1960 (final)
- Competitors: 22 from 13 nations
- Winning time: 4:50.6 OR

Medalists
1st place, gold medalist(s)		Chris von Saltza	United States
2nd place, silver medalist(s)		Jane Cederqvist	Sweden
3rd place, bronze medalist(s)		Tineke Lagerberg	Netherlands

The women's 400 metre freestyle event at the 1960 Olympic Games took place between 31 August and 1 September. This swimming event used freestyle swimming, which means that the method of the stroke is not regulated (unlike backstroke, breaststroke, and butterfly events). Nearly all swimmers use the front crawl or a variant of that stroke. Because an Olympic size swimming pool is 50 metres long, this race consisted of eight lengths of the pool.

== Results ==
=== Heats ===
Heat 1

Rank	Athlete	Country	Time	Note
1	Chris von Saltza	United States	4:53.6	
2	Tineke Lagerberg	Netherlands	4:57.0	
3	Bibbi Segerström	Sweden	4:57.6	
4	Gisela Weiß	Germany	5:08.6	
5	Judy Samuel	Great Britain	5:12.9	
6	Paola Saini	Italy	5:13.1	
7	Kimiko Ezaka	Japan	5:26.8	
8	Eiko Wada	Japan	5:26.8	

Heat 2

Rank	Athlete	Country	Time	Note
1	Ilsa Konrads	Australia	4:59.2	
2	Corrie Schimmel	Netherlands	5:00.1	
3	Héda Frost	France	5:00.6	
4	Carolyn House	United States	5:00.7	
5	Hillary Wilson	Rhodesia	5:16.8	
6	María Luisa Souza	Mexico	5:21.3	
7	Sigrid Müller	Austria	5:25.1	

Heat 3

Rank	Athlete	Country	Time	Note
1	Jane Cederqvist	Sweden	4:55.6	
2	Nan Rae	Great Britain	4:55.7	
3	Dawn Fraser	Australia	4:57.6	
4	Ursel Brunner	Germany	5:05.3	
5	Welleda Veschi	Italy	5:18.3	
6	Mária Frank	Hungary	5:21.9	
7	Blanca Barrón	Mexico	5:26.4	

=== Final ===
Rank	Athlete	Country	Time	Notes
1	Chris von Saltza	United States	4:50.6	OR
2	Jane Cederqvist	Sweden	4:53.9	
3	Tineke Lagerberg	Netherlands	4:56.9	
4	Ilsa Konrads	Australia	4:57.9	
5	Dawn Fraser	Australia	4:58.5	
6	Nan Rae	Great Britain	4:59.7	
7	Corrie Schimmel	Netherlands	5:02.3	
8	Bibbi Segerström	Sweden	5:02.4	

Key: OR = Olympic record
