= Swimming at the 1963 Pan American Games – Women's 100 metre freestyle =

Women's 100 metre freestyle at the 1963 Pan American Games
- Venue: -

Medalists
Gold medal	Terri Stickles	United States
Silver medal	Mary Stewart	Canada
Bronze medal	Kathleen Ellis	United States

The women's 100 metre freestyle competition of the swimming events at the 1963 Pan American Games took place on April. The last Pan American Games champion was Chris von Saltza of US.

This race consisted of two lengths of the pool, both lengths being in freestyle.

== Results ==
All times are in minutes and seconds.

KEY:	q	Fastest non-qualifiers	Q	Qualified	GR	Games record	NR	National record	PB	Personal best	SB	Seasonal best

=== Final ===
The final was held on April.

Rank	Name	Nationality	Time	Notes
1st place, gold medalist(s)	Terri Stickles	United States	1:02.8	
2nd place, silver medalist(s)	Mary Stewart	Canada	1:03.3	
3rd place, bronze medalist(s)	Kathleen Ellis	United States	1:03.5	
4	Madelaine Sevigny	Canada	1:06.2	
5	Anita Lallande	Puerto Rico	1:08.2	
6	Maria Luísa Sousa	Mexico	1:09.2	
7	-	-	-	
8	-	-	-	
