= Carolyn Wood (swimmer) =

American swimmer

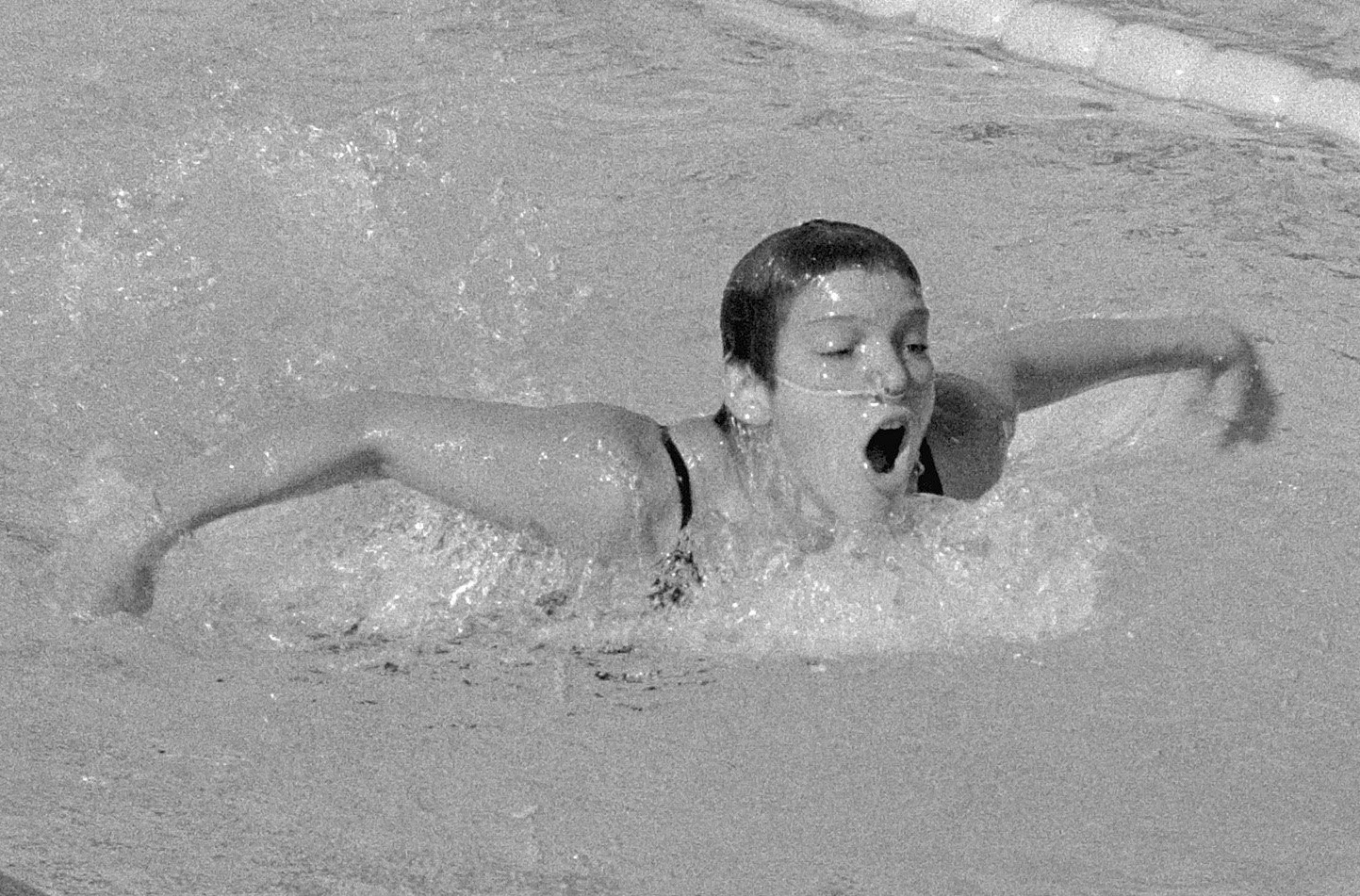
- Wood at the 1960 Olympics

Personal information
- Full name: Carolyn Virginia Wood
- National team: United States
- Born: December 18, 1945 (age 80) Portland, Oregon, U.S.
- Height: 5 ft 6 in (1.68 m)
- Weight: 132 lb (60 kg)

Sport
- Sport: Swimming
- Strokes: Butterfly, freestyle
- Club: Multnomah Athletic Club
- Coach: Olive McKean (Multnomah)
Medal record
Representing the United States
Olympic Games
Gold medal – first place	1960 Rome	4×100 m freestyle relay

Carolyn Virginia Wood (born December 18, 1945) is an American former competition swimmer, Olympic champion, and former world record-holder. She would later work as an English High School teacher.

== Early years ==
Wood was born in Portland, Oregon, and swam for the Multnomah Athletic Club and for Beaverton High School, where she won seven individual state championships in butterfly, freestyle and the individual medley. At the Multnomah Athletic Club, one of her primary coaches was 1936 Olympic silver medalist Olive McKean. Swimming for MAC at the AAU Oregon Girls' Swimming Championships in February 1961, Jamison set a new Oregon state record for 15-16 year olds in the 100-yard butterfly of 1:12.2, breaking the former state record by 9 seconds.

== 1960 Olympics ==
At the 1960 U.S. Olympic Trials, Wood finished first in the 100-meter butterfly event and was favored to win the gold medal in the event at the Olympics. At the 1960 Summer Olympics in Rome, however, during the women's 100-meter butterfly finals, she accidentally swallowed water during the turn and did not finish the race. She did win a gold medal as a member of the winning U.S. team in the women's 4×100-meter freestyle relay, together with teammates Joan Spillane, Shirley Stobs and Chris von Saltza. She swam the crucial third leg of the relay, during which she caught up to and passed Australian swimmer Lorraine Crapp and gave a two-foot lead to anchor swimmer von Saltza, who finished the relay in first place to give the Americans the gold medal. The U.S. relay team set a new world record of 4:08.9 in the event final—nine seconds faster than the previous record.

Wood also swam for the gold medal-winning U.S. team in the 4×100-meter medley relay, but under the international swimming rules in effect in 1960, she did not receive a medal because she did not swim in the event final. Individually, she competed in the 100-meter freestyle, and finished fourth in the event final with a time of 1:03.4. Wood, at 14 years old, was the youngest member of the 1960 U.S. Olympic team to win a medal.

== Life after swimming ==
Following the Olympics, Wood returned to her hometown of Portland, Oregon, where she attended Beaverton High School. During one summer, she worked as a lifeguard and was ruled a professional, and was therefore ineligible to swim in college or in subsequent Olympic Games. Wood attended the University of Oregon and graduated Phi Beta Kappa before becoming an English teacher. She taught at both Beaverton High School and Wilson High School in Portland.

She was inducted into the Oregon Sports Hall of Fame in 1992. Wood's autobiography, Tough Girl: An Olympian's Journey, was released in the autumn of 2016. Wood wrote a follow-up about her year as a governess for Robert F. Kennedy's family following his death in 1968 and her early experiences as a teacher. Titled Class Notes: A Young Teacher's Lessons From Classroom to Kennedy Compound, the book was published in the summer of 2021.

== See also ==
- List of Olympic medalists in swimming (women)
- List of University of Oregon alumni
- World record progression 4 × 100 metres freestyle relay
