= Annie Caron =

Annie Caron may refer to:

- Annie Caron (soccer)
- Annie Caron (swimmer)
