= Temesvári =

Temesvári is a Hungarian surname. Temesvár is a Hungarian name of Timișoara. Notable people with the surname include:

- Andrea Temesvári (born 1966), Hungarian tennis player
- Anna Temesvári (born 1943), Hungarian swimmer
- Ferenc Temesvári (1916–?), Hungarian middle distance
- Miklós Temesvári (born 1938), Hungarian football player and manager
- Ottó Temesvári (born 1934), Hungarian basketball player
