= Swimming at the 1964 Summer Olympics – Women's 400 metre freestyle =

Women's 400 metre freestyle at the Games of the XVIII Olympiad
- Venue: Yoyogi National Gymnasium
- Dates: 14 October 1964 (heats); 15 October 1964 (final)
- Competitors: 40 from 25 nations
- Winning time: 4:43.3 OR

Medalists
| 1st place, gold medalist(s) | | Ginny Duenkel | United States |
| 2nd place, silver medalist(s) | | Marilyn Ramenofsky | United States |
| 3rd place, bronze medalist(s) | | Terri Stickles | United States |

The women's 400 metre freestyle event at the 1964 Olympic Games took place between 17 and 18 October. This swimming event used freestyle swimming, which means that the method of the stroke is not regulated (unlike backstroke, breaststroke, and butterfly events). Nearly all swimmers use the front crawl or a variant of that stroke. Because an Olympic-size swimming pool is 50 metres long, this race consisted of eight lengths of the pool.

== Results ==
=== Heats ===
Heat 1

| Rank | Athlete | Country | Time | Note |
|---|---|---|---|---|
| 1 | Ginny Duenkel | United States | 4:48.6 | |
| 2 | Martina Grunert | Germany | 4:57.7 | |
| 3 | Ineke Tigelaar | Netherlands | 5:01.8 | |
| 4 | Barbara Hounsell | Canada | 5:04.9 | |
| 5 | Tazuko Kikutani | Japan | 5:06.3 | |

Heat 2

| Rank | Athlete | Country | Time | Note |
|---|---|---|---|---|
| 1 | Kim Herford | Australia | 4:49.8 | |
| 2 | Ann-Charlotte Lilja | Sweden | 4:52.3 | |
| 3 | Patty Thompson | Canada | 5:06.7 | |
| 4 | Pauline Sillett | Great Britain | 5:12.2 | |
| 5 | Bep Weeteling | Netherlands | 5:13.0 | |

Heat 3

| Rank | Athlete | Country | Time | Note |
|---|---|---|---|---|
| 1 | Liz Long | Great Britain | 4:54.5 | |
| 2 | Daniela Beneck | Italy | 4:56.2 | |
| 3 | Elisabeth Ljunggren-Morris | Sweden | 4:57.0 | |
| 4 | Jutta Wanke | Germany | 5:01.7 | |
| 5 | Ann Lallande | Puerto Rico | 5:04.3 | |
| 6 | Rita Pulido | Spain | 5:06.2 | |
| 7 | Marilyn Sidelsky | Zimbabwe | 5:08.9 | |

Heat 4

| Rank | Athlete | Country | Time | Note |
|---|---|---|---|---|
| 1 | Marilyn Ramenofsky | United States | 4:47.7 | |
| 2 | Dawn Fraser | Australia | 4:52.2 | |
| 3 | Jane Hughes | Canada | 4:54.8 | |
| 4 | Nataliya Bystrova | Soviet Union | 5:05.0 | |
| 5 | María Luisa Souza | Mexico | 5:05.2 | |
| 6 | Majvor Welander | Sweden | 5:07.7 | |
| 7 | Olga Belmar | Mexico | 5:14.0 | |
| 8 | Jovina Tseng | Malaysia | 5:46.0 | |

Heat 5

| Rank | Athlete | Country | Time | Note |
|---|---|---|---|---|
| 1 | Terri Lee Stickles | United States | 4:49.3 | |
| 2 | Nanette Duncan | Australia | 4:55.2 | |
| 3 | Kazue Hayakawa | Japan | 4:56.5 | |
| 4 | Heidi Pechstein | Germany | 5:01.4 | |
| 5 | Nataliya Mikhaylova | Soviet Union | 5:08.0 | |
| 6 | Im Geum-ja | South Korea | 5:38.7 | |

=== Final ===
| Rank | Athlete | Country | Time | Notes |
|---|---|---|---|---|
| 1 | Ginny Duenkel | United States | 4:43.3 | OR |
| 2 | Marilyn Ramenofsky | United States | 4:44.6 | |
| 3 | Terri Stickles | United States | 4:47.2 | |
| 4 | Dawn Fraser | Australia | 4:47.6 | |
| 5 | Jane Hughes | Canada | 4:50.9 | |
| 6 | Liz Long | Great Britain | 4:52.0 | |
| 7 | Kim Herford | Australia | 4:52.9 | |
| 8 | Ann-Charlotte Lilja | Sweden | 4:53.0 | |

Key: OR = Olympic record
