= Swimming at the 1959 Pan American Games – Women's 200 metre freestyle =

Women's 200 metre freestyle at the I959 Pan American Games
- Venue: -
- Dates: August 31 (preliminaries), September 3 (finals)

Medalists
| Gold medal | Chris von Saltza | United States |
| Silver medal | Shirley Stobs | United States |
| Bronze medal | Joan Spillane | United States |

The women's 200 metre freestyle competition of the swimming events at the 1959 Pan American Games took place on 31 August (preliminaires) and 3 September (finals). The last Pan American Games champion was Wanda Werner of US.

This race consisted of four lengths of the pool, all in freestyle.

== Results ==
All times are in minutes and seconds.

| KEY: | q | Fastest non-qualifiers | Q | Qualified | GR | Games record | NR | National record | PB | Personal best | SB | Seasonal best |

=== Heats ===
The first round was held on August 31.

| Rank | Heat | Name | Nationality | Time | Notes |
|---|---|---|---|---|---|
| 1 | 1 | Chris von Saltza | United States | 2:20.3 | Q, GR |
| - | - | Shirley Stobs | United States | - | Q |
| - | - | Joan Spillane | United States | - | Q |
| - | - | Margaret Iwasaki | Canada | - | Q |
| - | - | Sara Barber | Canada | - | Q |
| - | - | Maria Luísa Sousa | Mexico | - | Q |
| 7 | - | Blanca Barrón | Mexico | - | Q |
| 8 | - | Susan Sangster | Canada | - | Q |
| 9 | - | Maria Teixeira | Brazil | 2:38.4 | |
| 11 | - | Lilian Moreira | Brazil | 2:39.4 | |
| 13 | - | Glória Funaro | Brazil | 2:44.5 | |

=== Final ===
The final was held on September 3.

| Rank | Name | Nationality | Time | Notes |
|---|---|---|---|---|
| 1st place, gold medalist(s) | Chris von Saltza | United States | 2:18.5 | GR |
| 2nd place, silver medalist(s) | Shirley Stobs | United States | 2:22.9 | |
| 3rd place, bronze medalist(s) | Joan Spillane | United States | 2:23.0 | |
| 4 | Blanca Barrón | Mexico | 2:29.4 | |
| 5 | Margaret Iwasaki | Canada | 2:29.4 | |
| 6 | Maria Luísa Sousa | Mexico | 2:33.2 | |
| 7 | Susan Sangster | Canada | - | |
| 8 | Maria Teixeira | Brazil | 2:38.5 | |
