= Swimming at the 1959 Pan American Games – Women's 100 metre freestyle =

Women's 100 metre freestyle at the I959 Pan American Games
- Venue: -
- Dates: September 1 (preliminaries), September 4 (finals)

Medalists
Gold medal	Chris von Saltza	United States
Silver medal	Molly Botkin	United States
Bronze medal	Joan Spillane	United States

The women's 100 metre freestyle competition of the swimming events at the 1959 Pan American Games took place on 1 September (preliminaries) and 4 September (finals). The last Pan American Games champion was Helen Stewart of Canada.

This race consisted of two lengths of the pool, both lengths being in freestyle.

== Results ==
All times are in minutes and seconds.

KEY:	q	Fastest non-qualifiers	Q	Qualified	GR	Games record	NR	National record	PB	Personal best	SB	Seasonal best

=== Heats ===
The first round was held on September 1.

Rank	Heat	Name	Nationality	Time	Notes
1	2	Chris von Saltza	United States	1:04.2	Q, GR
2	2	Joan Spillane	United States	1:05.3	Q
3	1	Molly Botkin	United States	1:06.2	Q
4	2	Margaret Iwasaki	Canada	1:06.3	Q
5	1	Blanca Barrón	Mexico	1:07.6	Q
6	1	Maria Luísa Sousa	Mexico	1:08.2	Q
7	1	Helen Hunt	Canada	1:08.5	Q
8	2	Sandra Scott	Canada	1:09.4	Q
-	-	Maria Teixeira	Brazil	1:11.6	
-	-	Glória Funaro	Brazil	1:11.9	
-	-	Lílian Moreira	Brazil	1:12.8	

=== Final ===
The final was held on September 4.

Rank	Name	Nationality	Time	Notes
1st place, gold medalist(s)	Chris von Saltza	United States	1:03.8	GR
2nd place, silver medalist(s)	Molly Botkin	United States	1:05.7	
3rd place, bronze medalist(s)	Joan Spillane	United States	1:05.8	
4	Margaret Iwasaki	Canada	1:06.0	
5	Blanca Barrón	Mexico	1:08.5	
6	Maria Luísa Sousa	Mexico	1:08.8	
6	Sandra Scott	Canada	1:08.8	
8	-	-	-	
