= Wanke =

Wanke may refer to:

- Daouda Malam Wanké (1946–2004), military and political leader in Niger
- Joachim Wanke (1941–2026), German Roman Catholic bishop
- Jutta Wanke (born 1948), German swimmer
- Larry Wanke, American football player
- 5762 Wänke, main belt asteroid

== See also ==
- Vanke
