= Shirley Stobs =

American swimmer (born 1942)

Personal information
- Full name: Shirley Anne Stobs
- National team: United States
- Born: May 20, 1942 (age 84) Miami, Florida, U.S.
- Education: Emory University
- Height: 5 ft 4 in (1.63 m)
- Weight: 123 lb (56 kg)

Sport
- Sport: Swimming
- Strokes: Freestyle; Butterfly
- Club: Miami Shores Country Club
- Coach: Tom Buckley (Miami Shores)
Medal record
Women's swimming
Representing the United States
Olympic Games
Gold medal – first place	1960 Rome	4×100 m freestyle
Pan American Games
Gold medal – first place	1959 Chicago	4×100 m freestyle
Silver medal – second place	1959 Chicago	200 m freestyle

Shirley Anne Stobs (born May 20, 1942), later Shirley Anne Davis is an American former competition swimmer, Olympic champion, and former world record-holder.

== Early life ==
Born May 20, 1942, in Miami, Florida, to Mr. and Mrs. Donald Stobs, Shirley swam for the Miami Shores Country Club under Coach Tom Buckley who later coached at Dade Junior College in the early 1970's. In June, 1957, Stobs set a Florida state record for the 100-yard butterfly in the 15-16 age group category with a time of 1:08.5 at the St Petersburg Invitational Meet. Stobs attended Miami Edison Senior High School, where on May 10, 1958, at the Florida State High School Championships, while representing Edison, she won the 100-yard freestyle event in a time of 57.9, and set an age-group record in the preliminaries of the 100-yard butterfly of 1:07.0.

At the Florida Age Group Swimming Championships in June, 1958, Stobs set a National 50-yard girls freestyle record of 26.4 seconds, also winning the 200-yard individual medley. She set an unofficial Florida State Record in the 100-yard freestyle in June 1960 of 58.1.

In 1959, she captured an AAU title in the 100 yd freestyle, underscoring her potential as an Olympic candidate in the event.

== 1960 Rome Olympic gold ==
Swimming the 100-meter freestyle, Stobs placed fourth at the 1960 Olympic trials to qualify for the Olympics.

She competed at the 1960 Olympic Games in Rome, where she received a gold medal as a member of the winning U.S. team in the women's 4×100-meter freestyle relay, together with her teammates Joan Spillane, Carolyn Wood and Chris von Saltza. Swimming second, Stobs set her best personal time for her 100 meter leg, with a 1:02.9. She and her relay teammates outpaced the strong Australian team that took the silver. The American women set a new world record in the 4x100 freestyle with a combined time of 4:08.9 in the event final.

At the Pan American Games in Chicago in 1959, she captured a gold medal in the 4x100 freestyle. She also placed second, winning a silver medal in the 200 freestyle at the Pan Am Games that year. She competed at the 1959 Pan American Games, winning gold in the 4x100 freestyle, and a silver medal in the 200 metre freestyle.

After the Olympics, Stobs attended Emory University in the Fall of 1960.

In 1996, Stobbs participated in the Olympic Torch Relay while a resident of Indian River, Florida.

== See also ==
- List of Olympic medalists in swimming (women)
- World record progression 4 × 100 metres freestyle relay
