= Olga Belmar =

Mexican swimmer (born 1946)

Personal information
- Born: 22 September 1946
- Died: 25 May 2024 (aged 77) Mexico

Sport
- Sport: Swimming

Olga Belmar (born 22 September 1946) is a Mexican former swimmer. She competed in the women's 400 metre freestyle at the 1964 Summer Olympics.
