= Ágústa Þorsteinsdóttir =

Icelandic swimmer

Personal information
- Born: 17 April 1942 Reykjavík, Iceland
- Died: 21 August 2008 (aged 66) Reykjavík, Iceland

Sport
- Sport: Swimming

Ágústa Þorsteinsdóttir (17 April 1942 – 21 August 2008) was an Icelandic swimmer. She competed in the women's 100 metre freestyle at the 1960 Summer Olympics, where she was eliminated in the heats.

Ágústa was born in Reykjavík to Þorsteins Kristjánssonar and Sigríðar Finnbogadóttur. She started swimming when she was 14 years old and within a year she had set 11 Icelandic national records. When Ágústa was 18 years old, she represented Iceland at the 1960 Summer Olympics in Rome, Italy, competing in the 100 metre freestyle. In her first round heat, Ágústa was up against Dawn Fraser, the eventual gold medallist. She finished her heat in sixth place in a time of 1:07.5, putting her in 22nd place overall so she did not qualify for the next round.

In her swimming career she broke 52 national records and was nominated sportswoman of the year four times. She also had a talent in Handball and played for KR.

In 1988, Ágústa took up the sport of ten-pin bowling and competed with the KRF Afturgöngunum team. Her team became Icelandic champions 11 times and individually she became Icelandic champion in 1992, 1995 and 1996. She was still competing in spring 2008. Ágústa died in August 2008, leaving her husband and two adult children.
