= Federico Andrade =

Colombian diver (born 1940)

Personal information
- Nationality: Colombian
- Born: 18 September 1940 (age 85) Palmira, Colombia

Sport
- Sport: Diving

Federico Andrade (born 18 September 1940) is a Colombian diver. He competed in the men's 3 metre springboard event at the 1960 Summer Olympics.
