= Hans Klug =

Swiss diver

Personal information
- Nationality: Swiss
- Born: 16 February 1938 (age 88) St. Gallen, Switzerland

Sport
- Sport: Diving

Hans Klug (born 16 February 1938) is a Swiss diver. He competed in the men's 3 metre springboard event at the 1960 Summer Olympics.
