= Ruth Everuss =

Australian swimmer

Personal information
- Nationality: Australian
- Born: 4 August 1944 (age 82) Sydney, Australia

Sport
- Sport: Swimming
Medal record
Swimming
British Empire and Commonwealth Games
Gold medal – first place	1962 Perth	Women's 4×110 yd Freesyle Relay

Ruth Everuss (born 4 August 1944) is an Australian former swimmer. She competed in the women's 4 × 100 metre freestyle relay at the 1960 Summer Olympics in Italy, Rome.
