= Irina Lyakhovskaya =

Russian swimmer

Personal information
- Nationality: Russian
- Born: 2 March 1941 Leningrad, Soviet Union
- Died: 2003 (aged 61–62)

Sport
- Sport: Swimming

Irina Lyakhovskaya (2 March 1941 – 2003) was a Russian freestyle swimmer. She competed in the women's 4 × 100 metre freestyle relay at the 1960 Summer Olympics for the Soviet Union.
