= Rita Pulido =

Spanish swimmer

Personal information
- Full name: Rita Pulido Castro
- Born: 25 April 1945 (age 81) Las Palmas, Spain

Sport
- Sport: Swimming

Rita Pulido Castro (Note: In this Spanish name, the first or paternal surname is Pulido and the second or maternal family name is Castro.) (born 25 April 1945) is a Spanish former swimmer. She competed at the 1960 Summer Olympics and the 1964 Summer Olympics.

Pulido was 11 years old when she started to swim. Two years later, she had a swimming coach, and by the time she was 15 years old, she was picked for the 1960 Summer Olympics. She became the first Canarian to compete at the Olympics. She competed in the 100 metre freestyle, where even though she came last out of all the 32 competitors, her time of 1:10.0 was a new Spanish record.

Four years later, she competed in two events at the 1964 Summer Olympics in Tokyo. In the 100 metre freestyle, she swam a time of 1:06.7 and finished seventh, so she didn't qualify for the next round. She also competed in the 400 metre freestyle, and although she didn't qualify for the final, she did beat 10 of the other women's time in the heats.

Then, not long after her final Olympic appearance, she retired just at the age of 19. She was then married and had five children and 10 grandchildren. In just seven years of swimming, she had competed in 48 international events. One of her children, Natalia Pulido, also competed in swimming at the 1992 Summer Olympics, making them the only mother-daughter couple to compete for the Spanish Olympic Team.
