= Terri Stickles =

American swimmer (born 1946)

- Stickles circa 1966

Personal information
- Full name: Terri Lee Stickles
- Born: May 11, 1946 (age 80) San Mateo, California, U.S.
- Height: 5 ft 10 in (178 cm)
- Weight: 150 lb (68 kg)

Sport
- Country: United States
- Sport: Swimming
- Strokes: Freestyle, distance
- Club: San Mateo Marlins; Santa Clara Swim Club
- Coach: George Haines (Santa Clara)
Medal record
Women's swimming
Representing the United States
Olympic Games
Bronze medal – third place	1964 Tokyo	400 m freestyle
Pan American Games
Gold medal – first place	1963 São Paulo	100 m freestyle
Silver medal – second place	1963 São Paulo	200 m freestyle

Terri Lee Stickles (born May 11, 1946) is an American former competition swimmer, Olympic medalist, and former world record-holder.

Terri Stickles was born May 11, 1946 in San Mateo, California, to Edward A. Stickles, a West Coast credit manager for a large clothing store, and Olive W. Stickles, a physical education teacher and former coach. By the age of ten, Terri began her competitive training with the San Mateo Marlins, a quality age-group team coached by Ray Taft, a former 1940 National medley champion, who also coached Terri's brother Ted at a young age. Terri attended San Mateo's Hillsdale High School, where as a Freshman at 15, she competed and excelled as a member of the women's swim team. An early athletic pursuit for Terri included skating with the roller derby, though her mother Olive had an understandable preference for swimming, and believed Ray Taft was an important influence in her daughter's early development as a swimmer. Coach Taft would later become President and Coach of the San Mateo Aquatic Club in 1969, well after Terri had moved to San Jose.

After her Freshman year, Terri left San Mateo and the Marlins and transferred to Blackford High School, now known as Boynton High School in San Jose to be closer to the coaching available with the Santa Clara Swim Club. She eventually graduated Santa Clara High School, in June, 1964, with a high grade-point average.

== Santa Clara swim club ==
She trained intensely and competed with the Santa Clara Swim Club, where she was managed and directed by Hall of Fame Head Coach George Haines. Her Santa Clara workouts could be demanding particularly during the summer months which could include as many as three sessions, with an 8:00-10:00 am morning workout, a mid-day noon-1:00 pm workout, and an evening 4:00-6:00 pm workout. During her career with Santa Clara, she won four American Athletic Union (AAU) individual titles. At 16 in December 1962, Stickles made the All America team in the 100-yard and 100-meter freestyle, the 250-yard and 250 meter freestyle, the 500-yard and 400-meter freestyle, and the 400-yard and 400-meter medley relay. At the San Leandro Relays in June, 1963, Stickles broke the American record for the 500-yard freestyle with a time of 5:25.1, placing first in the event.

Stickles was one of five young women swimmers on the Santa Clara club that qualified for the 1964 U.S. Olympic team, that included Donna de Varona, Judy Reeder, Pokey Watson, and Claudia Kolb.

== 1964 Tokyo Olympic bronze medal ==
Despite an injury from a minor car accident shortly before the 1964 Olympic trails in Astoria, New York which affected her training for ten days, Stickles qualified for the 1964 Olympics by finishing second to Marilyn Ramenofsky in the 400-meter New York Olympic trial finals in world record time.

After travelling to Tokyo with the team, Stickles received a bronze medal for her third-place finish in the women's 400-meter freestyle event at the 1964 Summer Olympics in Tokyo, Japan. Stickles was part of a medal sweep for the American team in the 400-meter event with her third-place time of 4:47.2, finishing behind Americans Ginny Duenkel who finished in 4:43.3, and Marilyn Ramenofsky who had a time of 4:44.6, 2.6 seconds ahead of Stickles. Stickles edged out Australian Dawn Fraser who took fourth by a margin of only .6 seconds.

=== Post-swimming careers ===
After her swimming career, Stickles attended Indiana University, but left to join the Peace Corps. She took twelve weeks of training for the Peace Corps at the University of New Mexico, completing it in May 1966. After training for another month in Bogata, Columbia, she was assigned to teach English, physical education, and work in educational television. She was married to long-distance runner and three-time Olympic participant Álvaro Mejía in mid-1968, having met him in Cali, Colombia, while she was serving as a Peace Corps volunteer. While serving in the Peace Corps, she coached Columbia's national swim team. Ending her time with the Peace Corps, Stickles brought Mejía to the San Francisco Bay Area in 1969. They had two sons around the early 1970's, but later divorced. Stickles later worked as an award winning police officer beginning around 1977 in Redwood City California in the Bay area, just South of San Francisco.

In 1969, before moving to the Bay Area, Stickles briefly coached nine to twelve year olds at the San Mateo Aquatic Club, formerly the San Mateo Marlins where she had formerly trained. She swam with a San Mateo Marlins Masters swim team for several years to remain fit.

Her brother, Ted Stickles, who would coach swimming at Louisiana State, was also a competition swimmer who swam for Indiana University, and set world records in the 200-meter and 400-meter individual medley events.

She is now retired and living in Murphys, California in Calaveras County where she moved in 1985 with her husband Bob Strunck and a son. She has worked as a fused glass artist after taking classes in the medium. She specialized in wearable art, including pendants, earings, bracelets, rings, and money clips. Her work is exhibited at the Calaveras Arts Council “Gallery Calaveras” in San Andreas, California. Around the 1990's her parents moved to Murphys in their late retirement.

== See also ==
- List of Olympic medalists in swimming (women)
- World record progression 4 × 100 metres freestyle relay
