= Ali Muheeb =

Egyptian diver

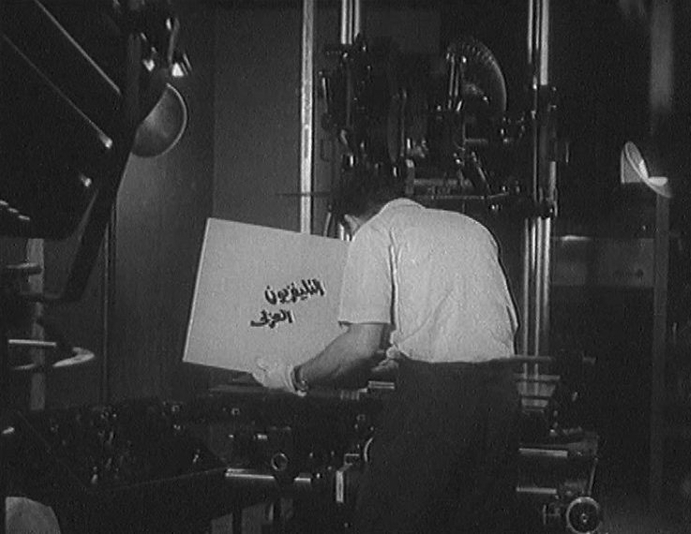
- Muheeb shooting a film in 1962

Personal information
- Nationality: Egyptian
- Born: 26 March 1935 Suez, Kingdom of Egypt
- Died: 26 September 2010 (aged 75) Cairo, Egypt

Sport
- Sport: Diving

Ali Mohamed Muheeb (26 March 1935 – 26 September 2010) was an Egyptian diver and filmmaker. He competed in the men's 3 metre springboard event at the 1960 Summer Olympics. He also was a pioneering figure in the Egyptian animation industry, nicknamed "The Godfather of Egyptian Animation".
