= Galina Sosnova =

Russian swimmer

Personal information
- Nationality: Russian
- Born: 9 May 1944 (age 82) Moscow, Soviet Union

Sport
- Sport: Swimming

Galina Sosnova (born 9 May 1944) is a Russian former swimmer. She competed in the women's 4 × 100 metre freestyle relay at the 1960 Summer Olympics for the Soviet Union.
