= Yury Melnikov =

Russian diver

Personal information
- Nationality: Russian
- Born: 23 May 1940 (age 85) Moscow, Russia

Sport
- Sport: Diving

Yury Melnikov (Russian: Юрий Мельников, born 23 May 1940) is a Russian diver. He competed in the men's 3 metre springboard event at the 1960 Summer Olympics.
