= Johnny Hellström =

Swedish diver (1941–1962)

Personal information
- Full name: Ernst Johnny Hellström
- Nationality: Swedish
- Born: 9 December 1941 Jönköping, Sweden
- Died: 16 January 1962 (aged 20) Jönköping, Sweden

Sport
- Sport: Diving

Ernst Johnny Hellström (9 December 1941 – 16 January 1962) was a Swedish diver. He competed in the men's 3 metre springboard event at the 1960 Summer Olympics.

Hellström represented Stockholms KK.
