= Kenneth Crotty =

Australian diver

Ken Crotty
Personal information
- Full name: Kenneth Crotty
- Nationality: Australian
- Born: 23 October 1938 (age 86); Essendon, Victoria, Australia

Sport
- Sport: Diving

Kenneth Crotty (born 23 October 1938) is an Australian diver. He competed in the men's 3 metre springboard event at the 1960 Summer Olympics.
