= Nora Novotny =

Austrian swimmer

Personal information
- Born: 2 July 1939 (age 87) Vienna, Austria

Sport
- Sport: Swimming

Nora Novotny (born 2 July 1939) is an Austrian former swimmer. She competed in the women's 100 metre freestyle at the 1960 Summer Olympics.
