= Peter Huber (diver) =

Austrian diver

Personal information
- Nationality: Austrian
- Born: 16 February 1930; Vienna, Austria
- Died: 2014 (aged 83–84)

Sport
- Sport: Diving

Peter Huber (16 February 1930 – 2014) was an Austrian diver. He competed in the men's 3 metre springboard event at the 1960 Summer Olympics.
