= Welleda Veschi =

Italian swimmer

Personal information
- Born: 23 June 1943 (age 83) Rome, Italy

Sport
- Sport: Swimming

Welleda Veschi (born 23 June 1943) is an Italian former swimmer. She competed in the women's 400 metre freestyle at the 1960 Summer Olympics.
