= Joan Spillane =

American swimmer

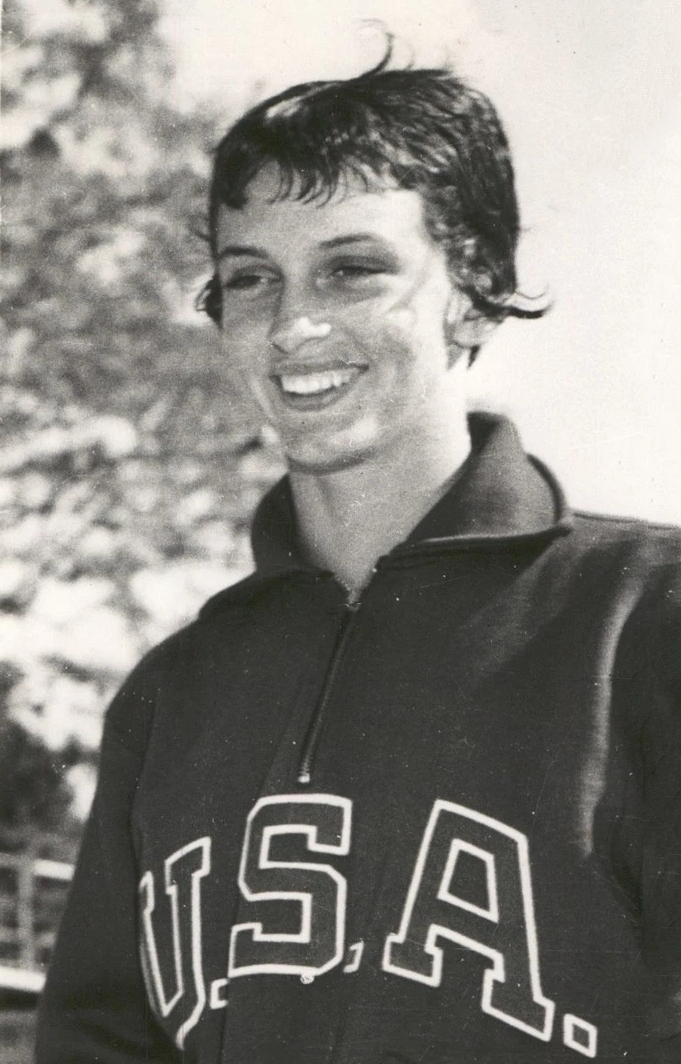
- Spillane in 1960

Personal information
- Full name: Joan Arlene Spillane
- National team: United States
- Born: January 31, 1943 (age 83) Glen Ridge, New Jersey, U.S.
- Education: University of Michigan (1960-62); University of Houston (1964); B.A. Elementary Education
- Occupations: Texas Schoolteacher; Educational administrator
- Height: 5 ft 11 in (1.80 m)
- Weight: 139 lb (63 kg)
- Spouse: Peter Stanley Postma
- Children: 2

Sport
- Sport: Swimming
- Events: 100, 200 freestyle, relays
- Strokes: Freestyle
- Club: Houston's Dad's Club
- Coach: Melvin "Pat" Patterson (Dad's Club)
Medal record
Women's swimming
Representing the United States
Olympic Games
Gold medal – first place	1960 Rome	4×100 m freestyle
Pan American Games
Gold medal – first place	1959 Chicago	4x100 m freestyle
Bronze medal – third place	1959 Chicago	100 m freestyle
Bronze medal – third place	1959 Chicago	200 m freestyle

Joan Arlene Spillane (born January 31, 1943), known by her married name, Joan Spillane Postma after August, 1962, is an American former competition swimmer, 1960 Olympic champion in the 4x100 meter freestyle relay, and a former world record-holder. In her career, Spillane would hold American records in the 440, 200 and 100 yard distances. She attended the University of Michigan on an academic scholarship from 1960 to 1962, and completed her education at the University of Houston in 1964 where she majored in Elementary Education. As Joan Postma, she had a 30-year career as a teacher and educational administrator for the Cypress-Fairbanks Independent School District in Montgomery County, Texas.

== Early life ==
Joan Spillane was born January 31, 1943 in Glen Ridge, New Jersey to father John Hinton and mother Josephine Spillane, the second child and only daughter in a family with three brothers. When her father was transferred by his employer Prudential Insurance to Texas in 1951, the Spillanes made a move to Houston. Joan attended greater Houston's Spring Branch High School, graduating in June, 1960. Her brother Jim also swam in High School, earning a swimming scholarship to the University of Texas, where he would receive honors as an All-American. In addition to swimming, Joan was Captain of the Spring Branch High Bruin Brigade Drill Squad. By 1955, Joan swam at 12 for Houston's Dad's Club in Spring Branch, East of Houston under Head Coach E. A. Snapp, and by 1957 for Melvin "Pat" Patterson, a former swimmer at the University of Texas. Patterson, with whom Spillane credited most of her development, was the first University of Texas swimmer to break 50 seconds for the 100-yard freestyle, which became one of Spillane's signature events. Patterson started as Head swimming coach at Dad's Club in June 1957, with his wife Jane.

At the Texas Amateur Athletic Association Annual Championship meet in the summer of 1959 in Tyler, swimming for Houston's Dads Club, Spillane broke the National AAU Record in the Women's 100-meter butterfly.

Most accomplished in short freestyle events, Spillane won a bronze medal in the 100 meter freestyle and the gold in the 4×100 meter freestyle relay with U.S. teammates Molly Botkin, Shirley Stobs, and Chris von Saltza at the 1959 Pan American Games. She won a second bronze in the 200 meter freestyle.

At the indoor AAU Nationals in Bartlesville, Oklahoma, Spillane took two second places in her freestyle events.

== 1960 Rome Olympics ==
In preparation for the 1960 trials, Spillane swam two hour practices in the morning and a ninety minute practice in the evening on a six day schedule, though her evening practices later extended to two hours in preparation for the Olympics. At the 1960 Olympic Trials on August 2, in Detroit, Spillane finished third in both the 100 and 200 meter freestyle, qualifying for a place on the U.S. Women's Olympic relay teams.

Travelling with the team, Spillane competed at the September, 1960 Summer Olympics in Rome, where she received a gold medal as a member of the winning U.S. team in the women's 4×100-meter freestyle relay, together with teammates Shirley Stobs, Carolyn Wood and Chris von Saltza. Before a crowd of 9,000, Spillane, Stobs, Wood, and Saltza set a new world record in the 4×100-meter freestyle with a combined time of 4:08.9, a full 8 seconds under the former world record. Spillane swam the first leg of the freestyle relay final with a personal best time of 1:02, remaining within a few lengths of Australian team member Dawn Fraser, who swam her leg in a record time of 1:00.25. In the third leg of the final, American Carolyn Wood passed Australian Lorraine Crapp to take the lead by 2.7 seconds, with anchor leg swimmer Chris von Saltza easily maintaining and adding to the American lead to finish with a three length win.

Spillane also swam the freestyle leg for the gold medal-winning U.S. team in the preliminary heats of the women's 4×100-meter medley relay, but she was ineligible for a medal under the 1960 international swimming rules because she did not swim in the event final.

== Education, marriage, careers ==
=== University of Michigan ===
Spillane attended the University of Michigan from 1960 to 1962 on a scholarship, based on academics. When she enrolled on September 18, 1960, she was the first University of Michigan woman to have ever won an Olympic medal. Spillane continued to compete in occasional swimming competitions during her time at Michigan, but did not compete for the University as there was not a women's team at the time, though a women's program was in the works. Spillane swam in an American-Canadian dual invitational meet in Chicago during her years in Michigan, in January 1961, but it was her last meet. According to a 1981 press interview, Spillane noted that she swam competitively for only three months after starting college, and then retired.

Enrolling in 1962, Spillane later completed her education at the University of Houston, receiving a B.A. in Elementary Education in 1964. She was a member of Alpha Xi Delta Sorority during her college years. Still a part of the swimming community, she served as a summer coach at greater Houston's Hansel Swim Academy in 1965.

Joan was married to Peter S. Postma on August 31, 1962 at St. Christopher's Episcopal Church in Houston. Postma graduated Trinity College in Hartford, Connecticut, where he was a member of Delta Phi. After a reception at St. Christopher's Hall, the couple honeymooned at greater Houston's Padre Island. The couple would have later have two children, with the first born in 1967, and the second in 1969. Both children swam competitively in their youth in the Northwest Aquatic Leagues.

=== Educator ===
After her marriage, Joan Spillane Postma had a thirty year career as an educator in Texas. One of her first teaching positions was at a school in Hunter's Creek Village in Greater Houston and in 1976 she was a first grade teacher at Houston's Spring Branch School, close to where she grew up. Joan spent 24 of her three decades in education working for the Cypress-Fairbanks Independent School District (CISD) in Texas's Montgomery County, which includes Houston. She worked for a decade as an eighth-grade math teacher and computer instructor at Bleyl Junior High in Houston, TX, before working as a Cypress-Fairbanks District administrator for microcomputer instruction. She later served as a Director in support of Technology. She retired from her career in Education in 2002.

In 1986, Spillane authored Using Appleworks in the Classroom: For Use on the Apple (Addison-Wesley Computer Applications Series), Postma, Joan, published by Addison Wesley Higher Education, 1987, ISBN 100201218976.

=== Honors ===
Joan Spillane Postma was admitted to the University of Michigan Hall of Honor in November, 2022, and is a member of the Texas Swimming and Diving Hall of Fame. In 1960, she was named Athlete of the Year by Houston's Chamber of Commerce. On her return to Houston from the Rome Olympics, Houston Mayor Luis Cutrer proclaimed September 8, 1960 "Joan Spillane Day" in her honor. Before a crowd of 100,000, Joan, while a student at Michigan, was honored with a medal presentation from the Houston Chamber of Commerce at the Michigan-Illinois Football game in early November 1960, recognizing her as the Houston Athlete of the Year.

As a tribute to her long service as an educator, Postma Elementary in the Cypress-Fairview School District in greater Houston's Cypress, Texas, is named in her honor.

== See also ==
- List of Olympic medalists in swimming (women)
- List of University of Michigan alumni
- World record progression 4 × 100 metres freestyle relay

== See also ==
- Evans, Hilary; Gjerde, Arild; Heijmans, Jeroen; Mallon, Bill; et al. "Joan Spillane". Olympics at Sports-Reference.com. Sports Reference LLC. Archived from the original on May 20, 2011.
