= Hennie van der Velde =

Dutch swimmer

Personal information
- Born: 9 July 1944 (age 82) Utrecht, Netherlands

Sport
- Sport: Swimming

Hennie van der Velde (born 9 July 1944) is a Dutch former swimmer. She competed in the women's 4 × 100 metre freestyle relay at the 1960 Summer Olympics.
