= Christel Steffin =

German swimmer (born 1940)

Personal information
- Born: April 4, 1940 (age 86) Hohen Neuendorf, Havelland District, Germany

Sport
- Sport: Swimming
Medal record
Representing Germany
Olympic Games
Bronze medal – third place	1960 Rome	4x100 m freestyle relay

Christel Steffin (born 4 April 1940) is a German former swimmer who competed in the 1956 Summer Olympics and in the 1960 Summer Olympics.
