= Walter Messa =

Italian diver (born 1939)

Personal information
- Nationality: Italian
- Born: 16 May 1939 (age 86) Milan, Italy

Sport
- Sport: Diving

Walter Messa (born 16 May 1939) is an Italian diver. He competed in the men's 3 metre springboard event at the 1960 Summer Olympics.
