= Kim Herford =

Australian swimmer

Personal information
- Nationality: Australian
- Born: 22 February 1947 (age 79) Manly, New South Wales, Australia

Sport
- Sport: Swimming
Medal record
Women's swimming
Representing Australia
Bronze medal – third place	1966 Kingston	440 yd freestyle

Kim Herford (born 22 February 1947) is an Australian former swimmer. She competed in the women's 400 metre freestyle at the 1964 Summer Olympics.
