= Marilyn Ramenofsky =

American swimmer (born 1946)

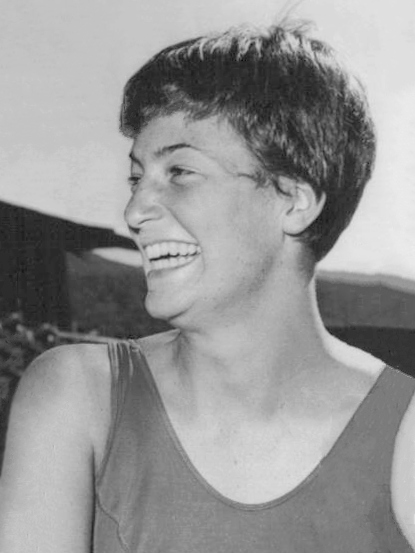
- Ramenofsky at 18 in 1964

Personal information
- Full name: Marilyn Ramenofsky
- National team: United States
- Born: August 20, 1946 (age 80) Phoenix, Arizona, U.S.
- Education: Pomona College ('69, Biology); University of Texas Austin ('72 M.A.); U. of Washington ('82 PHD)
- Occupations: Professor, researcher of Zoology; Vassar, U. of Washington; University California Davis
- Height: 5 ft 7 in (1.70 m)
- Weight: 134 lb (61 kg)
- Spouse: Dr. John C. Wingfield (1979)

Sport
- Sport: Swimming
- Strokes: Freestyle
- Club: Dick Smith Swim Gym; Arizona Desert Rats
- College team: Pomona College
- Coach: Walt Schleuter (Dick Smith Swim); Peter Daland (Olympics)
Medal record
Representing United States
Olympic Games
| Silver medal – second place | 1964 Tokyo | 400 m freestyle |
Maccabiah Games
| Gold medal – first place | 1961 Israel | 4×100 m freestyle |
| Gold medal – first place | 1965 Israel | 400 m freestyle |
| Bronze medal – third place | 1961 Israel | 400 m freestyle |

Marilyn Ramenofsky (born August 20, 1946) is an American former competition swimmer, and a 1964 Olympic silver medalist in the 400-meter freestyle, who competed with Pomona College. She is a former world record-holder in the 400-meter freestyle, and coached swimming during her early career. Completing a PHd in Zoology in 1982 from the University of Washington, she had a career as a Professor and researcher at Vassar College, the University of Washington, and the University of California Davis.

== Personal ==
Ramenofsky was born one of four children on August 20, 1946, in Phoenix, Arizona, to Elizabeth Lantin Ramenofsky and Dr. Abraham Isadore Ramenofsky. Her father, Abraham, would act as team physician and travel with the American Swim team to the Maccabiah Games in Israel in September 1961. Marilyn's mother Elizabeth was born in Globe, Arizona, and married Abraham Ramenofsky on June 7, 1936, in Los Angeles.

Both of Marilyn's parents were graduates of the University of Illinois, where her mother Elizabeth graduated in 1930. Dr. Ramenofsky attended Medical School there, interned in Chicago, and began his practice in LaSalle in 1932 where he had been born. After Dr. Ramenofsky completed Air Force Service in WWII, the family moved to Phoenix, Arizona in the 1940s where Elizabeth had family and ancestry. Marilyn attended and graduated Phoenix's Central High School in the Spring of 1964.

== Swimming career ==
=== Early coach ===
Marilyn swam with Phoenix's well-known Dick Smith Swim Gym during her early swimming career under Hall of Fame swimming coach Walt Schlueter who also coached swimming at the University of Arizona, and for the Arizona Desert Rats. Schlueter was known as a stroke specialist who improved Ramenofsky's stroke technique and efficiency. Smith, an inductee of the Swimming Hall of Fame and primarily a diving coach, served as the Olympic Coach for the Women's Diving Team in 1964. Later Marilyn swam for the Arizona Desert Rats, an exceptional AAU Swim team that was coached by both Nancy and Walt Schlueter. Marilyn noted in interviews that "her rapid rise to the international spotlight was largely due to her training...with legendary swim coach Walter Schlueter", and that "suddenly my times were dropping and I was shooting to beat the people on top."

=== AAU All American ===
She was named to the Amateur Athletic Union (AAU) All-America women's swimming teams in 1962, 1963 and 1964. International Swimming Hall of Fame national director Buck Dawson wrote: "[Ramenofsky] was the first female to swim a perfect freestyle stroke."

=== 1964 Olympic trial 400 meter world record ===
Ramenofsky set new world-record times for the 400-meter freestyle three times in 1964, including once at the U.S. Olympic Trials, reducing the record to 4:39.5 on August 31 in New York. She had just turned 18. Though Marilyn had already broken the former world record, her best time at the Astoria Pool in the finals of the Olympic Trials in August 1964 sliced five seconds off the former World Record of 4:45.5 set in 1960. She also set a new U.S. record in the 220-yard freestyle in 1964, at 2:17.3. She trained with the U.S. Olympic swimming team in California in preparation for the Olympics with the U.S. Olypmic women's coach Peter Daland, focusing on repetitive timed sets to build endurance and speed.

== 1964 Olympic Silver medal ==
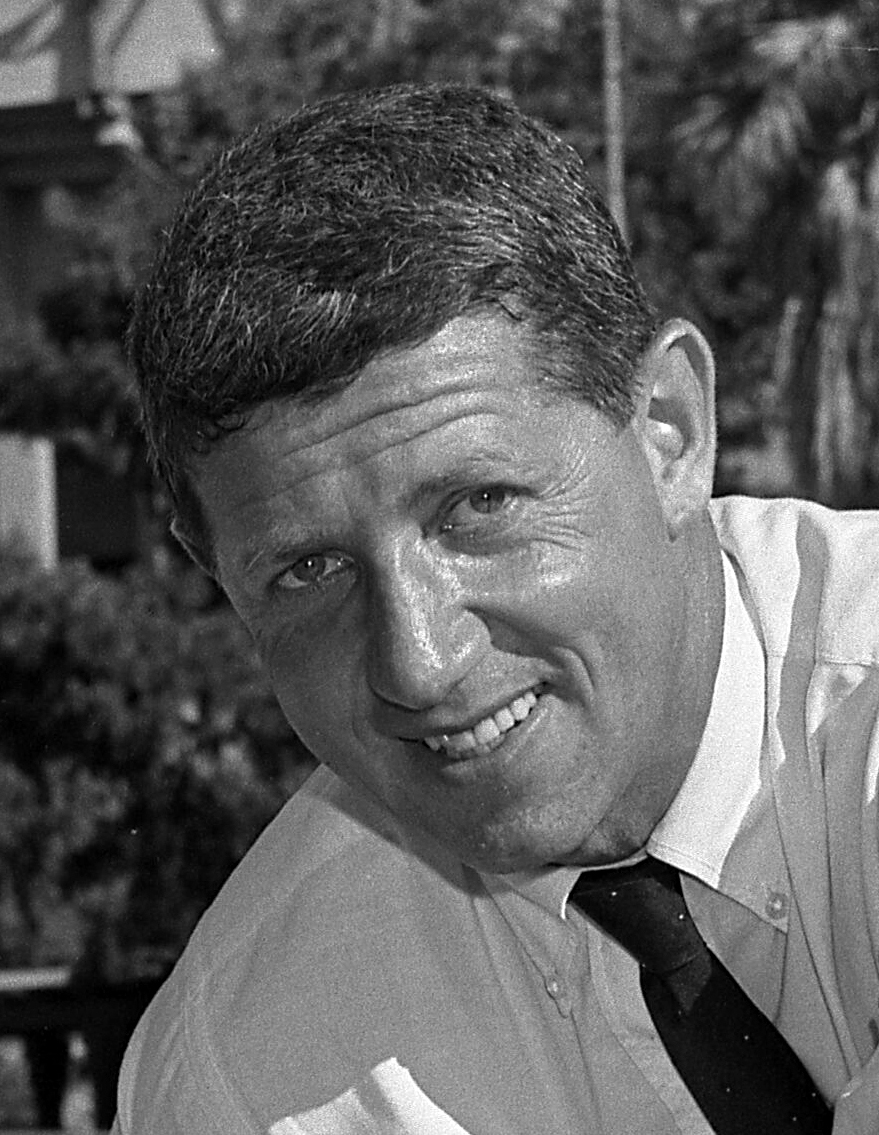
Coach P. Daland, '64

As noted, Ramenofsky represented the United States at the 1964 Summer Olympics in Tokyo, Japan under Olympic women's Head Coach Peter Daland. She received a silver medal for her second-place performance of 4:44.6 that October in the women's 400-meter freestyle. Marilyn's 4:44.6 broke the existing Olympic record of 4:47.7, but she was edged out, finishing only a second behind American teammate Ginny Duenkel who had a time of 4:43.3.

Marilyn had been the clear favorite to win the 400, as her Olympic Trial time would have taken the gold. Duenkel's winning Olympic time for the gold of 4:43:3, was nearly four seconds behind Marilyn's World Record time of 4:39.5, set two months earlier at the finals of the Olympic trials in New York on August 31.

=== Maccabiah Games ===
At the 1961 Maccabiah Games she won a gold medal in the 400-meter freestyle relay and a bronze in the 400-meter freestyle. At the 1965 Maccabiah Games, as one of nine American women entrants on the swimming and diving team, she won gold medals in both the 200-meter and 400-meter freestyles.

After attending Central High in Phoenix, and competing in the Tokyo Olympics, she attended Pomona College in Claremont, California, and trained with the Pomona College men's swim team because the college had no women's team. She focused on more than swimming at Pomona, and wrote a Bachelor's thesis on algae structures that became the start of a career in zoology and academia.

While swimming with the Arizona Desert Rats after her Olympic silver medal, Marilyn and three teammates set the national record for the 440-yard freestyle relay in August 1966, with a time of 4:18:07 at the Arizona Senior Invitational.

=== Coaching swimming ===
Marilyn was later involved in coaching for numerous teams at the high school and college level, even helping to lead the University of Texas to the state championships in 1971 while she was completing her master's degree in Austin.

== Life after swimming ==
Ramenofsky, who is Jewish, was inducted into the International Jewish Sports Hall of Fame in 1988.

=== Marriage ===
She married Dr. John Charteris Wingfield at South Mountain Park outside Phoenix, Arizona, in September 1979. At the time, the couple were both at the University of Washington, Seattle, studying in the field of endocrinology, the study of how hormones affect development, growth, and specialized metabolic functions. Wingfield was performing research subsequent to his Doctorate, and Ramenofsky was completing her Doctorate. Wingfield was a Zoologist and neurobiologist who had completed a Doctorate from the University College of North Wales in 1973. Like Marilyn, he would later perform research at the University of California, Davis, and collaborate with her on some of her research. Wingfield's research at UC Davis focused on neural pathways for environmental signals relating to seasonality, mechanisms of coping with environmental stress (allostasis), and the social modulation of hormone secretion. His work has had parallels with Marilyn's own research. The couple had a daughter in March, 1990.

=== Academic career ===
After enrolling in 1964, Ramenofsky received her bachelor's degree in 1969 in Botany and Biology from Pomona College, then completed her Masters of Science in 1972 in Zoology from the University of Texas at Austin. Her Doctorate in Zoology, completed in 1982, was received from the University of Washington. She began her academic career serving as a professor at Vassar College for three years, then taught for twenty years at the University of Washington until 2008, when she began teaching and research at the University of California, Davis. She has published numerous peer-reviewed articles on the physiology and behavior of migratory birds, most notably the white-crowned sparrow. Much of her research has focused on how glucocorticoids (steroid hormones) may orchestrate the suite of life history changes associated with bird migration.

Continuing at UC Davis since 2008, she has most recently studied the migration of birds, and changes in their muscle physiology during stages of migration. Her work has led to further studies of how climate change has affected the migration of birds. In 2011, she published "The Inconvenient Truths About Climate Change and Bird Migration". Her most recently published article is an analysis of the complex signaling to and from skeletal muscles within birds in migratory condition.

== See also ==
- List of Olympic medalists in swimming (women)
- List of select Jewish swimmers
- World record progression 400 metres freestyle
