= Vyacheslav Chernyshov =

Russian diver

Personal information
- Nationality: Russian
- Born: 16 September 1937 (age 88) Moscow, Russia

Sport
- Sport: Diving

Vyacheslav Chernyshov (born 16 September 1937) is a Russian diver. He competed in the men's 3 metre springboard event at the 1960 Summer Olympics.
