= Sigrid Müller =

Austrian swimmer

Personal information
- Born: 2 July 1943 (age 83) Bruck an der Mur, Austria

Sport
- Sport: Swimming

Sigrid Müller (born 2 July 1943) is an Austrian former swimmer. She competed in the women's 400 metre freestyle at the 1960 Summer Olympics.
