= József Csikány =

Hungarian swimmer (born 1943)

Personal information
- Born: 26 April 1943 (age 83) Budapest, Hungary
- Height: 1.88 m (6 ft 2 in)
- Weight: 76 kg (168 lb)

Sport
- Sport: Swimming
- Club: Ferencvárosi TC
Medal record
Representing Hungary
European Championships
Bronze medal – third place	1962 Leipzig	200 m backstroke
Bronze medal – third place	1966 Utrecht	4×100 m medley

József Csikány (born 26 April 1943) is a retired Hungarian backstroke swimmer who won two bronze medals at the European championships of 1962 and 1966. He competed in backstroke and medley relay events at the 1960 and 1964 Summer Olympics; his best achievement was sixth place in the 4 × 100 m medley relay in 1964.
