= Tazuko Ichikawa =

- Born: 1941 (age 84–85); Tokyo, Japan
- Website: http://www.tazukoichikawa.com/

Tazuko Ichikawa (born 1941, Tokyo, Japan) is an artist, primarily a sculptor, based in the Washington, D.C. area. Her studio is in Maryland. The forms of her sculptures are abstract, organic, and streamlined, and she employs natural materials. Curved, draping, bending, and flowing shapes repeat throughout her body of work.

== Biography and training ==
She was raised in Kamakura, Japan. She received her B.A. from Keio University in Tokyo. She moved to Washington, D.C. around 1971.

== Career and work ==
Ichikawa started sculpting around 1984. Her work incorporates Japanese principles and minimalist influences. Her media include wood, wax, metal, plastic, rope, and paint. Her color palette is generally subdued, with black, off-white, brown, gray, and navy tones. Her series include "the Plexi Series," "Vertical Series," "Wood & Wax Sculptures," and "Wood & Rope Sculptures." Her three-dimensional oeuvre includes outdoor sculptures, with titles such as Gather (2006) and Flow (2006), made of wood, rocks and stones, branches, and engaging bodies of water.

She creates works on paper as well. Her two-dimensional works utilize geometric shapes, lines, and the push-and-pull of perspectival space.

She was associated with the Washington Women's Art Center, and she has exhibited widely at commercial galleries and museums.

Collections

- Far and Close XVII (1985), oil pastel on paper, Smithsonian American Art Museum
- Reaching (1993-1994), wood and oil, University of Maryland Art Gallery
- Snow Draping (2014), wood and wax, University of Maryland Art Gallery

== Exhibitions ==
Solo Exhibitions

- Gallery 10, Ltd., Washington, DC (1983)
- Anton Gallery, Washington, DC (1984)
- Anton Gallery, Washington, DC (1986)
- Anton Gallery, Washington, DC (1998)
- Anton Gallery, Washington, DC (1990)
- The Annex, Washington, DC (1991)
- Anton Gallery, Washington, DC (1992)
- Anton Gallery, Washington, DC (1995)
- Sasakawa Peace Foundation Gallery, Washington, DC- Catalog (1995)
- Anton Gallery, Washington, DC (1996)
- Anton Gallery, Washington, DC (1998)
- Anton Gallery, Washington, DC (2000)
- Gallery K, Washington, DC (2002)
- "Light & Rhythm: Small Works by Tazuko Ichikawa" Luther W. Brady, Art Gallery George Washington University (2016)

Group Exhibitions

- Power House Gallery, Montreal, Canada (1981)
- Boston City Hall, MA (1982)
- Washington Project for the Arts, Washington, DC (1984)
- Strathmore Hall Arts Center, Rockville, MD (1984)
- Anton Gallery, Washington, DC (1984)
- Arlington Arts Center, Arlington, VA (1985)
- Gallery K, Washington, DC (1986)
- Andrea Ruggeri Gallery, Washington, DC (1987)
- Jane Haslem Gallery, Washington, DC (1987)
- Tart Gallery, Washington, DC (1989)
- Anton Gallery, Washington, DC (1989)
- Fondo Del Sol Visual Arts Center, Washington, DC (1990)
- University of Maryland, Baltimore, MD (1990)
- De Andino Fine Arts, Washington, DC (1990)
- McLean Project for the Arts, McLean, VA - Catalog (1992)
- St. John's University, Collegeville, MN (1992)
- Anton Gallery, Washington, DC (1992)
- Japan Information & Culture Center, Washington, DC - Catalog (1993)
- International Sculpture Center, Washington, DC (1993)
- Traveling Exhibition: (1993-1994)
  - University of Maryland, Baltimore, MD
  - Washington College, VA
  - Millersville University, PA
- Taylor/Hodges Gallery, Charlotte, NC (1994)
- McLean Project for the Arts, McLean, VA (1994)
- "In Wood and Material Variations" curated by Tex Andrews, Maryland Art Place, Baltimore, MD (1995)
- WPA/Corcoran Gallery of Art, Washington, DC (1996)
- Rockville Arts Place, Rockville, Maryland (1996)
- Anton Gallery, Washington, DC (1996)
