= Ginny Duenkel =

American swimmer (born 1947)

- Duenkel at 21 circa 1968

Personal information
- Full name: Virginia Ruth Duenkel -Fuldner
- Nickname: "Ginny"
- National team: United States
- Born: March 7, 1947 (age 79) Orange, New Jersey, U.S.
- Education: University of Michigan ('68 Education)
- Occupations: Teacher, swim coach
- Height: 5 ft 7 in (1.70 m)
- Weight: 134 lb (61 kg)
- Spouse: Chris Fuldner
- Children: 3

Sport
- Sport: Swimming
- Events: 100, 200 meter backstroke 400 freestyle
- Strokes: Backstroke, freestyle
- Club: Summit YMCA
- College team: University of Michigan; Non-varsity team (1965-66)
- Coach: Frank Elm (Summit Y); Peter Daland (Olympics)
Medal record
Women's swimming
Representing the United States
Olympic Games
Gold medal – first place	1964 Tokyo	400 m freestyle
Bronze medal – third place	1964 Tokyo	100 m backstroke
Pan American Games
Gold medal – first place	1963 São Paulo	4x100 m medley

Virginia Ruth Duenkel (née Duenkel; born March 7, 1947), known as Ginny Fuldner after her marriage, is an American former competition swimmer, who competed for the University of Michigan. She was a 1964 Tokyo Olympic champion in the 400 meter freestyle, and a former world record-holder in the 100-yard and 100-meter backstroke.

== Early life ==
Virginia Duenkel was born March 7, 1947 in Orange, New Jersey. From an athletic family, one of her two older brothers captained George Washington University's football team as a Senior. Duenkel began swimming at the St. Cloud Swim Club in West Orange around age nine with John Edack as her first coach, but began her career as one of the slower swimmers on the team. By eleven she swam for Coach Frank Elm with the strong program at the Summitt YMCA of Summitt, New Jersey where her practices became longer and more demanding. Lou Choquette was another important Summitt Y coaches. Nearby Summitt, New Jersey was just thirteen miles Southwest of her hometown of Orange. By 15, she became the American Athletic Union backstroke champion in the 200 meter event. She attended West Orange High School, though the school had no girls's sports at the time. She graduated West Orange in 1965, making the National Honor Society in her Junior Year. During her more intense high school training year as a Senior, she would practice in the morning at the Summitt YMCA, which was a short drive. In the evenings her mother would fight rush hour traffic to get her to the Rutgers Pool in New Brunswick to train with Coach Elm, who also coached the swim team at Rutgers University.

In March, 1963, Duenkel, swimming the backstroke leg, was part of the U.S. National team that won the gold medal in the 400-meter medley relay. In August, 1963, she won the 200 meter backstroke with a 2:30.3 and the 1,500 meter freestyle with at the National AAU Championship in High Point, North Carolina.

Duenkel set a new world record for the 100-yard backstroke of 1:02.3 on the evening of February 16, 1963 at the Philadelphia Open Age Group Championships. She broke the prior world record of 1:03 set in 1960.

== 1964 Tokyo Olympics ==
At the 1964 Summer Olympics in Tokyo, Japan, the first Olympics held in Asia, Duenkel medaled in two individual swimming events as a 17-year-old. She was coached by U.S. women's Head Olympic Coach Peter Daland and trained with the U.S. women's team in California prior to leaving for Tokyo.

In her first Olympic event, held on October 13-14, in stiff competition, six of the competitors had set former backstroke world records with both Duenkel and Kiki Karon having set recent world records in the 100 meter backstroke. Duenkel received a bronze medal in the women's 100-meter backstroke in a very close race with a time of 1:08.0, only 1/10 of a second behind the silver medal winner. American Cathy Ferguson took the gold with a time of 1:07.7, and Kiki Karon of France took the silver with a time of 1:07.9. At the 50-meter mark, the three medalists were nearly tied.

In her second Olympic event on October 17, in a very close finish on the last day of the swimming competition, she won the women's 400-meter freestyle, taking the gold medal in an Olympic record time of 4:43.3, though missing the former world record. Though she led through the first 175 meters of the race, pre-game favorite American rival Mariyn Romanofsky won the silver, finishing with a time of 4:44.6, only 1.3 seconds behind Duenkel. American teammate Terri Lee Stickles took the bronze with a time of 4:47.2, completing an American sweep of the medals. Celebrating her victory, the West Orange High School Band and cheerleading team met Duenkel at the Newark Airport on her arrival from Japan after her Olympic victory. She was honored with a parade and taken to City Hall by a motorcade where she was presented with a key to the city by the Mayor of West Orange, James Sheeran.

=== University of Michigan ===
Duenkel attended the University of Michigan, graduating around 1968 with a degree in Education. In both 1965 and 1966, the University of Michigan women's swim team won the National Championship for their fifth and sixth successive wins. She swam for the Michigan non-Varsity team only about a year. As the team practiced only two nights a week, Ginny was fully aware her training would not keep her in form to compete at a high level. Well before Title IX, swimming competitions were held under the auspices of the Division for Girls' and Women's Sports (DGWS), part of the American Association for Health, Physical Education, and Recreation (AAHPER). Duenkel swam for Michigan's Women's Athletic Association team, as there was no official women's varsity team until around 1973-4. The swimming program for Women at Michigan practiced in the Women's Swimming Pool at the Women's Athletic Building. The women's team was part of the Women's Athletic Association and the Department of Physical Education for women, but not the Athletic Department that administered the Men's swimming team. In May 1966 the pool was officially named the Margaret Bell Pool in honor of Dr. Margaret Bell, who administered Michigan's women's athletics. Swimming on her own, Duenkel won two national titles in 1965, including the 100-yard backstroke and the 200-yard freestyle. She won the 100-yard backstroke again in 1966.

=== Marriage, family, careers ===
In the summer of 1970, Duenkel moved to Fort Myers, Florida, where she taught first grade at Tanglewood Elementary School, while coaching the AAU team associated with the Fort Myers Swim Association.

In 1977, Duenkel met her husband Chris Fuldner, a former football athlete, in Denver. They married around 1977-78, and had two daughters and a son, having moved to Monnett, Missouri around 1977. In 1996 in Monnett, she coached swimming with the Monnett Walter Thrashers summer league which she helped start around 1989. She served primarily as a homemaker for a period, and returned to work as a teacher by 2000.

=== Honors ===
Duenkel was inducted into the International Swimming Hall of Fame as an "Honor Swimmer" in 1985. She received the Thomas Edison Lifetime Achievement Award from of the City of Orange, New Jersey in January, 2000, and was made a member of the University of Michigan Hall of Honor in 2007.

The "Ginny Duenkel Municipal Pool", in her hometown of West Orange, New Jersey was named in her honor, and opened around 1967. The "Chris and Ginny Fuldner Aquatic Center" in Monett, Missouri is named in honor of Ginny and her husband and her contributions to the sport of swimming.

== See also ==
- List of members of the International Swimming Hall of Fame
- List of Olympic medalists in swimming (women)
- List of University of Michigan sporting alumni
