= Michèle Pialat =

French swimmer

Personal information
- Nationality: French
- Born: 20 June 1942 Paris, France
- Died: 19 September 2021 (aged 79)

Sport
- Sport: Swimming
- Strokes: Breaststroke
Medal record
Representing France
Summer Universiade
Silver medal – second place	1963 Porto Alegre	200m breaststroke

Michèle Pialat (20 June 1942 – 19 September 2021) was a French breaststroke swimmer. She competed in two events at the 1960 Summer Olympics.
