= Imre Simkó =

Hungarian sport shooter (1939–2021)

Personal information
- Born: 6 January 1939 Békéscsaba, Hungary
- Died: 10 April 2021 (aged 82) Hungary

Sport
- Sport: Sports shooting

Imre Simkó (6 January 1939 – 10 April 2021) was a Hungarian sport shooter who competed in the 1960 Summer Olympics and in the 1964 Summer Olympics.
