= László Lantos =

Hungarian swimmer (1938–2019)

Personal information
- Born: 4 December 1938 Békéscsaba, Hungary
- Died: 9 June 2019 (aged 80)

Sport
- Sport: Swimming

László Lantos (4 December 1938 – 9 June 2019) was a Hungarian swimmer. He competed in three events at the 1960 Summer Olympics.
