= Magda Dávid =

Hungarian swimmer

Personal information
- Nationality: Hungarian
- Born: 23 February 1942 (age 84) Budapest, Hungary

Sport
- Sport: Swimming
Medal record
Women's swimming
Representing Hungary
Universiade
Silver medal – second place	1961 Sofia	100 m backstroke

Magda Dávid (born 23 February 1942) is a Hungarian former swimmer. She competed in two events at the 1960 Summer Olympics.
