= Jutta Wanke =

German swimmer

Personal information
- Born: 16 January 1948 (age 78) Potsdam, Germany
- Height: 162 cm (5 ft 4 in)
- Weight: 57 kg (126 lb)

Sport
- Sport: Swimming
- Strokes: Freestyle

Jutta Wanke (born 16 January 1948) is a German former swimmer. She competed in the women's 400 metre freestyle at the 1964 Summer Olympics. She was eliminated in the heats.
