= Roland Boullanger =

French swimmer (1939–2020)

Personal information
- Born: 11 January 1939 Paris, France
- Died: 28 July 2020 (aged 81)

Sport
- Sport: Swimming

Roland Boullanger (11 January 1939 – 28 July 2020) was a French breaststroke swimmer. He competed in two events at the 1960 Summer Olympics.
