= Georges Senecot =

French diver (1941–2026)

Personal information
- Full name: Georges Raymond Senecot
- Nationality: French
- Born: 14 June 1941 Paris, France
- Died: 3 July 2026 (aged 85) Roubaix, France

Sport
- Sport: Diving

Georges Senecot (14 June 1941 – 3 July 2026) was a French diver. He competed in the men's 3 metre springboard event at the 1960 Summer Olympics. He died on 3 July 2026, at the age of 85.
