= Pierre Guy =

French sports shooter (1931–2025)

Personal information
- Born: 5 August 1931 Pontarlier, France
- Died: 27 January 2025 (aged 93) Pontarlier, France

Sport
- Sport: Sports shooting

Pierre Guy (5 August 1931 – 27 January 2025) was a French sports shooter. He competed at the 1960 Summer Olympics and the 1964 Summer Olympics. Guy died on 27 January 2025, at the age of 93.
