= György Kunsági =

Hungarian swimmer (1934–2007)

Personal information
- Born: 12 March 1934 Budapest, Hungary
- Died: 4 July 1996 (aged 62)
- Height: 1.74 m (5 ft 9 in)
- Weight: 71 kg (157 lb)

Sport
- Sport: Swimming
- Club: Vasas, Budapest
Medal record
Representing Hungary
European Championships
Silver medal – second place	1958 Budapest	4×100 m medley

György Kunsági (12 March 1934 – 4 July 1996) was a Hungarian breaststroke swimmer who won a silver medal at the 1958 European Aquatics Championships. He competed in two events at the 1960 Summer Olympics, but did not reach the finals.
