= Tazuko Kikutani =

Japanese swimmer

Personal information
- Full name: 菊谷多鶴子 Kikutani Tazuko
- Born: 24 February 1947 (age 79)

Sport
- Sport: Swimming

Tazuko Kikutani (菊谷 多鶴子, Kikutani Tazuko; born 24 February 1947) is a Japanese former swimmer. She competed in the women's 400 metre freestyle at the 1964 Summer Olympics.
