= Donna Graham =

American swimmer (1942–1971)

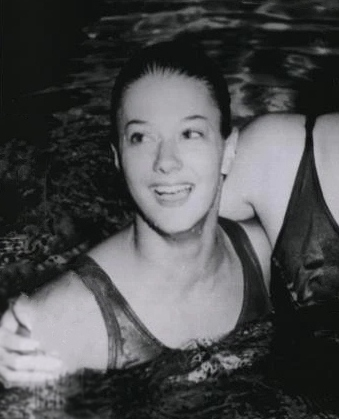

Personal information
- Full name: Donna Clarice Graham McCoy
- National team: United States
- Born: January 12, 1942 Indianapolis, Indiana, U.S.
- Died: March 14, 1971 (aged 29) Indianapolis, Indiana, U.S.

Sport
- Sport: Swimming
- Strokes: Freestyle
- Club: Riviera Club
- Coach: Johnny Galvich
Medal record
Representing the United States
Pan American Games
| Bronze medal – third place | 1959 Chicago | 400 m freestyle |

Donna Clarice Graham McCoy (January 12, 1942 – March 14, 1971) was an American competition swimmer. She won a bronze medal in the 400 m freestyle at the 1959 Pan American Games and was named an All-American swimmer in 1959, 1960 and 1961.

Graham was the daughter of Thornton F. Graham, chairman of the board at Graham Electronics Supply Inc., and Dorothy Simpson Graham. She lived in Indianapolis most of her life, together with brother Gordon and sister Doris. She graduated from the Broad Ripple High School and University of Arizona, and attended Butler University. After university graduation, Graham worked as a teacher at the Elvira School and John Strange School. She started training in swimming aged four, and competed nationally since age 14.

Graham committed suicide in 1971, aged 29. She and husband Steven L. McCoy had son Brian McCoy and daughter Erian McCoy.
