= Heidi Pechstein =

East German swimmer (born 1944)

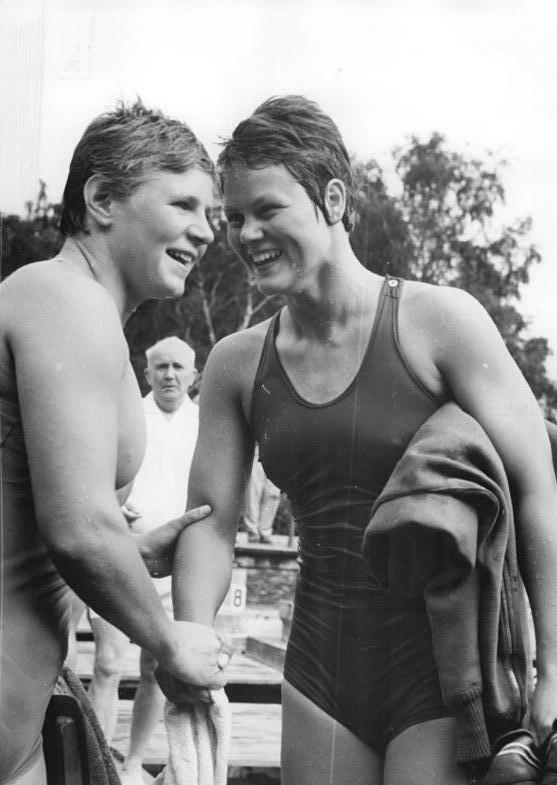
- Petra Noack (left) and Heidi Pechstein in 1962

Personal information
- Born: 4 July 1944 (age 81) Leipzig, Germany
- Height: 1.71 m (5 ft 7 in)
- Weight: 64 kg (141 lb)

Sport
- Sport: Swimming
- Club: SC DHfK, Leipzig
Medal record
Women's swimming
Representing East Germany
Swimming
Summer Olympics
Bronze medal – third place	1960 Rome	4 × 100 m freestyle relay
European Championships
Gold medal – first place	1962 Leipzig	4 × 100 m medley
Gold medal – first place	1962 Leipzig	100 m freestyle
Silver medal – second place	1966 Utrecht	400 m medley

Heidi Pechstein (later Kunze, born 4 July 1944 in Leipzig) is a German former swimmer. She competed in the 1960 and 1964 Summer Olympics and won a bronze medal in the 4 × 100 m freestyle relay in 1960. In 1964 she finished sixth with the German team in the same event.

At the 1962 European Aquatics Championships, she won a gold medal in the 4 × 100 m medley relay, setting the new world record. For this achievement, the relay team members were named German Sportspersonalities of the Year in the team category in 1962. Individually, Pechstein won a gold medal in the 100 m freestyle at the same championships and a silver medal in the 400 m medley four years later.
