= Colette Libourel =

French swimmer

Personal information
- Born: 26 December 1940 (age 85) Paris, France

Sport
- Sport: Swimming

Colette Libourel (born 26 December 1940) is a French former butterfly and freestyle swimmer. She competed in two events at the 1960 Summer Olympics.
