= József Dóra =

Hungarian diver

Personal information
- Nationality: Hungarian
- Born: 7 May 1941 (age 83); Budapest, Hungary

Sport
- Sport: Diving

József Dóra (born 7 May 1941) is a Hungarian diver. He competed at the 1960 Summer Olympics and the 1964 Summer Olympics.
