= János Konkoly =

Hungarian diver (1940–2018)

Personal information
- Nationality: Hungarian
- Born: 3 January 1940 Budapest, Hungary
- Died: 13 October 2018 (aged 78)

Sport
- Sport: Diving

János Konkoly (3 January 1940 – 13 October 2018) was a Hungarian diver. He competed in two events at the 1960 Summer Olympics.
