= Mária Frank =

Hungarian swimmer (1943–1992)

Personal information
- Born: 8 September 1943 Great Bečkerek, German-occupied Serbia
- Died: 20 November 1992 (aged 49) Eger, Hungary
- Height: 1.66 m (5 ft 5 in)
- Weight: 61 kg (134 lb)

Sport
- Sport: Swimming
- Club: Egri Dózsa; Orvostudományi Egyetem
Medal record
Representing Hungary
European Championships
Bronze medal – third place	1962 Leipzig	4×100 m freestyle

Mária Frank (8 September 1943 – 20 November 1992) was a Hungarian swimmer who won a bronze medal in the 4 × 100 m freestyle relay at the 1962 European Aquatics Championships. She finished fourth in the same event at the 1960 and 1964 Summer Olympics.

In 1964 she retired from swimming and later became a renowned pediatrician. After her untimely death in 1992, her husband, Dr. Renn Oscar, helped establish the annual Mária Frank Award for achievements in child healing.
