= Margaret Iwasaki =

Canadian swimmer (born 1942)

Personal information
- Full name: Margaret Harumi Iwasaki
- Born: 10 May 1942 (age 84) Vancouver, British Columbia, Canada
- Height: 159 cm (5 ft 3 in)
- Weight: 54 kg (119 lb)

Sport
- Sport: Swimming
- Events: 100 butterfly, 100 freestyle
- Strokes: Butterfly, freestyle
- Club: Vancouver Area Swim Club (VASC); Dolphin Swim Club (DSC)
- Coach: Howard Firby (DSC)
Medal record
Women's swimming
Representing Canada
British Empire and Commonwealth Games
| Silver medal – second place | 1958 Cardiff | 4×110 yd freestyle |
| Bronze medal – third place | 1958 Cardiff | 110 yd butterfly |
| Bronze medal – third place | 1958 Cardiff | 4×110 yd medley |
Pan American Games
| Silver medal – second place | 1959 Chicago | 4×100 m freestyle |
| Silver medal – second place | 1959 Chicago | 4×100 m medley |

Margaret Harumi Iwasaki (born 10 May 1942) is a Canadian former freestyle and butterfly swimmer who trained and competed with Vancouver's Canadian Dolphin Swim Club, and represented Canada in the 1960 Rome Olympics.

Iwasaki was born May 10, 1942 in greater Vancouver, British Columbia. She attended Vancouver's Point Grey Junior High School, and Winston Churchill Secondary School, where she graduated in June of 1960, receiving a Senior Award and a Churchill Club Award. Turning 12 in the summer of 1954, she began to swim with the Vancouver Province free swim classes. By fourteen, she trained with Hall of Fame Coach Howard Firby with the Vancouver Amateur Swim Club (VASC) and then with the Canadian Dolphin Swim Club. Firby founded Vancouver's Dolphin Swim Club in 1956 with Iwasaki's 1960 Canadian Olympic teammate, Mary Beth Stewart's father, William. A student of both anatomy and hydrodynamics, Firby specialized in teaching stroke technique, and taught the relatively new butterfly stroke to Iwasaki as one of his coaching specialties. Canadian Olympians Mary Stewart and her sister Helen, a 1956 Olympian, also swam with the club as one of seven initial members. Soon to be a dominant program, between 1956-1967, Firby's Canadian Dolphin team won six Canadian National team titles, with the exception of the year 1965. Swimming for the Dolphin Swim Club as a 14-year old, at the junior girls British Columbia Championships she broke the junior 200-yard junior freestyle record in February, 1957 with a time of 2:15.7, and also won the 200-yard backstroke.

== International competition ==
Competing at 16 as the youngest member of the team at the 1958 British Empire and Commonwealth Games in Cardiff, Wales, Iwasaki won a silver in the 4×110 freestyle relay, a bronze in the 110 yard butterfly, and a bronze in the 4×110 yard medley. She became one of Canada's highest point scorers in that years games, and according to her coach Howard Firby, trained as much as five hours a day in preparation. In the 1959 Pan American Games in Chicago, Margaret won silver medals in both the 4×100 meter freestyle relay, and the 4×100 meter medley relay.

At 18, Iwasaki set a Canadian Women's record in the 100-meter butterfly of 1:12.3, the sixth fastest time in the world. Her best time that year for the 100-meter freestyle was a 1:04.1.

== 1960 Rome Olympics ==
Iwasaki competed in three events at the 1960 Summer Olympics consisting of the 100-meter freestyle, the 100 meter butterfly, and the 4×100 meter medley relay. Swimming fourth in the third preliminary heat, Margaret placed 24th in the 100-meter freestyle with a time of 1:07.6. She tied for 11th overall in the 100 meter butterfly with a time of 1:14.2, placing third in the fourth preliminary heat. In the 4×100 meter medley relay, her Canadian team placed 8th overall with a combined time of 4:59.5, with Canadian team members Sara Barber, Vancouver Dolphin team mate Judith McHale, and Dolphin team mate Mary Beth Stewart.

== Honors ==
At 14, Iwasaki received the Beverly Bantam Champs Award for excellence in athletics. On January 8, 1959, she was named the 1958 Vancouver Chamber of Commerce Junior Athlete of the Year.
