= Katalin Boros =

Hungarian swimmer

Personal information
- Born: 8 January 1941 (age 85) Budapest, Hungary

Sport
- Sport: Swimming

Katalin Boros (born 8 January 1941) is a Hungarian former swimmer. She competed in two events at the 1960 Summer Olympics.
