= Anna Temesvári =

Hungarian swimmer

Personal information
- Nationality: Hungarian
- Born: 24 February 1943 (age 83) Újpest, Budapest, Hungary

Sport
- Sport: Swimming

Anna Temesvári (born 24 February 1943) is a Hungarian former backstroke and freestyle swimmer. She competed in two events at the 1960 Summer Olympics. Temesvári was born in the Újpest district of Budapest.
