= Marie-Laure Gaillot =

French swimmer

Personal information
- Nationality: French
- Born: 3 April 1943 (age 83) Paris, France

Sport
- Sport: Swimming

Marie-Laure Gaillot (born 3 April 1943) is a French former swimmer. She competed in two events at the 1960 Summer Olympics.
