= Annie Caron (swimmer) =

French swimmer

Personal information
- Born: 10 August 1941 (age 84) Paris, France

Sport
- Sport: Swimming

Annie Caron (born 10 August 1941) is a French former butterfly and freestyle swimmer. She competed in three events at the 1960 Summer Olympics.

She is the sister of Olympic swimmer Kiki Caron.
