= Chris von Saltza =

American swimmer (born 1944)

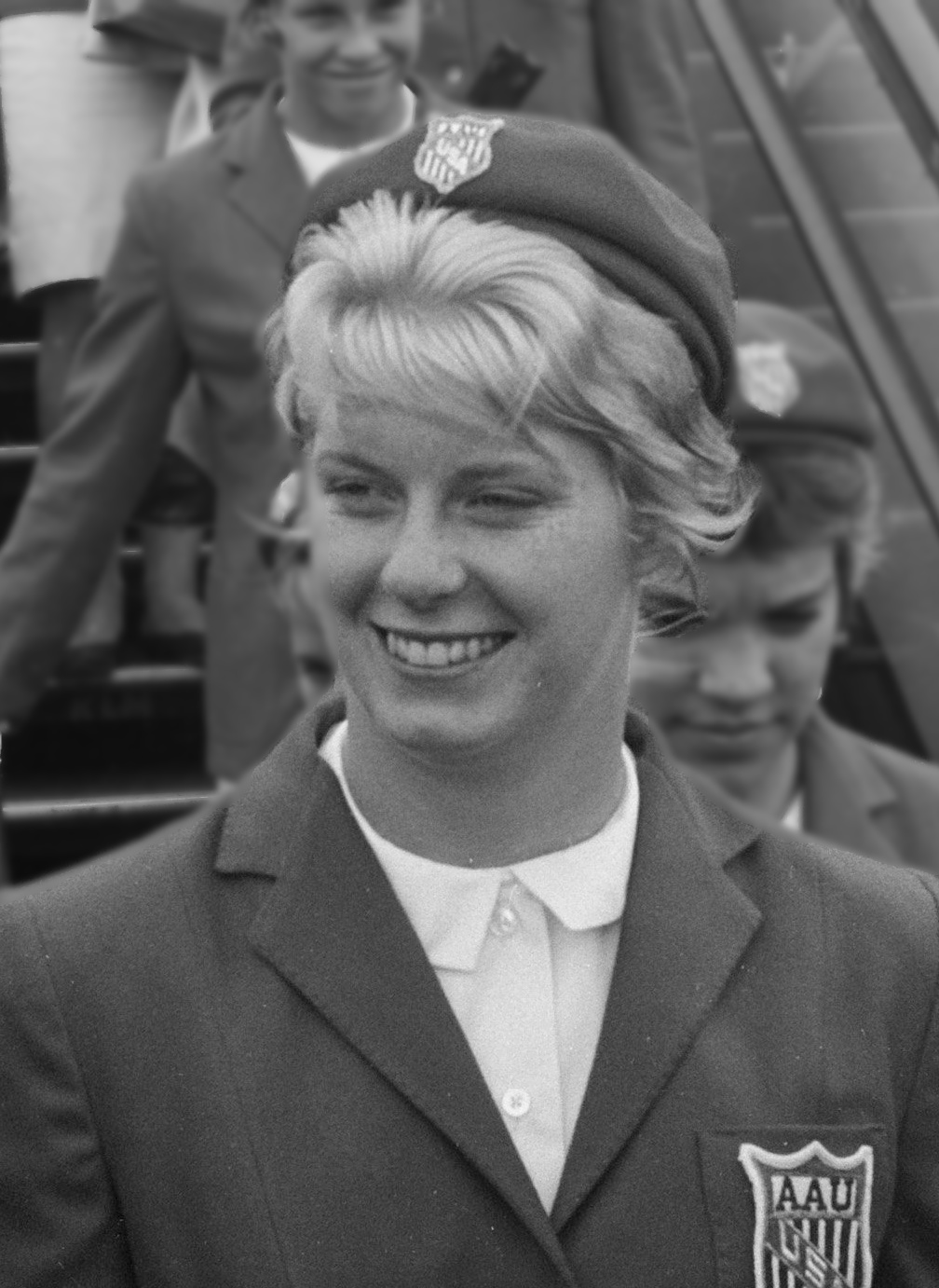
- von Saltza in 1961

Personal information
- Full name: Susan Christina von Saltza
- Nickname: "Chris"
- National team: United States
- Born: January 13, 1944 (age 82) San Francisco, California, U.S.
- Height: 5 ft 10 in (1.78 m)
- Weight: 139 lb (63 kg)

Sport
- Sport: Swimming
- Strokes: Freestyle
- Club: Santa Clara Swim Club
- Coach: George Haines
Medal record
Women's swimming
Representing the United States
Olympic Games
Gold medal – first place	1960 Rome	400 m freestyle
Gold medal – first place	1960 Rome	4×100 m freestyle
Gold medal – first place	1960 Rome	4×100 m medley
Silver medal – second place	1960 Rome	100 m freestyle
Pan American Games
Gold medal – first place	1959 Chicago	100 m freestyle
Gold medal – first place	1959 Chicago	200 m freestyle
Gold medal – first place	1959 Chicago	400 m freestyle
Gold medal – first place	1959 Chicago	4×100 m freestyle
Gold medal – first place	1959 Chicago	4×100 m medley

Susan Christina von Saltza (born January 13, 1944), also known by her married name Christina Olmstead, is an American former competition swimmer, Olympic champion, and former world record-holder in four events.

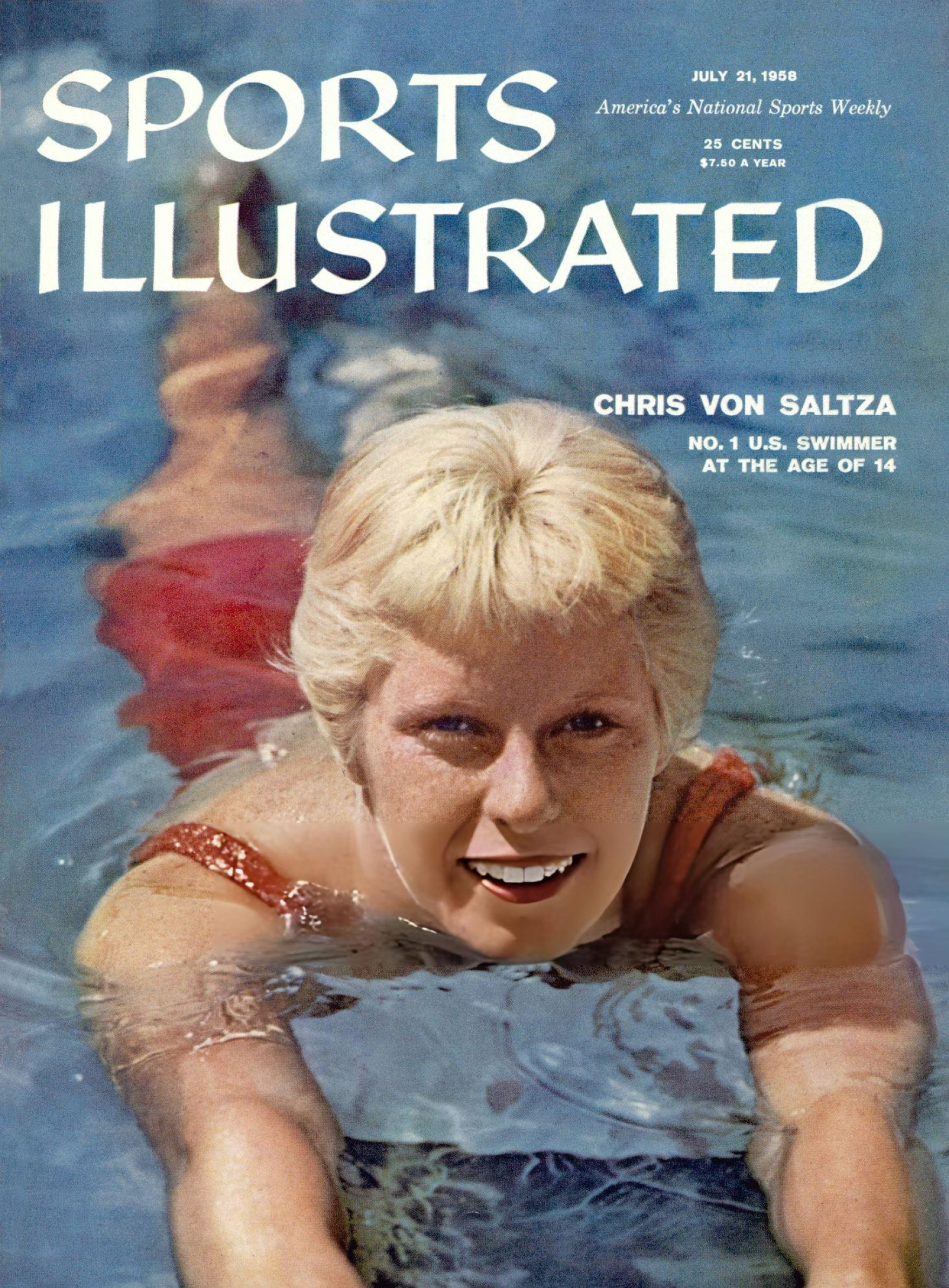
von Saltza on the cover of the July 21, 1958 issue of Sports Illustrated

As an age group swimmer, von Saltza swam for coach George Haines' Santa Clara Swim Club and led the club to multiple team championships at the nationals, in addition to winning nineteen individual Amateur Athletic Union (AAU) titles. She was featured on the July 21, 1958 cover of Sports Illustrated magazine as the "No. 1 U.S. Swimmer at the Age of 14."

At the age of 16, she set the world record in the 400-meter freestyle at the U.S. Olympic trials, and proceeded to win four medals at the 1960 Summer Olympics in Rome. Individually, she won a gold medal in the women's 400-meter freestyle, and a silver in the 100-meter freestyle. She won two more gold medals as a member of the winning U.S. teams in the women's 4×100-meter freestyle relay and 4×100-meter medley relay. Both U.S. relay teams set new world records in their respective events.

A year prior to the Olympics, von Saltza won five gold medals at the 1959 Pan American Games. Her wins came in the 100-, 200-, and 400-meter freestyle, as well as the 4×100-meter freestyle and 4×100-meter medley relays.

Von Saltza later attended Stanford University, and graduated with a bachelor's degree in Asian history. Stanford, like most major American universities, had no women's swimming and diving team prior to the enactment of Title IX, and von Saltza effectively retired from competition swimming after the 1960 Olympics.

In US, Christina was socially styled "the Baroness von Saltza," as her grandfather, Philip von Saltza, was member of the Saltza family of German origin, which is still part of the Swedish nobility. They immigrated to the United States at the turn of the 20th century, and she is still recognized by her title in the Who's Who of Swedish Nobility.

Von Saltza was inducted into the International Swimming Hall of Fame as an "Honor Swimmer" in 1966.

== See also ==
- List of members of the International Swimming Hall of Fame
- List of multiple Olympic gold medalists
- List of Olympic medalists in swimming (women)
- List of Stanford University people
- World record progression 200 metres backstroke
- World record progression 400 metres freestyle
- World record progression 4 × 100 metres freestyle relay
- World record progression 4 × 100 metres medley relay

Records
Preceded by Lenie de Nijs	Women's 200-meter backstroke world record-holder (long course); August 1, 1958 – July 12, 1959	Succeeded by Satoko Tanaka
Preceded by Ilsa Konrads	Women's 400-meter freestyle world record-holder (long course); August 5, 1960 – July 11, 1964	Succeeded by Marilyn Ramenofsky
