= Blanca Barrón =

Mexican swimmer (born 1934)

Personal information
- Born: 14 July 1934 (age 92) Mexico City, Mexico

Sport
- Sport: Swimming
Medal record
Representing Mexico
Pan American Games
Bronze medal – third place	1959 Chicago	4×100 m freestyle
Bronze medal – third place	1959 Chicago	4×100 m medley relay
Central American and Caribbean Games
Gold medal – first place	1959 Caracas	100 m freestyle
Gold medal – first place	1959 Caracas	400 m freestyle
Gold medal – first place	1959 Caracas	100 m backstroke
Gold medal – first place	1959 Caracas	4×100 m freestyle
Gold medal – first place	1962 Kingston	4×100 m freestyle

Blanca Barrón (born 14 July 1934) is a Mexican former swimmer. She competed at the 1956 Summer Olympics and the 1960 Summer Olympics.
