= Mexico at the 1960 Summer Olympics =

- IOC code: MEX
- NOC: Mexican Olympic Committee

in Rome
- Competitors: 69 (63 men and 6 women) in 14 sports
- Flag bearer: Pilar Roldán
- Medals Ranked 41st: Gold 0 Silver 0 Bronze 1 Total 1

Summer Olympics appearances (overview)
- 1900; 1904–1920; 1924; 1928; 1932; 1936; 1948; 1952; 1956; 1960; 1964; 1968; 1972; 1976; 1980; 1984; 1988; 1992; 1996; 2000; 2004; 2008; 2012; 2016; 2020; 2024; 2028

Mexico competed at the 1960 Summer Olympics in Rome, Italy. 69 competitors, 63 men and 6 women, took part in 54 events in 14 sports.

== Medalists ==
Medal	Name	Sport	Event	Date
Bronze	Juan Botella	Diving	3 m springboard	29 August

== Athletics ==
Men
Track & road events

Athlete	Event	Heat		Quarterfinal		Semifinal		Final	
Athlete	Event	Result	Rank	Result	Rank	Result	Rank	Result	Rank
Santiago Plaza	100 m	10.8	3 Q	10.8	7	did not advance			
Santiago Plaza	200 m	22.0	4	did not advance					
Jorge Terán	400 m	9:38.0	10	did not advance					
Alfredo Tinoco	3000 m steeplechase	49.6	6	—N/a				did not advance	
Rodolfo Mijares; Santiago Plaza; Roberto Procel; Jorge Terán	4 x 100 m relay	did not start		did not advance					

Field events

Athlete	Event	Qualification		Final	
Athlete	Event	Result	Rank	Result	Rank
Roberto Procel	Long jump	7.23	24	did not advance	

Combined events – Decathlon

Athlete	100 m	LJ	SP	HJ	400 m	110H	DT	PV	JT	1500 m	Points	Rank
Rodolfo Mijares	11.3	6.20	10.59	1.65	50.5	17.3	37.55	3.40	43.36	4:49.3	5413	21

Women
Track & road events

Athlete	Event	Heat		Quarterfinal		Semifinal		Final	
Athlete	Event	Result	Rank	Result	Rank	Result	Rank	Result	Rank
Sebastiana Alvarado	800 m	did not start		—N/a				did not advance	

== Cycling ==
Ten cyclists, all men, represented Mexico in 1960.

Individual road race

- Luis Zárate
- Jacinto Brito
- Mauricio Mata
- Filiberto Mercado

Team time trial

- Armando Martínez
- Filiberto Mercado
- Luis Zárate

Sprint

- Cenobio Ruiz
- Luis Muciño

1000m time trial

- Mauricio Mata

Tandem

- Luis Muciño
- José Luis Tellez

Team pursuit

- Mauricio Mata
- Javier Taboada
- Jacinto Brito
- Miguel Pérez

== Diving ==
Men

Athlete	Event	Preliminary		Semi-final				Final			
Athlete	Event	Points	Rank	Points	Rank	Total	Rank	Points	Rank	Total	Rank
Juan Botella	3 m springboard	60.66	3 Q	46.30	1	106.96	3 Q	55.34	4	162.30	3rd place, bronze medalist(s)
Álvaro Gaxiola	3 m springboard	54.89	6 Q	39.78	8	94.67	6 Q	55.75	3	150.42	4
Álvaro Gaxiola	10 m platform	49.30	20	Did not advance							
Roberto Madrigal	10 m platform	52.03	10 Q	43.85	4	95.88	6 Q	56.98	3	152.86	4

Women

Athlete	Event	Preliminary		Semi-final				Final			
Athlete	Event	Points	Rank	Points	Rank	Total	Rank	Points	Rank	Total	Rank
María Teresa Adames	3 m springboard	42.00	17	Did not advance							
María Teresa Adames	10 m platform	49.54	13	—N/a				Did not advance			

== Fencing ==
Eight fencers, seven men and one woman, represented Mexico in 1960.

Men's foil

- Raúl Cicero
- William Fajardo

Men's épée

- Antonio Almada
- Benito Ramos
- Ángel Roldán

Men's team épée

- Benito Ramos, Ángel Roldán, Antonio Almada, Sergio Escobedo, José Pérez

Men's sabre

- Benito Ramos
- William Fajardo

Women's foil

- Pilar Roldán

== Modern pentathlon ==
Three male pentathletes represented Mexico in 1960.

Individual

- Antonio Almada
- Sergio Escobedo
- José Pérez

Team

- Antonio Almada
- Sergio Escobedo
- José Pérez

== Rowing ==
Mexico had two male rowers participate in one out of seven rowing events in 1960.

Men's coxless pair

- Arcadio Padilla
- Roberto Retolaza

== Shooting ==
Six shooters represented Mexico in 1960.

25 m pistol

- Luis Jiménez
- Héctor Elizondo

50 m pistol

- Raúl Ibarra
- Ignacio Mendoza

50 m rifle, prone

- Paulino Díaz
- Ernesto Montemayor, Jr.

== Swimming ==
Men

Athlete	Event	Heat		Semifinal		Final	
Athlete	Event	Time	Rank	Time	Rank	Time	Rank
Jorge Escalante	100 m freestyle	57.6	=16 Q	59.0	24	Did not advance	
Raúl Guzmán	400 m freestyle	4:42.2	26	—N/a		Did not advance	
Mauricio Ocampo	400 m freestyle	4:35.3	13	—N/a		Did not advance	
Alfredo Guzmán	1500 m freestyle	19:11.1	21	—N/a		Did not advance	
Mauricio Ocampo	1500 m freestyle	18:29.0	13	—N/a		Did not advance	
Alejandro Gaxiola	100 m backstroke	1:05.9	=20	Did not advance			
Enrique Rabell	100 m backstroke	1:08.0	29	Did not advance			
Eulalio Ríos	200 m butterfly	2:22.7	9 Q	2:24.2	10	Did not advance	
Raúl Guzmán; Alfredo Guzmán; Jorge Escalante; Mauricio Ocampo	4 × 200 m freestyle	8:50.4	14	—N/a		Did not advance	
Alejandro Gaxiola; Enrique Rabell; Mauricio Ocampo; Jorge Escalante	4 × 100 m medley	4:23.1	12	—N/a		Did not advance	

Women

Athlete	Event	Heat		Semifinal		Final	
Athlete	Event	Time	Rank	Time	Rank	Time	Rank
Blanca Barrón	100 m freestyle	1:07.9	26	Did not advance			
María Luisa Souza	100 m freestyle	1:08.4	28	Did not advance			
Blanca Barrón	400 m freestyle	5:26.4	20	—N/a		Did not advance	
María Luisa Souza	400 m freestyle	5:21.3	17	—N/a		Did not advance	
Silvia Belmar	100 m butterfly	1:16.5	17	—N/a		Did not advance	
Eulalia Martínez	100 m butterfly	1:17.9	19	—N/a		Did not advance	
Eulalia Martínez; Silvia Belmar; Blanca Barrón; María Luisa Souza	4 × 100 m freestyle	4:43.1	11	—N/a		Did not advance	
