= Swimming at the 1960 Summer Olympics – Men's 100 metre backstroke =

Men's 100 metre backstroke at the Games of the XVII Olympiad
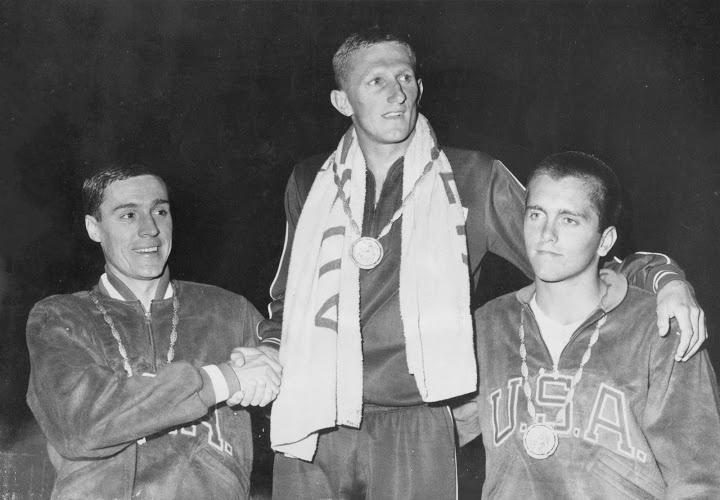
- Left-right: Frank McKinney, David Theile and Bob Bennett
- Venue: Stadio Olimpico del Nuoto
- Dates: 30 August 1960 (heats); 31 August 1960 (semifinals & final)
- Competitors: 37 from 27 nations
- Winning time: 1:01.9 OR

Medalists
1st place, gold medalist(s)		David Theile	Australia
2nd place, silver medalist(s)		Frank McKinney	United States
3rd place, bronze medalist(s)		Bob Bennett	United States

The men's 100 metre backstroke event at the 1960 Olympic Games took place between 30 and 31 August. This swimming event used backstroke. Because an Olympic-size swimming pool is 50 metres long, this race consisted of two lengths of the pool.

== Results ==
=== Heats ===
Five heats were held; the fastest sixteen swimmers advanced to the Semifinals. The swimmers that advanced to the Semifinals are highlighted.

==== Heat One ====
Rank	Athlete	Country	Time
1	John Monckton	Australia	1:04.4
2	József Csikány	Hungary	1:04.5
3	Wolfgang Wagner	Germany	1:04.7
4	Kazuo Tomita	Japan	1:04.7
5	Herman Verbauwen	Belgium	1:05.0
6	Julio Cabrera	Spain	1:06.5
7	Raúl Cerqueira	Portugal	1:06.7
8	Dimitrios Kolovos	Greece	1:13.8

==== Heat Two ====
Rank	Athlete	Country	Time
1	Bob Bennett	United States	1:02.0
2	Leonid Barbier	Soviet Union	1:03.5
3	Jürgen Dietze	Germany	1:04.0
4	Jan Jiskoot	Netherlands	1:05.9
5	Friedrich Suda	Austria	1:06.0
6	Mihovil Dorčić	Yugoslavia	1:06.0
7	Joram Shnider	Israel	1:11.1
8	Ünsal Fikirci	Turkey	1:15.2

==== Heat Three ====
Rank	Athlete	Country	Time
1	Robert Christophe	France	1:04.0
2	Graham Sykes	Great Britain	1:04.8
3	Bob Wheaton	Canada	1:05.7
4	Bengt-Olov Almstedt	Sweden	1:05.9
5	Alejandro Gaxiola	Mexico	1:05.9
6	Athos de Oliveira	Brazil	1:07.9
7	Rudy Muller	Luxembourg	1:12.3

==== Heat Four ====
Rank	Athlete	Country	Time
1	David Theile	Australia	1:03.1
2	Veiko Siimar	Soviet Union	1:04.6
3	Giuseppe Avellone	Italy	1:05.4
4	Haydn Rigby	Great Britain	1:06.2
5	Kazuo Watanabe	Japan	1:08.4
6	Lorenzo Cortez	Philippines	1:08.7
7	Rolf Burggraf	Switzerland	1:11.0

==== Heat Five ====
Rank	Athlete	Country	Time
1	Frank McKinney	United States	1:02.4
2	Pedro Diz	Argentina	1:04.7
3	Stig-Olof Grenner	Finland	1:04.7
4	Claude Raffy	France	1:05.8
5	Gilberto Elsa	Italy	1:05.8
6	Enrique Rabell	Mexico	1:08.0
7	János Konrád	Hungary	1:19.9

=== Semifinals ===
Two heats were held; the fastest eight swimmers advanced to the Finals. Those that advanced are highlighted.

==== Semifinal One ====
Rank	Athlete	Country	Time
1	David Theile	Australia	1:03.1
2	Robert Christophe	France	1:03.7
3	Bob Bennett	United States	1:03.7
4	John Monckton	Australia	1:03.8
5	Veiko Siimar	Soviet Union	1:04.6
6	Kazuo Tomita	Japan	1:05.2
7	Stig-Olof Grenner	Finland	1:05.2
8	Herman Verbauwen	Belgium	1:06.2

==== Semifinal Two ====
Rank	Athlete	Country	Time
1	Frank McKinney	United States	1:03.8
2	Wolfgang Wagner	Germany	1:03.9
3	Leonid Barbier	Soviet Union	1:04.3
4	Jürgen Dietze	Germany	1:04.7
5	Graham Sykes	Great Britain	1:04.7
6	Pedro Diz	Argentina	1:05.0
7	József Csikány	Hungary	1:05.2
8	Giuseppe Avellone	Italy	1:06.5

=== Final ===
Rank	Athlete	Country	Time	Notes
1	David Theile	Australia	1:01.9	OR
2	Frank McKinney	United States	1:02.1	
3	Bob Bennett	United States	1:02.3	
4	Robert Christophe	France	1:03.2	
5	Leonid Barbier	Soviet Union	1:03.5	
6	Wolfgang Wagner	United Team of Germany	1:03.5	
7	John Monckton	Australia	1:04.1	
8	Veiko Siimar	Soviet Union	1:04.6	

Key: OR = Olympic record
