= Swimming at the 1959 Pan American Games – Men's 400 metre freestyle =

Men's 400 metre freestyle at the I959 Pan American Games
- Venue: -
- Dates: September 1 (preliminaries), September 3 (finals)

Medalists
Gold medal	George Breen	United States
Silver medal	George Harrison	United States
Bronze medal	Eugene Lenz	United States

The men's 400 metre freestyle competition of the swimming events at the 1959 Pan American Games took place on 1 September (preliminaires) and 3 September (finals). The last Pan American Games champion was James McLane of US.

This race consisted of eight lengths of the pool, with all eight being in the freestyle stroke.

== Results ==
All times are in minutes and seconds.

KEY:	q	Fastest non-qualifiers	Q	Qualified	GR	Games record	NR	National record	PB	Personal best	SB	Seasonal best

=== Heats ===
The first round was held on September 1.

Rank	Heat	Name	Nationality	Time	Notes
1	1	George Harrison	United States	4:34.1	Q, GR
-	2	Eugene Lenz	United States	4:37.2	Q
-	1	Alfredo Guzmán	Mexico	-	Q
-	2	Mauricio Ocampo	Mexico	-	Q
-	4	Sídnei Gavioli	Brazil	4:44.9	Q
-	3	George Breen	United States	4:46.4	Q
-	4	Jorge Escalante	Mexico	-	Q
-	-	-	-	-	Q
-	-	Francisco Carioba	Brazil	-	

=== Final ===
The final was held on September 3.

Rank	Name	Nationality	Time	Notes
1st place, gold medalist(s)	George Breen	United States	4:31.4	GR
2nd place, silver medalist(s)	George Harrison	United States	4:31.8	
3rd place, bronze medalist(s)	Eugene Lenz	United States	4:34.9	
4	Mauricio Ocampo	Mexico	4:42.4	
5	Alfredo Guzmán	Mexico	4:42.7	
6	Jorge Escalante	Mexico	4:49.9	
7	-	-	-	
8	Sídnei Gavioli	Brazil	4:50.2	
