= Swimming at the 1959 Pan American Games – Men's 1500 metre freestyle =

Men's 1500 metre freestyle at the I959 Pan American Games
- Venue: -
- Dates: August 31 (preliminaries), September 4 (finals)

Medalists
| Gold medal | Alan Somers | United States |
| Silver medal | George Breen | United States |
| Bronze medal | Gary Heinrich | United States |

The men's 1500 metre freestyle competition of the swimming events at the 1959 Pan American Games took place on 31 August (preliminaries) and 4 September (finals). The last Pan American Games champion was James McLane of US.

This race consisted of thirty lengths of the pool, all lengths being in freestyle.

== Results ==
All times are in minutes and seconds.

| KEY: | q | Fastest non-qualifiers | Q | Qualified | GR | Games record | NR | National record | PB | Personal best | SB | Seasonal best |

=== Heats ===
The first round was held on August 31.

| Rank | Heat | Name | Nationality | Time | Notes |
|---|---|---|---|---|---|
| 1 | 1 | Alan Somers | United States | 18:15.9 | Q, GR |
| 2 | 3 | George Breen | United States | 18:30.1 | Q |
| 3 | 2 | Gary Heinrich | United States | 18:38.2 | Q |
| 4 | 1 | Alfredo Guzmán | Mexico | 18:50.4 | Q |
| 5 | 2 | Mauricio Ocampo | Mexico | 18:52.7 | Q |
| 6 | 3 | Raúl Guzmán | Mexico | 19:21.9 | Q |
| 7 | 1 | Alberto Udquiaga | Peru | 19:57.5 | Q |
| 8 | 1 | Carlos Fiorito | Argentina | 20:11.8 | Q |
| - | 3 | Aldo Perseke | Brazil | 20:20.0 | |

=== Final ===
The final was held on September 4.

| Rank | Name | Nationality | Time | Notes |
|---|---|---|---|---|
| 1st place, gold medalist(s) | Alan Somers | United States | 17:53.2 | GR |
| 2nd place, silver medalist(s) | George Breen | United States | 17:55.0 | |
| 3rd place, bronze medalist(s) | Gary Heinrich | United States | 18:30.6 | |
| 4 | Alfredo Guzmán | Mexico | 18:38.4 | |
| 5 | Mauricio Ocampo | Mexico | 18:58.7 | |
| 6 | Raúl Guzmán | Mexico | 18:59.0 | |
| 7 | - | - | - | |
| 8 | - | - | - | |
