= Swimming at the 1963 Pan American Games – Men's 4 × 200 metre freestyle relay =

Men's 4 × 200 metre freestyle relay at the 1963 Pan American Games
- Venue: -

Medalists
| Gold medal | Gary Ilman, Richard McDonough, David Lyons and Ed Townsend | United States |
| Silver medal | Ralph Hutton, Aldwin Meinhardt, Ed Casalet and Sandy Gilchrist | Canada |
| Bronze medal | Athos de Oliveira, Antônio Renzo Filho, Antônio Celso Guimarães and Peter Wolfgang Metzner | Brazil |

The men's 4 × 200 metre freestyle relay competition of the swimming events at the 1963 Pan American Games took place on April. The defending Pan American Games champion is the United States.

== Results ==
All times are in minutes and seconds.

| KEY: | q | Fastest non-qualifiers | Q | Qualified | GR | Games record | NR | National record | PB | Personal best | SB | Seasonal best |

=== Final ===
The final was held on April.

| Rank | Name | Nationality | Time | Notes |
|---|---|---|---|---|
| 1st place, gold medalist(s) | Gary Ilman; Richard McDonough; David Lyons; Ed Townsend | United States | 8:16.9 | |
| 2nd place, silver medalist(s) | Ralph Hutton; Aldwin Meinhardt; Ed Casalet; Sandy Gilchrist | Canada | 8:33.0 | |
| 3rd place, bronze medalist(s) | Athos de Oliveira; Antônio Renzo Filho; Antônio Celso Guimarães; Peter Wolfgang Metzner | Brazil | 8:41.4 | |
| 4 | D. Jimenez; A. Feo; V. Capriles; Teodoro Capriles | Venezuela | 8:49.9 | |
| 5 | Alberto Pérez; Carlos van der Maath; H.di Luca; Luis Nicolao | Argentina | 8:50.0 | |
| 6 | R. Herrera; Rafael Hernández; Alfredo Guzmán; Mauricio Ocampo | Mexico | 8:51.9 | |
| 7 | - - - - | - | - | |
| 8 | - - - - | - | - | |
