= Thailand at the 1960 Summer Olympics =

- IOC code: THA
- NOC: National Olympic Committee of Thailand

in Rome
- Competitors: 20 in 4 sports
- Medals: Gold 0 Silver 0 Bronze 0 Total 0

Summer Olympics appearances (overview)
- 1952; 1956; 1960; 1964; 1968; 1972; 1976; 1980; 1984; 1988; 1992; 1996; 2000; 2004; 2008; 2012; 2016; 2020; 2024

Thailand competed at the 1960 Summer Olympics in Rome, Italy. Twenty competitors, all men, took part in sixteen events in four sports.

== Athletics ==
Men's 1500 metres

- Dhira Phiphobmongkol (eliminated in heat 1)

== Shooting ==
Six shooters represented Thailand in 1960.

25 m pistol

- Prateep Polphantin
- Sumol Sumontame

50 m pistol

- Chalermsakdi Inswang
- Amorn Yuktanandana

50 m rifle, three positions

- Krisada Arunwong
- Saroj Silpikul

50 m rifle, prone

- Saroj Silpikul
- Krisada Arunwong
