= Swimming at the 1963 Pan American Games – Men's 100 metre backstroke =

Men's 100 metre backstroke at the 1963 Pan American Games
- Venue: -

Medalists
| Gold medal | Ed Bartsch | United States |
| Silver medal | Charles Bittick | United States |
| Bronze medal | Athos de Oliveira | Brazil |

The men's 100 metre backstroke competition of the swimming events at the 1963 Pan American Games took place on April. The last Pan American Games champion was Frank McKinney of US.

This race consisted of two lengths of the pool, all in backstroke.

== Results ==
All times are in minutes and seconds.

| KEY: | q | Fastest non-qualifiers | Q | Qualified | GR | Games record | NR | National record | PB | Personal best | SB | Seasonal best |

=== Final ===
The final was held on April.

| Rank | Name | Nationality | Time | Notes |
|---|---|---|---|---|
| 1st place, gold medalist(s) | Ed Bartsch | United States | 1:01.5 | |
| 2nd place, silver medalist(s) | Charles Bittick | United States | 1:02.1 | |
| 3rd place, bronze medalist(s) | Athos de Oliveira | Brazil | 1:03.2 | |
| 4 | Carlos van der Maath | Argentina | 1:06.0 | |
| 5 | Luis Figueiredo | Brazil | 1:07.6 | |
| 6 | Ralph Hutton | Canada | 1:07.8 | |
| 7 | - | - | - | |
| 8 | - | - | - | |
