= Swimming at the 1960 Summer Olympics – Men's 1500 metre freestyle =

Men's 1500 metre freestyle at the Games of the XVII Olympiad
- Venue: Stadio Olimpico del Nuoto
- Dates: 2–3 September 1960 (heats & final)
- Competitors: 30 from 19 nations
- Winning time: 17:19.6 OR

Medalists
1st place, gold medalist(s)		John Konrads	Australia
2nd place, silver medalist(s)		Murray Rose	Australia
3rd place, bronze medalist(s)		George Breen	United States

The men's 1500 metre freestyle event at the 1960 Olympic Games took place between 2 and 3 September. This swimming event used freestyle swimming, which means that the method of the stroke is not regulated (unlike backstroke, breaststroke, and butterfly events). Nearly all swimmers use the front crawl or a variant of that stroke. Because an Olympic size swimming pool is 50 metres long, this race consisted of 30 lengths of the pool.

== Results ==
=== Heats ===
Five heats were held; the eight fastest swimmers advanced to the Finals. Those that advanced are highlighted. The heats were held 2 September.

==== Heat One ====
Rank	Athlete	Country	Time
1	Tsuyoshi Yamanaka	Japan	17:46.5
2	Aubrey Bürer	South Africa	18:17.8
3	Gerhard Hetz	Germany	18:32.2
4	Ilkka Suvanto	Finland	18:41.1
5	Alfredo Guzmán	Mexico	19:11.1
6	Paolo Galletti	Italy	20:28.2
7	Rainer Goltzsche	Switzerland	20:45.1

==== Heat Two ====
Rank	Athlete	Country	Time
1	Alan Somers	United States	17:54.1
2	Murray McLachlan	South Africa	18:09.9
3	Masami Nakabo	Japan	18:30.4
4	Bob Sreenan	Great Britain	18:57.1
5	Tin Maung Ni	Burma	19:09.8
6	Slobodan Kićović	Yugoslavia	20:29.0
	Alberto Feo Corao	Venezuela	DNS

==== Heat Three ====
Rank	Athlete	Country	Time
1	George Breen	United States	17:55.9
2	Lars-Erik Bengtsson	Sweden	18:19.7
3	Veljko Rogošić	Yugoslavia	18:51.8
4	Miguel Torres	Spain	19:21.8
5	Massimo Rosi	Italy	19:52.9
6	András Bodnár	Hungary	20:22.2
	Robert Chenaux	Puerto Rico	DNS

==== Heat Four ====
Rank	Athlete	Country	Time
1	John Konrads	Australia	17:52.0
2	József Katona	Hungary	17:53.5
3	Richard Campion	Great Britain	17:54.8
4	Hans-Ulrich Millow	Germany	18:22.7
5	Mauricio Ocampo	Mexico	18:29.0
6	Zakaria Nasution	Indonesia	19:18.6
	Amiram Trauber	Israel	DNS

==== Heat Five ====
Rank	Athlete	Country	Time
1	Murray Rose	Australia	17:32.8
2	Bana Sailani	Philippines	18:18.8
3	Gennady Androsov	Soviet Union	18:39.0
4	Hans-Ulrich Dürst	Switzerland	19:21.9
5	Eduardo de Sousa	Portugal	19:40.1
	Bengt-Olov Almstedt	Sweden	DNS

=== Final ===
The Men's 1500 m Freestyle Final was held 3 September.

Rank	Athlete	Country	Time	Notes
1	John Konrads	Australia	17:19.6	OR
2	Murray Rose	Australia	17:21.7	
3	George Breen	United States	17:30.6	
4	Tsuyoshi Yamanaka	Japan	17:34.7	
5	József Katona	Hungary	17:43.7	
6	Murray McLachlan	South Africa	17:44.9	
7	Alan Somers	United States	18:02.8	
8	Richard Campion	Great Britain	18:22.7	

Key: OR = Olympic record
