= Swimming at the 1959 Pan American Games – Men's 100 metre backstroke =

Men's 100 metre backstroke at the I959 Pan American Games
- Venue: -
- Dates: September 1 (preliminaries), September 3 (finals)

Medalists
Gold medal	Frank McKinney	United States
Silver medal	Charles Bittick	United States
Bronze medal	Louis Schaeffer	United States

The men's 100 metre backstroke competition of the swimming events at the 1959 Pan American Games took place on 1 September (preliminaires) and 3 September (finals). The last Pan American Games champion was Frank McKinney of US.

This race consisted of two lengths of the pool, all in backstroke.

== Results ==
All times are in minutes and seconds.

KEY:	q	Fastest non-qualifiers	Q	Qualified	GR	Games record	NR	National record	PB	Personal best	SB	Seasonal best

=== Heats ===
The first round was held on September 1.

Rank	Heat	Name	Nationality	Time	Notes
1	3	Frank McKinney	United States	1:03.2	Q, GR
2	1	Louis Schaeffer	United States	1:03.2	Q
3	2	Charles Bittick	United States	1:03.7	Q
4	1	Robert Wheaton	Canada	1:05.3	Q
5	1	Enrique Rabell	Mexico	1:07.2	Q
6	2	Athos de Oliveira	Brazil	1:07.8	Q
7	3	Álvaro Gaxiola	Mexico	1:07.9	Q
8	2	Pedro Diaz	Argentina	1:09.0	Q
-	3	João de Almeida	Brazil	1:09.7	

=== Final ===
The final was held on September 3.

Rank	Name	Nationality	Time	Notes
1st place, gold medalist(s)	Frank McKinney	United States	1:03.6	
2nd place, silver medalist(s)	Charles Bittick	United States	1:04.2	
3rd place, bronze medalist(s)	Louis Schaeffer	United States	1:05.3	
4	Robert Wheaton	Canada	1:05.5	
5	Álvaro Gaxiola	Mexico	1:07.5	
6	Enrique Rabell	Mexico	1:07.9	
7	Athos de Oliveira	Brazil	1:08.4	
8	Pedro Diaz	Argentina	-	
