= Varetto =

Varetto is an Italian surname. Notable people with the surname include:

- Angelo Varetto (1910–2001), Italian cyclist
- Carlo Varetto (1905–1966), Italian Olympic shooter
- Sergio Varetto (1937–1981), Italian Olympic shooter, son of Carlo
