= Luis Zárate =

Luis Zárate is a name. People with that name include:

- Luis Zárate (cyclist) (1940–2020), Mexican cyclist
- Luis Zárate (footballer) (born 2000), Paraguayan footballer
