= Aldo Perseke =

Brazilian swimmer (born 1943)

Personal information
- Full name: Aldo Perseke
- Nationality: Brazil
- Born: February 24, 1943 (age 83) Rio de Janeiro, Rio de Janeiro, Brazil
- Height: 1.75 m (5 ft 9 in)

Sport
- Sport: Swimming
- Strokes: Butterfly
Medal record
Men's swimming
Representing Brazil

Aldo Perseke (born February 24, 1943) is a former Olympic butterfly swimmer from Brazil, who participated at one Summer Olympics for his native country.

At the 1959 Pan American Games in Chicago, he finished 4th in the 4 × 200-metre freestyle. He also swam the 1500 metre freestyle, not reaching the final.

At the 1960 Summer Olympics in Rome, he swam the 200-metre butterfly and the 4×100-metre medley, not reaching the finals.
