= Swimming at the 1960 Summer Olympics – Men's 400 metre freestyle =

Men's 400 metre freestyle at the Games of the XVII Olympiad
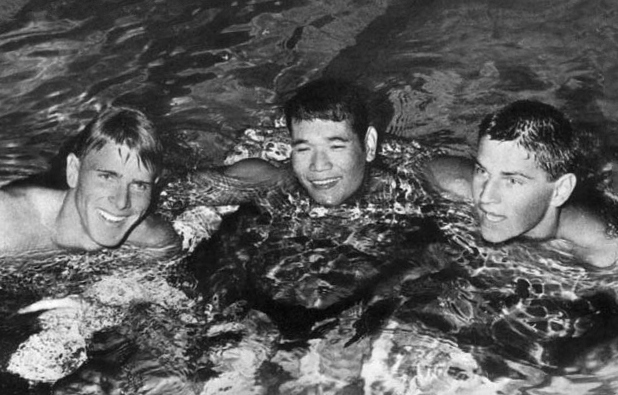
- Left-right: Murray Rose, Tsuyoshi Yamanaka and John Konrads after the final race.
- Venue: Stadio Olimpico del Nuoto
- Dates: 30 August 1960 (heats); 31 August 1960 (final)
- Competitors: 40 from 25 nations
- Winning time: 4:18.3 OR

Medalists
1st place, gold medalist(s)		Murray Rose	Australia
2nd place, silver medalist(s)		Tsuyoshi Yamanaka	Japan
3rd place, bronze medalist(s)		John Konrads	Australia

The men's 400 metre freestyle event at the 1960 Olympic Games took place between 30 and 31 August. This swimming event used freestyle swimming, which means that the method of the stroke is not regulated (unlike backstroke, breaststroke, and butterfly events). Nearly all swimmers use the front crawl or a variant of that stroke. Because an Olympic-size swimming pool is 50 metres long, this race consisted of eight lengths of the pool.

== Results ==
=== Heats ===
Six heats were held; the fastest eight swimmers advanced to the Finals. The swimmers that advanced are highlighted.

==== Heat One ====
Rank	Athlete	Country	Time
1	Tsuyoshi Yamanaka	Japan	4:21.0
2	Hans-Joachim Klein	Germany	4:31.6
3	Veljko Rogošić	Yugoslavia	4:39.5
4	Tamás Hornyánszky	Hungary	4:46.2
5	Helmut Ilk	Austria	4:58.1
6	Karl Fridlin	Switzerland	5:02.3

==== Heat Two ====
Rank	Athlete	Country	Time
1	John Konrads	Australia	4:24.3
2	József Katona	Hungary	4:29.5
3	Richard Campion	Great Britain	4:32.3
4	Sven-Göran Johansson	Sweden	4:35.6
5	Kari Haavisto	Finland	4:36.0
6	Jean Pommat	France	4:46.5
–	Leonid Kolesnikov	Soviet Union	DNF

==== Heat Three ====
Rank	Athlete	Country	Time
1	Ian Black	Great Britain	4:21.9
2	Makoto Fukui	Japan	4:26.7
3	Jerzy Tracz	Poland	4:38.6
4	Per-Olof Ericsson	Sweden	4:41.2
5	Ilkka Suvanto	Finland	4:42.1
6	Raúl Guzmán	Mexico	4:42.2
7	Eduardo de Sousa	Portugal	4:51.6

==== Heat Four ====
Rank	Athlete	Country	Time
1	Murray Rose	Australia	4:22.5
2	Aubrey Bürer	South Africa	4:31.9
3	Paolo Galletti	Italy	4:36.6
4	Milan Jeger	Yugoslavia	4:41.4
5	Zakaria Nasution	Indonesia	4:54.0
6	Amiram Trauber	Israel	4:58.6
7	Robert Chenaux	Puerto Rico	5:24.6

==== Heat Five ====
Rank	Athlete	Country	Time
1	Murray McLachlan	South Africa	4:25.9
2	Gene Lenz	United States	4:29.2
3	Jean-Pascal Curtillet	France	4:36.5
4	Rubén Roca	Cuba	4:41.3
5	José Cossio	Spain	4:50.1
6	Fong Seow Jit	Malaya	5:07.3

==== Heat Six ====
Rank	Athlete	Country	Time
1	Alan Somers	United States	4:19.2
2	Mauricio Ocampo	Mexico	4:35.3
3	Gerhard Hetz	Germany	4:38.4
4	Bana Sailani	Philippines	4:40.2
5	Jan Lutomski	Poland	4:42.8
6	Massimo Rosi	Italy	4:45.1
7	Hans-Ulrich Dürst	Switzerland	4:52.5

=== Final ===
Rank	Athlete	Country	Time	Notes
1	Murray Rose	Australia	4:18.3	OR
2	Tsuyoshi Yamanaka	Japan	4:21.4	
3	John Konrads	Australia	4:21.8	
4	Ian Black	Great Britain	4:21.8	
5	Alan Somers	United States	4:22.0	
6	Murray McLachlan	South Africa	4:26.3	
7	Gene Lenz	United States	4:26.8	
8	Makoto Fukui	Japan	4:29.6	

Key: OR = Olympic record
