= Shooting at the 1960 Summer Olympics – Men's 25 metre rapid fire pistol =

Men's 25 metre rapid fire pistol at the Games of the XVII Olympiad
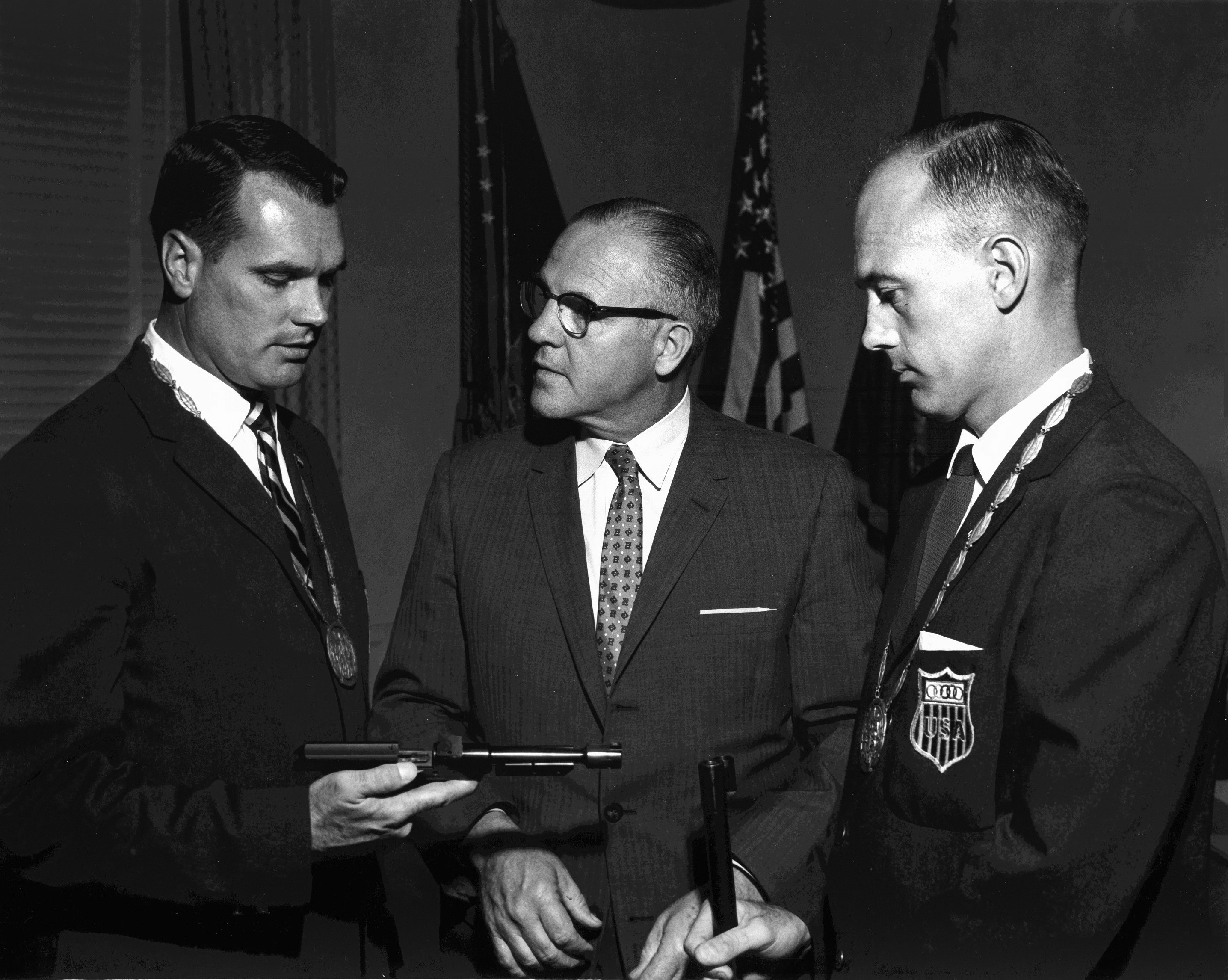
- William McMillan (left) being commended by the Commandant of the Marine Corps after winning the rapid fire pistol event
- Venue: Umberto I Shooting Range
- Dates: 8–9 September 1960
- Competitors: 57 from 35 nations
- Winning score: 587 =OR

Medalists
1st place, gold medalist(s)		William McMillan; United States
2nd place, silver medalist(s)		Pentti Linnosvuo; Finland
3rd place, bronze medalist(s)		Aleksandr Zabelin; Soviet Union

The men's ISSF 25 meter rapid fire pistol was a shooting sports event held as part of the Shooting at the 1960 Summer Olympics programme. It was the 11th appearance of the event. The competition was held on 8 and 9 September 1960 at the shooting ranges in Rome. 57 shooters from 35 nations competed. Nations had been limited to two shooters each since the 1952 Games. The event was won by William McMillan of the United States, the nation's first victory in the event since 1924 and third overall (most of any nation). Silver went to Pentti Linnosvuo of Finland, similarly taking his nation's first medal since 1924. Aleksandr Zabelin of the Soviet Union earned bronze. The three men had tied for first after the main round of 60 shots and had required a three-way shoot-off to determine the medals.

== Background ==
This was the 11th appearance of what had been standardised in 1948 as the men's ISSF 25 meter rapid fire pistol event, the only event on the 2020 programme that traces back to 1896. The event has been held at every Summer Olympics except 1904 and 1928 (when no shooting events were held) and 1908; it was nominally open to women from 1968 to 1980, although very few women participated these years. There is no women's equivalent on the Olympic programme, as of 2021. The first five events were quite different, with some level of consistency finally beginning with the 1932 event—which, though it had differences from the 1924 competition, was roughly similar. The 1936 competition followed the 1932 one quite closely. The post-World War II event substantially altered the competition once again.

Six of the top 10 shooters from 1956 returned: gold medalist Ștefan Petrescu of Romania, silver medalist Yevgeny Cherkasov of the Soviet Union, fourth-place finisher (and 1952 fifth-place finisher) Pentti Linnosvuo of Finland, fifth-place finisher Oscar Cervo of Argentina, seventh-place finisher Kalle Sievänen of Finland, and tenth-place finisher Carlos Monteverde of Venezuela. Reigning world champion and world record holder Aleksandr Kropotin of the Soviet Union did not compete in Rome; fellow Soviet runner-up (and co-record holder, having lost to Kropotin in a shoot-off) Alexander Zabelin was. Petrescu had finished third at the world championships. William McMillan, who had finished seventh at the 1952 Olympics and second at the 1954 world championships before missing the 1956 Games due to equipment failure at the U.S. trials, also returned.

The Republic of China, India, Morocco, Pakistan, South Korea, Thailand, and the United Arab Republic each made their debut in the event; East and West Germany competed together as the United Team of Germany for the first time. The United States made its ninth appearance in the event, most of any nation.

== Competition format ==
The competition format followed the 1948 format, now very close to the modern rapid fire pistol competition after significant variation before World War II. Each shooter fired 60 shots. These were done in two courses of 30; each course consisted of two stages of 15; each stage consisted of three series of 5. In each stage, the time limit for each series was 8 seconds for the first, 6 seconds for the second, and 4 seconds for the third.

A holdover from the previous Games was that full-body silhouettes, rather than round targets, continued to be used; however, scoring rings had been added so that now each shot was scored up to 10 rather than being strictly hit or miss. Ties for medals were broken with a shoot-off. The shoot-off was three series of 5 shots, each with a 4-second time limit.

One change from 1948–1956 was that hits were no longer the primary measurement of success. Ranking was now done by score, regardless of hits.

== Records ==
Prior to the competition, the existing world and Olympic records were as follows.

World record	Aleksandr Kropotin (URS); Alexander Zabelin (URS)	592	Moscow, Soviet Union	1958
Olympic record	Ștefan Petrescu (ROU)	587	Melbourne, Australia	4–5 December 1956

The three medalists all matched the Olympic record at 587 points.

== Schedule ==
Date	Time	Round
Thursday, 8 September 1960	9:00	Course 1
Friday, 9 September 1960	9:00	Course 2

== Results ==
Rank	Shooter	Nation	Score	Notes
1st place, gold medalist(s)	William McMillan	United States	587	=OR, shoot-off: 147
2nd place, silver medalist(s)	Pentti Linnosvuo	Finland	587	=OR, shoot-off: 139
3rd place, bronze medalist(s)	Aleksandr Zabelin	Soviet Union	587	=OR, shoot-off: 135
4	Hansruedi Schneider	Switzerland	586	
5	Ștefan Petrescu	Romania	585	
6	Gavril Maghiar	Romania	583	
7	Czesław Zając	Poland	582	
8	Jiří Hrneček	Czechoslovakia	582	
9	Josef Šváb	Czechoslovakia	581	
10	Jan Wallén	Sweden	580	
11	Stig Berntsson	Sweden	580	
12	Yevgeny Cherkasov	Soviet Union	579	
13	Tony Clark	Great Britain	579	
14	Heinz Franke	United Team of Germany	579	
15	Ferenc Kun	Hungary	578	
16	Laurence Mosely	United States	577	
17	Kalle Sievänen	Finland	576	
18	Luis Palomo	Spain	576	
19	Luis Jiménez	Mexico	576	
20	Heinrich Gollwitzer	United Team of Germany	575	
21	Jean Renaux	France	575	
22	Jacques Decaux	France	575	
23	Roberto Mazzoni	Italy	573	
24	Robert Hassell	Great Britain	573	
25	József Gyönyörű	Hungary	573	
26	Carlos Crassus	Venezuela	572	
27	Carlos Monteverde	Venezuela	571	
28	Héctor Elizondo	Mexico	570	
29	Sergio Varetto	Italy	570	
30	Fumio Ryosenan	Japan	569	
31	Michael Papps	Australia	569	
32	Oscar Cervo	Argentina	567	
33	Alkiviadis Papageorgopoulos	Greece	566	
34	Prateep Polphantin	Thailand	565	
35	Osamu Ochiai	Japan	565	
36	Guillermo Cornejo	Peru	564	
37	Hans Albrecht	Switzerland	563	
38	Minervino González	Spain	561	
39	Garfield McMahon	Canada	558	
40	Leon Lyon	Puerto Rico	558	
41	Pedro García Sr.	Peru	557	
42	Ambrosio Rocha	Brazil	556	
43	Neville Sayers	Australia	552	
44	Sim Mun-seop	South Korea	552	
45	Ali El-Kashef	United Arab Republic	550	
46	Sumol Sumontame	Thailand	549	
47	Chen An-hu	Formosa	546	
48	Georgios Marmaridis	Greece	544	
49	Rogério Tavares	Portugal	542	
50	António Martins	Portugal	537	
51	Per Nielsen	Denmark	532	
52	Nicolaus Zwetnow	Norway	531	
53	Horacio Miranda	Philippines	531	
54	Naji El-Mekki	Morocco	501	
55	Muhammad Iqbal	Pakistan	501	
56	Godfrey Brunner	Canada	493	
57	Paul Cheema Singh	India	434	
