= Paul Cheema Singh =

Indian sports shooter

Personal information
- Born: 26 September 1920 Kalakh, Ludhiana, India

Sport
- Sport: Sports shooting

Paul Cheema Singh (born 26 September 1920) is an Indian former sports shooter. He competed in the 25 metre pistol event at the 1960 Summer Olympics.
