= Gollwitzer =

Origin
- Language: German (Slavic-origin toponym + -er)
- Meaning: "from Gollwitz" (2 places in Brandenburg, and 1 in Mecklenburg)
- Region of origin: originally northern Germany, then moved to Bavaria

Other names
- Variant form: ?

Gollwitzer is a German surname. Notable people with the surname include:

- Friedrich Gollwitzer (1889–1977), German general
- Heinrich Gollwitzer (born 1923), German sports shooter
- Heinz Gollwitzer (1917–1999), German historian
- Helmut Gollwitzer (1908–1993), German Protestant theologian and author
- Michael Gollwitzer, false name of Heinrich Seetzen (1906–1945)
- Peter Gollwitzer (born 1950), German professor of psychology
- Thomas Gollwitzer (born 1966), German tennis player
