= Filiberto Mercado =

Mexican cyclist

Personal information
- Born: 28 June 1938 (age 88) Pachuca, Mexico
- Height: 1.62 m (5 ft 4 in)
- Weight: 60 kg (132 lb)

Cycling career
- Sport: Cycling
- Current team: Retired
- Discipline: Road
- Role: Rider

Filiberto Mercado (born 28 June 1938) is a Mexican former cyclist. He competed in the individual road race and team time trial events at the 1960 Summer Olympics.

At the 1959 Pan American Games, he won the silver medal in the team time trial. At the 1962 Central American and Caribbean Games, he won the road race ahead of Gregorio Carrizalez and finished third in the team time trial with Jacinto Brito, Mauricio Mata and Melesio Soto. In 1964, he took a stage win in the Vuelta de la Juventud Mexicana.
