= Siimar =

Family name

Siimar is an Estonian surname. Notable people with the surname include:

- Kristofer Siimar (born 1998), Estonian tennis player
- Mattias Siimar (born 1998), Estonian tennis player
- Veiko Siimar (born 1941), Estonian swimmer
