= Raúl Guzmán =

Raúl Guzmán may refer to:

- Raúl Guzmán (swimmer)
- Raúl Guzmán (racing driver)
