= Ferenc Kun =

Hungarian sports shooter

Personal information
- Born: 24 August 1930 Budapest, Hungary
- Died: 6 March 2009 (aged 78)

Sport
- Sport: Sports shooting

Ferenc Kun (24 August 1930 – 6 March 2009) was a Hungarian sports shooter. He competed in the 25 metre pistol event at the 1960 Summer Olympics.
