= Steve Rabinovitch =

Canadian swimmer (1942–1990)

- Steve Rabinovitch, 1959 at 17

Personal information
- Full name: Steven David Rabinovitch
- Born: 25 August 1942 Paris, France
- Died: 11 July 1990 (aged 47) Marietta, Georgia
- Occupation: Pilot
- Height: 179 cm (5 ft 10 in)
- Weight: 73 kg (161 lb)

Sport
- Sport: Swimming
- Event: 100, 200 breaststroke
- Strokes: Breaststroke
- Club: Davis YMHA; Palestre Nationale
- College team: University of Michigan
- Coach: Claude Marie (Palestre Nationale); Gus Stager (U. Michigan)
Medal record
Representing Canada
British Empire and Commonwealth Games
Bronze medal – third place	1962 Perth	110yd breaststroke
Bronze medal – third place	1962 Perth	4×110yd medley relay
Pan American Games
Silver medal – second place	1959 Chicago	4×100m medley relay

Steven David Rabinovitch (25 August 1942 – 11 July 1990) was a Montreal-born Canadian breaststroke swimmer who competed for the University of Michigan. He represented Canada in two events at the 1960 Summer Olympics, and held Canadian and Quebec provincial records in breaststroke events. He later was active in Masters Swimming and worked as a pilot for Eastern Airlines while based in Miami, Florida.

== Early life ==
Rabinovitch was born 25 August 1942 in Paris, France to father Dr. Reuben Rabinovitch, a native of La Macaza, Quebec, and mother Denise Genatzy Rabinovitch, a French native of St. Etienne. Steve's father Reuben, born in 1908, was a well-known neurologist in Montreal, a recipient of the 1947 United States Medal of Freedom, and President of the Canadian Neurological Society. He received his master's degree at McGill University in 1947 and his MD at the University of Paris in 1940, where after the fall of France, Dr. Rabinovitch worked with the French underground aiding injured Allied airmen. Steven was born while his father was in Paris, during the German occupation of WWII.

During his High School swimming career, Steve attended Montreal's Outremont High School and swam for the Davis YMHA, distinguishing himself in breast stroke by the age of 14. Representing Outremont High in 1959, he became a Montreal area champion at the Class Four Greater Montreal Interscholastic Amateur Athletic Championship, winning the freestyle and breastroke events, and swimming on Outremont's winning relay team. At the Quebec Provincial Indoor Championships on May 14, 1960, at Montreal's McGill Memorial Pool, he set a Provincial record in the 220-yard breaststroke of 2:42.8. Improving on his performance at the Montreal Interscholastic Championship, Rabinovitch led Outremont High to a team championship at the Class 4A Interscholastic Swimming meet on February 10, 1960, winning the freestyle, breaststroke, backstroke, and butterfly competition.

At 17, on 13 July 1960, Rabinovitch set a Canadian Open-age record in the 200-meter breaststroke with a time of 2:42.3 at the Canadian Championships and Olympic Trials.

== 1960 Rome Olympics ==
At the late August, 1960 Summer Olympics in Rome, Rabinovitch represented Canada in the 200-meter breaststroke swimming in the 4th preliminary heat where he finished fifth, placing him 25th overall with a time of 2:47.2. He swam breaststroke in the second leg of the 4×100-meter medley relay with the Canadian team of Bob Wheaton Cam Grout, and Dick Pound, making the finals and placing 4th with a combined time of 4:16.8.

=== International competition highlights ===
In the 1959 Pan American Games in Chicago, Rabinovitch placed second, taking the silver medal in the 4×100 metres medley with teammates Cam Grout, Bob Wheaton, Cam Grout, and Peter Fowler who was not an Olympian. At the 1962 British Empire and Commonwealth Games in Perth, Australia, he won a bronze medal in the 110-yard breaststroke, and a second bronze in the 4×110-yard medley relay.

Coached by Claude Marie with the Palestre Nationale Club, Rabinovitch set a Quebec Provincial record of 2:28.6 in the 200-yard breast stroke at an open meet at Montreal's Snowden YMHA on February 13, 1960, and swam the breaststroke on the first place 4×100-yard Medley Relay setting a provincial record of 4:10.1, and taking the Stober Trophy.

In December, 1960, swimming for the Palestre Nationale team, he would lower his mark in the 100-yard breast stroke to 1:04.1, a new Canadian record. Representing the Palestre Nationale Club in March, 1961, he swam his best post-Olympic times, lowering his former mark and re-setting a Canadian record of 1:02.8 for the Senior Men's Class in the 100-yard breast stroke at the Junior City and District Swimming Championships.

On August 29, 1961, Rabinovitch trained in Toronto with Coach Marris Van Nooten to compete at the 1961 Maccabiah Games in Tel Aviv which opened on August 31, 1961. In 1963, at the Commonwealth Games Time Trials, he set a Provincial record in the 100-meter breaststroke of 1:11.2.

=== University of Michigan ===
Rabinovitch attended the University of Michigan from around 1960–1965, where he swam under Hall of Fame Coach Gus Stager. A top-rated Division I team, Michigan won the NCAA National Team Championship in 1961, defeating runner-up University of Southern California. Rabinovitch took time in the summer of 1963 to attend the Canadian National Swimming Championships, where on July 26, 1963, he placed first in the 200-meter breaststroke with a time of 2:43.3. Competing for Michigan's Varsity swim team, he swam the breaststroke leg on Michigan's winning 400-yard medley that recorded a combined time of 3:44.4, helping the team to defeat the University of Cincinnati on 21 February 1964.

He trained in late October 1962 in Victoria, British Columbia with Empire Games Coach Ed Healy, for the 1962 British Empire Games.

=== Post swimming life ===
Rabinovich remained in the Montreal area through the mid-60's. By 1972, at 29, he worked as a pilot for Eastern Airlines based in Miami, where he was active in Masters Swimming. In June, 1973, Rabinovitch was a National United States Master's Champion in the 100 and 200-yard breaststroke event in the 30-35 age group. Between 1972 and 1979, between the ages of 29–39, Rabinovitch swam with United States Masters Swimming, competing with the Florida Gold Coast Masters and competing primarily in 50, 100, and 200-meter breaststroke events. Rabinovitch had been a founder of America's National Amateur Athletic Union (AAU) Master's Swimming program.

Rabinovich died in Marietta, Georgia on 11 July 1990. He had been predeceased in 1978 by his wife Louise Mercier. He had two brothers, Alex who studied as a physician in Victoria, Albert, and a sister Silvie, who all lived in Montreal through the 1960s.
