= Jan Wallén =

Swedish sports shooter

Personal information
- Born: 6 June 1935 (age 91) Kristianstad, Sweden

Sport
- Sport: Sports shooting

Jan Wallén (born 6 June 1935) is a Swedish former sports shooter. He competed in the 25 metre pistol event at the 1960 Summer Olympics.
