= Sáránd =

Coordinates: 47°24′N 21°38′E

- Interactive map of Sáránd
- Country: Hungary
- County: Hajdú-Bihar

Area
  - Total: 22.68 km^{2} (8.76 sq mi)

Population (2001)
  - Total: 2,342
  - Density: 103.3/km^{2} (268/sq mi)
- Time zone: UTC+1 (CET)
  - Summer (DST): UTC+2 (CEST)
- Postal code: 4272
- Area code: 52
- Website: www.sarand.hu

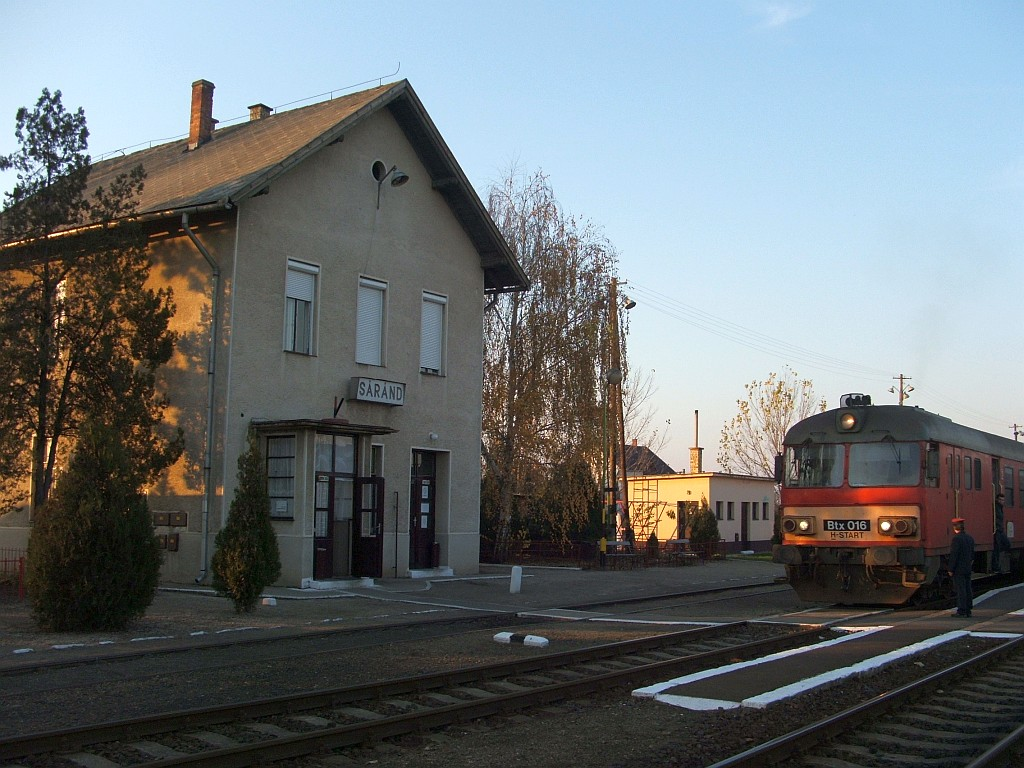
Sáránd

Sáránd is a village in Eastern Hungary, in Hajdú-Bihar county, with a small Romanian population. Olympian József Gyönyörű was born here.
