= Rolf Burggraf =

Swiss swimmer

Personal information
- Born: 31 October 1937 (age 88) Basel, Switzerland

Sport
- Sport: Swimming

Rolf Burggraf (born 31 October 1937) is a Swiss former swimmer. He competed in the men's 100 metre backstroke at the 1960 Summer Olympics, where he was eliminated in the heats.
