= Heinz Franke =

German sports shooter (born 1928)

Personal information
- Born: 4 August 1928 Wurzen, Germany

Sport
- Sport: Sports shooting

Heinz Franke (born 4 August 1928) is a German former sports shooter. He competed in the 25 metre pistol event at the 1960 Summer Olympics.
