= Laurence Mosely =

American sports shooter (born 1933)

Personal information
- Born: May 10, 1933 (age 93) Brooklyn, New York, U.S.

Sport
- Sport: Sports shooting

Laurence Mosely (born May 10, 1933) is an American former sports shooter. He competed in the 25 metre pistol event at the 1960 Summer Olympics.
