= Aleksandr Zabelin =

Russian sport shooter

Personal information
- Born: 6 December 1931 Matveyevsk, Russian SFSR, Soviet Union

Sport
- Sport: Sports shooting
Medal record
Men's shooting
Representing Soviet Union
Olympic Games
Bronze medal – third place	1960 Rome	25m pistol

Aleksandr Nikolayevich Zabelin (Russian: Александр Николаевич Забелин; born 6 December 1931) is a Russian former sport shooter who competed in the 1960 Summer Olympics and in the 1964 Summer Olympics. He won the bronze medal in the 25m pistol event at the 1960 Summer Olympics.
