= Ali El-Kashef =

Egyptian sports shooter

Personal information
- Born: 1917 Cairo, Egypt

Sport
- Sport: Sports shooting

Ali El-Kashef (born 1917, date of death unknown) was an Egyptian sports shooter. He competed in the 25 metre pistol event at the 1960 Summer Olympics.
