= Fumio Ryosenan =

Japanese sports shooter

Personal information
- Born: 10 February 1927 Hiroshima, Japan

Sport
- Sport: Sports shooting

Fumio Ryosenan (了泉庵 文男, Ryosenan Fumio; born 10 February 1927) is a Japanese former sports shooter. He competed in the 25 metre pistol event at the 1960 Summer Olympics and 1962 Asian Games.
