= Josef Šváb =

Czech sport shooter

Personal information
- Born: 8 June 1933 (age 93) Plzeň, Czechoslovakia

Sport
- Sport: Sport shooting

Josef Šváb (born 8 June 1933) is a Czech former sport shooter. He competed in the 25 metre pistol event at the 1960 Summer Olympics.
