= Pedro García (sport shooter) =

Peruvian sports shooter (1928–1980)

Personal information
- Born: 2 May 1928 Talara, Peru
- Died: 12 July 1980 (aged 52) Lima, Peru

Sport
- Sport: Sports shooting

Pedro García (2 May 1928 – 12 July 1980) was a Peruvian sports shooter. He competed in the 25 metre pistol event at the 1960 Summer Olympics.
