= Helmut Ilk =

Austrian swimmer

Personal information
- Born: 11 July 1936 (age 90) Linz, Austria

Sport
- Sport: Swimming

Helmut Ilk (born 11 July 1936) is an Austrian former freestyle swimmer. He competed in the men's 400 metre freestyle at the 1960 Summer Olympics.
