= Roberto Mazzoni =

Italian sports shooter

Personal information
- Born: 9 January 1937 (age 89) Florence, Italy

Sport
- Sport: Sports shooting

Roberto Mazzoni (born 9 January 1937) is an Italian former sports shooter. He competed in the 25 metre pistol event at the 1960 Summer Olympics.
