= Tamás Hornyánszky =

Hungarian swimmer

Personal information
- Nationality: Hungarian
- Born: 1 February 1942 (age 84) Budapest, Hungary

Sport
- Sport: Swimming

Tamás Hornyánszky (born 1 February 1942) is a Hungarian former swimmer. He competed in the men's 400 metre freestyle at the 1960 Summer Olympics.
