= József Gyönyörű =

Hungarian sports shooter

Personal information
- Born: 19 March 1925 Sáránd, Hungary
- Died: 18 September 1999 (aged 74) Budapest, Hungary

Sport
- Sport: Sports shooting

József Gyönyörű (19 March 1925 – 18 September 1999) was a Hungarian sports shooter. He competed in the 25 metre pistol event at the 1960 Summer Olympics.
