= Rudy Muller =

Luxembourgish swimmer

Personal information
- Born: 23 February 1942 (age 84) Luxembourg, Luxembourg

Sport
- Sport: Swimming

Rudy Muller (born 23 February 1942) is a Luxembourgish former swimmer. He competed in the men's 100 metre backstroke at the 1960 Summer Olympics, where he was eliminated in the heats.
