= Jesús Elizondo =

Mexican sport shooter (1930–2009)

Personal information
- Born: Jesús Alfonso Elizondo Nájera; 30 October 1930 Mexico City, Mexico
- Died: 12 March 2009 (aged 78) Tamaulipas, Mexico

Sport
- Sport: Shooting

Jesús Alfonso Elizondo Nájera (30 October 1930 – 12 March 2009) was a Mexican sport shooter. He competed at the 1964, 1968, and 1972 Summer Olympics. He was the younger brother of Héctor Elizondo.
