= Cam Grout =

Canadian swimmer (born 1939)

Personal information
- Full name: Robert Cameron Lundy Grout
- Nationality: Canadian
- Born: 23 October 1939 (age 86) Montreal, Quebec, Canada
- Occupation: Investment Consultant
- Height: 179 cm (5 ft 10 in)
- Weight: 79 kg (174 lb)
- Spouse: Marsha Leigh Beaton (1968)
- Children: 2 daughters

Sport
- Sport: Swimming
- Event(s): 100 freestyle Individual Medley, Medley Relay
- Strokes: Butterfly, Freestyle
- Club: Montreal Amateur Ath. Assoc. SC
- College team: McGill University (1962)
Medal record
Men's swimming
Representing Canada
British Empire and Commonwealth Games
| Bronze medal – third place | 1958 Cardiff | 4×220 yd freestyle |
Pan American Games
| Silver medal – second place | 1959 Chicago | 4×100 m medley |
| Bronze medal – third place | 1959 Chicago | 4×200 m freestyle |

Robert Cameron "Cam" Lundy Grout (born October 23, 1939) is a Canadian former butterfly and freestyle swimmer who swam for the Montreal Amateur Athletic Association and McGill University and represented Canada in the 1960 Rome Olympics.

Grout was born October 23, 1939, in of Montreal, Quebec, to Mr. and Mrs. Robert Lundy Grout and attended Montreal's Lower Canada College in High School. At the age of 13, he started swimming and competing with the Montreal Amateur Athletic Association, appearing as (MAAA) in publications.

In his swimming career, Grout would hold a variety of provincial records for Quebec as well as Canadian records. In January, 1960, he set a Canadian record for the 400 Individual Medley at the MAAA pool in Montreal with a time of 4:41. In the same meet, he set a Canadian record in the 100-yard freestyle of 50.3.

== 1960 Rome Olympics ==
He competed in three events at the 1960 Summer Olympics in Rome, placing 18th in the 100-meter freestyle with a time of 58.0, 21st in the 200 meter butterfly with a time of 2:27.7.

In the 4x100 meter Medley Relay, where the Canadian team finished fourth and made the finals with a time of 4:16.8, Grout swam the butterfly leg with Canadian teammates Bob Wheaton, Steve Rabinovitch, and Dick Pound. The Americans were heavily favored and took the gold with a large seven second margin, recording a combined time 4:05.4.

== McGill University ==
Grout attended McGill University, graduating with a B.S. in Science in 1962. He competed for McGill for three years from 1957-1960 with the water polo and swim teams. During his collegiate swimming career he captured eight intercollegiate titles, and established school records in 10 swimming events, with specialties in butterfly, freestyle and individual medley. Grout set University records in the 50, 100, 220 and 440-yard freestyles and the 100 & 200 butterfly. In relay events, he swam with teams that set McGill records in the 200 and 400 individual medley, the 4x100 medley relay, and the 4x100 freestyle relay.

=== International competition ===
In international competition, at the 1958 British Empire and Commonwealth Games Grout placed third in the 4×220 yards Freestyle Relay with the team of Kenneth Williams, William Slater, and the non-Olympian Peter Bell. In the 1959 Pan American Games, his team placed 2nd for a silver medal in the 4×100 metres medley with Bob Wheaton, Steve Rabinovitch, and the non-Olympian Peter Fowler, and 3rd for a bronze medal in the 4×200 metres freestyle with the non-Olympians Edward Cazalet, William Campbell, and Thomas Verth. At the same 1958 British Empire and Commonwealth games, in individual events, Grout finished fourth and out of medal contention in both the 100-yard freestyle and the 220-yard butterfly.

At the 1959 Summer Pan American games in Chicago, Grout's Canadian team won a silver medal in the 4x100 meter medley relay, and a bronze in the 4x200 meter freestyle relay.

=== Post swimming careers ===
In July, 1968 at the age of 27, Grout married Marsha Leigh Beaton of Winnipeg, Manitoba at St. Andrews River Heights United Church in Winnipeg. The couple honeymooned in Cape Cod and New York.

Grout attempted to continue recreational swimming for many years after the Olympics, and swam with Masters Swimming into his 40's, but his career and personal life eventually took precedence.

After retiring from his competitive swimming career, Grout had a career as an investment consultant retiring in 2007. After relocating with work to Oakville, Ontario, he continuing in his investment career, and later served as Oakville's, chairman of Parks and Recreation, and on the board of Sheridan College and the Oakville Harbour Authority. He had two daughters with wife Marsha.

=== Honors ===
In 1959-1960, Grout won the Forbes trophy, presented to the McGill University male athlete of the year. He was inducted into the McGill University Sports Hall of Fame in 2002. For both the years 1958 and 1959, Montreal Sportsman Association selected Grout as amateur athlete of the year. In late 2009, at age 70, Grout was honored to carry the Olympic torch for 350 meters through New Brunswick as part of the 28,000 mile Cross Canada Olympic torch relay prior to the 2010 Vancouver Olympics.
