= Alan Somers =

American swimmer (born 1941)

Alan B. Somers
Personal information
- Full name: Alan Brounell Somers
- National team: United States
- Born: July 30, 1941 (age 85) Indianapolis, Indiana, U.S.
- Height: 6 ft 1 in (1.85 m)
- Weight: 163 lb (74 kg)
- Spouse: Kathryn "Kitch" Kenealy

Sport
- Sport: Swimming
- Events: 1,500-meter, 400-meter Distance events
- Strokes: Freestyle
- Club: Indianapolis Athletic Club
- Coach: William P. Despres Jr. (IAC); James Counsilman (IAC); James Counsilman (Indiana)
Medal record
Men's swimming
Representing the United States
Pan American Games
Gold medal – first place	1959 Chicago	1,500 m freestyle

Alan Brounell Somers (born July 30, 1941) is an American former competition swimmer and world record holder who competed for Indiana University and represented the United States at the 1960 Rome Olympics in the 400- and 1,500-meter freestyle events. After graduating from Indiana University medical center, he worked as a Bloomington, Indiana-based neurologist, and was affiliated with Bloomington Hospital.

== Early life and swimming ==
Somers was born July 30, 1941, in Indianapolis, Indiana to Earl J. and Roberta Somers. His father was an accountant for General Motors' Allison Division. His younger sister by eight years, Bobbie Lynn, would also compete in swimming. He attended Arsenal Technical High School, usually referred to as Technical High School, and began competing in swimming around 14, training first with the Westwood Club swim team and then in High School with the Indianapolis Athletic Club's swim team, where his coaches included Jim Clark who was succeeded in 1957 by William Paul Despres Jr. Somers may have also received some coaching from Gene Lee, who coached through 1962.

Somer's future coach at Indiana, James Counsilman, also assisted with the coaching of the IAC team primarily as a volunteer assistant, particularly during the IAC team's August 1958–59 national championship year. Despres, who began as Head Coach of the IAC in the summer of 1957, was a former butterfly and freestyle competitor and conference champion for North Carolina State, who served as an Assistant Coach at North Carolina and helped coach two-time Olympian Mike Troy at the IAC. The Indianapolis Athletic Club's team won the National American Athletic Union Senior team Outdoor championship during Somers's tenure with the team from 1957 to 1958. A talented scholar, Somers graduated Technical High in the upper quarter of his class around the Spring of 1959 and by his High School Senior year was already considering a pre-medical college major.

== International highlights and records ==
In International competition, Somers captured a gold medal in 1959 in the 1500-meter freestyle at the Summer Pan American Games in Chicago. On July 23, 1960, in Toledo, Ohio, he set a world Long Course record of 8:17.0 swimming as part of a 4 × 200 m freestyle relay team. The record held through August 6, 1960. In July 1960, he broke his own American record in the 1,500-meter freestyle with a time of 17:43.1 at the state-wide AAU meet in Evansville, Indiana.

== 1960 Rome Olympics ==
Just turning 19, after his Freshman year at Indiana, he attended the 1960 Olympic trials at Brennan Pools in Detroit, and won the 400 meter trial finals with a time of 4:25.1, placing just ahead of Eugene Lenz of Santa Monica. Somers swam the 1500-meter Olympic trial final in a time of 17:40, placing first and just barely edging out former Indiana University swimmer George Breen who placed second, but was given the same finish time. Somers subsequently qualified for the 1960 Olympics in both the 400- and 1,500-meter events.

At the 1960 Rome Olympics, Somers competed in the men's 400-meter freestyle, finishing fifth in the event final with a time of 4:22.0. He also qualified for the final of the men's 1,500-meter freestyle, where he recorded a time of 18:02.8 and finished seventh overall. At the 1960 Olympics, Somers was coached by U.S. men's Olympic head coach Gus Stager.

Somers was a member of a U.S. team that set a new world record of 8:17.0 in the 4 × 200-meter freestyle relay on July 23, 1960. The record was broken by an Australian relay team less than a month later.

=== Indiana University ===
Somers attended Indiana University from around 1959–1964, where he swam for coach Doc Counsilman's Indiana Hoosiers swimming and diving team in National Collegiate Athletic Association (NCAA) competition, received a BS with a major in history, and was a member of Phi Cappa Psi. Part of an outstanding freshman class, the Indiana freshman defeated the Indiana varsity team in 1960, despite the varsity swimmers placing third at the NCAA nationals that year. In his collegiate career, Somers received eight All-American honors from the NCAA as a college athlete, and with a focus on distance events, won three Big Ten Conference individual championships in the 1,500-meter (1961, 1962) and 1,650-yard (1963) freestyle. His Big Ten Conference individual championships also included a title in the 400 freestyle event. In 1963, he served as the Indiana swim team's captain and earned varsity letters in the years 1961–1963.

Somers married Katherine Julia Kenealy on the morning of November 27, 1965 at Munster, Indiana's St. Thomas Moore Church. Katherine was a French and English major at Indiana, and was teaching French during the time of their marriage.

=== Post-swimming careers ===
He graduated from Indiana University School of Medicine in 1968 and specialized in neurology.

Somers's was a practicing neurologist in greater Bloomington for many years. He was affiliated as a consultant with the Bloomington Hospital of Orange County where he was a chief of the medical staff in 1982. By 1995, he associated as a consultant with Memorial Hospital in Jasper, Indiana about thirty miles south of Greater Bloomington, Indiana. During his medical career, he helped raised funds to establish athletic scholarships for Indiana's swimming and diving athletes. He met his wife Kitch while at Indiana.

As a United States Masters swimmer, Somers competed in the 1,500-meter event at the U.S. Masters Swimming Championships in late August, 1983, at Indiana's IUPUI pool in Indianapolis. He competed in the 400 and 500 freestyle events as well as sprint distances in 2006–07 and in 2016. He swam primarily for DOC IU Masters, an informal club that met at the Indiana Bloomington Pool and at a local YMCA.

=== Honors ===
Somers was inducted into the Indiana University Athletic Hall of Fame in 2009. In 2007, he received the Z.G. Clevinger award, awarded to Indiana University alumni who helped contribute to the university's sports programs.

== See also ==
- List of Indiana University Bloomington people
- World record progression 4 × 200 metres freestyle relay
