= Dimitrios Kolovos =

Greek swimmer

Personal information
- Born: 1940 (age 85–86) Athens, Greece

Sport
- Sport: Swimming

Dimitrios Kolovos (born 1940) is a Greek former swimmer. He competed in the men's 100 metre backstroke at the 1960 Summer Olympics, where he was eliminated in the heats.
