= Jacques Decaux =

French sports shooter

Personal information
- Born: 9 March 1918 Leysin, Switzerland
- Died: 2003 (aged 84–85)

Sport
- Sport: Sports shooting

Jacques Decaux (9 March 1918 – 2003) was a French sports shooter. He competed in the 25 metre pistol event at the 1960 Summer Olympics.
