= Hans-Ulrich Millow =

German swimmer

Personal information
- Nationality: German
- Born: 17 March 1942 (age 84) Mecklenburg-Vorpommern, Germany

Sport
- Sport: Swimming

Hans-Ulrich Millow (born 17 March 1942) is a German former swimmer. He competed in the men's 1500 metre freestyle at the 1960 Summer Olympics.
