= Sim Mun-seop =

South Korean sports shooter

Personal information
- Born: 2 January 1932 Gangwon, Korea

Sport
- Sport: Sports shooting

Sim Mun-seop (born 2 January 1932) is a South Korean former sports shooter. He competed in the 25 metre pistol event at the 1960 Summer Olympics.
