= Kalakh =

- Village
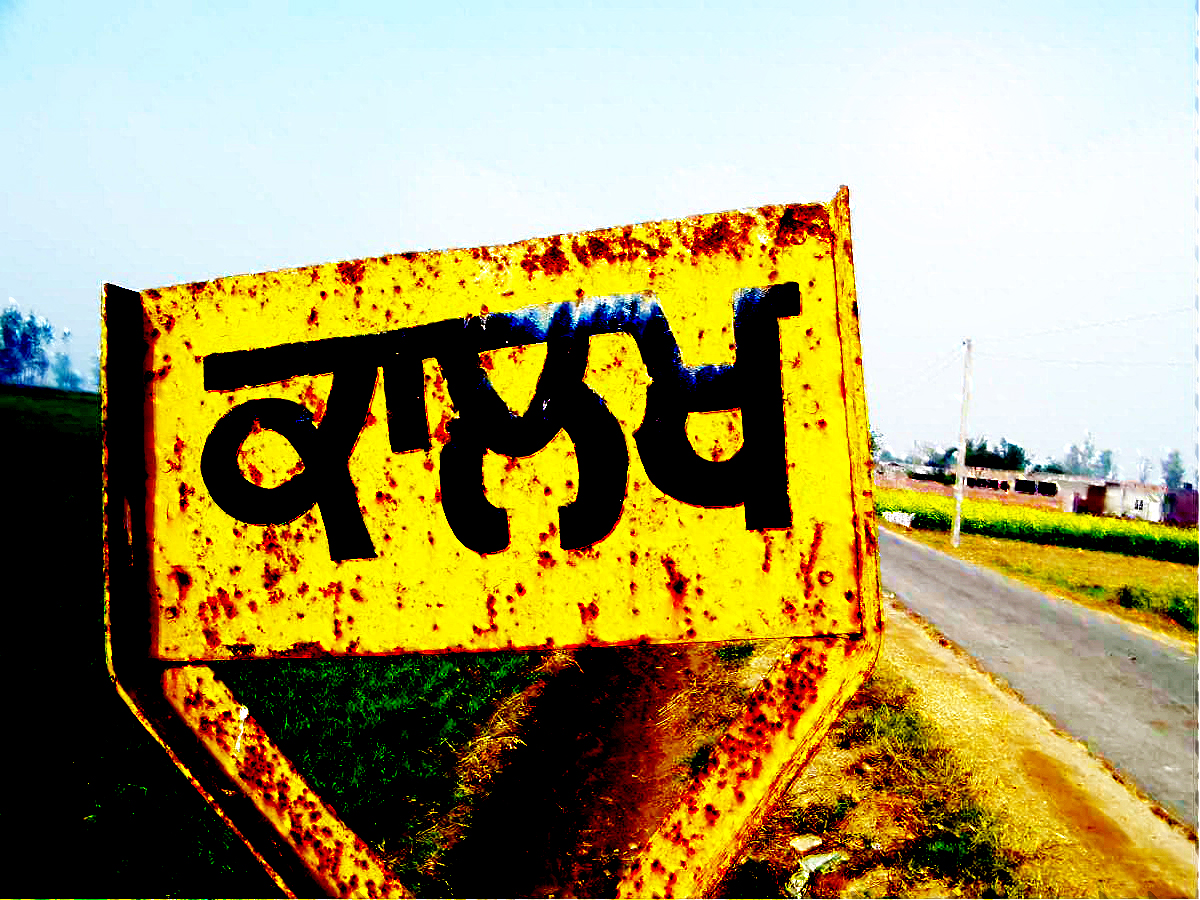

- Location within Punjab Location within India
- Coordinates: 30°43′02″N 75°47′06″E
- Country: India
- State: Punjab
- District: Ludhiana

Area
  - Total: 8 km^{2} (3.1 sq mi)

Population (2010)
  - Total: 4,458
  - Density: 560/km^{2} (1,400/sq mi)

Languages
  - Official: Punjabi
- Time zone: UTC+5:30 (IST)
- PIN: 141204
- Telephone code: 91-161-XXX XXXX
- Vehicle registration: PB 10

Kalakh is a village in Ludhiana district, Punjab, India.
