= Wolfgang Wagner (swimmer) =

German swimmer

Personal information
- Born: 6 August 1938 Gera, Germany
- Height: 1.89 m (6 ft 2 in)
- Weight: 77 kg (170 lb)

Sport
- Sport: Swimming
- Club: BSG Wismut Gera
Medal record
Men's swimming
Representing East Germany
European Championships
Bronze medal – third place	1958 Budapest	100 m backstroke
Silver medal – second place	1962 Leipzig	200 m backstroke

Wolfgang Wagner (born 6 August 1938) is a retired German backstroke swimmer who won two medals at LEN European Aquatics Championships in 1958 and 1962. He also competed at the 1960 (100 m backstroke and 4 × 100 m medley relay) and 1964 Summer Olympics (200 m backstroke) with the best achievement of sixth place in the 100 m backstroke.
