= Carlo Varetto =

Italian sports shooter

Personal information
- Born: 26 May 1905 Vergato, Bologna, Italy
- Died: 10 January 1966 (aged 60) Vergato, Bologna, Italy

Sport
- Sport: Sports shooting

Carlo Varetto (26 May 1905 – 10 January 1986) was an Italian shooter who competed at the 1936 and 1956 Olympics in 50 m rifle events. His son Sergio became an Olympic pistol shooter.

Carlo Varetto was born to Aldo Varetto (1879–1959), a keen pistol and rifle shooter who often competed alongside his son and then grandson. Carlo had an early and unsuccessful marriage, after which he remarried Annita Romagnoli a few years before the outbreak of World War II; their son Sergio was born in 1937. In the 1920s Carlo became one of the best Italian rifle shooters, which he demonstrated at an international competition in Turin in 1927. Between 1935 and 1958 he won at least 10 Italian Championships of the Armed Forces and was included into the national team for the 1936 and 1956 Olympics. He died in 1986 in Vergato.
