= Ünsal Fikirci =

Turkish swimmer

Personal information
- Born: 3 October 1939 Adana, Turkey
- Died: 10 February 1992 (aged 52)

Sport
- Sport: Swimming

Ünsal Fikirci (3 October 1939 – 10 February 1992) was a Turkish former swimmer. He competed in two events at the 1960 Summer Olympics.
