= Sergio Varetto =

Italian sport shooter (1937–1981)

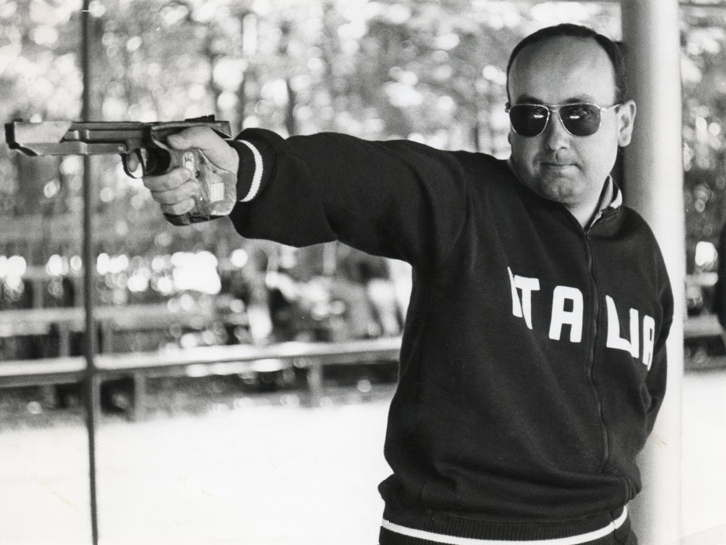

Personal information
- Born: 28 July 1937 Vergato, Bologna, Italy
- Died: 8 January 1981 (aged 43) Vergato, Bologna, Italy
- Height: 1.82 m (6 ft 0 in)
- Weight: 82 kg (181 lb)

Sport
- Sport: Pistol shooting
Medal record
Representing Italy
World Championships
| Bronze medal – third place | 1962 Cairo | 25 m rapid fire pistol, team |

Sergio Varetto (28 July 1937 – 8 January 1981) was an Italian pistol shooter who competed in the 25 m rapid-fire pistol event at the 1960 Olympics.

Varetto was born to Carlo Varetto and Annita Romagnoli, he had an elder sister Luciana. His father competed at the 1936 and 1956 Olympics in rifle shooting. From the early age Sergio learned the use of guns in his family, and worked at a prominent watch and jewelry shop established in Vergato by his grandfather. In 1950 he took part in his first shooting contest, where he competed against his grandfather. By 1956 he became a leading Italian pistol shooter, yet he was not selected for the 1956 Olympics because he was considered too young and inexperienced. At the next Olympics he finished 29th in the individual 25 m rapid fire pistol, and in 1962 won a team bronze medal in this event.

On 24 February 1963 Varetto married Claudia Masotti; they had two sons, Aldo and Alberto. In 1963–1966 he won four consecutive national titles in the 25 m rapid-fire pistol, yet for uncertain reasons he was excluded from the 1964 Olympic team. In 1966 his father died, and Varetto retired from competitions to take care of the family and its watch and jewelry shop. He died of chronic hepatitis on 8 January 1981, aged 43.
