= Swimming at the 1959 Pan American Games =

Swimming at the I959 Pan American Games

The Swimming competition at the 3rd Pan American Games was held in Chicago, United States during the Games' run in 1959. It consisted of 16 long course (50 m) events: 8 for males and 8 for females.

In these Games, the U.S. swept all gold medals in swimming.

A world record was broken by the U.S. in the women's 4 × 100 m medley relay, with a time of 4:44.6.

== Results ==
=== Men ===
Event	Gold		Silver		Bronze	
100 m freestyle	Jeffrey Farrell (United States) USA	56.3	Elton Follett (United States) USA	57.2	William Woolsey (United States) USA	57.6
400 m freestyle	George Breen (United States) USA	4:31.4	George Harrison (United States) USA	4:31.8	Eugene Lenz (United States) USA	4:34.9
1500 m freestyle	Alan Somers (United States) USA	17:53.2	George Breen (United States) USA	17:55.0	Gary Heinrich (United States) USA	18:30.6
100 m backstroke	Frank McKinney (United States) USA	1:03.6	Charles Bittick (United States) USA	1:04.2	Louis Schaeffer (United States) USA	1:05.3
200 m breaststroke	Bill Mulliken (United States) USA	2:43.1	Kenneth Nakasone (United States) USA	2:43.2	Manuel Sanguily; Cuba	2:44.3
200 m butterfly	Dave Gillanders (United States) USA	2:18.0	Michael Troy (United States) USA	2:18.3	Eulalio Ríos; Mexico	2:22.5
4 × 200 m Free Relay	United States; Dick Blick; Peter Sintz; John Rounsavelle; Frank Winters	8:22.7	Mexico; Raúl Guzmán; Alfredo Guzmán; Jorge Escalante; Mauricio Ocampo	8:56.4	Canada; Cameron Grout; Edward Cazalet; William Campbell; Thomas Verth	9:00.4
4 × 100 m Medley Relay	United States; Frank McKinney; Kenneth Nakasone; Mike Troy; Jeff Farrell	4:14.9	Canada; Cameron Grout; Bob Wheaton; Steve Rabinovitch; Peter Fowler	4:23.3	Mexico; Eulalio Ríos; Alejandro Gaxiola; Jorge Escalante; Roberto Marmolejo	4:25.0

=== Women ===
Event	Gold		Silver		Bronze	
100 m freestyle	Chris von Saltza (United States) USA	1:03.8	Molly Botkin (United States) USA	1:05.7	Joan Spillane (United States) USA	1:05.8
200 m freestyle	Chris von Saltza (United States) USA	2:18.5	Shirley Stobs (United States) USA	2:22.9	Joan Spillane (United States) USA	2:23.0
400 m freestyle	Chris von Saltza (United States) USA	4:55.9	Sylvia Ruuska (United States) USA	5:03.4	Donna Graham (United States) USA	5:03.5
100 m backstroke	Carin Cone (United States) USA	1:12.2	Sara Barber; Canada	1:12.3	Christine Kluter (United States) USA	1:12.4
200 m breaststroke	Anne Warner (United States) USA	2:56.8	Patty Kemper (United States) USA	3:00.1	Anne Brancroft (United States) USA	3:01.3
100 m butterfly	Becky Collins (United States) USA	1:09.5	Nancy Ramey (United States) USA	1:10.4	Molly Botkin (United States) USA	1:12.3
4 × 100 m Free Relay	United States; Molly Botkin; Joan Spillane; Shirley Stobs; Chris von Saltza	4:17.5	Canada; Margaret Iwasaki; Helen Hunt; Sara Barber; Sandra Scott	4:31.9	Mexico; Blanca Barrón; María Luisa Souza; Gloria Botella; Rebeca García	4:37.0
4 × 100 m Medley Relay	United States; Carin Cone; Anne Brancroft; Becky Collins; Chris von Saltza	4:44.6; WR	Canada; Margaret Iwasaki; Janice Shepp; Sara Barber; Sandra Scott	4:58.7	Mexico; Blanca Barrón; Eulalia Martínez; Gloria Botella; Rebeca García	5:18.7

== Medal table ==
Rank	Nation	Gold	Silver	Bronze	Total
1	United States	16	11	10	37
2	Canada	0	4	1	5
3	Mexico	0	1	4	5
4	Cuba	0	0	1	1
Totals (4 entries)		16	16	16	48
