= Prateep Polphantin =

Thai sports shooter (born 1926)

Personal information
- Born: 16 July 1926 Bangkok, Thailand

Sport
- Sport: Sports shooting

Prateep Polphantin (born 16 July 1926) is a Thai former sports shooter. He competed in the 25 metre pistol event at the 1960 Summer Olympics and 1962 Asian Games.
