= Heinrich Gollwitzer =

German sports shooter

Personal information
- Born: 30 October 1923 Nuremberg, Germany

Sport
- Sport: Sports shooting
- Event: 25 metre rapid fire pistol

Heinrich Gollwitzer (born 30 October 1923) is a German former sports shooter. He competed in the 25 metre rapid fire pistol event at the 1960 Summer Olympics.

== Olympic Games ==
1960 Summer Olympics in Rome, competing for the United Team of Germany:

- Shooting – Men's 25 metre rapid fire pistol – 20th place
