= María Luisa Souza =

Mexican swimmer (born 1941)

Personal information
- Born: 21 November 1941 (age 84) Mexico City, Mexico

Sport
- Sport: Swimming
Medal record
Representing Mexico
Pan American Games
Bronze medal – third place	1959 Chicago	4x100m freestyle relay
Central American and Caribbean Games
Gold medal – first place	1959 Caracas	4x100m freestyle relay
Gold medal – first place	1962 Kingston	400m freestyle

María Luisa Souza (born 21 November 1941) is a Mexican former freestyle swimmer. She competed at the 1960 Summer Olympics and the 1964 Summer Olympics.
