= Héctor Elizondo (sport shooter) =

Mexican sport shooter (born 1925)

Personal information
- Born: Héctor Elizondo Nájera; 7 August 1925 Tampico, Tamaulipas, Mexico

Sport
- Sport: Shooting

Héctor Elizondo Nájera (born 7 August 1925) is a Mexican former sport shooter. He competed in the 25 metre rapid fire pistol event at the 1960 Summer Olympics. He is the older brother of Jesús Elizondo.
