= Gene Lenz =

American swimmer (1937–2005)

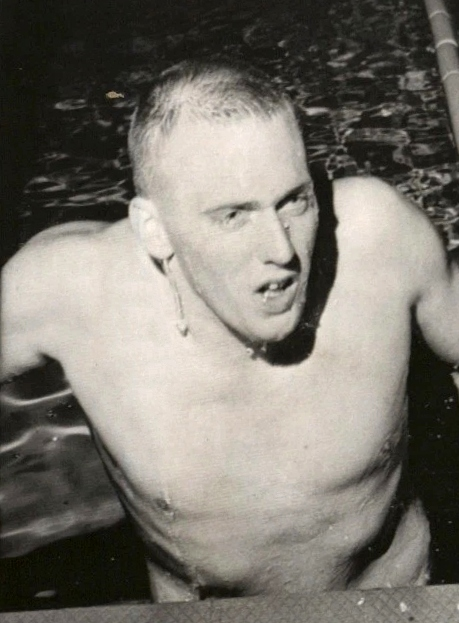
- Lenz at the height of his swimming career in 1959

Personal information
- Full name: Eugene Carl Lenz
- Nickname: "Gene"
- National team: United States
- Born: April 12, 1937 San Luis Obispo, California, U.S.
- Died: October 10, 2005 (aged 68) San Luis Obispo, California, U.S.
- Education: Cal Poly State University; Architectural Engineering (1960)
- Occupation: Construction Management
- Height: 5 ft 11 in (1.80 m)
- Weight: 174 lb (79 kg)
- Spouse: Ethel Amelia Simonfy (circa 1980)
- Children: 2

Sport
- Sport: Swimming
- Strokes: Freestyle
- College team: California Polytechnic State University
- Coach: Phil Wahl (Santa Maria High); Dick Anderson (Cal Poly State); Bob Kiphuth (Summers at Yale); Robert Bruce Muir (Olympics)
Medal record
Representing United States
Pan American Games
Bronze medal – third place	1959 Chicago	400m freestyle

Eugene Carl Lenz (April 12, 1937 – October 10, 2005) was an American competition swimmer who competed for California Polytechnic State, and represented the United States at the 1960 Summer Olympics in Rome competing in the men's 400-meter freestyle, where he made the finals, and placed seventh with a time of 4:26.8. After completing a degree in Architectural Engineering from California Poly State in 1960, and serving in the U.S. Navy for a decade, he worked internationally for the Fluor Corporation as a construction engineer, with assignments in the United States, Indonesia, and Saudia Arabia.

== Early life and family ==
Gene Lenz was born April 12, 1937 in San Luis Obispo, California one of three siblings to Adolph and Maria Lenz though he grew up in nearby Santa Maria. Lenz's father Adolph worked in the oil industry and his mother Maria taught elementary school for a period at Santa Maria's Miller Street Elementary School where Lenz attended. At an early age, his sister Nadene taught him to swim. From a very early age, Lenz lived in Santa Maria on Haslam Drive where he attended Santa Maria's El Camino Junior High and Santa Maria High School, graduating in 1955. Though he would travel extensively in his life, when in California, Lenz would live within fifty miles or less of his hometown Santa Maria. He, Nadene, and his brother Leonard each attended Santa Maria High. In March, 1950, with early height Lenz briefly played for a local basketball league, but by eighth grade, around age 14, Gene began swimming for the team at the pool in Santa Maria, with one of his first meets later as a High School Freshman against the Cal Poly San Luis Obispo Junior Varsity team. Lenz swam for four years representing the Santa Maria High Saints under Coach Phil Wahl, who identified his potential as a competitive swimmer at an early age.

== Cal Poly San Luis Obispo ==
Enrolling on a work scholarship, Lenz attended Cal Poly San Luis Obispo, a state university also known as California Polytechnic State University, San Luis Obispo where he competed in swimming from 1956-1959. At Cal Poly, Lenz swam for Head Coach Dick Anderson, and became the school's inaugural recipient of All-American honors. Anderson, a Cal Poly Hall of Fame inductee, coached the swim team from 1947-1983, where he mentored 40 All Americans, though Lenz was his only Olympian.

=== Training at Yale ===
During his summers at Cal Poly, Cal Poly swim coach Dick Anderson arranged for Lenz to practice at Yale University under their Hall of Fame Head Coach Robert J. H. Kiphuth. In 1959, during his Senior year at Cal Poly, Lenz qualified to swim with the National team in Japan, competing in Tokyo, Osaka, Hiroshima and Nagasaki.

During his collegiate years at Cal Poly, he was a high achieving competitor in the swimming championships for the California State Colleges, earning titles in three events for four successive years, and establishing 14 records in individual events. Lenz led San Luis Obispo to the team championship winning the 100-yard breaststroke with a time of 1:12.0, and the 100-yard butterfly with a time of 1:05 at the Central Coast Swimming Meet on August 17-18, 1957 at San Luis Obispo. Hall of Fame swimmer Peter J. Cutino, a San Luis Obispo team captain, served as a meet organizer and teammate with Lenz. In addition to earning All American honors in 1957, Lenz received them again in 1958, and 1959, and was an NCAA Division I National championship competitor in the same years.

In 1959, Lenz set a new California State collegiate record for the 220-yard freestyle of 2:08.7, set a 440-yard freestyle record of 4:33.9, and a record of 18:34 in the 1500-meter freestyle.

Lenz graduated Cal Poly in 1960 with a degree in Architectural Engineering which he would use extensively in his future career in construction management.

=== 1959 PanAms ===
In international competition, Lenz participated in the 1959 Pan American Games in Chicago. In the 400 metres freestyle, a signature event, he won the bronze medal, helping him to establish his berth on the 1960 Olympic team.

== 1960 Rome Olympics ==
At the late August 1960 Rome Olympics at the age of 23, Lenz competed in the men's 400-meter freestyle, advanced to the finals, and finished seventh overall with a time of 4:26.8. At the Rome Olympics, Lenz was managed by U.S. men's head Olympic coach Robert "Bob" Bruce Muir, a long serving swim Coach of Williams College. American swimmer Murray Rose, favored as the defending Olympic champion, took the gold medal with a time of 4:18.3, Tsuyoshi Yamanaka of Japan,took the silver with a time of 4:21.4, and former world record holder John Konrads of Australia, with a close third place finish, took the bronze with a time of 4:21.8. After the Olympics, Lenz toured Italy with the Olympic team, and played some water polo.

In 1960, Lenz coached the San Luis Swim Club for a period, a competitive program that met around four days a week.

Not long after graduating Cal Poly, Lenz served in the U.S. Navy for ten years, completing three stints in Viet Nam in the late 1960's.

=== Careers ===
In 1972, Lenz started working for the Fluor Corporation in construction management, his primary career. As international in his construction career as he was in his swimming career, Lenz worked in the United States, Indonesia, and Saudi Arabia where he built plants for the petrochemical industry for around five years. After retiring from his position in construction management, he worked as a stockbroker part-time at Maguire Investments in his hometown of Santa Maria, California, just South of San Luis Obispo where he was born and went to college.

=== Marriage ===
Around the age of 43, Lenz married Ethel Amelia Simonfy around 1980, in what was likely a second marriage. A schoolteacher by trade like his mother, Lenz's wife Ethel taught and was a counselor at Santa Maria's Fesler Junior High School for two decades beginning around the late 1950's, and retiring in the late 1970's. Though she was born and completed college in Montana, she received a Masters in Education from Lenz's alma mater Cal Poly, and the couple lived together when Lenz worked in Indonesia in the 1980's. Ethel Lenz was a stepmother to Gene's two children. She died on February 8, 2023 in Arroyo, California, where Gene had last resided.

Gene Lenz died at the age of 68 on October 10, 2005 in Arroyo Grande, outside San Luis Obispo, California. On October 18, 2005, an afternoon service was held at 401 South Lincoln Street, at St. Peter's Episcopal Church, in Santa Maria, California. In his retirement, Lenz had continued to contribute to Cal Poly San Luis Obispo swimming, was involved in attaching the name of his coach to the Anderson Aquatic Center, and in setting up a swimming and diving scholarship. Having lived in nearby Arryo Grande since 1984, he was survived by his wife Ethel, two sons and three grandchildren.

=== Honors ===
Lenz was inducted into the Cal Poly Obispo Hall of Fame in 1987 for his collegiate swimming achievements. In May, 1959, he was awarded the Oscar Van Horn Memorial Trophy given to the top Cal Poly Athlete of the Year, as only the second swimmer to receive the trophy since its inception in 1940.

== See also ==
- List of Cal Poly at San Luis Obispo alumni
