= Luis Jiménez (sport shooter) =

Mexican sports shooter

Personal information
- Full name: Luis Jiménez Peña
- Born: 4 June 1924 Guadalajara, Mexico

Sport
- Sport: Sports shooting

Luis Jiménez (born 4 June 1924) is a Mexican former sports shooter. He competed in the 25 metre pistol event at the 1960 Summer Olympics.
