= Veiko Siimar =

Estonian swimmer

Personal information
- Nationality: Estonian
- Born: 6 December 1941 (age 84) Tartu, Estonia

Sport
- Sport: Swimming

Veiko Siimar (born 6 December 1941) is an Estonian swimmer. He competed in the men's 100 metre backstroke at the 1960 Summer Olympics for the Soviet Union.
