= Eulalia Martínez =

Mexican swimmer (born 1939)

Personal information
- Born: 22 April 1939 (age 87) Mexico City, Mexico

Sport
- Sport: Swimming
Medal record
Representing Mexico
Pan American Games
Bronze medal – third place	1959 Chicago	4x100m medley relay
Central American and Caribbean Games
Gold medal – first place	1959 Caracas	100m butterfly

Eulalia Martínez (born 22 April 1939) is a Mexican former swimmer. She competed in two events at the 1960 Summer Olympics.
