= Pedro Diz =

Argentine swimmer

Personal information
- Born: 15 July 1944 (age 82) Santa Fe, Argentina

Sport
- Sport: Swimming

Pedro Diz (born 15 July 1944) is an Argentine former swimmer who specialised in backstroke. He represented Argentina at the 1960 Summer Olympics held in Rome and again at the 1964 Summer Olympics in Tokyo.

During the 1960 Olympics, Diz competed in the 100 m backstroke event; he advanced past the first round with a time of about 1:04.7, but did not reach the final.

In the 1964 Games, he took part in the 200 m backstroke, finishing his heat in approximately 2:24.9, though again without advancing to the medal rounds.
