= Robert Chenaux =

Puerto Rican swimmer (born 1943)

Personal information
- Nationality: Puerto Rican
- Born: 29 November 1943 (age 82) Hato Rey, Puerto Rico

Sport
- Sport: Swimming

Robert Chenaux (born 29 November 1943) is a Puerto Rican former swimmer. He competed in the men's 400 metre freestyle at the 1960 Summer Olympics.
