= Saroch Silpikul =

Thai sports shooter (born 1928)

Personal information
- Born: 27 December 1928 Bangkok, Thailand

Sport
- Sport: Sports shooting

Saroch Silpikul (born 27 December 1928) is a Thai former sports shooter. He competed in the 50 metre rifle, three positions and 50 metre rifle, prone events at the 1960 Summer Olympics.
