= Mauricio Mata =

Mexican cyclist (1939–2020)

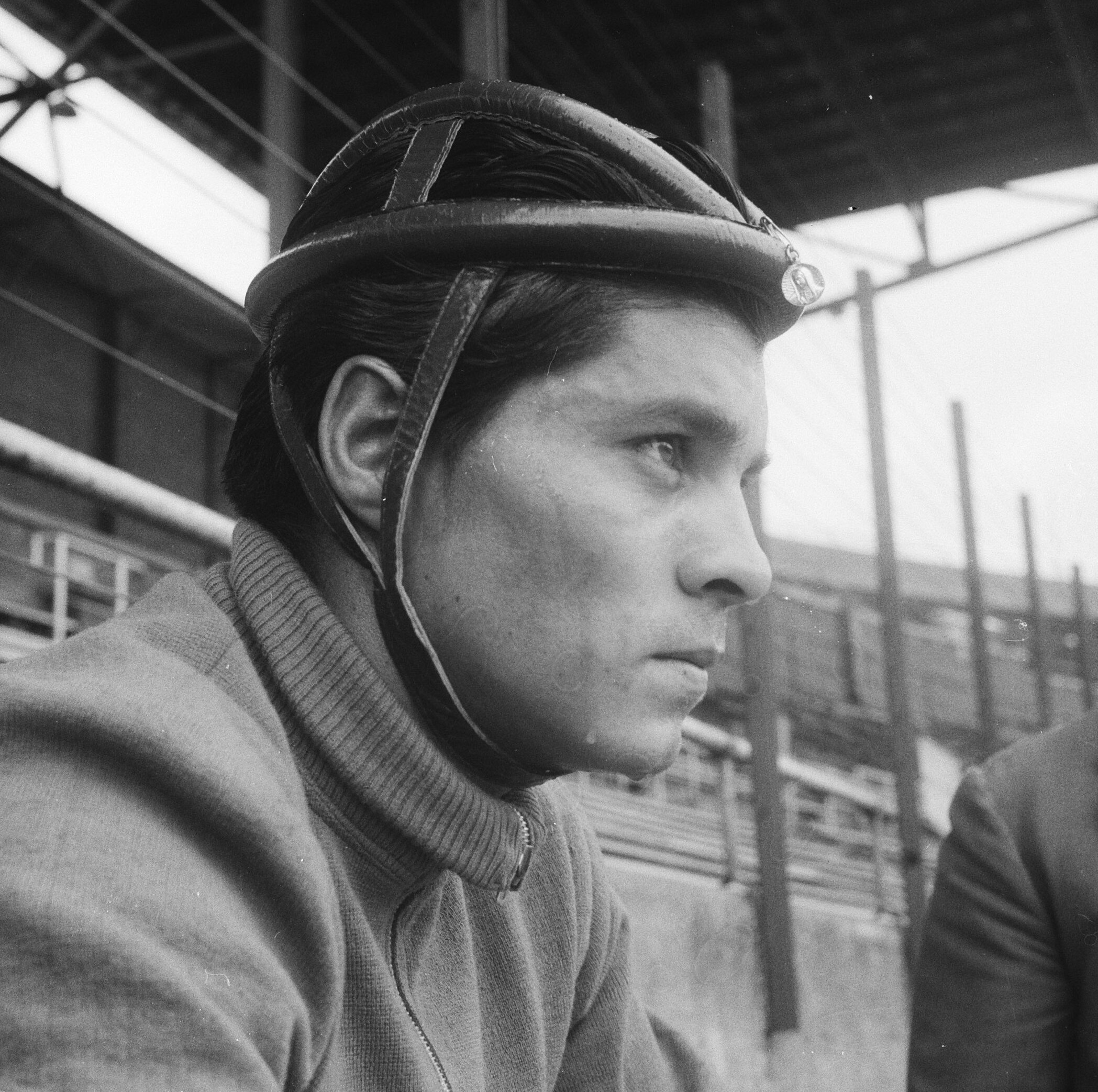
- Mata Lara in 1959

Personal information
- Full name: Mauricio Mata Lara
- Born: 12 April 1939 San Luis Potosí, Mexico
- Died: 15 October 2020 (aged 81) Aguascalientes, Mexico

Cycling career
- Sport: Cycling

Mauricio Mata Lara (12 April 1939 – 15 October 2020) was a Mexican cyclist. He competed in three events at the 1960 Summer Olympics.
