= Swimming at the 1959 Pan American Games – Men's 4 × 200 metre freestyle relay =

Men's 4 × 200 metre freestyle relay at the I959 Pan American Games
- Venue: -
- Dates: September 1 (preliminaries), September 6 (finals)

Medalists
Gold medal	Dick Blick, Peter Sintz, John Rounsavelle, Frank Winters	United States
Silver medal	-	Mexico
Bronze medal	-	Canada

The men's 4 × 200 metre freestyle relay competition of the swimming events at the 1959 Pan American Games took place on 1 September (preliminaries) and 6 September (finals). The defending Pan American Games champion is the United States.

This race consisted of sixteen lengths of the pool. Each of the four swimmers completed four lengths of the pool. The first swimmer had to touch the wall before the second could leave the starting block.

== Results ==
All times are in minutes and seconds.

KEY:	q	Fastest non-qualifiers	Q	Qualified	GR	Games record	NR	National record	PB	Personal best	SB	Seasonal best

=== Heats ===
The first round was held on September 1.

Rank	Heat	Name	Nationality	Time	Notes
1	2	- - - -	United States	8:33.4	Q, GR
2	1	- - - -	Mexico	8:53.7	Q
3	1	- - - -	Canada	9:02.1	Q
4	2	- - - -	Peru	9:12.2	Q
5	1	- - - -	Brazil	9:15.3	Q
6	2	- - - -	Argentina	9:27.4	Q
7	2	- - - -	Cuba	9:32.8	Q
8	1	- - - -	El Salvador	9:44.3	Q

=== Final ===
The final was held on September 6.

Rank	Name	Nationality	Time	Notes
1st place, gold medalist(s)	Dick Blick; Peter Sintz; John Rounsavelle; Frank Winters	United States	8:22.7	GR
2nd place, silver medalist(s)	- - - -	Mexico	8:56.4	
3rd place, bronze medalist(s)	- - - -	Canada	9:00.4	
4	Moacir dos Santos; Francisco Carioba; Aldo Perseke; Sídnei Gavioli	Brazil	9:01.9	
5	- - - -	Peru	9:11.3	
6	- - - -	Argentina	9:12.6	
7	- - - -	-	-	
8	- - - -	-	-	
