= Bob Wheaton =

Canadian swimmer

Personal information
- Full name: Robert John Wheaton
- Nationality: Canadian
- Born: 28 December 1941 (age 84) Victoria, British Columbia, Canada
- Education: University of Victoria; University of British Columbia; Simon Fraser University
- Occupations: Construction, Real Estate
- Height: 185 cm (6 ft 1 in)
- Weight: 72 kg (159 lb)
- Spouse: Julie Grace Banfield

Sport
- Sport: Swimming
- Strokes: Backstroke; Individual Medley
- Club: Victoria YMCA
- Coach: Archie McKinnon (Vic YMCA)
Medal record
Representing Canada
British Empire and Commonwealth Games
Silver medal – second place	1958 Cardiff	4×110yd medley relay
Bronze medal – third place	1958 Cardiff	110yd backstroke
Pan American Games
Silver medal – second place	1959 Chicago	4×100m medley relay

Robert John "Bob" Wheaton (born 28 December 1941) is a Canadian former backstroke swimmer and Canadian record holder. He represented Canada at the 1960 Rome Olympics where he competed in the 100-meter backstroke and swam the leadoff backstroke leg in the 4×100 meter medley. In his short swimming career, he set over 30 Canadian backstroke, butterfly, medley and relay event swimming records. He would later attend the Universities of Victoria and British Columbia, and work in the fields of construction and real estate.

== Early life and swimming ==
Robert Wheaton was born 28 December 1941, in Victoria, British Columbia to Mrs. and Mr. George Henry Wheaton, owner of a Real Estate company and resident of Victoria's Satellite Street. Robert attended Junior High at Glenlyon Preparatory School from 1950 to 1955, and subsequently attended Victoria's Oak Bay High School, for 10th-12th grade from 1956-1959, graduating in 1959. From the age of thirteen in 1954 and continuing through 1957, he trained and competed with the Victoria YMCA on Blanchard Street, swimming often in the Crystal Garden Pool or the YMCA pool where he was trained and mentored by accomplished Canadian Coach Archie McKinnon. Victoria's Crystal Garden featured a 150 foot pool with a large glass roof. McKinnon coached at the Victoria YMCA from 1930-1960, coached Canadian athletes at four Olympics, and became a member of both the Canadian Sports Hall of Fame and the British Columbia Sports Hall of Fame. Wheaton also swam for the Oak Bay High team, under Coach Gary Taylor which held practices at the Crystal Garden Pool, though his training centered more on the Victoria YMCA team. In 1957, he brought local attention to his swimming career when he set the Junior Canadian record in the 50-yard backstroke with a time of 27.2 seconds, and set a second Canadian record in the 100-yard backstroke with a time of 1:02.2.

=== Oak Bay High swimming ===
In late October, 1958, Wheaton represented Oak Bay High, winning the 50-yard backstroke at the Senior Inter-High Gala at Victoria's Crystal Garden Pool. Wheaton's Oak Bay High team won the meet by a large margin against Victoria and Douglas High in their eighth straight victory in the annual meet. On 22 November 1958, Wheaton's Oak Bay High won the British Columbia Senior High School Swimming Championship at Victoria's Crystal Garden Pool with Wheaton winning the 50-yard backstroke with a time of 26.3, making Wheaton a provincial champion.

== International competition highlights ==
In international competition, in the 1958 British Empire and Commonwealth Games in Cardiff, Wales, Wheaton's Canadian team placed second winning the silver medal in the 4×110 yards Medley Relay where he swam with George Park, Kenneth Williams, and the non-Olympian Peter Bell. Wheaton captured a bronze in the same games in the 110 yard backstroke in 1:06.5. The winner in the 110 yard backstroke was rival Australian backstroker John Monckton who covered the distance in 1:01.7, and was the holder of the 110-yard backstroke world record of 1:01.5.

Wheaton's Canadian team placed 2nd in the 1959 Pan American Games in Chicago, Illinois in the 4×100 metres medley relay where Wheaton swam the leadoff backstroke leg with teammates Steve Rabinovitch, Cam Grout, and the non-Olympian Peter Fowler.

Swimming with the Canadian team in late 1958, Wheaton did a tour of Germany, where he competed in meets in Hamburg, Gottinghen, Hanover, and Beyreuth. He swam the 100 meter backstroke in a Canadian record time of 1:04.6 at a meet in Beyreuth. The intent of the trip was to encourage German teams to swim in Canadian meets and increase the level of competition, as well as to eventually build greater public interest in swimming in Canada. At the time, Canada had only two olympic-sized pools.

== 1960 Rome Olympics ==
At the mid-July 1960 Canadian Olympic swimming trials in Winnipeg, Wheaton swam the 200 meter backstroke in a Canadian record time of 2:26.6, and the 100-meter backstroke in a Canadian record time of 1:04.3, winning a berth with the Canadian Olympic team.

Wheaton represented Canada at the late August-September 1960 Summer Olympics in Rome. He placed 17th in the 100 meter backstroke with a time of 1:05.7. Wheaton placed a close 4th swimming in the 4×100-meter medley relay, where his four-man Canadian team recorded a combined time of 4:16.8, making the finals. He swam the leadoff backstroke leg with the team of Steve Rabinovitch, Vancouver native Cam Grout and Dick Pound.

== Education and career ==
Wheaton decided not to pursue a career in swimming after high school and the 1960 Olympics, and retired from competition around 1960. He studied at the University of Victoria, the University of British Columbia in Vancouver and Simon Fraser University in Vancouver. Though the Universities he attended had strong swimming programs, he chose to focus on academics rather than continue to compete in collegiate swimming. His professional focus after college included careers in business, construction and real estate. He would serve as President and Director of G. H. Wheaton Ltd., primarily a real estate company, and also owned Wheaton Construction Ltd. He participated in the community of Victoria as a president, chairperson, and director of several local organizations, and served as a board member, supporter and parent with Victoria's Glenylon Norfolk School, formerly known as Glenylon Preparatory School when he attended.

=== Marriage ===
Robert Wheaton married Julie Grace Banfield, daughter of Arthur Lloyd Banfield of Victoria, on the evening of Thursday, 24 August 1967 at Victoria's Church of Our Lord. The couple planned to reside in Victoria.

=== Honors ===
Wheaton was recognized as Victoria's top athlete in 1959, and presented with the Sid Thomas Memorial award. He was inducted into the Greater Victoria Sports Hall of Fame in 2003. As a former competitor for Oak Bay High and a 1959 graduate, he is also a member of the Oak Bay High School Hall of Fame.
