= Sumol Sumontame =

Thai sports shooter

Personal information
- Born: 17 August 1932 (age 93) Bangkok, Thailand

Sport
- Sport: Sports shooting

Sumol Sumontame (born 17 August 1932) is a Thai former sports shooter. He competed at the 1960 Summer Olympics and the 1964 Summer Olympics.
