= Athos de Oliveira =

Brazilian swimmer (born 1943)

Personal information
- Full name: Athos Procópio de Oliveira Filho
- Born: 3 January 1943 (age 83) Catanduva, São Paulo, Brazil
- Height: 1.86 m (6 ft 1 in)

Sport
- Sport: Swimming
- Strokes: Freestyle, Backstroke
Medal record
Pan American Games
Bronze medal – third place	1963 São Paulo	100 m backstroke
Bronze medal – third place	1963 São Paulo	4x200 m freestyle

Athos Procópio de Oliveira Filho (born 3 January 1943) is a former international freestyle and backstroke swimmer from Brazil.

At the 1959 Pan American Games in Chicago, he finished 7th in the 100 metre backstroke. He also swam the 4 × 100-metre medley.

At the 1960 Summer Olympics, in Rome, he swam the 100-metre backstroke and the 4×100-metre medley, not reaching the finals.

At the 1963 Pan American Games, in São Paulo, he won two bronze medals in the 100-metre backstroke, and in the 4×200-metre freestyle.

At the 1964 Summer Olympics, in Tokyo, he swam the 100-metre freestyle and the 4×100-metre medley, not reaching the finals.

Among other achievements, he was part of the Brazilian team champion of the 4×100-metre freestyle relay in the 1964 South American Absolute Championship, in Guayaquil, Ecuador. Team composed of Alvaro Pires, Athos Procópio de Oliveira, Paulo Salles Cunha, and Antonio Celso Guimarães.
