= Jacinto Brito =

Mexican cyclist (1938–1968)

Personal information
- Full name: Jacinto Brito Villegas
- Born: 9 April 1938 Mexico City, Mexico
- Died: 1 September 1968 (aged 30) Mexico City, Mexico

Cycling career
- Sport: Cycling

Jacinto Brito Villegas (9 April 1938 – 1 September 1968) was a Mexican cyclist. He competed in the individual road race and team pursuit events at the 1960 Summer Olympics.
