= Chuck Bittick =

American water polo player (1939–2005)

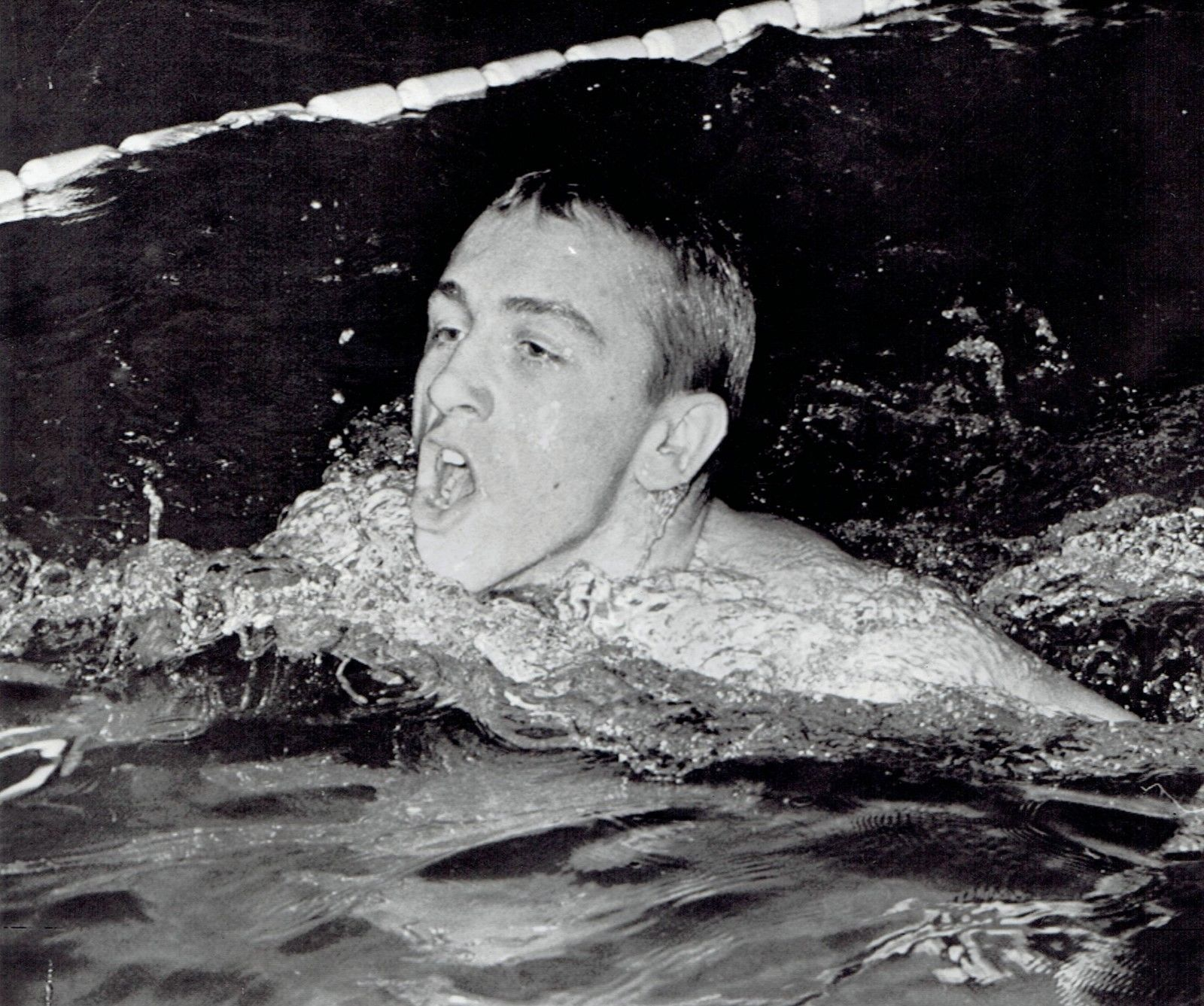
- Bittick in 1961

Personal information
- Full name: Charles Greene Bittick Jr.
- National team: United States
- Born: November 2, 1939 El Reno, Oklahoma, U.S.
- Died: April 28, 2005 (aged 65) Yorba Linda, California, U.S.
- Occupation: Insurance Broker
- Height: 1.88 m (6 ft 2 in)
- Weight: 88 kg (194 lb)
- Spouse: Barbara Ellen Wilson

Sport
- Sport: Swimming, water polo
- College team: University of Southern California
- Club: Los Angeles Swim Stadium WP; Lynwood Swim Club
- Coached by: Peter Daland (USC); Neal Kohlhase LA Swim Stadium; Neal Kohlhase ('60 Olympics)
Medal record
Representing the United States
Pan American Games
Silver medal – second place	1959 Chicago	100 m backstroke
Silver medal – second place	1963 São Paulo	100 m backstroke
Silver medal – second place	1963 São Paulo	Water polo
Representing USC
NCAA
Gold medal – first place	1960 University Park	Team title
Gold medal – first place	1960 University Park	100 yard backstroke
Gold medal – first place	1960 University Park	200 yard backstroke

Charles Greene Bittick Jr. (November 2, 1939 – April 28, 2005) was an American water polo player and swimmer who competed for the University of Southern California, and participated in water polo at the 1960 Rome Olympics. He later worked as an insurance broker, and engaged in recreational sports including mountain climbing and long distance kayaking.

Bittick was born November 2, 1939 in El Reno, Oklahoma to Charles G. Bittick Sr., and Lora Na-Deanne Hardin. After a family move, he attended Woodrow Wilson High School in Long Beach, California.

== University of Southern California ==
After graduating high school, Bittick attended Long Beach City College and the University of Southern California where he swam under Head Coach Peter Daland and played water polo. Bittick majored in telecommunications at USC, was in Kappa Alpha Fraternity and the honorary Skull and Daggar. During his collegiate career at USC, in 1960 and 1961, he received honors as an NCAA champion in both the 110 yd and 200 yd Backstroke events. Widely acclaimed as a swimmer at USC, in 1959, 1960 and 1961, he earned All-Pacific-8 Conference honors, and in 1960, was a most Outstanding swimmer of the Year. In 1961, he captained the USC swim team, and was that year's University's Swimmer of the Year.

After college, he enrolled in the U.S. Navy achieving the officer rank of Lieutenant by 1965.

== 1960 Olympic Trials ==
At the 1960 water polo trials in Los Angeles, Bittick played for the Los Angeles Stadium Club team, who defeated several teams and went undefeated to gain their Olympic berth to the 1960 Rome Olympics. Bittick was high scorer in the game against El Segundo Swim Club, scoring 2 of 3 goals, in a 3–2 victory over El Segundo. Outstanding in Olympic trials competition, he was high scorer in every game up to the match with El Segundo.

== 1960 Rome Olympics ==
Bittick participated as a member of the American water polo team that finished seventh among sixteen competing countries at the 1960 Summer Olympics in the men's water polo tournament. He played five matches and scored three goals. The US team played under Olympic Coaches Neal Kohlhase and Urho Saari, both inductees of the USA Water Polo Hall of Fame. Though the American team had a disappointing 7–2 loss to pre-Olympic favorite Hungary in early rounds, they defeated the team from France with a score of 10-4. Helping to advance the team to the semi-finals, the U.S. defeated the strong team from Belgium in a quarterfinal round in a 5–0 shutout. Though making it to the semi-finals, they lost a late round match to the traditionally dominant team from Yugoslavia, 6–2 on August 31, ending their chances of contending for a medal. At the completion of the tournament, the team from Italy won the gold, Russia took the silver, and perennial favorite Hungary took the bronze.

=== Records ===
In 1960, Bittick briefly held the world record in the 200 m backstroke, and in 1961 won the 400 yd medley event at the AAU championships, setting a new national record.

In non-Olympic international competition, he won three silver medals, two in the 100 m backstroke and one in water polo, at the Pan American Games between 1959 and 1963.

=== Marriages ===
In 1959, Bittick married Royalyn Kay Tice Robbins though the marriage only lasted around five years. On August 28, 1965, he married Barbara Ellen Wilson of Indianapolis, at the First Congregational Church in Indianapolis. Bittick remained married to Barbara for the remainder of his life. The couple initially planned to live in Long Beach, California.

=== Careers and avocations ===
After retiring from competitions, he relocated to Yorba Linda, California, where he worked as a broker for Farmer's Insurance. He remained active in challenging recreational sports, and in 1997 successfully ascended Mount Rainier, South of Seattle, Washington. Continuing his career as an adventurer, while travelling by kayak he and his brother crossed the Sea of Cortés in around nine days.

Bittick died April 28 at the age of 65, in Yorba Linda, California of colon cancer, and was buried at Westminster Memorial Park in Westminster. Memorial Services were held May 4, at the Yorba Linda Friends Church. Bittick was survived by wife Barbara Wilson Bittick, two sons, a daughter and grandchildren.

=== Honors ===
In 1979, he was inducted into the USA Water Polo Hall of Fame.
