= Alejandro Gaxiola =

Mexican swimmer (born 1939)

Personal information
- Born: 15 January 1939 (age 87) Mexico City, Mexico

Sport
- Sport: Swimming
Medal record
Representing Mexico
Pan American Games
Bronze medal – third place	1959 Chicago	4x100m medley relay

Alejandro Gaxiola (born 15 January 1939) is a Mexican former swimmer. He competed in two events at the 1960 Summer Olympics.
