= Luis Zárate (cyclist) =

Mexican cyclist (1940–2020)

Personal information
- Born: 25 November 1940 Morelia, Mexico
- Died: 7 September 2020 (aged 79)

Cycling career
- Sport: Cycling

Luis Zárate (25 November 1940 – 7 September 2020) was a Mexican cyclist. He competed in the individual road race and team time trial events at the 1960 Summer Olympics.
