= Jorge Escalante =

Mexican former swimmer and business man

Personal information
- Full name: Jorge Escalante Larrauri
- Born: July 20, 1940 Mexico City, Mexico
- Died: June 11, 2007 (aged 66)
- Height: 1.82 m (6 ft 0 in)
- Weight: 71 kg (157 lb)

Sport
- Sport: Swimming
- Strokes: Freestyle
Medal record
Men's swimming
Representing Mexico
Pan American Games
Silver medal – second place	1959 Chicago	4x200 m freestyle
Bronze medal – third place	1959 Chicago	4x100 m medley

Jorge Escalante (20 July 1940 – 11 June 2007) was a Mexican swimmer and business man who competed in the 1960 Summer Olympics.
