= Enrique Rabell =

Mexican swimmer (born 1941)

Personal information
- Born: January 31, 1941 (age 85) Querétaro, Querétaro, Mexico

Sport
- Sport: Swimming
Medal record
Representing Mexico
Central American and Caribbean Games
Gold medal – first place	1962 Kingston	100m backstroke
Gold medal – first place	1962 Kingston	4x100m medley relay

Enrique Rabell (born 31 January 1941) is a Mexican former swimmer who competed in the 1960 Summer Olympics.
