= George Breen =

American swimmer (1935–2019)

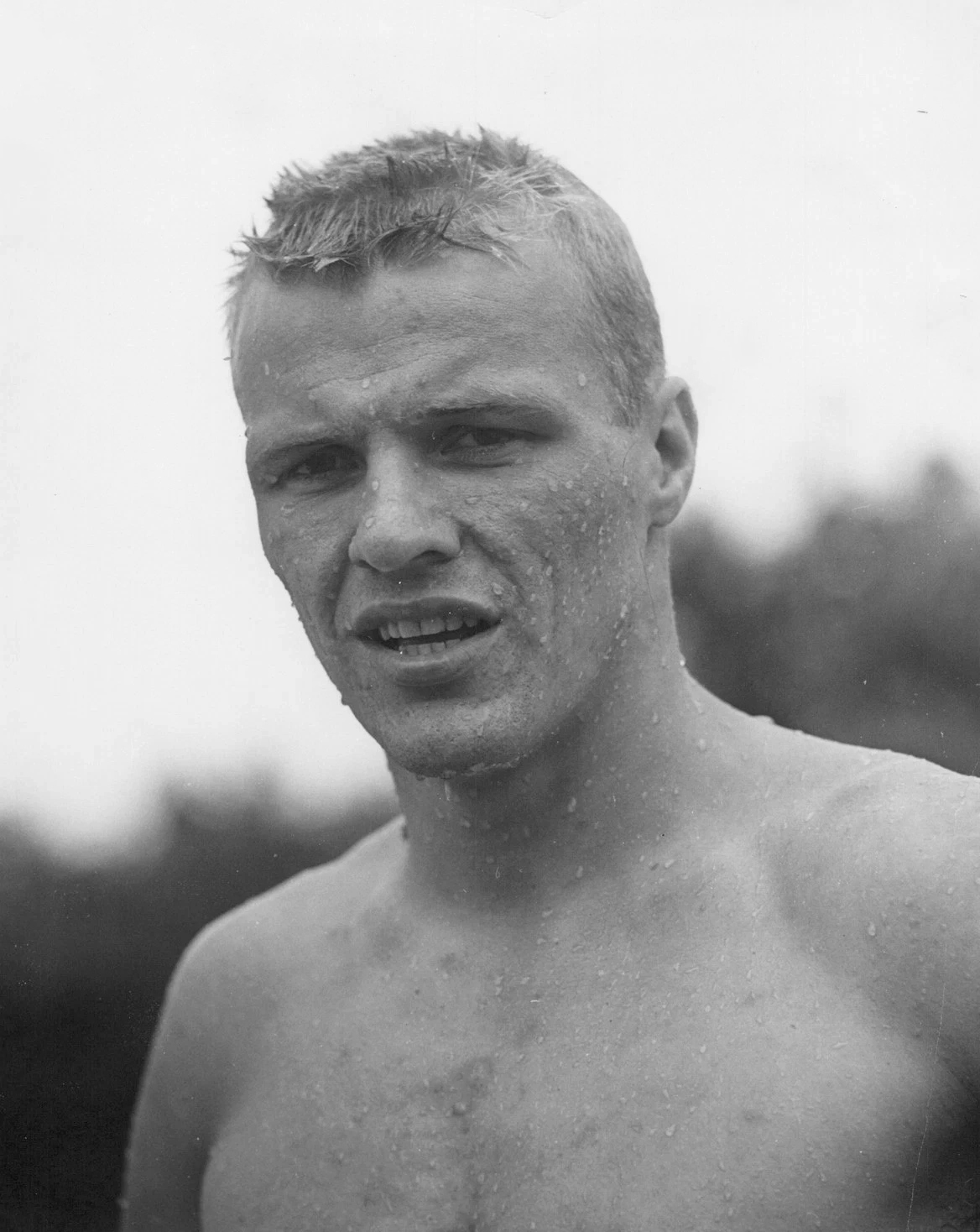

Personal information
- Full name: George Thomas Breen
- National team: United States
- Born: July 19, 1935 Buffalo, New York, U.S.
- Died: November 9, 2019 (aged 84) Washington Township, New Jersey, U.S.
- Occupations: Swim Coach; U of Pennsylvania 1966–1982
- Height: 6 ft 0 in (1.83 m)
- Weight: 183 lb (83 kg)

Sport
- Sport: Swimming
- Strokes: Freestyle
- Club: Indianapolis Athletic Club
- College team: Cortland State U. (CSU)
- Coach: James Counsilman (CSU)
Medal record
Men's swimming
Representing the United States
Olympic Games
Silver medal – second place	1956 Melbourne	4×200 m freestyle
Bronze medal – third place	1956 Melbourne	400 m freestyle
Bronze medal – third place	1956 Melbourne	1500 m freestyle
Bronze medal – third place	1960 Rome	1500 m freestyle
Pan American Games
Gold medal – first place	1959 Chicago	400 m freestyle
Silver medal – second place	1959 Chicago	1500 m freestyle
Representing Cortland State
NCAA
Gold medal – first place	1956 Ann Arbor	1,500 meter freestyle

George Thomas Breen (July 19, 1935 – November 9, 2019) was an American Hall of Fame competition swimmer, four-time Olympic medalist in freestyle events, and world record-holder in three events. After retiring as a swimmer, he worked as a swim coach at the University of Pennsylvania in 1966–1982 and later the Jersey Wahoos Swim Club.

== Early life ==
Breen was born in Buffalo, New York. He was a champion rower for Bishop Timon High School in Buffalo, and the West Side Rowing Club.

=== Cortland State ===
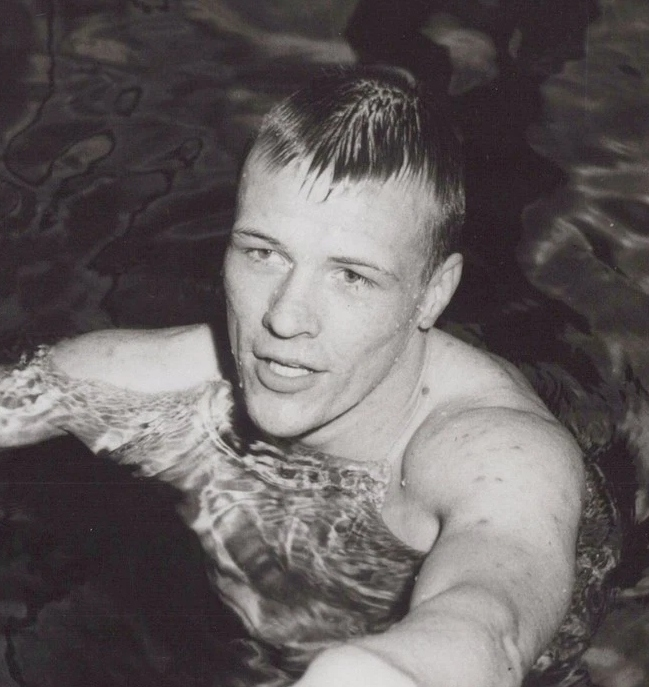
Breen in 1956

Breen attended Cortland State University, then known as Cortland State Teachers College, where he swam for Hall of Fame Coach James "Doc" Counsilman, from around 1952–1956. On May 15, 1956, as a college Senior, he won his signature event, the 1500 meter freestyle at the Eastern Intercollegiate Swimming Championships at Cornell's Teagle Hall Pool in a time of 17:44.5. He completed the swim 140 yards ahead of the second place competitor. The event was held in a 25-yard pool. His time in the event, the whe he had won it the prior year was a 19:00.4. Breen was an All American three times while at Cortland State, and won All American honors with the American Athletic Union as well. During Counsilman's tenure as coach at Cortland State in 1952–1957, which included Breen's time as a competitor, the swim team had a noteworthy record of 35–5 in dual meets.

=== 1500-meter world record ===
According to EBSCO his breakthrough moment, and greatest single effort, was his 1500-meter Long Course World Record of 18:05.9 at the May 3, 1956 U.S. AAU Indoor Championship at Yale, referred to by Ohio State Coach Mike Peppe as “the single most brilliant effort in swimming since I’ve been coaching.” Breen reduced the standing world record by 13.1 seconds, and completed his swim a full 1:18, ahead of the second-place finisher, Frank Brunell, who had been an American National Champion many times. No prior swimmer had ever completed an event so far ahead of the second-place finisher in the history of the U.S. Nationals.

== World competitor ==
=== Olympics ===
Breen represented the United States at the November 1956 Summer Olympics in Melbourne, Australia where he was managed by U.S. Head Olympic Coach Robert "Bob" Bruce Muir, a long serving swim Coach of Williams College. As a member of the second-place U.S. team in the men's 4×200-meter freestyle relay, Breen earned a silver medal, together with Dick Hanley, Bill Woolsey and Ford Konno. He also took bronze medals in the 400-meter freestyle (4:32.5) and men's 1,500-meter freestyle (18:08.2) – after setting a new world record of 17:52.9 in the qualifying heats of the 1,500.

=== Pan American Games ===
At the 1959 Pan American Games, he won a gold medal for his first-place finish in the 400-meter freestyle and a silver as the runner-up in the 1500-meter freestyle. He was elected team captain of the U.S. men for the 1960 Summer Olympics in Rome, and earned another bronze medal while competing in the men's 1,500-meter freestyle (17:55.9).

== Coaching ==
From 1960 to 1962, Breen coached swimming for Indianapolis's Riviera Club. In 1962–1965, he relocated to the Northeast and served as the boy's swim coach at the Vespar Boat Club, a very strong program in Philadelphia. Breen coached the Penn Quakers men's swimming team at Philadelphia's University of Pennsylvania from 1966 until 1982, and served as a coach for U.S. Swimming. He formerly coached the Gloucester County Institute of Technology (Deptford, New Jersey) swim team, currently known as the Greater Philadelphia Aquatic Club, and at the Jersey Wahoos Swim Club in Mount Laurel, New Jersey.

== Swimming community ==
Breen was active in swimming administration, and chaired the USA Swimming Olympic International Operations Committee. He was a member of Middle Atlantic Swimming’s Board of Directors, and also served on the Board of Directors of USA Swimming.

Breen was inducted into the International Swim Hall of Fame, the American Coaches Association Hall of Fame, and the Cortland State Hall of Fame.

== Later life and death ==
Breen was a resident of Washington Township, Gloucester County, New Jersey, where he coached local high school and club swim teams into his 70s. He was diagnosed with bone cancer of his right middle finger and had to have it amputated. After battling pancreatic cancer for several years, Breen died on November 9, 2019, in New Jersey.

== See also ==
- List of Olympic medalists in swimming (men)
- World record progression 800 metres freestyle
- World record progression 1500 metres freestyle
- World record progression 4 × 200 metres freestyle relay

Records
Preceded by Hironoshin Furuhashi	Men's 1,500-meter freestyle world record-holder (long course); May 3, 1956 – October 30, 1956	Succeeded by Murray Rose
Preceded by Murray Rose	Men's 1,500-meter freestyle world record-holder (long course); December 5, 1956 – February 22, 1958	Succeeded by John Konrads
