= Raúl Guzmán (swimmer) =

Mexican swimmer (born 1940)

Personal information
- Full name: Raúl Guzmán Torres
- Nationality: Mexico
- Born: April 2, 1940 (age 86) Mexico City, Mexico
- Height: 1.72 m (5 ft 8 in)
- Weight: 68 kg (150 lb)

Sport
- Sport: Swimming
- Strokes: Freestyle
Medal record
Men's swimming
Representing Mexico
Pan American Games
Silver medal – second place	1959 Chicago	4x200 m freestyle

Raúl Guzmán (born 2 April 1940) is a Mexican former swimmer who competed in the 1960 Summer Olympics.
