= Alfredo Guzmán =

Mexican swimmer (born 1943)

Personal information
- Full name: Alfredo Guzmán Torres
- Born: February 6, 1943 (age 83) Mexico City, Mexico
- Height: 1.70 m (5 ft 7 in)
- Weight: 67 kg (148 lb)

Sport
- Sport: Swimming
- Strokes: Freestyle
Medal record
Men's swimming
Representing Mexico
Pan American Games
Silver medal – second place	1959 Chicago	4x200 m freestyle

Alfredo Guzmán (born 6 February 1943) is a Mexican former swimmer who competed in the 1960 Summer Olympics and in the 1964 Summer Olympics.
