= Mauricio Ocampo =

Mexican swimmer (born 1941)

Personal information
- Full name: Mauricio Ocampo Esparza
- Born: March 24, 1941 (age 85) Mexico City, Mexico
- Height: 1.68 m (5 ft 6 in)
- Weight: 68 kg (150 lb)

Sport
- Sport: Swimming
- Strokes: Freestyle
Medal record
Men's swimming
Representing Mexico
Pan American Games
Silver medal – second place	1959 Chicago	4x200 m freestyle

Mauricio Ocampo (born 24 March 1941) is a Mexican former freestyle and medley swimmer who competed in the 1960 Summer Olympics.
