= Aquatics at the 1962 British Empire and Commonwealth Games =

- Venue: Beatty Park Aquatic Centre
- Location: Vincent Street, North Perth, Western Australia
- Dates: 22 November – 1 December 1962

Aquatics at the 1962 British Empire and Commonwealth Games made its seventh appearance at the Commonwealth Games, with both Swimming at the Commonwealth Games and Diving at the Commonwealth Games being included again.

There were four diving events and a large increase in swimming events with 23 events contested (up from 15 in 1958).

The Beatty Park Aquatic Centre had been specifically built for the Games.

Australia topped the medal table with 17 gold medals.

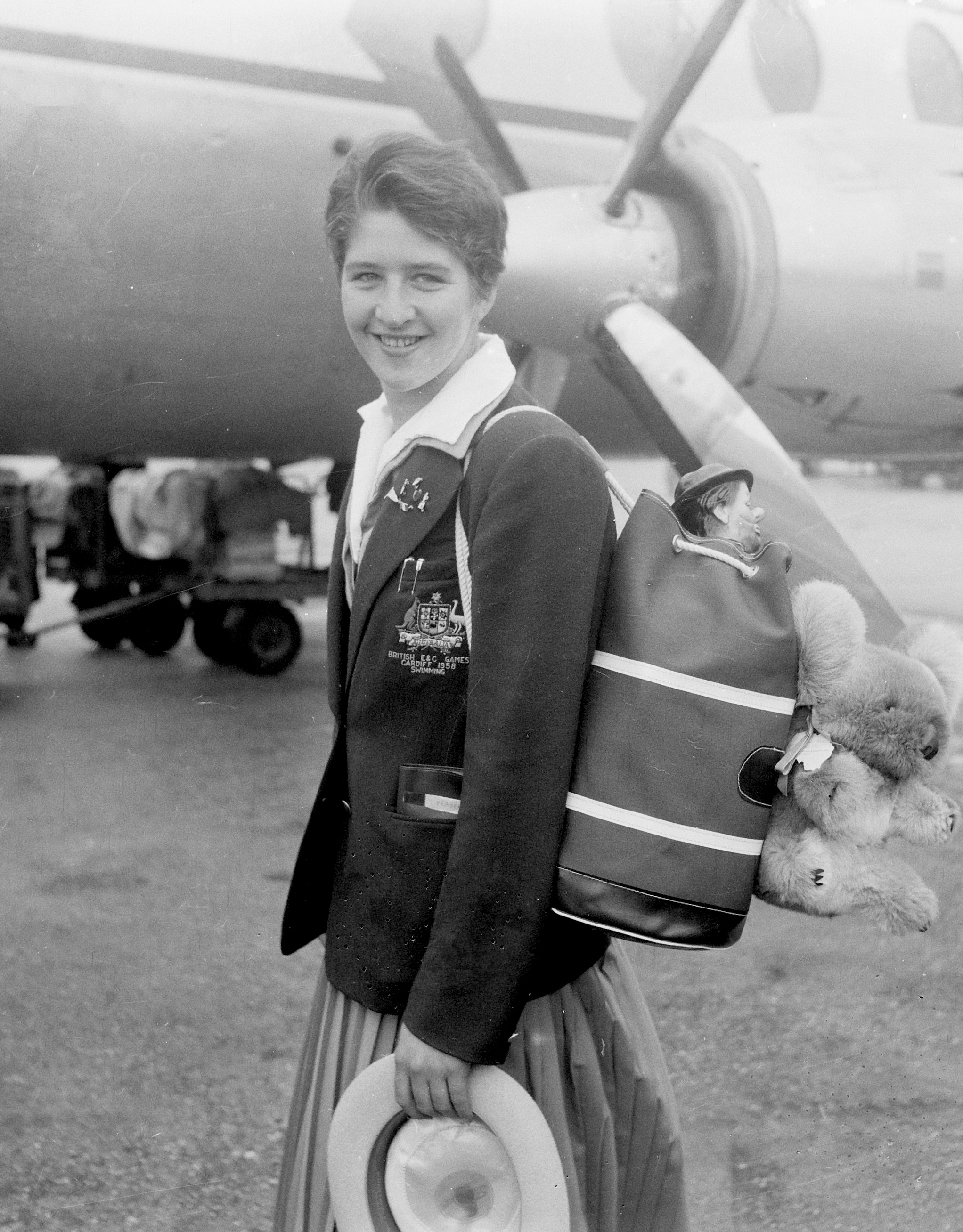
Dawn Fraser was the star of the women's swimming events, winning four gold medals

== Medal table ==
* Host nation (Australia)

Medals won by nation with totals, ranked by number of golds—sortable
Rank	Nation	Gold	Silver	Bronze	Total
1	Australia	17	14	10	41
2	England	8	7	8	23
3	Canada	2	4	7	13
4	New Zealand	0	1	2	3
5	Scotland	0	1	0	1
Totals (5 entries)		27	27	27	81

== Medal winners ==
=== Diving ===
Event	Gold	Silver	Bronze
3m Springboard (m)	Brian Phelps (ENG)	Thomas Dinsley (CAN)	Ernie Meissner (CAN)
10m Platform (m)	Brian Phelps (ENG)	Graham Deuble (AUS)	Tony Kitcher (ENG)
3m Springboard (w)	Susan Knight (AUS)	Liz Ferris (ENG)	Lorraine McArthur (AUS)
10m Platform (w)	Susan Knight (AUS)	Margaret Austen (ENG)	Patricia Plowman (AUS)

=== Swimming ===
Men's events

Event	Gold	Silver	Bronze
110 yd freestyle	Dick Pound (CAN)	Bob McGregor (SCO)	David Dickson (AUS)
440 yd freestyle	Murray Rose (AUS)	Allan Wood (AUS)	Bob Windle (AUS)
1650 yd freestyle	Murray Rose (AUS)	Bob Windle (AUS)	Allan Wood (AUS)
110 yd backstroke	Graham Sykes (ENG)	Julian Carroll (AUS)	Wayne Vincent (AUS)
220 yd backstroke	Julian Carroll (AUS)	Tony Fingleton (AUS)	Alan Robertson (NZL)
110 yd breaststroke	Ian O'Brien (AUS)	William Burton (AUS)	Steve Rabinovitch (CAN)
220 yd breaststroke	Ian O'Brien (AUS)	William Burton (AUS)	Neil Nicholson (ENG)
110 yd butterfly	Kevin Berry (AUS)	Neville Hayes (AUS)	Aldy Meinhardt (CAN)
220 yd butterfly	Kevin Berry (AUS)	Neville Hayes (AUS)	Brett Hill (AUS)
440 yd individual medley	Alex Alexander (AUS)	John Oravainen (AUS)	Jack Kelso (CAN)
4×110 yd freestyle relay	Australia; David Dickson; Murray Rose; Peter Doak; Peter Phelps	Canada; Aldy Meinhardt; Sandy Gilchrist; Jack Kelso; Dick Pound	England; Rodney Clayden; John Martin-Dye; Peter Kendrew; Stanley Clarke
4×220 yd freestyle relay	Australia; Allan Wood; Tony Strahan; Murray Rose; Bob Windle	Canada; Aldy Meinhardt; Sandy Gilchrist; Jack Kelso; Dick Pound	England; John Martin-Dye; Peter Kendrew; Richard Campion; Stanley Clarke
4×110 yd medley relay	Australia; David Dickson; Ian O'Brien; Julian Carroll; Kevin Berry	England; Graham Sykes; Neil Nicholson; Peter Kendrew; Terry Glenville	Canada; Aldy Meinhardt; Jack Kelso; Dick Pound; Steve Rabinovitch

Women's events

Event	Gold	Silver	Bronze
110 yd freestyle	Dawn Fraser (AUS)	Robyn Thorn (AUS)	Mary Stewart (CAN)
440 yd freestyle	Dawn Fraser (AUS)	Ilsa Konrads (AUS)	Liz Long (ENG)
110 yd backstroke	Linda Ludgrove (ENG)	Pam Sergeant (AUS)	Sylvia Lewis (ENG)
220 yd backstroke	Linda Ludgrove (ENG)	Sylvia Lewis (ENG)	Pam Sergeant (AUS)
110 yd breaststroke	Anita Lonsbrough (ENG)	Vivien Haddon (NZL)	Dorinda Fraser (ENG)
220 yd breaststroke	Anita Lonsbrough (ENG)	Jackie Enfield (ENG)	Vivien Haddon (NZL)
110 yd butterfly	Mary Stewart (CAN)	Mary-Anne Cotterill (ENG)	Linda McGill (AUS)
440 yd individual medley	Anita Lonsbrough (ENG)	Linda McGill (AUS)	Jennifer Corish (AUS)
4×110 yd freestyle relay	Australia; Dawn Fraser; Lyn Bell; Robyn Thorn; Ruth Everuss	Canada; Madeleine Sevigny; Mary Stewart; Patty Thompson; Sara Barber	England; Diana Wilkinson; Liz Long; Linda Amos; Sandra Keen
4×110 yd medley relay	Australia; Dawn Fraser; Linda McGill; Marguerite Ruygrok; Pamela Sergeant	England; Anita Lonsbrough; Diana Wilkinson; Linda Ludgrove; Mary-Anne Cotterill	Canada; Alison J. Glendenning; Mary Stewart; Patty Thompson; Sara Barber

== Finals (men) ==
=== 3m springboard ===
Pos	Athlete	Pts
1	(England) Brian Phelps	154.14
2	(Canada) Thomas Dinsley	147.22
3	(Canada) Ernie Meissner	145.03
4	(Australia) Graham Deuble	144.00
5	(England) Dennis Young	137.68
6	(Australia) John Pakarinen	133.61
7	(England) Keith Collin	131.79
8	(Australia) John Andrew Everding	130.58

=== 10m Platform ===
Pos	Athlete	Pts
1	(England) Brian Phelps	168.35
2	(Australia) Graham Deuble	151.00
3	(England) Tony Kitcher	150.81
4	(England) William Wood	143.00
5	(Australia) Gordon Thomas Creed	142.76
6	(Canada) Thomas Dinsley	140.92
7	(Canada) Ernie Meissner	128.25
8	(Australia) John Andrew Everding	127.32
9	(Scotland) Brian Davidson	123.93

=== 110y freestyle ===
Pos	Athlete	Time
1	(Canada) Dick Pound	55.8
2	(Scotland) Bob McGregor	56.1
3	(Australia) David Dickson	56.1
4	(Australia) Peter Doak	57.3
5	(Canada) Sandy Gilchrist	57.7
6	(England) Peter Kendrew	58.7
7	(Canada) Aldy Meinhardt	59.3
8	(Australia) Peter Phelps	59.7

=== 440y freestyle ===
Pos	Athlete	Time
1	(Australia) Murray Rose	4:20.0
2	(Australia) Allan Wood	4:22.5
3	(Australia) Bob Windle	4:23.1
4	(Canada) Sandy Gilchrist	4:32.7
5	(England) John Martin-Dye	4:36.0
6	(Singapore) Tan Thuan Heng	4:40.6
7	(Federation of Rhodesia and Nyasaland) W. Wilson	4:41.0
8	(England) Richard Campion	4:51.3

=== 1650y freestyle ===
Pos	Athlete	Time
1	(Australia) Murray Rose	17:18.1 mins
2	(Australia) Bob Windle	17:44.5
3	(Australia) Allan Wood	17:55.6
4	(Canada) Sandy Gilchrist	18:04.6
5	(Singapore) Tan Thuan Heng	18:25.3
6	(England) Richard Campion	19:06.8
7	(Hong Kong) Robert Loh	20:34.4

=== 110y backstroke ===
Pos	Athlete	Time
1	(England) Graham Sykes	1.04.5 mins
2	(Australia) Julian Carroll	1:05.4
3	(Australia) Wayne Vincent	1:06.2
4	(Wales) Roddy Jones	1:06.4
5	(New Zealand) Alan Robertson	1:07.3
6	(England) Rodney Clayden	1:07.3
7	(Scotland) Andrew Harrower	1:09.9

=== 220y backstroke ===
Pos	Athlete	Time
1	(Australia) Julian Carroll	2:20.9
2	(Australia) Tony Fingleton	2:21.0
3	(New Zealand) Alan Robertson	2:23.0
4	(Australia) Wayne Vincent	2:24.4
5	(England) Graham Sykes	2:25.5
6	(England) Rodney Clayden	2:27.8
7	(Wales) Roddy Jones	2:28.6
8	(Scotland) Andrew Harrower	2:32.7

=== 110y breaststroke ===
Pos	Athlete	Time
1	(Australia) Ian O'Brien	1:11.4
2	(Australia) William Burton	1:13.9
3	(Canada) Steve Rabinovitch	1:14.1
4	(England) Neil Nicholson	1:15.3
5	(Australia) James Frederick Campbell	1:16.8
6	(England) Christopher Wilkinson	1:18.5
7	(Federation of Rhodesia and Nyasaland) Bernie Parkin	1:18.7
8	(Scotland) Cleve Cowie	1:19.0

=== 220y breaststroke ===
Pos	Athlete	Time
1	(Australia) Ian O'Brien	2:38.2
2	(Australia) William Burton	2:42.1
3	(England) Neil Nicholson	2:42.6
4	(England) Christopher Wilkinson	2:44.1
5	(Australia) James Frederick Campbell	2:45.0
6	(Canada) Steve Rabinovitch	2:48.0
7	(Federation of Rhodesia and Nyasaland) Bernie Parkin	2:50.9
8	(Wales) John Beaven	2:51.7

=== 110y butterfly ===
Pos	Athlete	Time
1	(Australia) Kevin Berry	0:59.5 mins
2	(Australia) Neville Hayes	1:02.3
3	(Canada) Aldy Meinhardt	1:02.6
4	(Australia) Brett Hill	1:03.3
5	(Wales) Brian Jenkins	1:03.5
6	(New Zealand) David Gerrard	1:03.5
7	(England) Terry Glenville	1:03.5
8	(Scotland) Ian Blyth	1:05.8

=== 220y butterfly ===
Pos	Athlete	Time
1	(Australia) Kevin Berry	2:10.8 mins
2	(Australia) Neville Hayes	2:16.3
3	(Australia) Brett Hill	2:18.7
4	(Wales) Brian Jenkins	2:21.0
5	(New Zealand) David Gerrard	2:21.7
6	(England) Terry Glenville	2:27.1
7	(Scotland) Ian Blyth	2:32.0

=== 440y indiv medley ===
Pos	Athlete	Time
1	(Australia) Alex Alexander	5:15.3
2	(Australia) John Oravainen	5:16.3
3	(Canada) Jack Kelso	5:16.5
4	(Australia) William Andrew Ebsary	5:17.0
5	(New Zealand) Allan H. Seagar	5:19.7
6	(England) Richard Campion	5:29.2
7	(Wales) Brian Jenkins	5:30.0
8	(Scotland) Andrew Harrower	5:42.1

=== 4x110y freestyle relay ===
Pos	Athlete	Time
1	(Australia) Dickson, Rose, Doak, Phelps	3:43.9
2	(Canada) Meinhardt, Gilchrist, Kelso, Pound	3:48.3
3	(England) Clayden, Martin-Dye, Kendrew, Clarke	3:51.3

=== 4x220y freestyle relay ===
Pos	Athlete	Time
1	(Australia) Wood, Strahan, Rose, Windle	8:13.4
2	(Canada) Meinhardt, Gilchrist, Kelso, Pound	8:42.4
3	(England) Martin-Dye, Kendrew, Campion,Clarke	8:46.0

=== 4x110y medley relay ===
Pos	Athlete	Time
1	(Australia) Dickson, O'Brien,Carroll, Berry	4:12.4
2	(England) Sykes, Nicholson, Kendrew, Glenville	4:19.9
3	(Canada) Meinhardt, Kelso, Pound, Rabinovitch	4:19.9
4	(Scotland) McGregor, Harrower, Cowie, Blyth	4:32.9

== Finals (women) ==
=== 3m springboard ===
Pos	Athlete	Pts
1	(Australia) Susan Knight	134.72
2	(England) Liz Ferris	132.74
3	(Australia) Lorraine McArthur	125.13
4	(Federation of Rhodesia and Nyasaland) L. M. Grant-Stuart	124.05
5	(England) Margaret Austen	116.49
6	(Australia) Lynette Oatley	111.82

=== 10m Platform ===
Pos	Athlete	Pts
1	(Australia) Susan Knight	101.15
2	(England) Margaret Austen	98.83
3	(Australia) Patricia Plowman	91.79
4	(Australia) Diana Norma Robinson	91.50
5	(England) Joy Newman	91.26

=== 110y freestyle ===
Pos	Athlete	Time
1	(Australia) Dawn Fraser	59.5 mins
2	(Australia) Robyn Thorn	1:03.8
3	(Canada) Mary Stewart	1:04.4
4	(Australia) Lyn Bell	1:04.4
5	(England) Diana Wilkinson	1:04.6
6	(Canada) Patty Thompson	1:05.1
7	(England) Linda Amos	1:05.1
8	(Federation of Rhodesia and Nyasaland) Marilyn Sidelsky	1:06.1

=== 440y freestyle ===
Pos	Athlete	Time
1	(Australia) Dawn Fraser	4:51.4
2	(Australia) Ilsa Konrads	4:55.0
3	(England) Liz Long	5:00.4
4	(Canada) Patty Thompson	5:04.5
5	(England) Anita Lonsbrough	5:06.8
6	(New Zealand) Lesley C. Moore	5:09.3
7	(Australia) Cheryl Janette Kensett	5:10.6
8	(New Zealand) Shirley A. Nicholson	5:17.6

=== 110y backstroke ===
Pos	Athlete	Time
1	(England) Linda Ludgrove	1:11.1
2	(Australia) Pamela Fay Sergeant	1:11.5
3	(England) Sylvia Lewis	1:12.2
4	(Australia) Jill Ann Bolton	1:12.4
5	(Australia) Sue Costin	1:12.4
6	(Canada) Sara Barber	1:13.1
7	(New Zealand) Margaret Macrae	1:14.9
8	(Scotland) Louise Campbell	1:14.9

=== 220y backstroke ===
Pos	Athlete	Time
1	(England) Linda Ludgrove	2:35.2
2	(England) Sylvia Lewis	2:36.7
3	(Australia) Pamela Fay Sergeant	2:37.5
4	(Australia) Jill Ann Bolton	2:38.1
5	(Australia) Sue Costin	2:38.6
6	(Canada) Sara Barber	2:40.4
7	(New Zealand) Margaret Macrae	2:41.3
8	(Scotland) Louise Campbell	2:45.5

=== 110y breaststroke ===
Pos	Athlete	Time
1	(England) Anita Lonsbrough	1:21.3
2	(New Zealand) Vivien Haddon	1:21.3
3	(England) Dorinda Fraser	1:21.7
4	(England) Jackie Enfield	1:23.9
5	(Australia) Claire Cook	1:24.9
6	(Scotland) Ann Baxter	1:24.9
7	(Australia) Marguerite Ruygrok	1:25.0
8	(Canada) Alison J. Glendenning	1:25.1

=== 220y breaststroke ===
Pos	Athlete	Time
1	(England) Anita Lonsbrough	2:51.7
2	(England) Jackie Enfield	2:54.7
3	(New Zealand) Vivien Haddon	2:56.3
4	(Australia) Claire Cook	2:57.6
5	(Australia) Marguerite Ruygrok	2:58.8
6	(England) Dorinda Fraser	2:59.2
7	(Australia) Janet Hogan	3:03.1
8	(Canada) Alison J. Glendenning	3:03.5

=== 110y butterfly ===
Pos	Athlete	Time
1	(Canada) Mary Stewart	1:10.1
2	(England) Mary-Anne Cotterill	1:11.2
3	(Australia) Linda McGill	1:11.6
4	(Wales) Glenda Phillips	1:12.7
5	(England) Judy Gegan	1:12.7
6	(Australia) Marion Elizabeth Foye	1:13.3
7	(Scotland) Sheila Watt	1:14.8

=== 440y indiv medley ===
Pos	Athlete	Time
1	(England) Anita Lonsbrough	5:38.6
2	(Australia) Linda McGill	5:46.1
3	(Australia) Jennifer Anne Corish	5:53.0
4	(New Zealand) Helen F. Rogers	5:58.3
5	(Australia) Jane Cortis	6:00.2
6	(Wales) Jocelyn Hooper	6:18.7

=== 4×110y freestyle relay ===
Pos	Athlete	Time
1	(Australia) Fraser, Bell, Thorn, Everuss	4:11.0
2	(Canada) Sevigny, Stewart, Thompson, Barber	4:21.1
3	(England) Wilkinson, Long, Amos, Keen	4:21.3
4	(Federation of Rhodesia and Nyasaland) Cartwright, Butler, Sutcliffe, Sidelsky	4:30.9
5	(New Zealand) Rogers, Moore, Macrae, Nicholson	4:34.6

=== 4×110y medley relay ===
Pos	Athlete	Time
1	(Australia) Fraser, MCGill, Ruygrok, Sergeant	4:45.9
2	(England) Lonsbrough, Wilkinson, Ludgrove, Cotterill	4:47.9
3	(Canada) Glendenning, Stewart, Thompson, Barber	4:48.1
4	(New Zealand) Rogers, Moore, Macrae, Haddon	4:57.2
5	(Federation of Rhodesia and Nyasaland) Butler, Sutcliffe, Wood, Sidelsky	5:13.0
