= Great Britain at the 1964 Summer Olympics =

- Flag of the United Kingdom
- IOC code: GBR (GBI used at these Games)
- NOC: British Olympic Association

in Tokyo
- Competitors: 204 (160 men and 44 women) in 17 sports
- Flag bearers: Anita Lonsbrough (opening); Allan Jay (closing)
- Medals Ranked 10th: Gold 4 Silver 12 Bronze 2 Total 18

Summer Olympics appearances (overview)
- 1896; 1900; 1904; 1908; 1912; 1920; 1924; 1928; 1932; 1936; 1948; 1952; 1956; 1960; 1964; 1968; 1972; 1976; 1980; 1984; 1988; 1992; 1996; 2000; 2004; 2008; 2012; 2016; 2020; 2024

Other related appearances
- 1906 Intercalated Games

Great Britain, represented by the British Olympic Association (BOA), competed at the 1964 Summer Olympics in Tokyo, Japan. 204 competitors, 160 men and 44 women, took part in 124 events in 17 sports. British athletes have competed and won at least one gold medal in every Summer Olympic Games. Future Leader of the Liberal Democrats Menzies Campbell represented Britain at the 200m.

== Medallists ==
Medals by sport
Sport	Gold medal	Silver medal	Bronze medal	Total
Athletics	4	7	1	12
Fencing	0	1	0	1
Rowing	0	1	0	1
Sailing	0	1	0	1
Swimming	0	1	0	1
Weightlifting	0	1	0	1
Equestrian	0	0	1	1
Total	4	12	2	18

=== Gold ===
- Ken Matthews — Athletics, Men's 20 km Walk
- Lynn Davies — Athletics, Men's Long Jump
- Ann Packer — Athletics, Women's 800 metres
- Mary Rand — Athletics, Women's Long Jump

=== Silver ===
- Basil Heatley — Athletics, Men's Marathon
- John Cooper — Athletics, Men's 400 m Hurdles
- Maurice Herriott — Athletics, Men's 3000 m Steeplechase
- Adrian Metcalfe, Robbie Brightwell, John Cooper, and Tim Graham — Athletics, Men's 4 × 400 m Relay
- Paul Nihill — Athletics, Men's 50 km Walk
- Ann Packer — Athletics, Women's 400 metres
- Mary Rand — Athletics, Women's Pentathlon
- Henry Hoskyns — Fencing, Men's Épée Individual
- John Russell, Hugh Wardell-Yerburgh, William Barry, and John James — Rowing, Men's Coxless Fours
- Robert McGregor — Swimming, Men's 100 m Freestyle
- Louis Martin — Weightlifting, Men's Middle Heavyweight
- Keith Musto and Tony Morgan — Sailing, Men's Flying Dutchman

=== Bronze ===
- Janet Simpson, Daphne Arden, Dorothy Hyman, and Mary Rand — Athletics, Women's 4 × 100 m Relay
- Peter Robeson — Equestrian, Jumping Individual

== Athletics ==
Men's Hammer Throw

- Howard Payne

- Qualifying Round — 61.90m (→ did not advance, 17th place)

== Cycling ==
Twelve cyclists represented Great Britain in 1964.

Individual road race

- Colin Lewis
- Terry West
- Derek Harrison
- Michael Cowley

Team time trial

- Bob Addy
- Michael Cowley
- Derek Harrison
- Colin Lewis

Sprint

- Karl Barton
- Christopher Church

1000m time trial

- Roger Whitfield

Tandem

- Karl Barton
- Christopher Church

Individual pursuit

- Hugh Porter

Team pursuit

- Trevor Bull
- Harry Jackson
- Hugh Porter
- Brian Sandy

== Diving ==
Men

Athlete	Event	Preliminary		Final			
Athlete	Event	Points	Rank	Points	Rank	Total	Rank
John Candler	3 m springboard	90.69	9	Did not advance			
Tony Kitcher	10 m platform	89.95	16	Did not advance			
Brian Phelps	10 m platform	93.85	4 Q	49.33	6	143.18	6
Billy Wood	10 m platform	81.82	25	Did not advance			

Women

Athlete	Event	Preliminary		Final			
Athlete	Event	Points	Rank	Points	Rank	Total	Rank
Frances Cramp	10 m platform	45.48	14	Did not advance			
Joy Newman	10 m platform	42.72	19	Did not advance			

== Fencing ==
13 fencers, 9 men and 4 women, represented Great Britain in 1964.

Men's foil

- Bill Hoskyns
- Allan Jay
- Sandy Leckie

Men's team foil

- Bill Hoskyns, Allan Jay, Sandy Leckie, Ralph Cooperman, Derrick Cawthorne

Men's épée

- Bill Hoskyns
- Allan Jay
- Peter Jacobs

Men's team épée

- Bill Hoskyns, John Pelling, Peter Jacobs, Michael Howard, Allan Jay

Men's sabre

- Ralph Cooperman
- Sandy Leckie
- Richard Oldcorn

Men's team sabre

- Richard Oldcorn, Sandy Leckie, Ralph Cooperman, Michael Howard, Bill Hoskyns

Women's foil

- Mary Watts-Tobin
- Shirley Netherway
- Janet Bewley-Cathie

Women's team foil

- Shirley Netherway, Theresa Offredy, Janet Bewley-Cathie, Mary Watts-Tobin

== Judo ==
Four male Judoka represented Great Britain in 1964.

Individual

- Brian Jacks
- Syd Hoare
- Tony Sweeney
- Alan Petherbridge

== Modern pentathlon ==
Three male pentathletes represented Great Britain in 1964.

Individual

- Benjamin Finnis
- Robert Phelps
- Jim Fox

Team

- Benjamin Finnis
- Robert Phelps
- Jim Fox

== Rowing ==
- Double scull - Arnold Cooke and Peter Webb - Seventh
- Coxless pair - David Lee Nicholson and Stewart Farquharson - Fourth
- Coxless four - John Russell, Hugh Wardell-Yerburgh, William Barry, and John James - Silver

== Shooting ==
Eight shooters represented Great Britain in 1964.

25 m pistol

- Tony Clark
- Alan Bray

50 m pistol

- Anthony Chivers
- Harry Cullum

50 m rifle, prone

- Peter Morgan
- John Hall

Trap

- Bob Braithwaite
- Joe Wheater

== Swimming ==
Men

Athlete	Event	Heat		Semifinal		Final	
Athlete	Event	Time	Rank	Time	Rank	Time	Rank
Dave Haller	100 m freestyle	57.7	=47	Did not advance			
Bob Lord	100 m freestyle	55.7	17 Q	56.5	=23	Did not advance	
Bobby McGregor	100 m freestyle	54.7	3 Q	54.3	=3 Q	53.5	2nd place, silver medalist(s)
Bob Lord	400 m freestyle	4:33.2	=29	—N/a		Did not advance	
John Martin-Dye	400 m freestyle	4:34.3	32	—N/a		Did not advance	
John Thurley	400 m freestyle	4:31.0	28	—N/a		Did not advance	
John Thurley	1500 m freestyle	18:12.3	21	—N/a		Did not advance	
Geoff Thwaites	200 m backstroke	2:22.0	23	Did not advance			
Neil Nicholson	200 m breaststroke	2:36.6	12 Q	2:39.9	16	Did not advance	
Brian Jenkins	200 m butterfly	2:15.5	=12 Q	2:15.5	14	Did not advance	
Bob Lord; John Martin-Dye; Peter Kendrew; Bobby McGregor	4 × 100 m freestyle relay	3:42.7	8 Q	—N/a		3:42.6	7
John Martin-Dye; John Thurley; Bob Lord; Bobby McGregor	4 × 200 m freestyle relay	8:30.9	13	—N/a		Did not advance	
Geoff Thwaites; Neil Nicholson; Brian Jenkins; Bobby McGregor	4 × 100 m medley relay	4:12.3	8 Q	—N/a		4:11.4	8

Women

Athlete	Event	Heat		Semifinal		Final	
Athlete	Event	Time	Rank	Time	Rank	Time	Rank
Linda Amos	100 m freestyle	1:06.1	35	Did not advance			
Sandra Keen	100 m freestyle	1:04.7	25	Did not advance			
Diana Wilkinson	100 m freestyle	1:05.0	27	Did not advance			
Liz Long	400 m freestyle	4:54.5	7 Q	—N/a		4:52.0	6
Pauline Sillett	400 m freestyle	5:12.2	27	—N/a		Did not advance	
Sylvia Lewis	100 m backstroke	1:12.2	=19	—N/a		Did not advance	
Linda Ludgrove	100 m backstroke	1:10.3	7 Q	—N/a		1:09.5	6
Jill Norfolk	100 m backstroke	1:10.6	8 Q	—N/a		1:11.2	8
Jackie Enfield	200 m breaststroke	2:54.9	13	—N/a		Did not advance	
Stella Mitchell	200 m breaststroke	2:48.8	3 Q	—N/a		2:49.0	4
Jill Slattery	200 m breaststroke	2:50.2	7 Q	—N/a		2:49.6	5
Anne Cotterill	100 m butterfly	1:09.4	8 Q	1:09.4	11	Did not advance	
Judy Gegan	100 m butterfly	1:10.8	16 Q	1:10.5	13	Did not advance	
Glenda Phillips	100 m butterfly	1:10.3	=11 Q	1:10.6	14	Did not advance	
Pam Johnson	400 m individual medley	6:11.9	22	—N/a		Did not advance	
Anita Lonsbrough	400 m individual medley	5:30.6	4 Q	—N/a		5:30.5	7
Sandra Keen; Pauline Sillett; Liz Long; Diana Wilkinson	4 × 100 m freestyle relay	4:15.1	9	—N/a		Did not advance	
Jill Norfolk; Stella Mitchell; Anne Cotterill; Liz Long	4 × 100 m medley relay	4:44.3	6 Q	—N/a		4:45.8	5

== Weightlifting ==
Louis Martin
