= Allan Wood =

Australian swimmer (1943–2022)

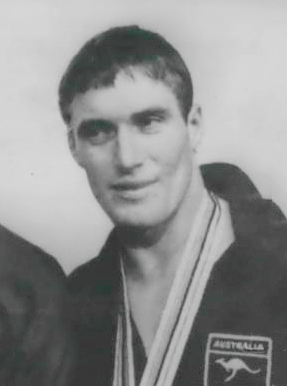
- Wood at the 1964 Summer Olympics

Personal information
- Full name: Allan Frederick Wood
- National team: Australia
- Born: 16 May 1943 Wollongong, New South Wales, Australia
- Died: 10 October 2022 (aged 79) Tugun, Queensland, Australia
- Height: 1.77 m (5 ft 10 in)
- Weight: 68 kg (150 lb)

Sport
- Sport: Swimming
- Strokes: Freestyle
Medal record
Men's swimming
Representing Australia
Olympic Games
Bronze medal – third place	1964 Tokyo	400 m freestyle
Bronze medal – third place	1964 Tokyo	1500 m freestyle
British Empire and Commonwealth Games
Gold medal – first place	1962 Perth	4 × 220 yards freestyle relay
Silver medal – second place	1962 Perth	440 yards freestyle
Bronze medal – third place	1962 Perth	1650 yards freestyle

Allan Frederick Wood (16 May 1943 – 10 October 2022) was an Australian freestyle swimmer, who won bronze medals in the 400-metre and 1500-metre freestyle events at the 1964 Summer Olympics in Tokyo. He spent his entire career in the shadow of fellow Australian distance freestyle swimmers Murray Rose and Bob Windle who won Olympic gold medals.

== Early life and career ==
Coming from Wollongong, Wood made his debut at the 1960 Summer Olympics in Rome, where he was a member of the 4×200-metre freestyle relay team, swimming in the heats. Although the team of John Devitt, John Konrads, David Dickson, and Rose proceeded to claim bronze in the final, Wood was not awarded a medal, as heat swimmers were not entitled to one until 1984.

Wood had been expected to do well at the 1962 Commonwealth Games in Perth, Western Australia, as he was the Australian 880-yard freestyle champion. However, a last-minute public appeal brought Rose back from the United States, where he was studying and competing in the US collegiate system. Wood was relegated to silver in the 440-yard freestyle behind Rose, and bronze in the 1650-yard freestyle, behind Rose and Windle. Wood won a gold medal in the 4×220-yard freestyle relay, alongside Windle, Rose, and Tony Strahan and help to set a world record in the process.

== 1964 Summer Olympics ==
Prior to the Tokyo Olympics, Wood's coach, Don Talbot, strove to change Wood's technique, slowing down the stroke rate, but increasing the deepness of the strokes. This paid dividends at the Olympics when Wood, who had never swum faster than 4 minutes, 20 seconds in the 400-metre freestyle, dropped his personal best to 4 minutes, 15.1 seconds, to claim bronze behind American Don Schollander and East Germany's Frank Wiegand. In the 1500-metre freestyle, Wood posted a time of 17 minutes, 7.7 seconds, a 20-second drop in his personal best, in a race won by Windle in Olympic record time. Among the swimmers who Wood defeated was Roy Saari, the world record holder in the event. Wood narrowly missed a third medal when he, Windle, Dickson, and Peter Doak finished fourth in the 4×200-metre freestyle relay.

== Later life ==
Wood retired from swimming competitively after the 1964 Olympics and became a swimming coach. Later in life, he moved to the Gold Coast, Queensland, and bred horses in the Currumbin Valley. In 1984, he received his bronze medal from the 1960 Olympics, the International Olympic Committee awarding them retrospectively.

On 10 October 2022, Wood died of cancer at John Flynn Private Hospital in Tugun, Gold Coast. He was 79.
