= Ian O'Brien =

Australian swimmer

Personal information
- Full name: Ian Lovett O'Brien
- National team: Australia
- Born: 3 March 1947 (age 79) Wellington, New South Wales, Australia
- Height: 185 cm (6 ft 1 in)
- Weight: 89 kg (196 lb)

Sport
- Sport: Swimming
- Strokes: Breaststroke
Medal record
Men's swimming
Representing Australia
Olympic Games
Gold medal – first place	1964 Tokyo	200 m breaststroke
Bronze medal – third place	1964 Tokyo	4×100 m medley
Commonwealth Games
Gold medal – first place	1962 Perth	110 yd breaststroke
Gold medal – first place	1962 Perth	220 yd breaststroke
Gold medal – first place	1962 Perth	4×110 yd medley
Gold medal – first place	1966 Kingston	110 yd breaststroke
Gold medal – first place	1966 Kingston	220 yd breaststroke

Ian Lovett O'Brien (born 3 March 1947) is an Australian breaststroke swimmer of the 1960s who won the 200 metre breaststroke at the 1964 Summer Olympics in Tokyo in world record time. He won five Commonwealth Games gold medals and claimed a total of nine individual and six relay titles at the Australian Championships, before retiring at the age of 21 due to financial pressures.

After showing promise at an early age, O'Brien was sent to Sydney to train under renowned coach Forbes Carlile and his breaststroke assistant Terry Gathercole. He competed in his first national championships in 1962 at the age of 15, winning the 220 yard breaststroke to gain selection for the 1962 British Empire and Commonwealth Games in Perth, where he won both the 110 and 220 yd (200 m) breaststroke and the 4 × 110 yd medley relay.

He won both breaststroke events at the 1963 Australian Championships, repeating the feat for the next three years. In 1964, O'Brien went to the Tokyo Olympics and came from third at the 150 m mark to win the gold medal. He added a bronze in the medley relay. O'Brien successfully defended both his breaststroke titles at the 1966 British Empire and Commonwealth Games in Kingston, Jamaica before retiring to support his family. Swimming officials persuaded him to make a comeback for the 1968 Summer Olympics in Mexico City, as Australia did not have a breaststroker, and after a crash diet, he finished sixth in the 100 m event but failed to reach the final in the 200 m event. He then retired and went into the television industry.

== Early years ==
O'Brien grew up in the rural town of Wellington, 360 kilometres (225 miles) from Sydney. Neither of his parents were skilled swimmers. His father Roy knew only one swimming stroke—the breaststroke—and his mother Thelma did not take her first swimming lesson until she was 55. O'Brien's sister Ann was a talented swimmer in her childhood years, but she preferred horseback riding. The local pool was an old-style facility that had no pump system and was only manually drained once a week. Aged four, O'Brien got his first swimming lessons from the local Learn to Swim program. There were not many non-sporting activities for children in Wellington, and O'Brien played basketball and rugby league, did athletics and swimming, and rode horses. In 1954, a chlorinated pool was built in the town, leading to the formation of Wellington Swimming Club. At the age of 10, O'Brien began competitive swimming under local coach Bert Eslick, and raced in regional country swimming carnivals at Dubbo, Bathurst and Orange.

After winning all the breaststroke events at the country championships, O'Brien was taken by his father to the Ryde pool in Sydney in 1960, to be coached by Forbes Carlile and his assistant, retired world record-breaking breaststroker Terry Gathercole. Carlile was regarded as the leading swimming coach in Australia at the time. At age 13, O'Brien was already a large teenager, weighing in at 82.6 kg. He only trained with Gathercole during holidays, when his father could take him to Sydney; Jim Wilkins, a Catholic priest in Bathurst, supervised him according to Gathercole's program while he was in the countryside. Within a year, O'Brien rose from being a country carnival champion to a national-level athlete, despite the death of his father in the same year.

== International debut ==
In 1962, O'Brien gained selection for the Australian swimming team at the age of 15 when he won the 220 yard (yd) breaststroke at his first Australian Championships in the time of 2 minutes (min) 41.8 seconds (s). He added a second gold as part of the New South Wales team that won the 4 × 100 m medley relay in a time of 4 min 18.3 s. His performances gained him selection for the 1962 British Empire and Commonwealth Games in Perth. At his first international competition, he won gold in each of his three events. He competed in the 110 yd (100 m) and 220 yd (200 m) breaststroke, defeating fellow Australian William Burton in both events with times of 1 min 11.4s and 2 min 38.1 s, respectively. He then completed his campaign with a victory in the 4 × 110 yd medley relay, combining with Julian Carroll, Kevin Berry and David Dickson to complete the race in a time of 4 min 12.4 s.

In 1963, O'Brien captured the breaststroke double at the Australian Championships, setting personal bests in both events, and was a member of the New South Wales team that won the medley relay. His performances earned him selection for an overseas tour to Europe with the Australian team, competing in the Soviet Union, Germany and England before visiting Japan and Hong Kong. O'Brien defended his breaststroke double at the 1964 Australian Championships, lowering his times to 1 min 8.1 s and 2 min 32.6 s for the 100 metres (m) and 200 m breaststroke respectively. He capped off his campaign as well as a third consecutive medley relay triumph for New South Wales. Within a year, he had reduced his times in the two events by more than 3%. As O'Brien was widely regarded as Australia's best breaststroker, he was selected for the 1964 Summer Olympics in Tokyo. O'Brien joined the rest of the team for the national camp before the Olympics in Ayr in northern Queensland, where he trained under head coach Don Talbot. O'Brien described Talbot as a "slavedriver", but felt that the experience was invaluable.

== Olympic gold ==
Arriving in Tokyo, O'Brien was nominated in the 200 m event and the medley relay; the 100 m event was yet to be included in the Olympic program. The favourites for the 200 m breaststroke were Chet Jastremski of the United States—the world record holder—and Georgy Prokopenko of the Soviet Union. Gathercole had modelled O'Brien's technique on that of Jastremski, attempting to refine and smoothen it. Years after O'Brien retired, Harry Gallagher said that "Ian O'Brien has an almost faultless style and is a great example for Australian youngsters to copy". O'Brien was known for the strength that his torso generated, and his powerful kicks; sports science experiments showed that his vertical jump was especially strong. O'Brien was also known for his efficient start off the block. He often gained a lead of approximately a metre from his dive and underwater glide at the start, and was able to complete 50 m in 31.0 s.

During the final training sessions in Tokyo, Talbot organised time trials for the Australians, which were held in front of opposition swimmers in an attempt to intimidate them. O'Brien posted a time of 2 min 33 s, which Talbot felt had a negative psychological effect on O'Brien's opponents. When competition started, O'Brien swam an Olympic record to win the first heat by 2.0 s. He posted a time of 2 min 31.4 s, reducing the previous Olympic mark by 5.8 s, an indication of how much the world record had fallen in the preceding four years. However, in the next heat, Egon Henninger of Germany immediately lowered the mark, and by the end of the heats, O'Brien was the fourth fastest qualifier for the semifinals, with both Prokopenko and Jastremski posting faster times. O'Brien lowered Henninger's Olympic record by winning the second semifinal in a time of 2 min 28.7 s, after Jastremski had won the first semifinal in a time that was 3.4 s slower than O'Brien. This made O'Brien the fastest qualifier for the final, with a time that was 1.0 s faster than the next qualifier Prokopenko, who came second to him in the second semifinal. O'Brien planned to swim the race at an even pace and record even splits for the first and second half of the race. He was mindful of not chasing Jastremski, who was known for an aggressive opening style, which resulted in a faster first half.

In the final, Jastremski attacked from the outset as expected, while O'Brien raced with a characteristically even pace. After being fourth at the halfway mark behind Jastremski, Prokopenko and Henninger, O'Brien panicked and accelerated in the third 50 m and overtook Jastremski, leaving the American in fourth place. He then moved past Henninger, before overtaking Prokopenko. O'Brien's acceleration in the third meant that he tired at the end, but he had enough energy to fend off Prokopenko in the late stages to win the gold medal in a new world record time of 2 min 27.8 s, a margin of 0.4 s, with Jastremski a further 1.4 s in arrears. O'Brien had reduced his personal best time by more than four seconds during the Olympics to claim an upset win.

The Australian coaches rested O'Brien for the heats of the 4 × 100 m medley relay; Peter Tonkin swam the breaststroke leg instead. It turned out to be a close call for the Australians, as they finished fourth in their heat and qualified seventh fastest, only 1.2 s from elimination. In the final, O'Brien was brought into the team to combine with Peter Reynolds, Berry and Dickson. At the end of Reynolds' backstroke leg, Australia were sixth, 3.4 s behind the American leaders. O'Brien dived in and completed his leg in 1 min 7.8 s, a breaststroke split bettered by only Henninger and Prokopenko. This pulled Australia up to fourth position, 1.7 s in arrears of the Americans at the halfway mark. Australia progressed further to finish third behind the United States and Germany in a time of 4 min 2.3 s, missing the silver by 0.7 s.

== Later career ==
O'Brien completed a hat-trick of breaststroke doubles at the 1965 Australian Championships, but in a year with no international competition, he swam much slower times of 1 min 11.1 s and 2 min 38.6 s respectively. He completed a fourth consecutive medley relay win with New South Wales. At the 1966 Australian Championships, his times were again slower, at 1 min 11.8 s and 2 min 41.6 s respectively, more than 4% slower than his personal bests, but it was still enough to retain his titles and qualify for the 1966 British Empire and Commonwealth Games in Kingston, Jamaica. Critics had written him off, because just six weeks before the competition, he was 16 kg overweight. However, he returned to his peak form by the time the team reached Jamaica, where he won both breaststroke events with times of 1 min 8.2 s and 2 min 29.3 s respectively. His winning run in the 4 × 100 m medley relay came to an end when the Australians were disqualified for an illegal changeover.

In 1967, O'Brien skipped the Australian Championships because he had no sponsorship and ran out of money, forcing him to seek full-time work. In 1968, despite Graham Edwards winning the National 200 m breaststroke title, the Australian Swimming Union persuaded an overweight O'Brien to make a comeback in 1968 on the grounds that Australia did not have a quality breaststroker for the Olympics. Undergoing a crash diet and fitness program, O'Brien lost 12.7 kg in twelve weeks of intense training. O'Brien was unable to reclaim either of his individual Australian titles, but New South Wales again won the medley relay. Nevertheless, he was selected for his second Olympics.

At the 1968 Summer Olympics in Mexico City, O'Brien placed second in his heat of the 200 m breaststroke in a time of 2 min 36.8 s, which placed him 13th. He was eliminated, having been 2.9 s slower than the last-placed qualifier for the final. The eventual winner posted a time 0.9 s slower than that of O'Brien four years earlier. O'Brien did better in the newly introduced 100 m event, winning his heat in a time of 1 min 8.9 s to qualify second-fastest for the semifinals. O'Brien scraped into the final after coming second in his semifinal in a time of 1 min 9.0 s. It was the barest of margins; O'Brien was the slowest qualifier and could not be electronically separated from the ninth-fastest semifinalist, with judges being used to decide the placings. O'Brien went on to finish sixth in a time of 1 min 8.6 s.

O'Brien narrowly missed a medal in the 4 × 100 m medley relay. Along with Michael Wenden, Robert Cusack and Karl Byrom, the Australian quartet won their heat and entered the final as the equal fifth fastest qualifier. In the final, O'Brien swam his leg in 1 min 8.6 s, which was only the fifth fastest breaststroke leg. Australia were fourth at the end of each leg, except O'Brien's, when they were third. Australia eventually missed out on the bronze by 0.1 s to the Soviet Union. O'Brien admitted that his training had been insufficient for Olympic standards, noting that "I needed to put on another thousand kilometres in training". O'Brien also rued the absence of Talbot to motivate him to work, and had a further accident at the Olympic Village when his fingers were slammed by a closing window. Under competition regulations, he was not allowed to bind his hand during competition.

== Out of the pool ==
At age 21, O'Brien retired after the 1968 Olympics, so he could concentrate solely on making a living. Since his father's death in 1962, O'Brien's swimming career had caused substantial financial stress for his family, with his mother having to sell the family home to make ends meet. O'Brien had also been forced to leave high school before he had completed his leaving certificate, so that he could support the family's income by wrapping parcels. Television and camera work had always interested O'Brien, and he secured a job as a stagehand for Channel Nine after returning from the Tokyo Olympics, which he held for more than ten years. He then worked for Channel Ten for two years, before working for an independent production company for another two years. In 1979, he started Videopak, which became one of the largest privately owned television documentary companies in Australia. Videopak's sound stages were used by public and private television companies. O'Brien was inducted into the Sport Australia Hall of Fame in 1986. In 2000, he received an Australian Sports Medal. As of 2026 O'Brien is still operating cameras for sports broadcasting, including 53 Bathurst 1000 races.

He was mentioned by name, including a brief video cut, by the commentators for the 2026 Bathurst 1000.

== See also ==
- List of members of the International Swimming Hall of Fame
- List of Commonwealth Games medallists in swimming (men)
- List of Olympic medalists in swimming (men)
- World record progression 200 metres breaststroke
