= David Dickson (swimmer) =

Australian freestyle swimmer

Personal information
- Full name: David Gavin Dickson
- National team: Australia
- Born: 20 February 1941 (age 85) Batu Gajah, British Malaya
- Height: 1.79 m (5 ft 10 in)
- Weight: 76 kg (168 lb)

Sport
- Sport: Swimming
- Strokes: Freestyle
Medal record
Men's swimming
Representing Australia
Olympic Games
Bronze medal – third place	1960 Rome	4×200 m freestyle
Bronze medal – third place	1964 Tokyo	4×100 m freestyle
Bronze medal – third place	1964 Tokyo	4×100 m medley
British Empire and Commonwealth Games
Gold medal – first place	1962 Perth	4×440 yd freestyle
Gold medal – first place	1962 Perth	4×440 yd medley
Bronze medal – third place	1962 Perth	110 yd freestyle
Gold medal – first place	1966 Kingston	4×440 yd freestyle
Gold medal – first place	1966 Kingston	4×880 yd freestyle
Bronze medal – third place	1966 Kingston	110 yd freestyle

David Gavin Dickson (born 20 February 1941) is an Australian freestyle swimmer who won three bronze medals in freestyle and medley relay events at the 1960 Summer Olympics and the 1964 Summer Olympics in Rome and Tokyo respectively.

== Swimming career ==
Dickson was born in Malaya, where his father was stationed during World War II. He was three months old when he arrived in Perth, Western Australia. His schooling years were spent in Malaya, Geelong and Bunbury. Dickson was a member of the Bunbury Swimming Club.

=== Australian Championships ===
- 110 yd freestyle - first in 1961, 1963, 1964, 1965
- 220 yd freestyle - first in 1965

=== Summer Olympics ===
Dickson was selected to make his international debut at the 1960 Rome Olympics in the 4×200-metre freestyle relay. With John Konrads, Jon Henricks and Murray Rose, Dickson broke the world record on 6 August 1960, at the Tobruk Pool in Townsville, Queensland. However, in the Olympic final, swimming alongside individual gold medallists John Devitt, Murray Rose and John Konrads, Dickson finished third behind the United States and Japanese teams.

Prior to the Tokyo Olympics, Dickson was sent on an international tour to compete, along with Berry, O'Brien and Bob Windle, in the hope that their honed racecraft would help them in Tokyo. The other three won gold in their respective events, but Dickson was eliminated in the semifinal of the 100m freestyle.

Along with John Ryan, Doak and Windle, Dickson won bronze in the 4×100-metre freestyle relay. He complemented this with another bronze in the 4×100-metre medley relay, alongside Berry, O'Brien and Peter Reynolds. He narrowly missed a medal in the 4×200-metre freestyle relay, finishing fourth with Windle, Doak and Allan Wood. He finished ninth in the 100-metre freestyle.

=== British Empire and Commonwealth Games ===
At the 1962 Commonwealth Games in Perth, Dickson finished third in the 110-yard freestyle, beaten by Dick Pound of Canada and Bobby McGregor of Scotland. However, Dickson won gold in the 4×110-yard freestyle relay (with Rose, Peter Doak and Peter Phelps) and the 4×110-yard medley relay with Julian Carroll, Ian O'Brien and Kevin Berry, all of whom had won their respective individual events.

Dickson was accorded the honour of carrying the Australian flag at the 1966 Commonwealth Games in Kingston, Jamaica. He again took the bronze medal in the 110-yard freestyle, won by fellow Australian Michael Wenden, and won gold in both the 4×110-yard and 4×220 yd freestyle relays.

== Australian Olympic Committee ==
In 1989, Dickson was elected as the Australian Capital Territory's first representative on the board of the Australian Olympic Federation. He was a member of the 1996 Melbourne Olympic Games Bid. In 1993, Dickson became an inaugural life of the ACT Olympic Council.

== Employment ==
Dickson started as a journalist with the ABC in Perth and then became Channel Nine Perth's first sports director. He then spent 14 years in Europe including operating an import-export business in the South of France and then being appointed the Head Coach for French Swimming. In 1980, Dickson was appointed the inaugural Manager of the National Sports Centre in Canberra that became the home of the Australian Institute of Sport. He was the permanent Australian Capital Territory Tourism Commissioner from 1985 to 1988. In 1980, Dickson was appointed the inaugural Manager of the National Sports Centre in Canberra that was to become the home of the Australian Institute of Sport. He was the permanent Australian Capital Territory Tourism Commissioner from 1985 to 1988.

== Recognition ==
- Swimming Western Australia Sir Frank Beaurepaire Memorial Trophy in 1959/60, 1960/61, 1961/62 and 1964/65.
- Western Australian Sports Star of the Year in 1961, 1963 and 1966
- Australian Sports Medal in 2000
- Swimming Western Australia Hall of Fame in 2008
- Western Australian South West Hall of Fame

== See also ==
- List of Commonwealth Games medallists in swimming (men)
- List of Olympic medalists in swimming (men)
- World record progression 4 × 200 metres freestyle relay

== Bibliography ==
- Andrews, Malcolm (2000). Australia at the Olympic Games. Sydney, New South Wales: ABC Books. p. 132. ISBN 0-7333-0884-8.
