= Geoffrey Cutter =

British field hockey player (born 1934)

Personal information
- Born: 1 October 1934 (age 91) Newport, Wales
- Height: 173 cm (5 ft 8 in)
- Weight: 64 kg (141 lb)

Sport
- Sport: Field hockey
- Position: Right-wing
Senior career
Years	Team	Caps	Goals
1956	Old Bristolians	-	-
1956	Army	-	-
1957–1961	Winnington Park	-	-
1961–1964	Ben Rhydding	-	-
National team
Years	Team	Caps	Goals
–	Great Britain		-
–	Wales		-

Geoffrey Michael Cutter (born 1 October 1934) is a British field hockey player. He competed at the 1956 Summer Olympics and the 1964 Summer Olympics.

== Biography ==
Cutter played club hockey for Old Bristolians and represented Wales at national level.

In 1956, Cutter, a second lieutenant in the 2nd Battalion Royal Army Service Corps at the time, was called up to represent Great Britain at the 1956 Olympic Games in Melbourne. Unfortunately his Olympic experience ended early after he broke his ankle in the opening match.

Cutter joined Ben Rhydding Hockey Club and later represented Great Britain at the 1964 Olympic Games in Tokyo. He was one of two Welshmen, with Roger Sutton in the squad.

Cutter was the Great Britain hockey team coach during the 1968 Summer Olympics.
