= Richard Campion =

Richard Campion may refer to:

- Richard Campion (swimmer) (born 1941), English-born swimmer and swimming administrator in Australia
- Richard Campion (theatre director) (1923–2013), New Zealand theatre director
