= Tony Strahan =

Australian swimmer (born 1946)

Tony Strahan OAM
Personal information
- Full name: Anthony George Reginald Strahan
- Nationality: Australian
- Born: 1 January 1946 (age 80) Geelong, Victoria, Australia

Sport
- Sport: Swimming
- Strokes: Freestyle
- Club: Geelong Swimming Club
Medal record
Men's swimming
Representing Australia
British Empire and Commonwealth Games
Gold medal – first place	1962 Perth	4 × 220 yards freestyle relay

Anthony George Reginald Strahan (born 1 January 1946) is a retired Australian freestyle swimmer. At the 1962 British Empire and Commonwealth Games in Perth, Western Australia, Strahan won a gold medal in the 4 × 220 yards freestyle relay, along with Murray Rose, Bob Windle and Allan Wood.

Strahan was born in Geelong, Victoria, the son of Henry and Diana Strahan. He attended Newton State School, before completing secondary education at the Geelong College, also in Newtown.

Strahan is a decorated surf lifesaver. In June 2019, he was awarded with an Order of Australia Medal (OAM) for service to surf lifesaving.
