= Roger Sutton (field hockey) =

British hockey player

Personal information
- Born: 20 December 1936 (age 89) Brentford, London, England
- Height: 178 cm (5 ft 10 in)
- Weight: 72 kg (159 lb)

Sport
- Sport: Field hockey
Senior career
| Years | Team | Caps | Goals |
| 1957–1958 | Cliftonville | - | - |
| 1960–1966 | Beckenham | - | - |
National team
| Years | Team | Caps | Goals |
| – | Great Britain | | - |
| – | Wales | | - |

Roger Macklin Sutton (born 20 December 1936) is a British field hockey player. He competed in the men's tournament at the 1964 Summer Olympics.

== Biography ==
Sutton studied at Oxford University and played club hockey for Cliftonville Hockey Club before joining Beckenham Hockey Club. He played for Wales at international level.

He represented Great Britain at the 1964 Olympic Games in Tokyo. He was one of two Welshmen, with Geoffrey Cutter in the squad.
