= Riptide (Australian TV series) =

- Created by: Michael Noonan
- Starring: Ty Hardin
- Theme music composer: Tommy Tycho
- Countries of origin: Australia; United Kingdom; Bermuda
- No. of seasons: 1
- No. of episodes: 26

Production
- Executive producer: Guy Thayer
- Producer: Ralph Smart
- Running time: 49 minutes
- Production companies: Artransa; Associated British-Pathe; Trans-Pacific Enterprise

Original release
- Network: Seven Network (Australia)
- Release: 6 February 1969

Riptide is an Australian adventure television series, starring American actor Ty Hardin, which was first broadcast in 1969. The show featured a foreign lead actor and a foreign producer, similar in approach to the later series The Outsiders. Co-stars were Jonathan Sweet and Sue Costin, while guest roles featured Australian actors such as Tony Ward, Rowena Wallace, Michael Pate, Bill Hunter, Helen Morse, John Meillon, Norman Yemm, Chips Rafferty, and Jack Thompson. The series was filmed at Australian locations.

== Plot ==
The protagonist Moss Andrews (played by Ty Hardin, who had previously appeared in Bronco) is a once successful US-American businessman who took a sabbatical after his wife had died prematurely. The widower undertook a long sailing trip, hoping that experiencing pure nature would give him some peace of mind. In Australia, the beautiful environment helped him to pull himself together again and therefore he has decided to stay for the time being, operating a charter boat company along the eastern seaboard. However, he is frequently bothered by suspicious characters who try to follow through on hidden schemes. He always manages eventually to put paid to all looming menaces.

== Cast ==
=== Main/regular ===
- Ty Hardin as Moss Andrews
- Jonathan Sweet as Neal Winton
- Sue Costin as Judy Plenderleith

== Production ==
=== Development ===
The series was based on an idea by American Guy Thayer and developed by London-based Australian writer Michael Noonan who had worked with Thayer on The Flying Doctors. Noonan had helped create two earlier British-financed television shows with American stars set in Australia, The Flying Doctor and Whiplash. Noonan says Thayer's original pitch was about a show about a man wbo ran a charter boat on the Barrier Reef and was called Charter Boat with Oliver Reed to star. The show was announced in 1966 as Charter Boat.

Finance was raised from an Australian company, Artransa, and a British company, Associated British. (The series was officially a co-production between a Bermudan-based company of Thayer's, Trans Pacific Enterprises, and Artransa Park Studios, with copyright owed by Associated British Pathe, Amalgamated Television Services and Trans Pacific.) Noonan says the intention was that the series would be written by three Australian writers based in London under Noonan's supervision - Bruce Stewart, Tony Scott Veitch and Rex Rienits. They each wrote two episodes each but Associated British were rejected them and Robert Banks Stewart became story editor instead.

By November 1967 Leon Becker, manager of Artransa, reported that five Australians had submitted scripts: Bruce Stewart, Michael Noonan, Peter Yeldham, Rex Rienits and Anthony Scott Veitch. No script from an Australian-resident writer was used on the series. This led to a dispute with the Australian Writers Guild.

The lead role went to Ty Hardin.

The series was filmed in colour. Ty Hardin said: "We can make a Riptide episode here for $70,000. In the States it would cost $200,000."

Filming started 29 November 1967.

During the making of the series Hardin told a journalist, "I'm really a very humble man. Not a day goes by that I don't thank God for my looks, my stature and my talent."

Shooting was problematic. Several months in Ralph Smart was brought out to act as a producer. Among the things he did was sack the two co-stars.

== Reception ==
The series rated well in Australia. However the reception of the series did not meet the expectations of its producers. US-American broadcasters rejected the series and the enthusiasm of audiences in Australia and Europe was merely lukewarm. There was no second season for this TV show.

== Episode ==
1. Bound from California (5 February 1969). w Robert Bruce Stewart, p Ralph Smart d Peter Maxwell. Moss Andrews arrives on a boat from the USA, recovering from the death of his wife. He runs into an old friend and gets involved in a battle over tug boats. GS: Gordon Boyd, Pat Sullivan, Ron Graham, Fernande Glynn, John Gray. NB. This episode was the sixteenth episode filmed.
