= Bob Windle =

Australian swimmer, Olympic gold medallist, former world record-holder

Personal information
- Full name: Robert George Windle
- Nickname: Bob
- National team: Australia
- Born: 7 November 1944 (age 81) Waverley, New South Wales, Australia
- Height: 1.85 m (6 ft 1 in)
- Weight: 77 kg (170 lb)

Sport
- Sport: Swimming
- Strokes: Freestyle
- College team: Indiana University
Medal record
Men's swimming
Representing Australia
Olympic Games
Gold medal – first place	1964 Tokyo	1500 m freestyle
Silver medal – second place	1968 Mexico City	4×200 m freestyle
Bronze medal – third place	1964 Tokyo	4×100 m freestyle
Bronze medal – third place	1968 Mexico City	4×100 m freestyle
Commonwealth Games
Gold medal – first place	1966 Kingston	4×220 yd freestyle
Gold medal – first place	1966 Kingston	4×110 yd freestyle
Gold medal – first place	1966 Kingston	440 yd freestyle
Gold medal – first place	1962 Perth	4×220 yd freestyle
Silver medal – second place	1962 Perth	1650 yd freestyle
Bronze medal – third place	1962 Perth	440 yd freestyle

Robert George Windle (born 7 November 1944) is an Australian freestyle swimmer of the 1960s, who won four Olympic medals, including an individual gold medal. Windle won the 1500 m freestyle and took bronze in the 4 × 100 m freestyle relay at the 1964 Summer Olympics in Tokyo, and silver and bronze in the 4 × 200 m and 4 × 100 m freestyle relays respectively at the 1968 Summer Olympics. Known for his versatility, he is the only male swimmer to represent Australia at the Olympics in all freestyle distances from 100 m to 1500 m. During his career, Windle set six world records and won six Commonwealth Games gold medals. He won 19 Australian championships in all distances from 220 yd to 1650 yd.

Growing up in eastern Sydney, Windle was trained by Frank Guthrie from the age of 12. Windle's first major swimming competition was the 1960 Australian Championships. Aged 15, his second-place finish in the 1650 yd freestyle earned him a place on the team for the 1960 Summer Olympics in Rome. However, the Australian coaches only took him along to gain experience and he did not compete. He won his first national title in 1961—the 1650 yd freestyle—and claimed the 220–440–1650 yd treble in 1962. Windle made his international debut at the 1962 British Empire and Commonwealth Games in Perth, winning gold in the 4 × 220 yd freestyle and silver and bronze in the 1650 and 440 yd freestyle respectively. In 1963, he won four individual national titles, adding the 880 yd event to the successful defence of his three titles. He won three individual titles in 1964 and proceeded to the Tokyo Olympics where he was eliminated in the heats of the 400 m freestyle after attempting to save energy for the final. In response, Windle took an aggressive approach in the 1500 m and set Olympic records in the heats and final to win gold. He added a bronze in the 4 × 100 m freestyle relay.

After the Olympics, Windle enrolled at Indiana University, where he trained under Doc Counsilman. While in the United States, Windle converted to sprint swimming. He competed in the 1966 British Empire and Commonwealth Games in Kingston, Jamaica, winning the 440 yd freestyle, 4 × 110 yd and 4 × 220 yd freestyle relays, all in world-record times. He competed in his second Olympics in Mexico City in 1968, racing the 100 m and 200 m freestyle and the corresponding relays, having completed his transition to sprinting. He won a bronze and silver in the respective relays and retired after the games. In retirement, he worked for Allis-Chalmers in the United States, before being transferred to their Australian division.

== Early years ==
Born in Sydney on 7 November 1944, Windle grew up in the eastern Sydney suburb of Waverley. Windle and his sister Norma learnt to swim at nearby Bronte Beach. His family later relocated to Bexley North, and he swam for his school team at Marist College Kogarah. Windle was coached by Frank Guthrie at the Enfield pool from the age of 12. After a fortnight of training, he entered the district age group championships and won a place in the top three. From then on, he began training three or four times a week, and his father drove him to Enfield for morning training. By the age of 15, he was training every day.

A turning point for Windle was the 1960 Australian Championships; he came second in the 1650 yd freestyle behind John Konrads and was selected for the 1960 Summer Olympics in Rome. He dropped out of high school to attend a three-month training camp in Queensland with the Olympic swimming team. Windle did not swim in Rome; team officials merely wanted him to learn from the routine and atmosphere of Olympic swimming. On his return to Australia, he switched to the tutelage of Don Talbot, who also coached Konrads.

Talbot nicknamed Windle "the greyhound" because of his thin and angular build. As a result of Windle's small build, he took between 45 and 47 strokes to complete a lap, but fellow distance swimmer Murray Rose needed only 35 to 37 strokes. Talbot said that Windle was the most thinly built elite swimmer that he had trained, and had great trouble in trying to increase Windle's frame. Talbot motivated Windle and instilled him with a greater level of self belief. For his part, Windle responded by increasing his workload, and was regarded as Talbot's most diligent student. Windle trained with a determination that often saw him swim through others who were in his training lane. These collisions led to complaints by recreational swimmers that Windle was too aggressive. He often did twice as much pre-season training as the other swimmers in Talbot's squad. According to Talbot, Windle's weakness was that he was only capable of swimming in two ways, flat out or very slowly. Windle had trouble in pacing himself to conserve energy for later events. Talbot lamented to "never [being] astute enough to realise that he [Windle] didn't have the subtleties of pace that would have added to his armament as a swimmer".

== First national title and international medals ==
At the 1961 Australian Championships, Windle won the 1500 m in a time of 17 min 37.7 s to claim his first Australian title at the age of 16. However, his victory was overshadowed when his bathers partly fell off during the race. In the following year, Windle showed his versatility by winning the 220 yd, 440 yd and 1650 yd freestyle events, in times of 2 min 2.9 s, 4 min 25.0 s and 17 min 53.3 s respectively. He also anchored the New South Wales team to victory in the 4 × 220 yd freestyle relay. Selected for the 1962 British Empire and Commonwealth Games in Perth, he marked his international debut with silver and bronze in the 1650 yd and 440 yd freestyle respectively. Murray Rose, who had returned from competition in the United States college system, won both events. Rose won the 1650 yd event, finishing in 17 min 18.1 s, with Windle 26.4 s in arrears. In the 440 yd event, Rose finished in a time of 4 min 20.0 s, 3.1 s ahead of the third-placed Windle. Windle also won gold in the 4 × 220 yd freestyle relay, along with Rose, Allan Wood and Anthony Strahan, setting a world record in the process.

With Rose absent in the United States, Windle won the 220 yd, 440 yd, 880 yd and 1650 yd freestyle at the 1963 Australian Championships, in times of 2 min 2.8 s, 4 min 23.0 s, 9 min 10.5 s and 17 min 59.6 s respectively. His quest to sweep all of the freestyle events failed when David Dickson defeated him in a touch finish in the 110 yd race. The pair were neck and neck but Dickson judged the finishing touch on the wall better. Windle collected two more wins as part of the New South Wales team in the 4 × 220 yd and the 4 × 110 yd freestyle relays, anchoring both quartets.

Windle set world records in the 200 m and 220 yd freestyle in 1963, posting times of 2 min 0.3 s and 2 min 1.1 s respectively. He won three individual titles at the 1964 Australian Championships, the 200 m, 400 m and 1500 m freestyle in times of 2 min 0.0 s, 4 min 17.6 s and 17 min 9.4 s respectively. As it was an Olympic year, the competition was held over metric distances, in conformance with Olympic standards. Windle was a member of all three New South Wales relay teams as they swept the relay events, winning the 400 m and 800 m freestyle and 400 m medley relays.

== Olympic gold ==
Windle's performances qualified him for the 1964 Summer Olympics in Tokyo, where he was slated to swim four events: the 400 m and 1500 m freestyle and the 4 × 100 m and 4 × 200 m freestyle relays. Windle's first event was the 4 × 100 m freestyle relay, where he combined with Dickson, Peter Doak, and John Ryan to win Australia's heat in a time of 3 min 40.6 s, which lagged behind the United States' winning heat time by 1.8 s. Windle anchored the team as Australia came from second at the halfway point to win their heat. The Australians were the second fastest qualifier for the finals. However, the United States improved their time by a further 5.6 s in the final, but Australia could only improve their time to 3 min 39.1 s, leaving them third behind the Americans and Germans. Australia were in second place for the first two legs, until Germany moved into the silver medal position at the last change by 0.1 s. A distance swimmer, Windle could not keep up with his German anchorman counterpart, and Australia fell 1.9 s behind the silver medalists by the end of the race.

In the 400 m freestyle heats, Windle and Talbot made a misjudgement; in an attempt to conserve his energy for the final they decided that Windle should not go flat out, and Windle was four seconds slower than he was at the Australian Championships. Windle was one of the top seeds for the race, and Talbot advised him to swim hard in the first half of the race before slowing down. However, he swam too slowly and missed the final completely. Although he won his heat by seven seconds in a time of 4 min 21.6 s, he was the ninth fastest overall, so he missed the final by one position with a time deficit of 0.5 s. The slowest qualifier was Tsuyoshi Yamanaka, who had been prevented from withdrawing from the race by his coaches. On the other hand, the two other Australian representatives who he defeated at the national championships did make the final, including Wood, who went on to win bronze. Talbot said that the tactical error was mostly his responsibility and that he learnt a lot from it.

In the 1500 m, Talbot decided that Windle would attack from the outset and attempt to hang on in the latter stages of the race. They also worked on Windle's technique, curing his habit of dropping his elbow to a lower position when he was tired. Windle broke the Olympic record in the heats with a time of 17 min 15.9 s to qualify fastest for the final by more than six seconds. In the final, Windle repeated the strategy of sprinting from the start, leading throughout to lower his own Olympic record to 17 min 1.7 s and holding off American John Nelson by 1.3 s. Windle's tactics disrupted the raceplan of the Americans; Nelson and world record holder Roy Saari had planned to pace each other throughout the race, but ended up reacting to Windle instead of swimming their own race. As a result, Saari finished in seventh place, far outside his global standard.

Windle later combined with Wood, Ryan and Dickson in the 4 × 200 m freestyle relay final. Having rested their two individual medalists—Wood and Windle—in the heats, Australia struggled to fourth place and were the slowest qualifier for the final. In the decider, Australia were fourth when Windle dived in for the anchor leg, 3.7 s behind the third-placed Japan. Windle posted a time of 1 min 58.7 s, the sixth fastest split in the race and the fastest Australian leg by 3.0 s. Although he made up 1.8 s on the Japanese anchor swimmer, it was not enough and Australia finished fourth, 1.9 s out of the medals.

== US college career ==
After the Olympics, Windle enrolled at Indiana University—whose Indiana Hoosiers swimming team was coached by Doc Counsilman—on an athletic scholarship. He did so after getting advice from Australian teammate, Olympic gold medallist and Indiana student Kevin Berry. He studied business while competing for the university, where he switched his focus to shorter sprint distances. Windle did not enjoy as much success at short-course swimming in the United States as he did in long-course swimming. He cited the lack of enjoyment for switching to shorter distances, quipping "Why swim 30 laps for a gold, when you can get one for swimming two laps?" However, Windle enjoyed his time in the United States, approving of the additional emphasis on relays and team spirit and the social life that it entailed. Windle also enjoyed learning from Counsilman, who was regarded as an expert in mechanics, resulting in an improvement in his swimming technique.

Windle's performances in the United States for Indiana earned him selection for the 1966 Commonwealth Games in Kingston, Jamaica. He won the 440 yd freestyle in a world record time of 4 min 15.0 s, but with his focus now on the shorter distances, only managed fourth in the 1650 yd freestyle with a time of 17 min 49.2 s, 4% slower than his personal best for the distance. He won golds in the 4 × 110 yd freestyle relay with Ryan, Dickson and Michael Wenden and the 4 × 220 yd freestyle with Wenden, Dickson and Peter Reynolds. The times of 3 min 35.6 s and 7 min 59.5 s, respectively, were world records.

== International farewell ==
In 1967, Windle retired, but made a comeback to compete in the shorter distances after being persuaded by Talbot. In 1968, Windle anchored Indiana's 880 yd freestyle relay to victory at the National Collegiate Athletic Association Men's Swimming and Diving Championships, sealing what would be the first of six consecutive men's team titles for the university. He then competed in the Australian Championships for the first time in four years. Although he did not win any individual events, he was part of New South Wales' winning quartets in the 4 × 100 m and 4 × 200 m freestyle relays. Windle was appointed the captain of the men's Olympic swimming team, gaining selection for the 100 m and 200 m freestyle events and the respective freestyle relays. He was not selected for the 1500 m freestyle, ending the defence of his Olympic title before the team had reached Mexico City.

In the 100 m freestyle, Windle came second in his heat in a time of 54.8 s, making him the sixth fastest qualifier for the semifinals. He improved his time to 54.6 s in the semifinals, but this placed him only 11th and he missed the final by 0.5 s. In the 200 m freestyle, Windle came second in his heat behind Wenden and scraped into the final by 0.3 s as the seventh fastest qualifier. He improved his time by 0.1 s in the final to finish sixth in 2 min 0.9 s. Wenden won both events. After the 200 m final, Wenden lost consciousness due to exhaustion and sank underwater. Wenden was pulled from the water and saved after Windle noticed the incident.

In the 4 × 100 m freestyle, Windle combined with Wenden, Robert Cusack and Greg Rogers to win bronze behind the United States and the Soviet Union. Australia used the same team and swimming order in both the heats and finals, with Windle doing the third leg. Australia came second in their heat behind the United States and qualified third overall, and the Soviet Union were the second fastest. It was a similar story in the final; Australia were third at every change. Despite Wenden anchoring the Australians with the fastest split among all 32 swimmers in the race, the Australians missed the silver medal by just 0.5 s. In the 4 × 200 m freestyle relay, Windle won a silver along with Wenden, Rogers and Graham White. The quartet won their heat and qualified fastest, while the Americans qualified second with their second-choice team. However, using their full-strength team in the final, the Americans won by 1.4 s. Australia were 2.5 s behind at the halfway point of the race, but the Americans were able to hold on, despite the gains made by Windle and Wenden in the last two legs.

Windle retired after the Games, noting that "I have swum to that point when I could hardly lift myself out of the water. I have seen John Konrads to that point also. I would always give 110%. There is no substitute for hard and honest work". Windle was usually regarded as the fittest and hardest-working member of the Australian swimming team. In retirement, Windle stayed in the United States for a few more years, working for Allis-Chalmers, an agricultural equipment corporation. He returned home after being transferred to the Australian division of the firm's operations. Windle was inducted into the Sport Australia Hall of Fame in 1987 and the International Swimming Hall of Fame in 1990.

== See also ==
- List of members of the International Swimming Hall of Fame
- List of Commonwealth Games medallists in swimming (men)
- List of Olympic medalists in swimming (men)
- World record progression 200 metres freestyle
