= Rodney Clayden =

English swimmer

Personal information
- Nationality: British (English)
- Born: 1945 (age 80–81) York, England

Sport
- Sport: Swimming
- Event: Backstroke
- Club: York City SC
Medal record
Representing England
British Empire and Commonwealth Games
Bronze medal – third place	1962 Perth	4×110yd freestyle relay

Rodney John Clayden (born 1945), is a male former swimmer who competed for England.

== Biography ==
Clayden represented the England team at the 1962 British Empire and Commonwealth Games in Perth, Western Australia. He competed in the 110 and 220y backstroke and freestyle relay events, winning a bronze medal.

He was a member of the York City Swimming Club.
