= Jill Norfolk =

British swimmer

Personal information
- Nationality: British (English)
- Born: 15 February 1947 (age 79) London, England
- Height: 165 cm (5 ft 5 in)
- Weight: 61 kg (134 lb)

Sport
- Club: Stoke Newington SC

Jill Rosemary Norfolk (born 15 February 1947) is a British former swimmer who competed at the 1964 Summer Olympics.

== Biography ==
Norfolk represented the England team at the 1962 British Empire and Commonwealth Games in Perth, Western Australia. She competed in the 110 and 220 yards backstroke events.

During a Blackpool swim meet against Russia in April 1964 she broke the women's world record for the 110 yards backstroke in a time of 69.8 seconds.

At the 1964 Olympic Games in Tokyo she participated in the 100 metres backstroke and medley relay events.
