= Dorinda Fraser =

English swimmer

Personal information
- Nationality: British (English)
- Born: First quarter 1947 Gateshead, England
- Died: 17 June 2010 (aged 63) Mallorca, Spain

Sport
- Sport: Swimming
- Event: Breaststroke
- Club: Gateshead SC
Medal record
Swimming
Representing England
British Empire & Commonwealth Games
Bronze medal – third place	1962 Perth	110y breaststroke

Dorinda Fraser (1947 – 17 June 2010) was a female international swimmer who competed for England.

== Biography ==
Fraser represented the England team at the 1962 British Empire and Commonwealth Games in Perth, Western Australia. She competed in the 110 and 220 yards breaststroke events, winning a bronze medal.
