= Christopher Wilkinson (swimmer) =

British swimmer (born 1943)

Personal information
- Nationality: British (English)
- Born: Second quarter 1943 Stockport, Cheshire, England

Sport
- Sport: Swimming
- Event: Breaststroke
- Club: Stockport SC

Christopher Charles Wilkinson (born 1943) is a retired British breaststroke swimmer who competed at the British Empire and Commonwealth Games (now Commonwealth Games).

== Biography ==
Wilkinson represented the England team at the 1962 British Empire and Commonwealth Games in Perth, Western Australia. He competed in the 110 and 220 yards breaststroke events.

His younger sister is Diana Wilkinson.
