= Ian Blyth =

British swimmer

Personal information
- Nationality: British
- Born: 11 October 1942 (age 83) Dundee, Scotland
- Height: 182 cm (6 ft 0 in)
- Weight: 81 kg (179 lb)

Sport
- Sport: Swimming
- Club: Dundee Whitehall

Ian Blyth (born 11 October 1942) is a British former swimmer who competed at the 1960 Summer Olympics.

== Biography ==
At the 1960 Olympic Games in Rome he participated in the men's 200 metre butterfly event.

A postman by profession, he swam for Dundee Whitehall and won the British Swimming Championships in 1960, competing in the 200 metres butterfly competition.

He represented the 1962 Scottish Team at the 1962 British Empire and Commonwealth Games in Perth, Australia, participating in the butterfly, medley and relay events, reaching the finals of three events including the 4x110y medley relay, where the team consisting of Bob McGregor, Cleve Cowie and Andrew Harrower finished fourth.
