= Terry Glenville =

English swimmer

Personal information
- Nationality: British (English)
- Born: Fourth quarter 1943 Hull, England
- Died: 8 February 2021 (aged 77) Dove House Hospice, Hull, England

Sport
- Sport: Swimming
- Event: Butterfly / Medley
- Club: Hull Olympic SC
Medal record
Swimming
Representing England
British Empire & Commonwealth Games
Silver medal – second place	1962 Perth	440y medley relay

Terence William Glenville (17 December 1943 – 8 February 2021), was an international swimmer who competed for England.

== Biography ==
Glenville represented the England team at the 1962 British Empire and Commonwealth Games in Perth, Western Australia. He competed in the 110 and 220 yards butterfly and medley relay events, winning a silver medal.

He was a member of the Hull Swimming Club.

He was a well-respected teacher for many years at Hymers College (Junior School) in Hull, and also taught swimming at a variety of venues in the city. He was married to Pauline Glenville (née Hunt - died 4 February 2017), had two children (Katy and James), and four Grandchildren (Daisy, Lucy, Jacob and Amelia).
