= Andrew Harrower =

Scottish swimmer

Personal information
- Nationality: British (Scotland)
- Born: 20 May 1943 Scotland
- Died: 21 May 2023 (aged 80) Stirling, Scotland

Sport
- Sport: Swimming
- Event(s): Backstroke, Butterfly
- Club: Dunfermline Carnegie

Andrew David Burns Harrower (20 May 1943 – 21 May 2023) was a swimmer from Scotland, who represented Scotland at the British Empire Games (now Commonwealth Games).

== Biography ==
Harrower, born in 1943, was a member of the Dunfermline Carnegie Swimming Club and was named as a trialist for the 1960 Summer Olympics.

He represented the 1962 Scottish Team at the 1962 British Empire and Commonwealth Games in Perth, Australia, participating in the backstroke, medley and relay events, reaching the finals of four events, including the 4x110y medley relay, where the team consisting of Bob McGregor, Cleve Cowie and Ian Blyth finished fourth.

He was the Scottish backstroke championship but was also competent in the butterfly and studied at Edinburgh University after the games.

Harrower represented the Scotland team again at the 1966 British Empire and Commonwealth Games in Kingston, Jamaica, where he participated in butterfly events.
