= Linda McGill =

Australian swimmer (1945–2025)

Personal information
- Nickname: Linda Carol McGill
- National team: Australia
- Born: 17 December 1945
- Died: 30 July 2025 (aged 79) Robina, Queensland, Australia

Sport
- Sport: Swimming
- Strokes: Breaststroke, butterfly, medley
Medal record
Women's swimming
Representing Australia
Commonwealth Games
| Bronze medal – third place | 1962 Perth | 110 yd butterfly |
| Silver medal – second place | 1962 Perth | 440 yd individual medley |
| Gold medal – first place | 1962 Perth | 4×110 yd medley relay |

Linda Carol McGill (17 December 1945 – 30 July 2025), also known by her married name Linda Kruk, was an Australian competition swimmer noted both for achievements at the Commonwealth Games and in long-distance swimming. At age 30, McGill set a record for the fastest and only swim around Hong Kong Island which stood for over 40 years, and still holds the record for the fastest swim in a counterclockwise direction.

== Life and career ==
At the 1962 British Empire and Commonwealth Games, McGill won the bronze medal in the women's 110-yard butterfly, the silver medal in the women's 440-yard individual medley, and the gold medal in the 4×110-yard medley relay. In 1964, she competed in four events in the Tokyo Olympic Games, finishing fourth in the 400 metre medley. Later that year, she was banned by amateur swimming authorities for four years for alleged misbehavior at the games.

In 1965, McGill moved to London on a working holiday visa. During the northern hemisphere summer of 1965, she accepted a dare to swim the English Channel. Although she had represented her country as an Olympic swimmer the year before, she specialized in fairly short distances and had never swum more than one kilometer at a time before—the Channel, by contrast, is 35 km. Officials of the English Channel Association were appalled to learn that she was about to attempt the Channel swim with only a few weeks lunchtime training and no long distance or cold water experience. McGill, however, decided to go ahead with the swim, feeling in part that success might help vindicate her earlier ban from Olympic swimming. She completed the long distance swim, becoming the first Australian to swim the English Channel on 7 August 1965, swimming topless and posing topless for press photographs after the swim. On this swim, she finished in 11 hours, 12 minutes and missed setting a then-world women's record by just 11 minutes.

In an effort to beat the record, she formally petitioned for and was granted permission from the Channel Swimming Association to swim topless, in order to prevent the straps of her swimming costume from cutting into her shoulders, as they had done on previous long swims. In 1967, she beat the record with a time of just under 10 hours. On 23 May 1976, swimming topless most of the way, she became the first person to swim around Hong Kong Island, accomplishing this in 17 hours, 6 minutes. The swim, in a counterclockwise direction, was sponsored by Cathay Pacific and began and ended in Repulse Bay. McGill faced difficulties including jellyfish stings, pollution, raw sewage and dead pigs in the water, ships, and inclement weather. Starting five miles into her swim, she took off her bikini top and went topless to avoid chafing. Although official records aren't kept for Hong Kong swims, this swim established an unofficial record for either gender that stood for over 40 years. McGill's record was beaten on 11 November 2017 by Simon Holliday, who swam the distance in 12 hours, 32 minutes.

McGill lost her nose to skin cancer in 2005 and had reconstructive surgery several years later. She died from emphysema at the Robina Hospital, on 30 July 2025, at the age of 79.

== Swimming career highlights ==
- 1958 joined Forbes Carlyle's coaching
- 1960 joined Don Talbot's coaching
- 1961 Australian Swimming Championship, Brisbane: won the open national title
- 1962 Australian Swimming Championship, Brisbane: won the 440 yards individual medley, 110 yards butterfly, 2nd 220 yards breaststroke
- 1962 Perth Commonwealth Games - exhibition swim: won the medley relay with Dawn Fraser, Marguerithe Ruygrok and Pam Sargeant (world record)
- 1962 Perth Commonwealth Games: bronze medal in the 110 yards butterfly, silver in the 440 yards individual medley, gold in the 440 yards medley relay (world record).
- 1963 National titles: 5 records: 100m butterfly (Australian record), 200m butterfly (Australian record), 400m individual medley (Australian record), 200m individual medley (Australian record) and 200m breaststroke (Australian record)
- 1964 Tokyo Olympics: 5th in the individual medley (Australian record), competed in 200m breaststroke, 100m butterfly, 400m individual medley, 4 × 100 m medley relay
- 1964 Ceylon Swimming Association competition: achieved many records
- August 1965 English Channel France to England: completed her first crossing (first Australian 11 hours 12 minutes)
- July 1967 Sydney Harbour swim: broke the American record
- 1967 English Channel: completed her second crossing (13 hours 2 minutes)
- September 1967 English Channel: completed her third crossing (new women's world record 9 hours 59 minutes 56 seconds)
- New Year's Day 1968: she received the MBE (youngest Australian recipient)
- January 1968 Phillip Bay crossing: won the event (first person to swim 14 hours)
- 1968 Capri to Naples race, 29 km (first woman 9 hours 52 minutes)
- 1968 Lake Ontario, Canada (withdrew due to extreme cold)
- 1968 Traversee Internationale du Lac Saint-Jean, Canada 51 km: (12 hours 2 minutes 33 seconds)
- 1968 Lake Simone, Canada, 24 km
- 1968 Block Island to Rhode Island, USA, 32 km
- 1968 Brisbane to Moreton Island, Australia
- 1968 Townsville to Magnetic Island, Australia (first person to swim)
- 1968 Inducted into the International Marathon Swimming Hall of Fame
- May 1976 Hong Kong Island, 45 km: swam around island (first person to swim 17 hours 6 minutes)
- 1977 Swam from Saudi Arabia to Bahrain (first person to swim)
- 1977 Rabaul, New Guinea
- July 1983 Manhattan Island Marathon Swim, 45.8 km: the first Australian to swim around Manhattan Island (9 hours 10 minutes 55 seconds)
- August 1984 Manhattan Island Marathon Swim, 45.8 km: (8 hours 23 minutes 10 seconds)
- August 1986 Manhattan Island Marathon Swim, 45.8 km: (8 hours 48 minutes 16 seconds)
- 1989 World Masters Games, Rio de Janeiro, Brazil
- 2020 Inducted into the Australian Marathon Swimming Hall of Fame
