= John Ryan (swimmer) =

Australian swimmer

Personal information
- Full name: John Sydney Ryan
- Nickname: Foot
- National team: Australia
- Born: 3 June 1942 (age 84)

Sport
- Sport: Swimming
- Strokes: Freestyle
Medal record
Men's swimming
Representing Australia
Olympic Games
| Bronze medal – third place | 1964 Tokyo | 4×100 m freestyle relay |
British Empire and Commonwealth Games
| Gold medal – first place | 1966 Kingston | 4×110 yard freestyle relay |

John Sydney Ryan (born 3 June1942) is an Australian sprint freestyle swimmer of the 1960s, who won a bronze medal in the 4×100-metre freestyle relay at the 1964 Summer Olympics in Tokyo.

The West Australian combined with Bob Windle, David Dickson and Peter Doak to win Bronze in the 4 × 100 m freestyle relay, behind the United States and German teams, the first time this event had been contested at the Olympics. He also made the semifinals of the 100-metre freestyle. Ryan later took gold in the 4 × 100 m freestyle relayfreestyle relay at the 1966 Commonwealth Games in Kingston, Jamaica, and finished fourth in the 110-yard freestyle event.

He was educated at Wesley College in South Perth.

== See also ==
- List of Commonwealth Games medallists in swimming (men)
- List of Olympic medalists in swimming (men)
