= Peter Reynolds (swimmer) =

Australian swimmer

Personal information
- Full name: Peter Askin Reynolds
- National team: Australia
- Born: 2 January 1948
- Died: 1 May 2012 (aged 64)

Sport
- Sport: Swimming
- Strokes: Backstroke, freestyle, medley
Medal record
Men's swimming
Representing Australia
Olympic Games
Bronze medal – third place	1964 Tokyo	4××100 m medley relay
British Empire and Commonwealth Games
Gold medal – first place	1966 Kingston	110 yd backstroke
Gold medal – first place	1966 Kingston	220 yd backstroke
Gold medal – first place	1966 Kingston	440 yd medley
Gold medal – first place	1966 Kingston	4×220 yd freestyle

Peter Askin Reynolds (2 January 1948 – 1 May 2012) was a male Australian freestyle and medley swimmer of the 1960s.

== Swimming career ==
Reynolds won a bronze medal in the 4×100-metre medley relay at the 1964 Summer Olympics in Tokyo. Although he set multiple world records, Reynolds peaked between Olympics and was unable to capture an individual medal at Olympic level.

Making his international debut at the 1964 Tokyo Olympics, Reynolds reached the final of the 200-metre backstroke, where he finished last to American Jed Graef, who won in a world record time. He combined with Ian O'Brien, Kevin Berry and David Dickson to claim bronze in the 4×100-metre medley relay, behind the United States and German.

At the 1966 Commonwealth Games in Kingston, Jamaica, Reynolds was one of the dominant swimmers, winning four gold medals, three of them individually. He collected gold in the 110-yard and 220-yard backstroke and the 400-yard individual medley, beating Canadian Ralph Hutton, setting world records in the latter two events.

Reynolds then combined with Dickson, Michael Wenden and Bob Windle to set a world record in the 4×220-yard freestyle relay. Another gold in the 4×110-yard medley relay was lost after Reynolds, O'Brien, Wenden and Graham Dunn were disqualified after a careless early changeover; they had touched the wall far in front of the rest of the field.

This was Reynolds' final appearance on the international scene. Although he increased his tally of Australian Championships to 14 the following year, he failed to gain selection for the 1968 Summer Olympics in Mexico City. Despite being of Australian nationality he won the ASA National British Championships over the 220 yards backstroke and the 220 yards medley in 1967.

== See also ==
- List of Commonwealth Games medallists in swimming (men)
- List of Olympic medalists in swimming (men)
