= Cleve Cowie =

Scottish swimmer

Personal information
- Nationality: British (Scotland)
- Born: c.1941

Sport
- Sport: Swimming
- Event: Breaststroke
- Club: Gordonians SC

Cleveland Cowie (born c.1941) is a former swimmer from Scotland, who represented Scotland at the British Empire Games (now Commonwealth Games).

== Biography ==
Cowie, born in 1941, attended Robert Gordon's College and the University of Aberdeen.

He was a member of the Gordonians Swimming Club and represented Scotland at international level.

He represented the 1962 Scottish Team at the 1962 British Empire and Commonwealth Games in Perth, Australia, participating in the breaststroke and relay events, reaching the finals of two events, including the 4x110y medley relay, where the team consisting of Bob McGregor, Andrew Harrower and Ian Blyth finished fourth.

He announced his retirement from swimming in December 1962 to concentrate on a teaching career.
