= Margaret Austen =

English diver

Personal information
- Nationality: British (English)
- Born: First quarter 1947 Kenton, London, England

Sport
- Sport: Diving
- Event: Platform / Springboard
- Club: Isleworth Penguin
Medal record
Diving
Representing England
British Empire & Commonwealth Games
Silver medal – second place	1962 Perth	10m platform

Margaret Christine Austen (born 1947), is a female former diver who competed for England.

== Biography ==
As a 15-year-old, Austen won the British High-board Diving Championship which led to her selection for the Commonwealth Games.

Austen represented the England team at the 1962 British Empire and Commonwealth Games in Perth, Australia. She competed in the platform diving event, winning a silver medal. She also participated in the 3 metres springboard.

During 1963 she and a fellow diver saved a boy from drowning after jumping into rough seas on the North Shore at Blackpool.
