= Geoffrey Thwaites =

British swimmer

Personal information
- Born: 24 April 1947 (age 79)

Sport
- Sport: Swimming

Geoffrey Thwaites (born 24 April 1947) is a British former swimmer. He competed in two events at the 1964 Summer Olympics.
