= Kevin Berry =

Australian swimmer (1945–2006)

Kevin Berry OAM
Personal information
- Full name: Kevin John Berry
- National team: AUS
- Born: 10 April 1945 Sydney
- Died: 7 December 2006 (aged 61) Sydney
- Height: 1.72 m (5 ft 8 in)
- Weight: 71 kg (157 lb)

Sport
- Sport: Swimming
- Strokes: Butterfly, medley
- Coach: Eric Hayes, Don Talbot
Medal record
Men's swimming
Representing Australia
Olympic Games
Gold medal – first place	1964 Tokyo	200 m butterfly
Bronze medal – third place	1964 Tokyo	4×100 m medley relay
British Empire and Commonwealth Games
Gold medal – first place	1962 Perth	Men's 110 yd Butterfly
Gold medal – first place	1962 Perth	Men's 220 yd Butterfly
Gold medal – first place	1962 Perth	Men's 4× 110 yd Medley Relay

Kevin John Berry OAM (10 April 1945 – 7 December 2006) was an Australian butterfly swimmer of the 1960s who won the gold medal in the 200-metre butterfly at the 1964 Summer Olympics in Tokyo. He set twelve world records in his career.

After his retirement from swimming, he became the pictorial editor of The Sydney Morning Herald and later the head of ABC Sport.

== Early life and education ==
Berry, the second of seven children, was born in Sydney and grew up in the western suburb of Marrickville, in a family with no prior sporting background. His father Frederick had arrived in Australia in the 1920s and had worked as a bar manager to support the family. He was taught to swim by his elder sister Colleen along with his younger siblings at Botany Bay. His younger brother Paul was a promising youth swimmer who defeated dual Olympic gold medallist Michael Wenden, and later became a professional rugby league footballer. Berry was educated at De La Salle College, and represented the school in athletics and rugby league, with moderate success.

== Career ==
Berry joined the Pyrmont Club, which trained at Victoria Park Swimming Pool, under Eric Hayes, and swam from 1956 until 1958 as a freestyler, with reasonable age group success. In 1958 he won a butterfly race, and despite winning more races, Hayes did not think that he was suited to butterfly. Berry switched coaches to Don Talbot, training at Bankstown, New South Wales by the end of the year.

In 1959 at the under-14 New South Wales Championships, Berry came first, second and third in the breaststroke, backstroke and butterfly respectively. Talbot encouraged him, predicting that he would do well the following year. Berry's parents were surprised when Talbot told them at the end of the year that Berry had a chance of making the 1960 Summer Olympics team for Rome, even though he had never entered an Australian Championship before. At the end of the year, he came second to Neville Hayes, a fellow Talbot swimmer, defeating Harry Turner, who had been expected to be Australia's second butterflier at the Olympics.

At the New South Wales championships in January 1960 he came second to Hayes in both the 110-yard and 220-yard butterfly, and repeated this at the Australian Championships, earning himself Olympic selection at the age of 14. He was sent on a training camp with the Australian team to Townsville, Queensland to prepare for the Olympics. Arriving in Rome, Berry swam in the heats of the 4×100-metre medley relay, before being replaced by Hayes in the final, who combined with David Theile, Terry Gathercole and Geoff Shipton to claim silver behind the United States. Under the rules of the era, heat swimmers were not entitled to medals. In the 200-metre butterfly, Berry qualified fifth fastest, but came home in sixth in the final, six seconds behind the American winner Mike Troy. Hayes finished second. Troy, who was impressed by Berry, sent him an autographed postcard, implying that he could be the next Olympic champion.

In 1961 Hayes again won the State and National titles, relegating Berry to second. Berry also finished his high schooling that year, and had a disrupted preparation for an international meet at the end of the year against a Japanese team and the 1962 Commonwealth Games the following year. In the four bilateral meets at Brisbane, Sydney, Melbourne and Hobart, Berry managed to beat Hayes in the last race, making a psychological breakthrough. At the following New South Wales Championships, he broke both the 220-yard and 110-yard butterfly world records, breaking Hayes' dominance. He again lowered the 220-yard record at the Australian Championships in qualifying for the Commonwealth Games. At the Games in Perth, he set Commonwealth records in both events to record his first international victories, and then combined with Julian Carroll, Ian O'Brien and David Dickson to add a third gold in the 4×110-yard medley relay.

In 1963 Berry successfully defended both of his butterfly titles, and then made a European tour with the Australian team, and then passed the entry examinations to Indiana University, and moved to the United States on a swimming scholarship under Doc Counsilman. He was defeated in the US Championships that year by Carl Robie, who later captured his world records. Berry trained among high calibre swimmers at Indiana, as his teammates included Tom Stock, Chet Jastremski and Ted Stickles, holders of every backstroke, breaststroke and medley world record respectively.

In 1964 Berry returned to Australia to qualify for the 1964 Summer Olympics in Tokyo, Japan, breaking world records in both the 100-metre and 200-metre butterfly. Due to financial difficulties, he took a job as a petrol station attendant, and washing dishes for a steakhouse. In one case, the Australian team were hosted for a reception at the steakhouse meaning that he had to prepare and clean up despite being one of the guests. Berry attended a training camp in Ayr, Queensland under Talbot, who was the national head coach. During the week before the 200-metre event in Tokyo, Berry, the favourite for the gold medal, swam an extremely slow time trial during practice, in the view of opposition swimmers, leaving doubts in Talbot's mind. Robie broke the Olympic record in both the heat and semi-final. In the final, Berry was one of only two swimmers to have had previous Olympic experience and decided to deliberately false start to unsettle his opponents. He then set a time of 2:06.6, 0.3 of a second faster than his previous world record to claim gold. He later combined with Dickson, O'Brien and Peter Reynolds to claim bronze in the 4×100-metre medley relay.

Berry returned to the United States, but was unable to match his previous form, and exchanged regular wins and defeats with Robie, who swam for the University of Michigan. He was selected for the 1966 Commonwealth Games in Kingston, Jamaica, but withdrew after his father's death and returned to Australia. He retired the following year and married, but continued his university education, initially studying business, but later switching to radio and television, and then photography. He worked as a photographer for two years in the United States before switching to The Sydney Morning Herald in Australia, where he later became the Pictorial Editor. He served as the ABC head of sport from 1985 until 1987, before starting his own private sports business. He was inducted into the International Swimming Hall of Fame as an "Honor Swimmer" in 1980.

== See also ==
- List of members of the International Swimming Hall of Fame
- List of Commonwealth Games medallists in swimming (men)
- List of Olympic medalists in swimming (men)
- World record progression 200 metres butterfly

== Bibliography ==
- Andrews, Malcolm (2000). Australia at the Olympic Games. Sydney, New South Wales: ABC Books. pp. 147–148. ISBN 0-7333-0884-8.
- Howell, Max (1986). Aussie Gold. Albion, Queensland: Brooks Waterloo. pp. 167–171. ISBN 0-86440-680-0.

Records
Preceded by Carl Robie	Men's 200-metre butterfly world record holder (long course); 20 February 1962 – 11 August 1962	Succeeded by Carl Robie
Preceded by Carl Robie	Men's 200-metre butterfly world record holder (long course); 23 October 1962 – 18 March 1963	Succeeded by Carl Robie
Preceded by Carl Robie	Men's 200-metre butterfly world record holder (long course); 29 March 1964 – 26 July 1967	Succeeded by Mark Spitz
