= John Martin-Dye =

British swimmer (1940–2022)

Personal information
- Nationality: British (English)
- Born: 21 May 1940 Shepherd's Bush, London, England
- Died: 31 December 2022 (aged 82)
- Height: 1.76 m (5 ft 9 in)
- Weight: 77 kg (170 lb)

Sport
- Sport: Swimming
- Club: Penguin Swimming Club
Medal record
Representing Great Britain
European Championships
Silver medal – second place	1962 Leipzig	4×100 m freestyle
Representing England
British Empire & Commonwealth Games
Bronze medal – third place	1962 Perth	440y freestyle relay
Bronze medal – third place	1962 Perth	880y freestyle relay
Bronze medal – third place	1966 Kingston	440y freestyle relay

John Martin-Dye (21 May 1940 – 31 December 2022) was a British swimmer.

== Early life ==
John Martin-Dye was born on 21 May 1940 in Shepherd's Bush. He was educated at Coverdale Junior School and Sloane Grammar School.

== Swimming career ==
Martin-Dye won a silver medal in the 4 × 100 m freestyle relay at the 1962 European Aquatics Championships. He competed in four freestyle events at the 1960 and 1964 Summer Olympics; his best achievements were fourth place in the 4 × 200 m relay in 1960 and seventh place in the 4 × 100 m relay in 1964. The fourth place in 1960 was good enough for a new European record.

He represented the England team and won two bronze medals in the 440 yards freestyle relay and the 880 yards freestyle relay, at the 1962 British Empire and Commonwealth Games in Perth, Western Australia.

Four years later he won another bronze medal for the England team in the 440 yards freestyle relay, at the 1966 British Empire and Commonwealth Games in Kingston, Jamaica.

He won the 1961 ASA British National Championship 110 yards freestyle title, the 220 yards freestyle title, was three times winner of the 440 Yards freestyle (1960, 1961, 1963) and the 1963 mile champion.

== Water polo ==
He started swimming in 1948 at Penguin Swimming Club in Shepherd's Bush. He was not only a swimmer, but also competed for Great Britain in water polo. Around 1966 he moved to Watford where he coaches the local water polo team. His youngest son Graham is also a swimmer and water polo player; he competed in Australia, but in 2012 was a captain of the Watford polo team.

== Death ==
Martin-Dye died on 31 December 2022, at the age of 82.

== See also ==
- List of Commonwealth Games medallists in swimming (men)
