= Marguerite Ruygrok =

Australian swimmer

Personal information
- Born: 3 June 1947 (age 79)

Sport
- Sport: Swimming
- Strokes: Breaststroke
Medal record
Women's swimming
Representing Australia
British Empire and Commonwealth Games
Gold medal – first place	1962 Perth	4×110 yd medley relay

Marguerite Isabelle Ruygrok (born 3 June 1947) is an Australian former breaststroke swimmer. She competed in two events at the 1964 Summer Olympics.
