= Aldy Meinhardt =

Personal information
- Born: Aldwin Walter Meinhardt

Sport
- Country: Canada
- Sport: Swimming
- Event: Freestyle / Butterfly
Medal record
Commonwealth Games
Silver medal – second place	1962 Perth	4×110 y freestyle
Silver medal – second place	1962 Perth	4×220 y freestyle relay
Bronze medal – third place	1962 Perth	110 y butterfly
Bronze medal – third place	1962 Perth	4×110 y medley
Pan American Games
Silver medal – second place	1963 São Paulo	4×200 m freestyle

Aldwin Walter Meinhardt is a Canadian former swimmer of the 1960s who specialised in the freestyle and butterfly. He was a Commonwealth Games and Pan American Games medalist.

Meinhardt, who is of Austrian descent, swam for the Vancouver Amateur Swim Club and was an All-American on the University of Washington swim team. He was the first Canadian to swim the 100 metre butterfly in under one minute and was also a national record holder in freestyle. In 1964 he briefly held Canada's 100 yard freestyle and 200 yard butterfly records, only to have them both bettered by Daniel Sherry later in the same competition.
