= Linda Amos =

British swimmer (1946–2026)

Personal information
- Born: 22 June 1946 Portsmouth, England
- Died: 8 June 2026 (aged 79) Taunton, England
- Height: 1.73 m (5 ft 8 in)
- Weight: 73 kg (161 lb; 11.5 st)

Sport
- Sport: Swimming
- Strokes: Freestyle
- Club: Portsmouth Northsea SC
Medal record
Women's swimming
Representing Great Britain
European Championships
Silver medal – second place	1962 Leipzig	4×100 m freestyle
Representing England
Commonwealth Games
Bronze medal – third place	1962 Perth	4×110 yd freestyle

Linda Amos (22 June 1946 – 8 June 2026), later known by her married name Linda Skirton, was a British competitive swimmer and freestyle specialist who represented Great Britain in the Olympics and European championships, and swam for England in the Commonwealth Games.

== Biography ==
Linda Amos was born in Portsmouth, England on 22 June 1946. She won a silver medal in the 4×100-metre freestyle relay as a member of the second-place British women's team at the 1962 European Aquatics Championships,

Amos represented the England team at the 1962 British Empire and Commonwealth Games in Perth, Western Australia. She competed in the 110 and 440 yards freestyle and the relay event, winning a bronze medal.

She also competed in the preliminary heats of the women's 100-metre freestyle at the 1964 Summer Olympics in Tokyo.

After retiring from competition swimming, she moved into coaching, and coached at junior level at Millfield Preparatory School for many years, until moving onwards to Somerset County Council in 2022. During her time at Millfield, she coached multiple Olympians and several Olympic medalists.

Amos died on 8 June 2026, aged 79.
