= Thomas Dinsley =

Canadian diver (born 1941)

Tom Dinsley
Personal information
- Full name: Thomas Edward Dinsley
- Born: 25 June 1941 (age 85) Regina, Saskatchewan, Canada
- Height: 166 cm (5 ft 5 in)
- Weight: 64 kg (141 lb)
Medal record
Men's diving
Representing Canada
British Empire and Commonwealth Games
Silver medal – second place	1962 Perth	3m springboard
Pan American Games
Gold medal – first place	1963 São Paulo	3m springboard

Thomas Edward Dinsley (born 25 June 1941) is a Canadian former diver, born in Regina, Saskatchewan, who competed in the 1964 Summer Olympics.
