= Liz Long =

British swimmer (born 1946)

Personal information
- Nationality: British (English)
- Born: 30 July 1946 (age 79) Ilford, London, England
- Height: 163 cm (5 ft 4 in)
- Weight: 60 kg (132 lb)

Sport
- Sport: Swimming
- Event: freestyle
- Club: Ilford Swimming Club
Medal record
Swimming
Representing England
British Empire & Commonwealth Games
Bronze medal – third place	1962 Perth	440y freestyle
Bronze medal – third place	1962 Perth	440y freestyle relay

Elizabeth "Liz" Carole Long (born 30 July 1946) is a British former swimmer. She competed in three events at the 1964 Summer Olympics.

== Biography ==
Long represented England and won two bronze medals in 440 yards individual freestyle and 440 yards freestyle relay, at the 1962 British Empire and Commonwealth Games in Perth, Western Australia.

Four years later she participated again for the England team at the 1966 British Empire and Commonwealth Games in Kingston, Jamaica, where she reached the final of the 440 yards individual freestyle event.

She also won the 1964 and 1965 ASA National Championship 220 yards freestyle title and is a four times winner of the 440 yards freestyle title (1960 and 1962–1965).
