= Michael Cowley (cyclist) =

British cyclist

Personal information
- Born: 8 November 1941 (age 84) Cumbria, England

Cycling career
- Sport: Cycling

Michael Cowley (born 8 November 1941) is a former British cyclist. He competed in the individual road race and team time trial events at the 1964 Summer Olympics.
