= Alex Alexander (swimmer) =

Australian swimmer (born 1945)

Personal information
- Full name: Fleming Alexander
- Nickname: "Alex"
- National team: Australia
- Born: 16 April 1945 (age 81) New South Wales

Sport
- Sport: Swimming
- Strokes: Medley
Medal record
Swimming
Representing Australia
British Empire and Commonwealth Games
Gold medal – first place	1962 Perth	Men's 440 yd Individual Medley

Fleming "Alex" Alexander (born 16 April 1945) is a former competition swimmer who represented Australia at the 1964 Summer Olympics in Tokyo. Alexander competed in the preliminary heats of the 400-metre individual medley, but did not advance; his time of 5:10.8 was the 16th-best at the Tokyo Olympics.

== See also ==
- List of Commonwealth Games medallists in swimming (men)
