= Graham Deuble =

Australian diver

Personal information
- Full name: Graham Norman Deuble
- Nationality: Australian
- Born: 24 December 1943 (age 82) Warwick, Queensland, Australia
- Died: 2006

Sport
- Sport: Diving
Medal record
Diving
Representing Australia
British Empire and Commonwealth Games
Silver medal – second place	1962 Perth	Men's 10m Platform

Graham Norman Deuble (born 24 December 1943) is an Australian diver. He competed in the men's 3 metre springboard event at the 1960 Summer Olympics.
