= John Oravainen =

Australian swimmer

Personal information
- Born: 17 December 1943 (age 82)

Sport
- Sport: Swimming
- Strokes: breaststroke, medley
Medal record
British Empire and Commonwealth Games
Silver medal – second place	1962 Perth	Men's 440 yd Individual Medley

John Verikko Oravainen (born 17 December 1943) is an Australian former swimmer. He competed in two events at the 1964 Summer Olympics.
