= Sylvia Lewis (swimmer) =

British swimmer

Personal information
- Nationality: Britiash (English)
- Born: 23 December 1941 (age 84) Middlesex, England
- Height: 175 cm (5 ft 9 in)
- Weight: 60 kg (132 lb)

Sport
- Sport: Swimming
- Strokes: Backstroke
- Club: Hounslow SC
Medal record
Swimming
Representing England
British Empire & Commonwealth Games
Silver medal – second place	1962 Perth	220y backstroke
Bronze medal – third place	1962 Perth	110y backstroke

Sylvia Anne Lewis (born 23 December 1941) is a British former swimmer. She competed at the 1960 Summer Olympics and the 1964 Summer Olympics.

== Biography ==
In May 1958 she took part in the Empire Games trials in Blackpool and subsequently represented the English team at the 1958 British Empire and Commonwealth Games in Cardiff, Wales, where she competed in the 110 yards backstroke event.

Four years later she won a silver medal in the 220 yards backstroke and a bronze medal in the 110 yards backstroke at the 1962 British Empire and Commonwealth Games in Perth, Western Australia.
