= Peter Kendrew =

English swimmer (born 1940)

Personal information
- National team: British (English)
- Born: 25 April 1940 (age 86) York, England
- Weight: 70 kg (150 lb; 11 st)

Sport
- Sport: Swimming
- Strokes: Freestyle
- Club: York City Baths Club
Medal record
Men's swimming
Representing England
Commonwealth Games
Silver medal – second place	1962 Perth	4×110 yd medley
Bronze medal – third place	1962 Perth	4×110 yd freestyle
Bronze medal – third place	1962 Perth	4×220 yd freestyle
Representing Great Britain
European Championships
Silver medal – second place	1962 Leipzig	4×100 m freestyle

Peter Kendrew (born 25 April 1940) is a male English former competition swimmer.

== Biography ==
In May 1958 he took part in the Empire Games trials in Blackpool and subsequently represented the English team at the 1958 British Empire and Commonwealth Games in Cardiff, Wales, where he competed in the 110y freestyle event.

He competed for Great Britain in the Olympics and European championships. Kendrew won a silver medal in the 4×100-metre freestyle relay at the 1962 European Aquatics Championships. The British relay team of which he was a member finished seventh in the same event at the 1964 Summer Olympics in Tokyo.

Kendrew represented the England team at the 1962 British Empire and Commonwealth Games in Perth, Western Australia. He competed in the swimming events, winning three bronze medals.

In the 2000s, he was still competing in the masters category.

== See also ==
- List of Commonwealth Games medallists in swimming (men)
