= Susan Knight =

Australian diver

Personal information
- Born: 23 March 1942 Sydney, New South Wales
- Died: 29 May 2009 (aged 67)
- Height: 1.63 m (5 ft 4 in)

Sport
- Country: Australia
- Event(s): 3m springboard, 10m platform
Medal record
Representing Australia
Women's Diving
British Empire and Commonwealth Games
Gold medal – first place	1962 Perth	3m springboard
Gold medal – first place	1962 Perth	10m platform
Bronze medal – third place	1966 Kingston	3m springboard

Susan Margaret Knight (23 March 1942 – 29 May 2009) was an Australian diver who competed in the 1960 Summer Olympics and in the 1964 Summer Olympics.
