= Sandra Keen =

British swimmer (born 1947)

Personal information
- Nationality: British (English)
- Born: 13 August 1947 (age 78)
- Height: 170 cm (5 ft 7 in)
- Weight: 70 kg (154 lb)

Sport
- Club: Heston SC, London
Medal record
Swimming
Representing England
British Empire & Commonwealth Games
Bronze medal – third place	1962 Perth	440y freestyle relay

Alexandra "Sandra" Keen (born 13 August 1947) is a British former swimmer who competed at the 1964 Summer Olympics.

== Biography ==
Keen represented the England team at the 1962 British Empire and Commonwealth Games in Perth, Western Australia. She competed in the 110 yards freestyle and relay events, winning a bronze medal.

At the 1964 Olympic Games in Tokyo, Keen participated in the 100 metres freestyle and the freestyle relay events.

She swam for the Heston Swimming Club in London.
