= Jacqueline Enfield =

British swimmer (born 1947)

Jackie Enfield
Personal information
- Nationality: British (English)
- Born: 19 September 1947 (age 79) Northampton, England
- Height: 162 cm (5 ft 4 in)
- Weight: 55 kg (121 lb)

Sport
- Sport: Swimming
- Strokes: Breaststroke
- Club: Northampton ASC
Medal record
Swimming
Representing England
British Empire & Commonwealth Games
Silver medal – second place	1962 Perth	220y breaststroke

Jacqueline Ida Enfield (born 19 September 1947) married name Gould is a British former swimmer who competed at the 1964 Summer Olympics.

== Biography ==
Enfield represented the England team at the 1962 British Empire and Commonwealth Games in Perth, Western Australia. She competed in the 110 and 220 yards breaststroke events, winning a silver medal in the latter event behind fellow British swimmer Anita Lonsbrough.

At the 1964 Olympic Games in Tokyo, she participated in the women's 200 metre breaststroke event.

== See also ==
- Elizabeth Church
