= Neil Nicholson (swimmer) =

British swimmer (born 1945)

Personal information
- Nationality: British (English)
- Born: 19 January 1945 (age 81) Gateshead, England
- Height: 175 cm (5 ft 9 in)
- Weight: 75 kg (165 lb)

Sport
- Club: Gateshead & Wickham ASC
Medal record
Swimming
Representing England
British Empire & Commonwealth Games
Silver medal – second place	1962 Perth	440y medley relay
Bronze medal – third place	1962 Perth	220y breaststroke

Neil Nicholson (born 19 January 1945) is a British former swimmer who competed at the 1964 Summer Olympics.

== Biography ==
Nicholson represented the England team at the 1962 British Empire and Commonwealth Games in Perth, Western Australia. He competed in the 110 and 220 yards breaststroke and medley relay events, winning a silver and a bronze medal.

At the ASA National British Championships he won the 220 yards breaststroke title in 1963 and one year later won the 110 yards breaststroke title.

At the 1964 Olympic Games he participated in two events.
