= Brian Jenkins (swimmer) =

English competitive swimmer (1943–2017)

Personal information
- Born: 20 June 1943 Bridgend, Wales
- Died: 24 December 2017 (aged 74) Swindon, England
- Height: 1.73 m (5 ft 8 in)
- Weight: 79 kg (174 lb; 12.4 st)

Sport
- Sport: Swimming
- Strokes: Butterfly
- Club: Swindon Dolphin SC
Medal record
Men's swimming
Representing Great Britain
European Championships
Silver medal – second place	1962 Leipzig	200 m butterfly

Brian Jenkins (20 June 1943 – 24 December 2017) was a British competitive swimmer.

== Swimming career ==
Jenkins represented Great Britain in the Olympics and European championships. Jenkins won a silver medal in the 200-metre butterfly at the 1962 European Aquatics Championships. He also competed in two events at the 1964 Summer Olympics in Tokyo, and finished eighth in the 4×100-metre medley relay.

He represented the 1962 Welsh team at the 1962 British Empire and Commonwealth Games in Perth, Australia, where he participated in the butterfly and medley events.

At the ASA National British Championships he won the 220 yards butterfly title in 1961, 1962 and 1963. He also won the 200 metres medley title in 1971 and 1973 and the 440 yards medley title in 1963.

== Personal life and death ==
Jenkins was accompanied at competition by his long-time girlfriend Gillian; they married in 1964. After that, he retired from senior swimming and worked as a plumber at Tamar Services. Later he competed in the masters category and won a national title in 1970.

Jenkins died in Swindon on 24 December 2017, at the age of 74.
