= William Wood (diver) =

English diver

Billy Wood
Personal information
- Nationality: British (English)
- Born: 9 June 1946 Southport, Lancashire, England
- Died: October 2000 (aged 54) Bournemouth, Dorset, England
- Height: 160 cm (5 ft 3 in)
- Weight: 58 kg (128 lb)

Sport
- Sport: Diving
- Event: Platform
- Club: Highgate Diving Club

William Ralph Wood (9 June 1946 – October 2000) was a male diver who competed for England. He competed in the 1964 Summer Olympics.

== Biography ==
Wood represented the England team at the 1962 British Empire and Commonwealth Games in Perth, Australia. He competed in the 1o metres platform event, finishing just outside the medals in fourth place.

At the 1964 Olympic Games in Tokyo, he participated in the platform event.
