= Ernie Meissner =

Canadian diver (1937–2008)

Personal information
- Full name: Ernest Meissner
- Nationality: Canadian
- Born: 29 May 1937 Belgrade, Yugoslavia
- Died: 26 September 2008 (aged 71)

Sport
- Sport: Diving
Medal record
Representing Canada
British Empire and Commonwealth Games
Bronze medal – third place	1962 Perth	3m springboard

Ernest Meissner (29 May 1937 – 26 September 2008) was a Canadian diver. He competed in two events at the 1960 Summer Olympics.
