= Marilyn Sidelsky =

Rhodesian swimmer (born 1948)

Personal information
- Born: 29 April 1948 (age 78)

Sport
- Sport: Swimming

Marilyn Alison Sidelsky (born 29 April 1948) is a Rhodesian former swimmer. She competed in two events at the 1964 Summer Olympics.
