= Tony Kitcher =

English diver

Personal information
- Nationality: British (English)
- Born: 18 March 1941 (age 85) Isle of Wight, England
- Height: 175 cm (5 ft 9 in)
- Weight: 74 kg (163 lb)

Sport
- Sport: Diving
- Event: Platform
- Club: City of Southampton SC
Medal record
Diving
Representing England
British Empire & Commonwealth Games
Bronze medal – third place	1962 Perth	10m platform

Anthony Albert William Kitcher (born 18 March 1941), is a British former diver who competed for England in the 1964 Summer Olympics.

== Biography ==
Kitcher represented the England team at the 1962 British Empire and Commonwealth Games in Perth, Australia. He competed in the 10 metres platform event, winning a bronze medal.

At the 1964 Olympic Games in Tokyo, he participated in the platform event.
