= Glenda Phillips =

British swimmer

Personal information
- Nationality: British (Welsh)
- Born: 12 May 1945 (age 81) Newport, Wales
- Height: 169 cm (5 ft 7 in)
- Weight: 70 kg (154 lb)

Sport
- Sport: Swimming
- Strokes: Butterfly, breaststroke, freestyle
- Club: Swansea Swimming Club

Glenda May Phillips (born 12 May 1945) is a former swimmer from Wales, who competed at the 1964 Summer Olympics.

== Biography ==
Phillips represented the 1962 Welsh team at the 1962 British Empire and Commonwealth Games in Perth, Australia, where she participated in the breaststroke, butterfly and freestyle events.

At the 1964 Olympic Games in Tokyo, Phillips participated in the women's 100 metre butterfly.

Phillips went to her second Commonwealth Games in Kingston, Jamaica, competing for the 1966 Welsh team in the butterfly events.
