= Alan Robertson (swimmer) =

New Zealand swimmer

Medal record

Men's swimming

Representing New Zealand

British Empire and Commonwealth Games
Bronze medal – third place	1962 Perth	220 yards Backstroke

Alan Robertson is a former swimming representative from New Zealand.

At the 1962 British Empire and Commonwealth Games he won the bronze medal in the men's 220 yards backstroke. He placed 5th in the 100 yards backstroke.

== See also ==
- List of Commonwealth Games medallists in swimming (men)
