= Richard Campion (swimmer) =

British swimmer, and Australian sports administrator (born 1941)

Personal information
- Nationality: British (English)
- Born: 11 March 1941 (age 85) Long Melford, England
- Height: 1.70 m (5 ft 7 in)
- Weight: 73 kg (161 lb)

Sport
- Sport: Swimming
- Strokes: Butterfly, Freestyle
- Club: Stoke Newington SC
Medal record
Men's swimming
Representing England
British Empire & Commonwealth Games
Bronze medal – third place	1962 Perth	880y freestyle relay
Representing Great Britain
European Championships
Bronze medal – third place	1962 Leipzig	1500 m freestyle

Richard Campion (born 11 March 1941) is an English-born former competition swimmer who represented Great Britain in the Olympics and European championships and England at the Commonwealth Games. He later became a respected Australian swimming administrator.

== Swimming career ==
In May 1958 he took part in the Empire Games trials in Blackpool and subsequently represented the English team at the 1958 British Empire and Commonwealth Games in Cardiff, Wales, where he competed in the 220 yards butterfly event.

He won a bronze medal in the 880-yard freestyle relay at the 1962 British Empire and Commonwealth Games in Perth, Western Australia. He also won a bronze medal in the 1500-metre freestyle at the 1962 European Aquatics Championships.

He also took part in three freestyle events at the 1960 Summer Olympics; his best Olympic achievement was fourth place in the 4×200-metre relay, setting a new European record.

He won the 1962 ASA National Championship 440 yards freestyle title, the 1961 and 1962 mile titles. and the 220 yards butterfly title in 1957.

== Open water ==
Since 1967, he has been promoting open-water swimming; around that time, he also moved from the United Kingdom to Australia. He took part in several international competitions in 1975 and 1976 and won the 1976 Australian Open Water Swimming Championships. The same year, he was elected president of the now-defunct World Professional Marathon Swimming Federation. Between 1977 and 1979, he was the president of the Australian Marathon Swimming Federation and a member of the Australian Open Water Swimming Committee from 1988 to 2001.

He wrote the open water swimming handler and trainer's manual, which was adopted by the Australian Swimming Federation, and organised the 1999 Pan Pacific Open Water Championships. Between 1989 and 1998, he was the national open water swimming coach. He organised the Australian Swimming 16-kilometre Grand Prix Series and the 93-kilometre four-person relay from Malta to Sicily in 1996.

== Awards ==
In 2010, he was inducted into the International Marathon Swimming Hall of Fame as a distinguished Australian swimming administrator. During that year, he was still competing in masters swimming.

== See also ==
- List of Commonwealth Games medallists in swimming (men)
