= Peter Phelps (swimmer) =

Australian swimmer

Personal information
- Full name: Peter Phelps
- National team: Australia
- Born: 28 March 1945 (age 81)

Sport
- Sport: Swimming
- Strokes: Freestyle
Medal record
Men's swimming
Representing Australia
Commonwealth Games
Gold medal – first place	1962 Perth	4×110 yd freestyle

Peter Phelps (born 28 March 1945) is a former competition swimmer who represented Australia at the 1964 Summer Olympics in Tokyo. Phelps competed in the preliminary heats of the men's 100-metre freestyle event, finishing with a time of 56.1 seconds. He previously anchored the Australian gold medal team in the 4×110-yard freestyle relay at the 1962 British Empire and Commonwealth Games in Perth.

Phelps worked in the printing industry for many years in Sydney, before retiring in mid-2012.

== See also ==
- List of Commonwealth Games medallists in swimming (men)
