= William Burton (swimmer) =

Australian swimmer (born 1941)

Personal information
- Born: 15 September 1941 (age 84) Bowen, Queensland, Australia

Sport
- Sport: Swimming
Medal record
British Empire and Commonwealth Games
Silver medal – second place	1962 Perth	Men's 110 yd breaststroke
Silver medal – second place	1962 Perth	Men's 220 yd breaststroke

William Burton (born 15 September 1941) is an Australian former swimmer. He competed in two events at the 1960 Summer Olympics.
