= Mary-Anne Cotterill =

English swimmer (born 1945)

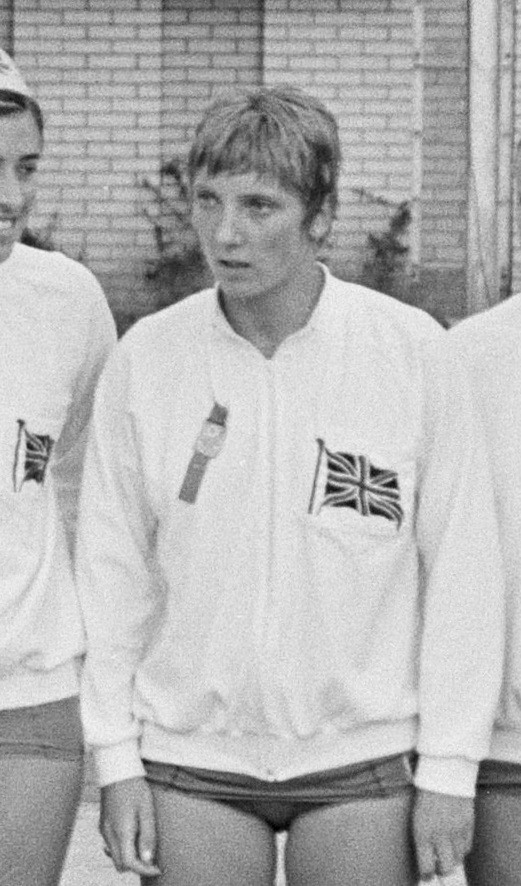
- Mary-Anne Cotterill in 1966

Personal information
- Born: 16 October 1945 (age 80) Maidstone, England
- Height: 1.68 m (5 ft 6 in)
- Weight: 63 kg (139 lb)

Sport
- Sport: Swimming
- Club: Watford Swimming Club
Medal record
Representing Great Britain
European Championships
Bronze medal – third place	1962 Leipzig	4×100 m medley
Bronze medal – third place	1966 Utrecht	4×100 m medley
Representing England
Commonwealth Games
Silver medal – second place	1962 Perth	110 yd butterfly
Silver medal – second place	1962 Perth	4×110 yd medley

Mary Anne Cotterill (born 16 October 1945) is a retired English butterfly swimmer.

== Swimming career ==
Cooerill won two bronze medals in the 4 × 100 m medley relay at the 1962 and 1966 European Aquatics Championships. She finished fifth in the same event at the 1964 Summer Olympics. She also won two silver medals in the 110 yd butterfly and 4×110 yd medley relay at the 1962 Commonwealth Games in Perth, Western Australia. In the 110 yd butterfly she was second to the world record holder Mary Stewart of Canada.

She represented England and won two silver medals in 110 yards butterfly and the medley relay, at the 1962 British Empire and Commonwealth Games in Perth, Western Australia.

At the ASA National British Championships she won the 110 yards butterfly title in 1964.

Cotterill represented the England team again at the 1966 British Empire and Commonwealth Games in Kingston, Jamaica, where she reached the final of the 110 yards butterfly event.

== Personal life ==
Cotterill retired from international swimming in 1966 but continued to captain the University of London swimming team while a medical student at St Mary's Hospital. She qualified as a doctor in 1971 and went on to combine a part-time medical career with a family. She retired from medical practice in 1998 and went on to be a bereavement counsellor and supervisor for Cruse. Two of her daughters are also doctors, whilst her third works in marketing for Nestle.
