= Peter Doak =

Australian swimmer (born 1944)

Personal information
- Full name: Peter John Doak
- National team: Australia
- Born: 9 March 1944 (age 82) Geelong, Victoria, Australia

Sport
- Sport: Swimming
- Strokes: Freestyle
Medal record
Men's swimming
Representing Australia
Olympic Games
Bronze medal – third place	1964 Tokyo	4×100 m freestyle relay
British Empire and Commonwealth Games
Gold medal – first place	1962 Perth	Men's 4×110 yd Freestyle Relay

Peter John Doak, OAM (born 9 March 1944) was an Australian sprint freestyle swimmer of the 1960s, who won a bronze medal in the 4×100-metre freestyle relay at the 1964 Summer Olympics in Tokyo. He attended Geelong College between 1955 and 1960 where he joined the swimming team in 1958.

Doak combined with Bob Windle, David Dickson and John Ryan to win bronze in the 4 × 100 m freestyle relay, behind the United States and German teams, the first time this event had been contested at the Olympics. Doak had previously won gold in the 4×110-yard freestyle relay at the 1962 Commonwealth Games in Perth, and finished fourth in the corresponding individual event. In 2014, Doak was awarded the medal of the Order of Australia.

== See also ==
- List of Commonwealth Games medallists in swimming (men)
- List of Olympic medalists in swimming (men)
