= Sue Costin =

Australian swimmer and actress

Personal information
- Full name: Susan Angela Costin
- Nationality: Australian
- Born: 9 September 1944 Camperdown, Sydney, Australia

Sport
- Sport: Swimming
- Coached by: Bruce McDonald

Susan Angela Costin (born 9 September 1944) was an Australian professional swimmer who represented Australia during the 1962 British Empire and Commonwealth Games in the women's backstroke events.

== Life and career ==
Costin was born Susan Angela Costin on 9 September 1944 at King George V Hospital to Angela Mann (later Angela Costin), a rowing master and her husband Wes, who both later also had another child, Prudence. In 1954, the family moved to Baulkham Hills, where Sue and her sister began swimming at Granville pool and became competitive members of the Parramatta City Amateur Swimming Club.

=== Swimming ===
In 1959, Costin won the western Sydney swimming title and represented New South Wales in 1960 during the Australian Swimming Championships. She also won the Gladstone skiff rowing event, which she was using a form of training for the upcoming 1962 British Empire and Commonwealth Games and was by then described as "an outstanding backstroke swimmer". In January 1962, Costin lowered the Australian 110 yards (100 m) record in backstroke for the second time within three days, with a time of 1 minute 12.5 seconds, just 1.55 seconds short of the record held by British swimmer Nancy Stewart. She was described that year by Australian freestyle swimmer Ilsa Konrads as being "undoubtedly Australia's best stylist in backstroke".

In October 1962, when Costin was a member of the Australian swimming squad training for the 1962 British Empire and Commonwealth Games in Perth, she set two new Australian records in the women's 110 yards (100 m) and 220 yards (200 m) backstroke. At this time, she was being coached by Bruce McDonald. Earlier that month, she had come within one second of the world 220-yard record. She represented Australia in the 1962 British Empire and Commonwealth Games, finishing 5th in each of the 110 yards (100 m) and 220 yards (200 m) backstroke events with a time of 1:12.4 and 2:38.6 in each respectively. Two years later, she failed to quality for the 1964 Summer Olympics in Tokyo and subsequently decided to retire from competitive swimming. As of 2005, her 50 metres (160 ft) backstroke record set in 1958/59 at the Parramatta City Swimming Club for girls aged 16 years remained unbeaten.

== See also ==
- "Women in Sport". The Sydney Morning Herald. 14 May 1961. p. 33.
