= Don Talbot =

Australian Olympic swimming coach and sport administrator(1933–2020)

Don Talbot AO OBE

1st Director of the Australian Institute of Sport
- In office 1980–1983

Personal details
- Born: Donald Malcolm Talbot; 23 August 1933 Barnsley, New South Wales, Australia
- Died: 3 November 2020 (aged 87) Gold Coast, Queensland, Australia
- Relatives: Scott Talbot-Cameron (son)
- Occupation: Sports administrator, Olympic swimming coach: 1964 Summer Olympics; 1980 Summer Olympics; 2000 Summer Olympics
- Known for: National head coach for Swimming Canada, head coach for Australian Swimming

Donald Malcolm Talbot AO OBE (23 August 1933 – 3 November 2020) was an Australian Olympic swimming coach and sport administrator.

He coached national teams for Canada, the United States and Australia.

== Early life ==
Talbot was born on 23 August 1933 as the second of six children in the New South Wales township of Barnsley near Newcastle. His parents were both of English descent; his father, Arthur Talbot, was from a family of coal miners from Yorkshire, and started work on the mines in Newcastle when he arrived with his brothers and sisters in Australia in 1914. His mother, Elsie Francis Channel, emigrated from England to Australia in 1909. When Talbot was three his father had a mining accident that ended his career, and subsequently moved the family to the Sydney suburb of Bankstown. He began working in a garage adjoining the family home, and worked as a toolmaker in the Sydney CBD during World War II.

Talbot's first contact with water involved a near-drowning accident at the age of four and a half at Stanwell Park. After the accident, his mother enrolled him and the rest of the family in swimming lessons.

He later took up competitive swimming under the wing of leading coach Frank Guthrie who waived his customary fee of £1 per week because Talbot's parents could not afford it. He won the New South Wales Under 14 backstroke championship and broke the New South Wales Under 14 record for the 165-yard (150 m) individual medley. He attended Bankstown Primary School, Bankstown Technical School and Homebush Boys High School. He failed his high school leaving certificate, but took a scholarship at Wagga Wagga Teacher's College. After graduating from teacher's college, he taught physical education at Revesby General Primary School.

== Career ==
Talbot was a young teacher when he started coaching in 1956. While working with Guthrie at Bankstown Swimming Pool in Sydney, he took over the coaching of two young Latvian immigrants – brother and sister John and Ilsa Konrads. While he was coaching these swimmers, both broke world records with John winning Olympic and Commonwealth Games gold medals and Ilsa a Commonwealth Games gold medal.

Other notable Australian swimmers who were coached or greatly assisted by Talbot in the 1960s and 1970s included Bob Windle, Kevin Berry, Beverley Whitfield, and Gail Neall.

In 1964, Talbot went to the 1964 Tokyo Olympic Games as the Australian men's swimming coach, a position he held until 1972. He then moved to Canada due to the lack of funding for swimming in Australia. He worked as head coach for both the Thunder Bay Thunderbolts Swim Club and the Canadian national swimming team. While in Canada, he studied for a Bachelor and Master of Psychology at Lakehead University. He then spent two years coaching the United States team for the 1980 Moscow Olympics before the US boycotted the games.

In 1980, he was appointed the inaugural Director of the Australian Institute of Sport (AIS). His major achievements were ensuring that the AIS received adequate funding from the Australian Government for high performance sport programs and the development of world class training facilities and support services for Australian athletes and coaches. He departed in 1983 to return to Canada once again.

He was the national head coach for Swimming Canada during its greatest period of success in the 1984 and 1988 Summer Olympics, and some have credited Talbot with its success. He was dismissed by the Canadian Olympic Committee some months before the 1988 games after demanding more rigid qualification standards and was replaced by Dave Johnson.

In 1989, Talbot took the position of National Head Coach at Australian Swimming. At the 2000 Sydney Olympic Games, Talbot's coaching tenure resulted in Australia producing its best swimming performance since the 1972 Munich Olympics. It finished second to the US with five gold, nine silver and four bronze medals. He retired as Australia's head coach after Australia topped the swimming gold medal tally at the 2001 World Aquatics Championships in Fukuoka.

He was an outspoken critic of the use of steroids in swimming, notably during an incident during the 1998 World Aquatics Championships when Chinese swimmer Yuan Yuan was expelled from the competition.

== Personal life ==
Talbot was married three times. His first marriage, which lasted for 22 years, was to Shirley Spindler, whom he met and married as a teenager in Wagga Wagga. They had three daughters and a son, Christine, Leonie, Jon and Lee. From 1973 to 1989, he was married to Janice Murphy (later Jan Cameron), who worked closely with Talbot in both her swimming and coaching careers until the end of their relationship. The only child from that marriage, Scott Talbot, is an Olympic swimmer and coach. In 1990, he married Janet (née Henderson), a Canadian teacher; the marriage had ended by the time of his death.

In 2003, Talbot published a memoir on his career – Talbot : nothing but the best with Kevin Berry and Ian Heads.

Talbot died on 3 November 2020 on the Gold Coast at the age of 87 after complications from dementia.

== Recognition ==
- 1979 – Inducted into the International Swimming Hall of Fame
- 1981 Birthday Honours – Officer of the Order of the British Empire
- 1990 – Inducted into the Sport Australia Hall of Fame as a General Member.
- 1990 – Australian Swimming Coaches and Teachers Association (ASCTA) – Master Coach
- 1995 – Australian Swimming Coaches and Teachers Association (ASCTA) – Life Member
- 2000 – Australian Sports Medal
- 2001 – Centenary Medal
- 2004 – Life Member Swimming Australia
- 2007 – Officer of the Order of Australia

== See also ==
- List of members of the International Swimming Hall of Fame
