= Julian Carroll (swimmer) =

Australian swimmer

Personal information
- Full name: Julian Paul Carroll
- National team: Australia
- Born: 5 November 1942 (age 83)k Melbourne, Victoria
- Height: 1.88 m (6 ft 2 in)
- Weight: 80 kg (176 lb)

Sport
- Sport: Swimming
- Strokes: Backstroke
Medal record
Men's swimming
Representing Australia
Commonwealth Games
Gold medal – first place	1962 Perth	220 yd backstroke
Gold medal – first place	1962 Perth	4×110 yd medley relay
Silver medal – second place	1962 Perth	110 yd backstroke

Julian Paul Carroll (born 5 November 1942) is an Australian former swimmer who competed in the 1960 Summer Olympics in Rome. Carroll swam the backstroke leg in the preliminary heats for the second-place Australian team in the men's 4×100-metre medley relay.

Because he did not compete in the event final, he did not receive a medal under the Olympic swimming rules in effect in 1960. At the 1962 Commonwealth Games in Perth, Western Australia, Carroll won two gold medals in the 220-yard backstroke and 4×110-yard medley relay, and a silver medal in the 110-yard backstroke. In 2000 Carroll was awarded the Australian Sports Medal in recognition of his sporting achievements.

Following his retirement from competitive swimming and studies in the United States (University of Oregon), Carroll moved to Canada and in 1971 was appointed Executive Director of the Aquatic Federation of Canada and Swimming Canada in Ottawa with responsibilities for preparation of Canadian swimming for the 1976 Montréal Olympic Games. He served as liaison officer for swimming with the Montréal Olympic Organising Committee (COJO)and as a member of their observer mission to the 1972 Munich Olympic Games.

In 1986 Carroll married Joan Haanappel, former Dutch Olympic figure skater.

== See also ==
- List of Commonwealth Games medallists in swimming (men)
