= Murray Rose =

Australian swimmer (1939–2012)

Murray Rose AM
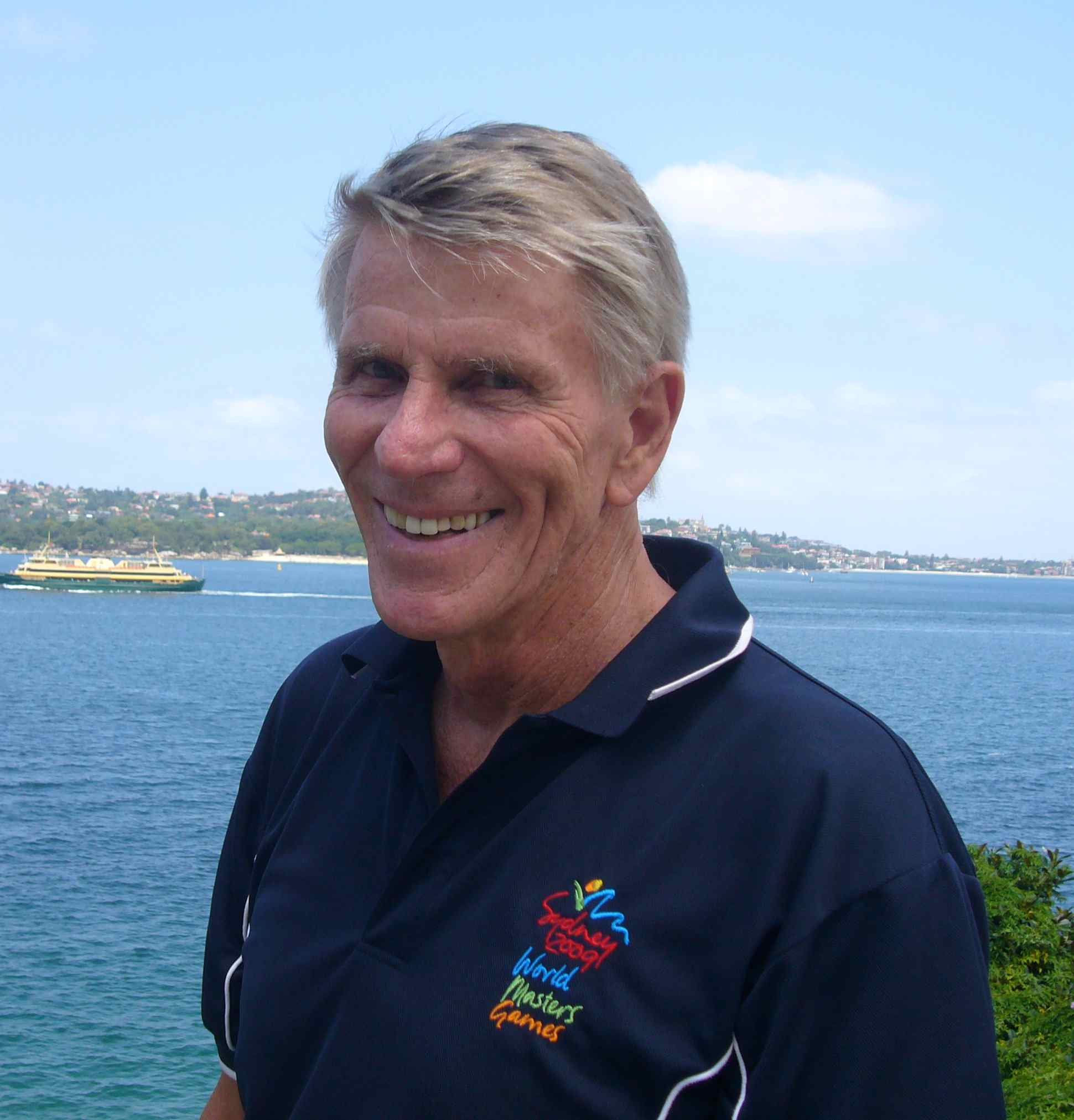
- Rose in 2009

Personal information
- Full name: Iain Murray Rose
- National team: Australia
- Born: 6 January 1939 Birmingham, England, United Kingdom
- Died: 15 April 2012 (aged 73) Sydney, Australia
- Education: Cranbrook School, Sydney
- Height: 1.85 m (6 ft 1 in)
- Weight: 80 kg (176 lb)

Sport
- Sport: Swimming
- Freestyle: 400m/440yd; 800m; 1500m/1650yd; 4 x 110yd relay; 4 x 200m/220yd relay
- College team: University of Southern California
- Club: Bondi Swimming Club
- Retired: c. 1966
Medal record
Representing Australia
Olympic Games
Gold medal – first place	1956 Melbourne	400 m freestyle
Gold medal – first place	1956 Melbourne	1500 m freestyle
Gold medal – first place	1956 Melbourne	4×200 m freestyle
Gold medal – first place	1960 Rome	400 m freestyle
Silver medal – second place	1960 Rome	1500 m freestyle
Bronze medal – third place	1960 Rome	4×200 m freestyle
British Empire and Commonwealth Games
Gold medal – first place	1962 Perth	440 yd freestyle
Gold medal – first place	1962 Perth	1650 yd freestyle
Gold medal – first place	1962 Perth	4×110 yd freestyle
Gold medal – first place	1962 Perth	4×220 yd freestyle

Iain Murray Rose, AM (6 January 1939 – 15 April 2012) was an Australian swimmer, who swam for the University of Southern California, and worked as an actor, sports commentator and marketing executive. He was a six-time Olympic medalist (four gold, one silver, one bronze), and at one time held the world records in the 400-metre, 800-metre, and 1500-metre freestyle (long course). He made his Olympic debut at the 1956 Summer Olympics in Melbourne as a 17-year-old and won three Olympic medals, all gold. Four years later, as a 21-year-old, he won three Olympic medals (one gold, one silver, one bronze) at the 1960 Summer Olympics in Rome, Italy.

== Biography ==
=== Early life ===
Iain Murray Rose was born on 6 January 1939 in Birmingham, England, UK to parents Eileen and Ian Rose. As World War II broke out, his family moved to Australia in 1940 when he was a baby. He started swimming as a boy and attended Cranbrook School in Bellevue Hill, Sydney. He swam regularly at Redleaf Pool, an enclosed saltwater swimming pool in the suburb of Double Bay. In 2012, the pool was renamed Murray Rose Pool in his honour.

=== Career ===
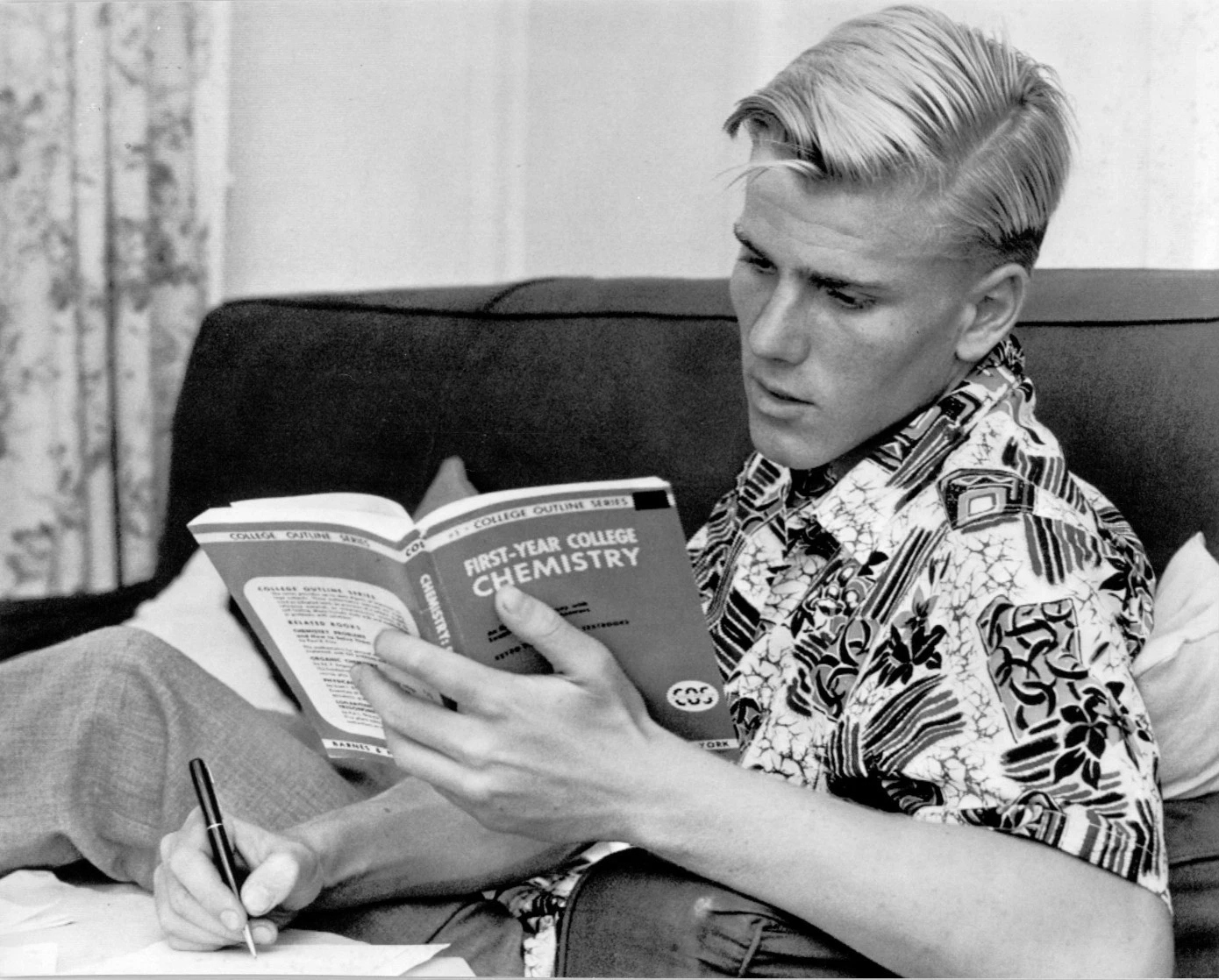
Rose in 1957

At the age of 17, Rose participated in the 1956 Summer Olympics in Melbourne. He won the 400-metre and 1500-metre freestyle races and was a member of the winning team in the 4×200-metre freestyle relay. Winning three gold medals in his home country immediately made him a national hero. He was the youngest Olympian to be awarded three gold medals at one Olympic Games. Afterwards, Rose moved to the United States to accept an athletic scholarship at the University of Southern California (USC) where he received a Bachelor of Arts degree in Business/Communications. Rose introduced the swim brief made by Speedo at the 1956 Olympics.

He continued competing while at USC, and graduated in 1962. At the 1960 Summer Olympics in Rome, Italy, Rose again won an Olympic gold medal in the 400m freestyle, as well as a silver in the 1500m freestyle and a bronze in the 4 × 200 m freestyle relay, bringing his total to six Olympic medals. In addition to his Olympic medals, he won four gold medals at the 1962 Commonwealth Games in Perth, Western Australia. He eventually set 15 world records, including the world record in the 800-metre freestyle in 1962, which was not broken until Semyon Belits-Geiman set a new record in 1966. Rose missed the 1964 Tokyo Olympics as he was attending university in the United States at the time of Australia's Olympic trials and so was omitted from their Olympic team; he had set world records for 880 yard and 1,500 metre freestyle event earlier in the months before the Games and would have been a medal favourite.

During the 1960s, he also pursued an acting career, starring in two Hollywood films and making guest appearances on television shows such as Adventure Unlimited.

In addition, Rose worked as an Australian sports commentator for the Nine Network, plus each of the major US networks, participating in seven consecutive Olympic Games.

Rose continued to compete as a masters swimmer. In 1981, he won the World Masters title in faster times than he recorded at the 1956 Games.

From 1988-94, Rose was vice-president of California Sports Marketing specialising in marketing, sponsorships and promotions for the Los Angeles Lakers basketball team and special events at the Great Western Forum.

He returned to Sydney with his family in 1994 and worked as a Senior Account Director for Sports Marketing and Management – the official marketing agent for the Australian Olympic Committee, the Australian Commonwealth Games Association and a range of other leading Australian sports organisations.

Murray Rose being interviewed by a Seven News journalist during a live cross of the evening news bulletin to Circular Quay in Sydney prior to the opening ceremony of the 2008 Beijing Olympics.

An avenue at Sydney Olympic Park was named for him in 2000. He was one of the eight flag-bearers of the Olympic Flag at the 2000 Summer Olympics opening ceremony in Sydney.

In 2010, Rose led a team on a pilgrimage for Military History Tours to Gallipoli and a 4.5 km swim from Europe to Asia across the Dardanelles.

In 2012, Redleaf Pool in Double Bay, Sydney, was officially renamed Murray Rose Pool in his honour. In 2022 Cranbrook School named its new swimming complex on New South Head Road the Murray Rose Aquatic & Fitness Centre.

=== Work in film and television ===
In 1958, he appeared on You Bet Your Life where he was baffled by the world geography questions. On 6 January 1959, Rose appeared as a guest challenger on the TV panel show To Tell the Truth where he stumped the panel as they all voted for the wrong person.

He made his acting debut in the 1962 Australian live drama My Three Angels. He also guest starred in an episode of Adventure Unlimited.

Later he starred in the 1964 surf movie Ride the Wild Surf and in Ice Station Zebra in 1968. He also made periodic appearances in television and film including guest spots on Dr Kildare, You Bet Your Life, The Patty Duke Show, Dream Rider, Time Capsule 1932 and Time Capsule 1938.

=== Charity ===
Rose held a number of cause-related Board positions including the Mary MacKillop Foundation and Patron of Rainbow Club Australia, a non-profit charity providing children with special needs the opportunity to explore their abilities through sporting and recreational activities. In 2012, Rainbow Club Australia renamed their annual event, The Murray Rose's Malabar Magic Ocean Swim. The MRMM offers a two swim program of 1 km and 2.4 km

=== Honours ===
He was among the first swimmers inducted into the International Swimming Hall of Fame, in 1965, was voted Australia's greatest male Olympian by his peers in 1983, and inducted into the Sport Australia Hall of Fame in 1985.

Rose was appointed a Member of the Order of Australia (AM) in 2000 for services to swimming. He also received the Australian Sports Medal that year and, in 2001, he was awarded the Centenary Medal. In 2023, he was inducted into the Swimming Australia Hall of Fame.

=== Books ===
Murray Rose's father, Ian F Rose, published Faith, Love, and Seaweed about his son's childhood and diet. In 2013, Murray Rose's memoir Life is Worth Swimming was posthumously published. Written before his leukaemia diagnosis, Life is Worth Swimming reflects on Rose's life and experiences as an Olympic swimmer.

- Murray Rose (2013). Life is Worth Swimming. Arbon Publishing. ISBN 978-0-9872820-6-4.

=== Personal life ===
Rose married ballerina Jodi Wintz on 20 October 1988. Their son was born in 1990. He was previously married to Bobbie Whitby and he adopted her daughter.

Rose was a strict vegetarian in his swimming days – this earned him the nickname "The Seaweed Streak" – but he later added meat to his diet.

Rose died of leukaemia on 15 April 2012 at the age of 73 in Sydney, New South Wales.

== Filmography ==
Year	Title	Role	Notes
1964	Ride the Wild Surf	Swag	
1968	Ice Station Zebra	Lt. George Mills	
1993	Dreamrider	Father OGorman	
2003	Swimming Upstream	Reporter #3	

== See also ==
- List of members of the International Swimming Hall of Fame
- List of Commonwealth Games medallists in swimming (men)
- List of Olympic medalists in swimming (men)
- World record progression 400 metres freestyle
- World record progression 800 metres freestyle
- World record progression 1500 metres freestyle
- World record progression 4 × 200 metres freestyle relay

Records
Preceded by Ford Konno; John Konrads	Men's 400 m freestyle world record holder (long course); 27 Oct 1956 – 15 Jan 1958; 17 Aug 1962 – 31 July 1964	Succeeded by John Konrads; Don Schollander
Preceded by George Breen; Roy Saari	Men's 1500 m freestyle world record holder (long course); 30 Oct 1956 – 5 Dec 1956; 2 Aug 1964 – 2 Sep 1964	Succeeded by George Breen; Roy Saari
Preceded by John Konrads	Men's 800 m freestyle world record holder (long course); 26 Aug 1962 – 3 Aug 1966	Succeeded by Semyon Belits-Geiman
