= Swimming at the 1964 Summer Olympics – Women's 100 metre freestyle =

Women's 100 metre freestyle at the Games of the XVIII Olympiad
- Venue: Yoyogi National Gymnasium
- Dates: 12 October 1964 (heats & semifinals); 13 October 1964 (finals)
- Competitors: 44 from 22 nations
- Winning time: 59.5 OR

Medalists
1st place, gold medalist(s)		Dawn Fraser; Australia
2nd place, silver medalist(s)		Sharon Stouder; United States
3rd place, bronze medalist(s)		Kathy Ellis; United States

The women's 100 metre freestyle event at the 1964 Olympic Games took place between October 12 and 13. This swimming event used freestyle swimming, which means that the method of the stroke is not regulated (unlike backstroke, breaststroke, and butterfly events). Nearly all swimmers use the front crawl or a variant of that stroke. Because an Olympic-size swimming pool is 50 metres long, this race consisted of two lengths of the pool.

== Results ==
=== Heats ===
Heat 1

Rank	Athlete	Country	Time	Note
1	Kathy Ellis	United States	1:01.5	
2	Martina Grunert	Germany	1:03.1	
3	Daniela Beneck	Italy	1:03.2	
4	Winnie van Weerdenburg	Netherlands	1:03.8	
5	Ryoko Urakami	Japan	1:04.5	
6	Mary Beth Stewart	Canada	1:05.1	
7	Im Geum-ja	South Korea	1:16.1	

Heat 2

Rank	Athlete	Country	Time	Note
1	Ann-Christine Hagberg	Sweden	1:02.5	
2	Rita Schumacher	Germany	1:03.5	
3	Anneliese Rockenbach	Venezuela	1:04.3	
4	Paola Saini	Italy	1:04.4	
5	Sandra Keen	Great Britain	1:04.7	
6	Toos Beumer	Netherlands	1:05.2	
7	Ann Lallande	Puerto Rico	1:06.8	

Heat 3

Rank	Athlete	Country	Time	Note
1	Jeanne Hallock	United States	1:03.6	
2	Robyn Thorn	Australia	1:03.7	
3	Nataliya Ustinova	Soviet Union	1:04.2	
4	Kirsten Strange-Campbell	Denmark	1:05.3	
5	Traudi Beierlein	Germany	1:05.4	
6	Monique Piétri	France	1:05.8	
7	Christl Paukerl	Austria	1:07.3	

Heat 4

Rank	Athlete	Country	Time	Note
1	Erica Terpstra	Netherlands	1:02.5	
2	Judit Turóczy	Hungary	1:02.9	
3	Ulla Jäfvert	Sweden	1:03.8	
4	Nataliya Bystrova	Soviet Union	1:04.0	
5	Diana Wilkinson	Great Britain	1:05.0	
6	Mara Sacchi	Italy	1:05.9	
7	Hrafnhildur Guðmundsdóttir	Iceland	1:06.4	
8	Rosario de Vivanco	Peru	1:09.0	

Heat 5

Rank	Athlete	Country	Time	Note
1	Dawn Fraser	Australia	1:00.6	
2	Marion Lay	Canada	1:02.1	
3	Katalin Takács	Hungary	1:03.5	
4	Toyoko Kimura	Japan	1:04.8	
5	Marilyn Sidelsky	Rhodesia	1:05.5	
6	Linda Amos	Great Britain	1:06.1	
7	Rita Pulido	Spain	1:06.7	
8	Margaret Harding	Puerto Rico	1:11.7	

Heat 6

Rank	Athlete	Country	Time	Note
1	Sharon Stouder	United States	1:02.3	
2	Lyn Bell	Australia	1:02.4	
3	Csilla Madarász-Bajnogel-Dobai	Hungary	1:02.5	
4	Ann-Charlotte Lilja	Sweden	1:03.7	
5	Helen Kennedy	Canada	1:04.2	
6	Miyoko Azuma	Japan	1:06.4	
7	Jovina Tseng	Malaysia	1:13.9	

=== Semifinals ===
Heat 1

Rank	Athlete	Country	Time	Note
1	Dawn Fraser	Australia	59.9	
2	Marion Lay	Canada	1:02.2	
3	Lyn Bell	Australia	1:02.2	
4	Csilla Madarász	Hungary	1:02.3	
5	Jeanne Hallock	United States	1:02.4	
6	Daniela Beneck	Italy	1:02.9	
7	Judit Turóczy	Hungary	1:03.0	
8	Robyn Thorn	Australia	1:03.9	

Heat 2

Rank	Athlete	Country	Time	Note
1	Sharon Stouder	United States	1:01.4	
2	Erica Terpstra	Netherlands	1:02.3	
3	Kathy Ellis	United States	1:02.5	
4	Ann-Christine Hagberg	Sweden	1:02.8	
5	Martina Grunert	Germany	1:03.1	
6	Katalin Takács	Hungary	1:03.3	
7	Ann-Charlotte Lilja	Sweden	1:03.9	
8	Ulla Jäfvert	Sweden	1:04.6	

=== Final ===
Rank	Athlete	Country	Time	Notes
1	Dawn Fraser	Australia	59.5	OR
2	Sharon Stouder	United States	59.9	
3	Kathy Ellis	United States	1:00.8	
4	Erica Terpstra	Netherlands	1:01.8	
5	Marion Lay	Canada	1:02.2	
6	Csilla Madarász-Bajnogel-Dobai	Hungary	1:02.4	
7	Ann-Christine Hagberg	Sweden	1:02.5	
8	Lyn Bell	Australia	1:02.7	

Key: OR = Olympic record
