= Swimming at the 1964 Summer Olympics – Women's 4 × 100 metre freestyle relay =

Women's 4 × 100 metre freestyle relay at the Games of the XVIII Olympiad
- Venue: Yoyogi National Gymnasium
- Dates: 14 October 1964 (heats); 15 October 1964 (final)
- Competitors: 46 from 10 nations
- Teams: 10
- Winning time: 4:03.8 WR

Medalists
1st place, gold medalist(s)		Sharon Stouder, Donna de Varona, Lillian Watson, Kathy Ellis, Jeanne Hallock*, Erika Bricker*, Lynne Allsup*, Patience Sherman*	United States
2nd place, silver medalist(s)		Robyn Thorn, Janice Murphy, Lynette Bell, Dawn Fraser, Jan Turner*	Australia
3rd place, bronze medalist(s)		Pauline van der Wildt, Toos Beumer, Winnie van Weerdenburg, Erica Terpstra *Indicates the swimmer only competed in the preliminary heats.	Netherlands

The women's 4 × 100 metre freestyle relay event at the 1964 Summer Olympics took place on October 14 and 15, 1964. The relay featured teams of four swimmers each swimming two lengths of the 50 m pool freestyle.

== Results ==
=== Heats ===
Heat 1

Place	Swimmers	Time	Notes
1	Jeanne Hallock, Erika Bricker, Lynne Allsup, Patience Sherman (USA)	4:12.2	
2	Ann-Charlotte Lilja, Lotten Andersson, Ulla Jäfvert, Ann-Christine Hagberg (SWE)	4:13.5	
3	Pauline van der Wildt, Toos Beumer, Winnie van Weerdenburg, Erica Terpstra (NED)	4:14.8	
4	Patty Thompson, Mary Beth Stewart, Helen Kennedy, Marion Lay (CAN)	4:14.9	
5	Ryoko Urakami, Michiko Kihara, Toyoko Kimura, Miyoko Azuma (JPN)	4:19.2	NR

Heat 2

Place	Swimmers	Time	Notes
1	Robyn Thorn, Janice Murphy, Jan Turner, Lyn Bell (AUS)	4:11.8	
2	Judit Turóczy, Mária Frank, Éva Erdélyi, Csilla Madarász-Bajnogel-Dobai (HUN)	4:13.4	
3	Heidi Pechstein, Traudi Beierlein, Martina Grunert, Rita Schumacher (EUA)	4:14.9	
4	Paola Saini, Maria Cristina Pacifici, Mara Sacchi, Daniela Beneck (ITA)	4:15.0	
5	Sandra Keen, Pauline Sillett, Liz Long, Diana Wilkinson (GBR)	4:15.1	

=== Final ===
Place	Swimmers	Time	Notes
1	Sharon Stouder, Donna de Varona, Lillian Watson, Kathy Ellis (USA)	4:03.8	WR
2	Robyn Thorn, Janice Murphy, Lyn Bell, Dawn Fraser (AUS)	4:06.9	
3	Pauline van der Wildt, Toos Beumer, Winnie van Weerdenburg, Erica Terpstra (NED)	4:12.0	
4	Judit Turóczy, Éva Erdélyi, Katalin Takács, Csilla Madarász-Bajnogel-Dobai (HUN)	4:12.1	
5	Ann-Charlotte Lilja, Lotten Andersson, Ulla Jäfvert, Ann-Christine Hagberg (SWE)	4:14.0	
6	Martina Grunert, Traudi Beierlein, Rita Schumacher, Heidi Pechstein (EUA)	4:15.0	
7	Mary Beth Stewart, Patty Thompson, Helen Kennedy, Marion Lay (CAN)	4:15.9	
8	Paola Saini, Maria Cristina Pacifici, Mara Sacchi, Daniela Beneck (ITA)	4:17.2	
