= Patience Sherman =

American swimmer (born 1946)

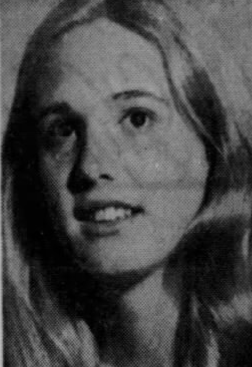
- Sherman circa 1969

Personal information
- Full name: Patience Halsey Sherman
- National team: United States
- Born: September 20, 1946 (age 79) Montclair, New Jersey, U.S.
- Height: 5 ft 7 in (1.70 m)
- Weight: 130 lb (59 kg)
- Spouses: George Harold Williamson; Gerald Boyer

Sport
- Sport: Swimming
- Strokes: Freestyle
- Club: New Jersey Swim Association
- College team: Elmira College; Trained, did not compete
- Coach: Bob Alexander (New Jersey Swim)

Patience Halsey Sherman (born September 20, 1946) is an American former competition swimmer who competed for the New Jersey Athletic Association and participated in the 1964 Tokyo Olympics in a preliminary heat of the gold medal winning Women's 4 × 100-meter freestyle relay but was not eligible for a medal as she did not compete in the final heat.

== Early life ==
Patience Sherman was born in the Upper Montclair section of Montclair, New Jersey, on September 20, 1946, to Mr. and Mrs. Nathaniel H. Sherman, a Manager of Technical Services for Brooklyn's American Manufacturing Company. She was named after her maternal grandmother, Patience Halsey. Her paternal grandfather, Nathaniel Alden Sherman, was a member of the United States Olympic track team, and competed in the 100 and 200-meter events at the 1908 London Olympics. After Patience's birth in Montclair, the family lived for a period in Virginia when Patience was 9. She began her swimming career around 1955 after entering a state swimming meet when her family was living in Virginia, where she won the 50-yard freestyle, setting a new state record for girls under 10. In Virginia, Patience swam and competed with the Waynesboro, Virginia Sharks, about 35 miles (56 km) east of Richmond, later known as the Shenandoah Valley Aquatic Club under Head Coach R.J. "Jenny" Street and Assistant Coach Alice Brooker.

The family then returned to Montclair in 1956, where Patience graduated Montclair High School in June 1964. Sherman began swimming with the Montclair YMCA, but by early 1960 at the age of 13, she trained and competed with the New Jersey Swim Association under head coach Bob Alexander, who swam for Syracuse, and would serve as a president of the New Jersey Amateur Athletic Union, and on the U.S. Olympic Committee. Patience's sister Linda also competed in swimming and was also coached by Bob Alexander.

== Early swimming milestones ==
As a 13-year-old, she broke the New Jersey state record in the 100-yard freestyle with the record time of 1:05.1 at the Junior Women's Championship on January 23, 1960. Like many young champions, Sherman excelled in many strokes early in career, and competed well in events in the butterfly, backstroke, and breaststroke but won more consistently in freestyle. At the 1959 New Jersey State AAU competition in Ridgewood, New Jersey, around the age of 12, Sherman won the 50-yard freestyle with a time of 31.4 seconds. In 1963, in the National Junior Olympics, she won the 100-meter freestyle in the record time of 1:06.8.

In 1964, at the peak of her training for the Olympics, she continued to represent the New Jersey Athletic Association, and in addition to a weekly meet on the weekend, practiced five days a week, splitting her time between the Newark Boy's Club Pool, Harrison New Jersey's RCA Pool, or a pool in Brooklyn. Including meets, Sherman spent around 32 hours weekly in swimming activities, in addition to her school attendance and studies.

== 1964 Tokyo Olympics ==
Sherman qualified for the 1964 Olympics trials in Astoria, Queens, where she finished fifth in the 100-meter freestyle finals with a personal best time of 1:07.7, and won a place on the U.S. 4x100 freestyle relay team. After qualifying, she trained with other members of the U.S. team in Los Angeles, prior to their flight to Tokyo on September 30.

Sherman swam for the U.S. team at the October, 1964 Summer Olympics in Tokyo, as one of eight members of the 4x100 relay squad. She swam for the gold medal-winning U.S. team in the preliminary heats of the women's 4×100-meter freestyle relay. Sherman swam anchor for the preliminary team of Jeanne Hallock, Lynne Allsup, and Erika Bricker. The actual relay finals team consisted of Sharon Stouder, Donna de Varona, Lillian "Pokey" Watson, and Kathy Ellis. Under the 1964 international swimming rules, Sherman did not receive a medal because she did not compete in the event final, although her preliminary team performed well, qualifying the Americans for the final heat. Other swimming medalists at the 1964 Olympics that had swum with Sherman's Coach Alexander, primarily at the New Jersey Athletic Association included Jed Graef, Thompson Mann, and Phil Riker.

On July 17, 1965, Sherman swam a record 2:20.5 for the 200-meter freestyle at the New Jersey Senior Women's Invitational Meet in Colonia, New Jersey.

By October, 1965, she held the New Jersey State Women's Championship in the 100-yard Butterfly, and both the 100 and 200-yard freestyle.

=== 1965 Pre-Olympics ===
Representing the New Jersey Swimming Association, to qualify for the Mexico City pre-Olympics, Sherman swam a personal best time of 1:01.6 in the 100-meter freestyle, taking second to Lillian "Pokey" Watson in Mid-August, 1965 at the National AAU Swimming Championships in Maumee, Ohio. Watson, who took first place with a time of 1:00.7 at the Championship in Maumee, had been on the Gold Medal 4x100-meter freestyle team at the 1964 Summer Olympics, where Sherman had anchored the preliminary heat for the team. Sherman's finish qualified her for the Pre-Olympics in Mexico City.

Sherman in 1965

Sherman swam in the 1965 pre-Olympic Games Survey Group in October 1965, in Mexico City, where she won two gold medals swimming for two relay teams, and took second place, winning a silver medal in the 100-meter freestyle and leading the U.S. team to the high point trophy. Patience had qualified for the meet at the AAU championship in Maumee, Ohio.

In the summer of 1967, she coached the Packanack Lake Swimming Club team, which won the Fayson Lakes Invitational Meet and the Winne Trophy, and celebrated an undefeated season that year. She continued as coach in the summer of 1968.

=== Later life ===
Sherman was originally accepted at the University of North Carolina at Greensboro in 1964, but did not attend. She trained and competed internationally after her High School graduation in June, 1964, delaying her entry into college. Staying closer to home, and her original coaches, she attended Elmira College in Elmira, New York, beginning classes in the Fall of 1965, where she continued to train for at least a year at the Elmira College pool. She graduated Elmira on June 1, 1969 with a B.A., and a major in English Literature. She briefly dated Olympic swimming gold medalist Don Schollander around 1964-1965, which generated considerable press coverage. She swam for a period with United States Masters Swimming, and attended a few meets. She married George Harold Williamson on September 27, 1969, in Bridgehampton, Long Island, New York. The groom was a graduate of Iowa State, and the recipient of an MBA from the University of Pennsylvania's Wharton Business School. The couple lived first in northern New Jersey and on the Hamptons on Long Island.

In 1976, Sherman graduated from William Paterson University with a degree in Nursing. She later married Gerald Boyer on March 22, 2009, and lived primarily in Denville Township, New Jersey.
