= Swimming at the 1964 Summer Olympics =

Coordinates: 35.6678°N 139.7003°E

Swimming at the Games of the XVIII Olympiad
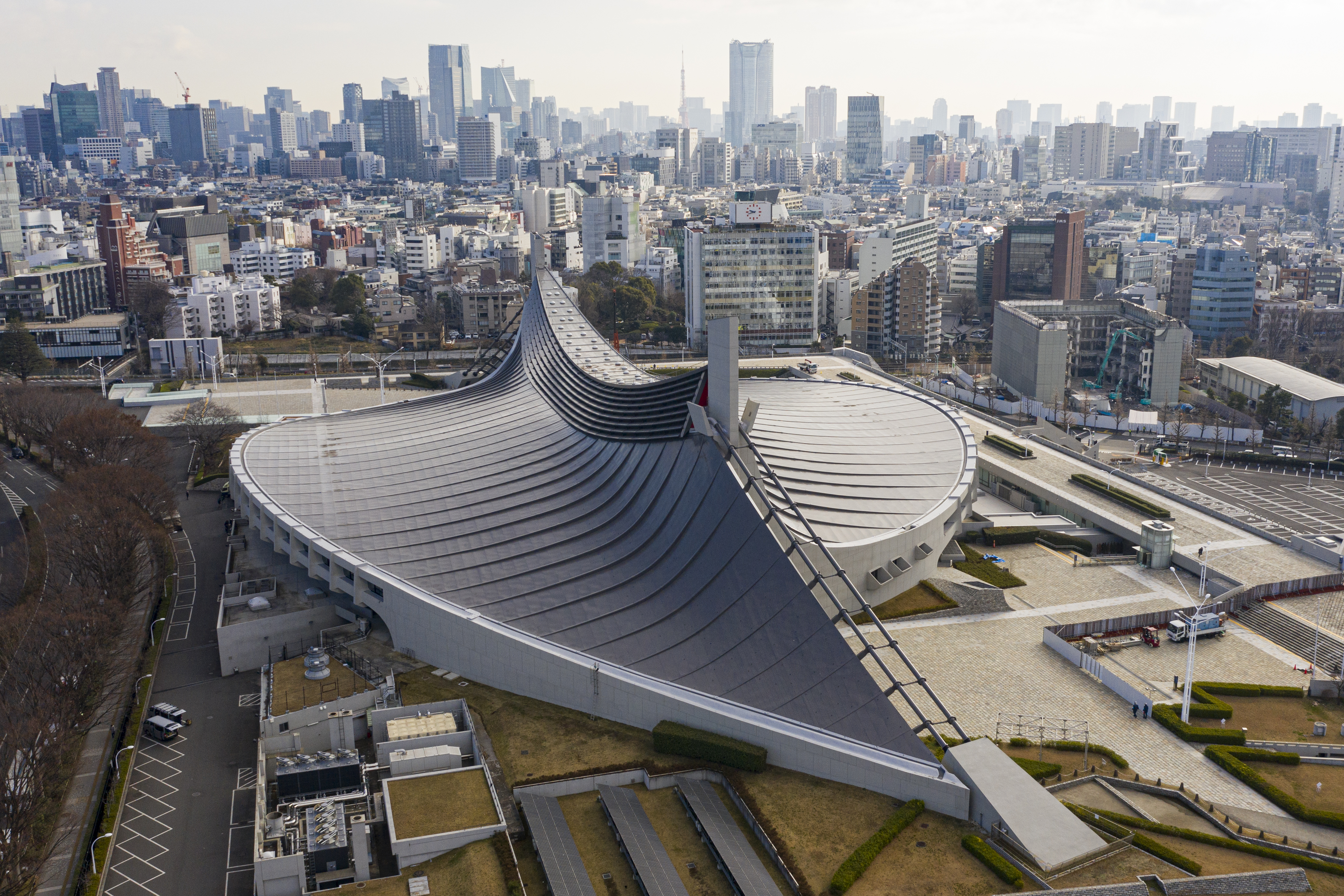
- Venue: Yoyogi National Gymnasium
- Dates: 11–18 October 1964
- No. of events: 18
- Competitors: 405 from 42 nations

At the 1964 Summer Olympics in Tokyo, eighteen swimming events were contested, ten for men and eight for women. There were a total of 405 participants from 42 countries competing. For the first time, the 4 × 100 metres freestyle relay for men and the 400 metres individual medley for both men and women were contested. Olympic records were broken in all events and the world record was broken in ten events. This competition also marked the debut of electronic touchpads for timing.

15-year-old Sharon Stouder won four medals, three of them gold.

== Events ==
Swimming at the 1964 Olympics featured a total of 18 events (10 for men and 8 for women). On the men's side, the 100 metre backstroke was removed, but the 200 metre backstroke, 4× 100 metre freestyle relay, and the 400 metre individual medley was added. On the women's side, the 400 metre individual medley was added. The following events were contested (all pool events are long course, and distances are in meters):

- Freestyle: 100, 200, 400, and 1500 (men's); 100, 400 (women's)
- Backstroke: 100 and 200;
- Breaststroke: 100 and 200;
- Butterfly: 100 and 200;
- Individual medley: 200 and 400;
- Relays: 4 × 100 free, 4 × 200 free, 4 × 100 medley (men's); 4 × 100 free, 4 × 100 medley (women's)

== Participating nations ==
405 swimmers from 42 nations competed.

- Argentina (7)
- Australia (32)
- Austria (7)
- Belgium (2)
- Brazil (4)
- Burma (1)
- Canada (12)
- Colombia (1)
- Czechoslovakia (3)
- Denmark (3)
- Finland (6)

- France (9)
- United Team of Germany (38)
- Great Britain (25)
- Hong Kong (3)
- Hungary (19)
- Iceland (2)
- Iran (1)
- Israel (2)
- Italy (16)
- Japan (38)
- Luxembourg (1)

- Malaysia (7)
- Mexico (10)
- Netherlands (26)
- New Zealand (2)
- Peru (6)
- Philippines (2)
- Portugal (3)
- Puerto Rico (4)
- South Korea (4)
- Soviet Union (21)

- Spain (11)
- Sweden (14)
- Switzerland (2)
- Thailand (2)
- United States (48)
- Venezuela (2)
- Vietnam (3)
- Yugoslavia (2)
- Zambia (2)
- Zimbabwe (2)

== Medal table ==
Rank	Nation	Gold	Silver	Bronze	Total
1	United States	13	8	8	29
2	Australia	4	1	4	9
3	Soviet Union	1	1	2	4
4	United Team of Germany	0	4	2	6
5	Netherlands	0	2	1	3
6	France	0	1	0	1
6	Great Britain	0	1	0	1
8	Japan	0	0	1	1
Totals (8 entries)		18	18	18	54

== Medal summary ==
=== Men's events ===
Games	Gold		Silver		Bronze	
100 m freestyle	Don Schollander; United States	53.4 (OR)	Robert McGregor; Great Britain	53.5	Hans-Joachim Klein; United Team of Germany	54.0
400 m freestyle	Don Schollander; United States	4:12.2 (WR)	Frank Wiegand; United Team of Germany	4:14.9	Allan Wood; Australia	4:15.1
1500 m freestyle	Bob Windle; Australia	17:01.7 (OR)	John Nelson; United States	17:03.0	Allan Wood; Australia	17:07.7
200 m backstroke	Jed Graef; United States	2:10.3 (WR)	Gary Dilley; United States	2:10.5	Bob Bennett; United States	2:13.1
200 m breaststroke	Ian O'Brien; Australia	2:27.8 (WR)	Georgy Prokopenko; Soviet Union	2:28.2	Chet Jastremski; United States	2:29.6
200 m butterfly	Kevin Berry; Australia	2:06.6 (WR)	Carl Robie; United States	2:07.5	Fred Schmidt; United States	2:09.3
400 m individual medley	Dick Roth; United States	4:45.4 (WR)	Roy Saari; United States	4:47.1	Gerhard Hetz; United Team of Germany	4:51.0
4 × 100 m freestyle relay	United States; Steve Clark; Mike Austin; Gary Ilman; Don Schollander	3:33.2 (WR)	United Team of Germany; Horst Löffler; Frank Wiegand; Uwe Jacobsen; Hans-Joachim Klein	3:37.2	Australia; David Dickson; Peter Doak; John Ryan; Bob Windle	3:39.1
4 × 200 m freestyle relay	United States; Steve Clark; Roy Saari; Gary Ilman; Don Schollander	7:52.1 (WR)	United Team of Germany; Horst-Günther Gregor; Gerhard Hetz; Frank Wiegand; Hans-Joachim Klein	7.59.3	Japan; Makoto Fukui; Kunihiro Iwasaki; Toshio Shoji; Yukiaki Okabe	8:03.8
4 × 100 m medley relay	United States; Thompson Mann; Bill Craig; Fred Schmidt; Steve Clark	3:58.4 (WR)	United Team of Germany; Ernst-Joachim Küppers; Egon Henninger; Horst-Günther Gregor; Hans-Joachim Klein	4:01.6	Australia; Peter Reynolds; Ian O'Brien; Kevin Berry; David Dickson	4:02.3

=== Women's events ===
Games	Gold		Silver		Bronze	
100 m freestyle	Dawn Fraser; Australia	59.5 (OR)	Sharon Stouder; United States	59.9	Kathy Ellis; United States	1:00.8
400 m freestyle	Ginny Duenkel; United States	4:43.3 (OR)	Marilyn Ramenofsky; United States	4:44.6	Terri Stickles; United States	4:47.2
100 m backstroke	Cathy Ferguson; United States	1:07.7 (WR)	Kiki Caron; France	1:07.9	Ginny Duenkel; United States	1:08.0
200 m breaststroke	Galina Prozumenshchikova; Soviet Union	2:46.4 (OR)	Claudia Kolb; United States	2:47.6	Svetlana Babanina; Soviet Union	2:48.6
100 m butterfly	Sharon Stouder; United States	1:04.7 (WR)	Ada Kok; Netherlands	1:05.6	Kathy Ellis; United States	1:06.0
400 m individual medley	Donna de Varona; United States	5:18.7 (OR)	Sharon Finneran; United States	5:24.1	Martha Randall; United States	5:24.2
4 × 100 metre freestyle relay	United States; Sharon Stouder; Donna de Varona; Lillian Watson; Kathy Ellis	4:03.8 (WR)	Australia; Robyn Thorn; Janice Murphy; Lynette Bell; Dawn Fraser	4:06.9	Netherlands; Pauline van der Wildt; Toos Beumer; Winnie van Weerdenburg; Erica Terpstra	4:12.0
4 × 100 metre medley relay	United States; Cathy Ferguson; Cynthia Goyette; Sharon Stouder; Kathy Ellis	4:33.9 (OR)	Netherlands; Corrie Winkel; Klenie Bimolt; Ada Kok; Erica Terpstra	4:37.0	Soviet Union; Tatyana Savelyeva; Svetlana Babanina; Tatyana Devyatova; Natalya Ustinova	4:39.2

== Gallery of the medalists ==
Some of the Olympic medalists in Tokyo:

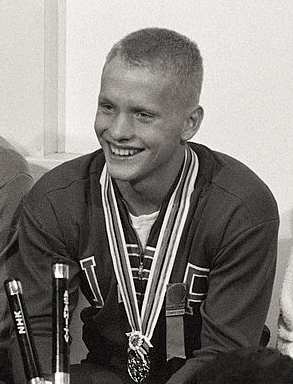
Don Schollander, winner of the 100-metre freestyle, 400-metre freestyle, 4 × 100-metre freestyle relay, and 4 × 200-metre freestyle relay.

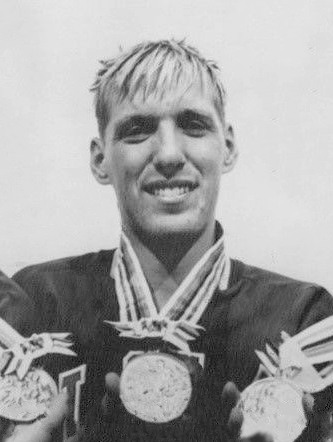
Jed Graef, winner of the 200-metre backstroke.

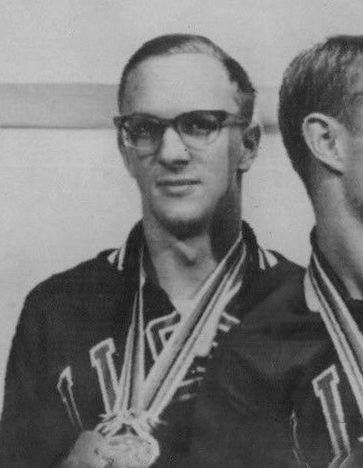
Fred Schmidt, winner of the 4 × 100-metre medley relay.

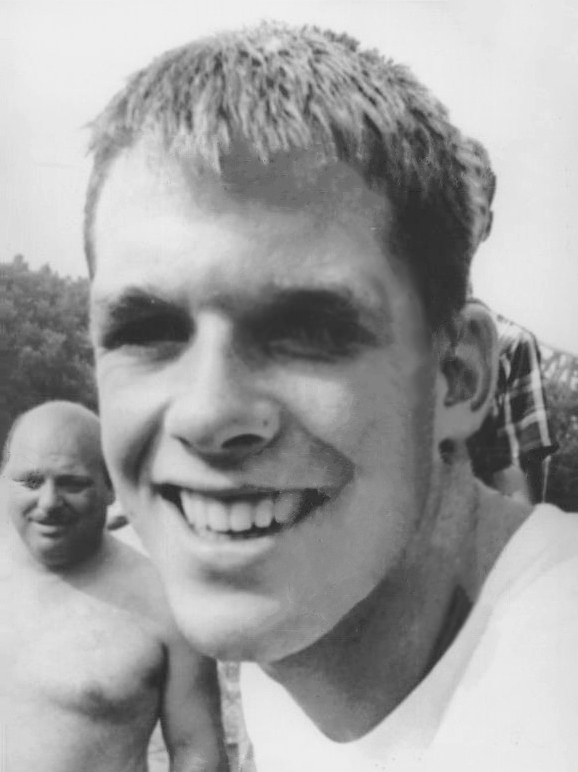
Dick Roth, winner of the 400-metre individual medley.

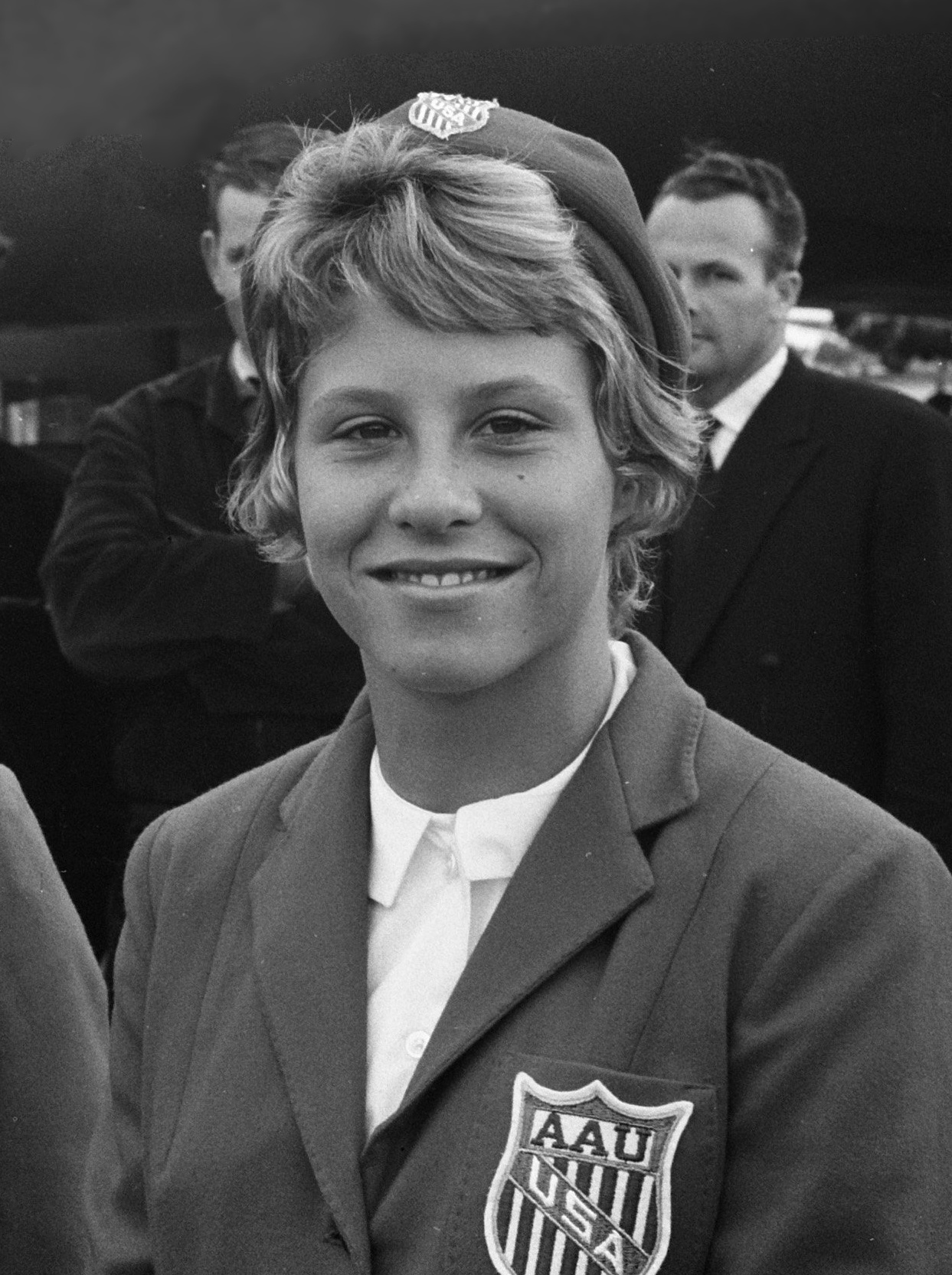
Donna de Varona, winner of the 400-metre individual medley and 4 × 100-metre freestyle relay.

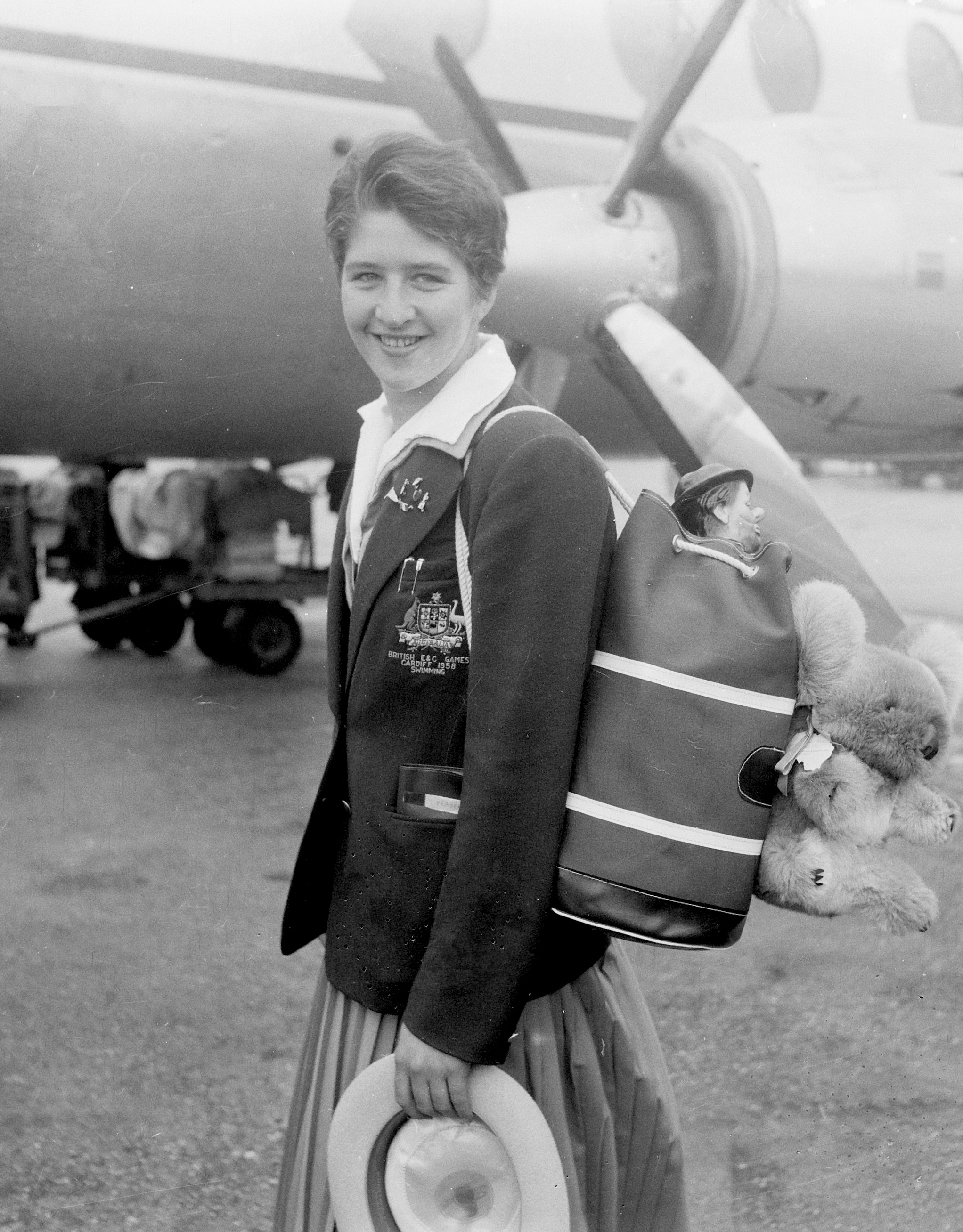
Dawn Fraser, winner of the 100-metre freestyle.
