= Lynne Allsup =

American swimmer (1949–2023)

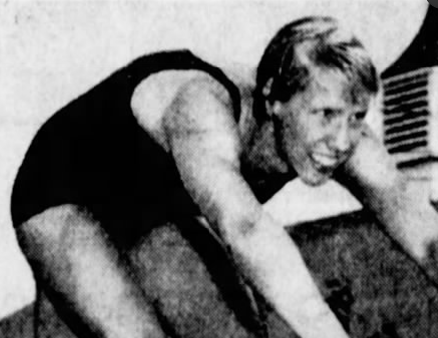
- Allsup readying for dive start, around 15, circa 1964

Personal information
- Full name: Lynne Marie Allsup
- National team: United States
- Born: January 2, 1949 Bloomington, Illinois, U.S.
- Died: May 17, 2023 (aged 74) Midland, Michigan, U.S.
- Height: 5 ft 4 in (163 cm)
- Weight: 130 lb (59 kg)

Sport
- Sport: Swimming
- Strokes: Freestyle
- Club: Bloomington Swim Club
- College team: Central Michigan University, 1971
- Coach: Jim Spreitzer (Bloomington Country Club)
Medal record
Women's swimming
Representing the United States
Summer Universiade
Gold medal – first place	1967 Tokyo	4x100 m freestyle
Silver medal – second place	1967 Tokyo	100 m freestyle

Lynne Marie Allsup (January 2, 1949 – May 16, 2023), also known by her married name Lynne Olson, was an American competition swimmer for Central Michigan University, and a 1964 Tokyo Olympic competitor in the Women's 4x100 meter freestyle relay preliminary heat. She was a national record-holder in the 100-yard freestyle, and was part of a world record 4x100-meter freestyle relay team on September 27, 1964 which swam a short-lived world record time of 4:07.6 in Los Angeles prior to the Tokyo Olympics.

== Early life and swimming ==
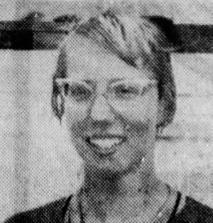
Allsup, age 14, August, 1963

Allsup was born in Bloomington, Illinois on January 2, 1949, to Ted Tozer Allsup and Bess Bernice Yost. Her older brother Morgan was also a competitive swimmer in Illinois specializing in butterfly. Lynne began swimming for YMCA teams and the Bloomington Country Club, beginning around the age of 8. As she matured, she swam for both Bloomington High School, and the Bloomington Swim Club, also known as the Bloomington Normal Swim Club, which is still active. Her coaches at the Bloomington Country Club, were Jim Spreitzer, who coached Lynne in 1964, and Archie Harris. An outstanding college freestyle swimmer, and talented young coach, Spreitzer won the 220 yard freestyle for the University of Illinois at the 1963 NCAA championships. He had harbored hopes of swimming in the 1964 Olympics before his swimming career ended after a rib fracture in 1963 in his college Senior year.

In one of her most noteworthy early meets, on August 18, 1963, at the Central AAU Junior Olympics Short Course in Bloomington, Allsup broke a Central AAU record in the 100-yard freestyle for girls 13-14 with the record time of :59.8. She would continue to set records in the event. Showing diversity in her stroke skills at the Intercity Meet sponsored by Allsup's Bloomington Swim Club on August 1, 1966, she won the 66 2/3 yards freestyle in a record time of :35.6, the 100-yard freestyle in 56.0, and the 133.3 individual medley. She broke two records at the Portage Park Invitational Senior Meet in Chicago, with a 20.5 in the 40-yard freestyle, and a 1:52.8 in the 160 yard individual medley on February 4–5, 1967.

== National 100-yard record ==
At the Central AAU Junior Olympic Short Course Championships in Bloomington, Illinois on August 9, 1964, Allsup broke the National AAU record for the 100-yard freestyle for girls 15-17, with a record time of 55.9. She would lower the record again in 1968. She also improved on the Central AAU record for the 200-yard freestyle with a record time of 2:09, although this was not considered a National record.

== World record 4x100-meter relay time ==
On September 27, 1964, Allsup swam the lead off leg of a short-lived long course 4x100-meter freestyle relay record of 4:07.6 with the team of Allsup, Kathy Seidel, Ericka Bricker, and Terri Stickles at a pre-Olympic meet in Los Angeles California. The U.S. Olympic team was training for the October Tokyo Olympics, and would depart for Tokyo three days later. The American team had such depth that year that the American Women's 4x100-meter Olympic finals team in Tokyo would break the 4:07.6 record by 3 seconds with four different swimmers.

== 1964 Tokyo Olympics ==
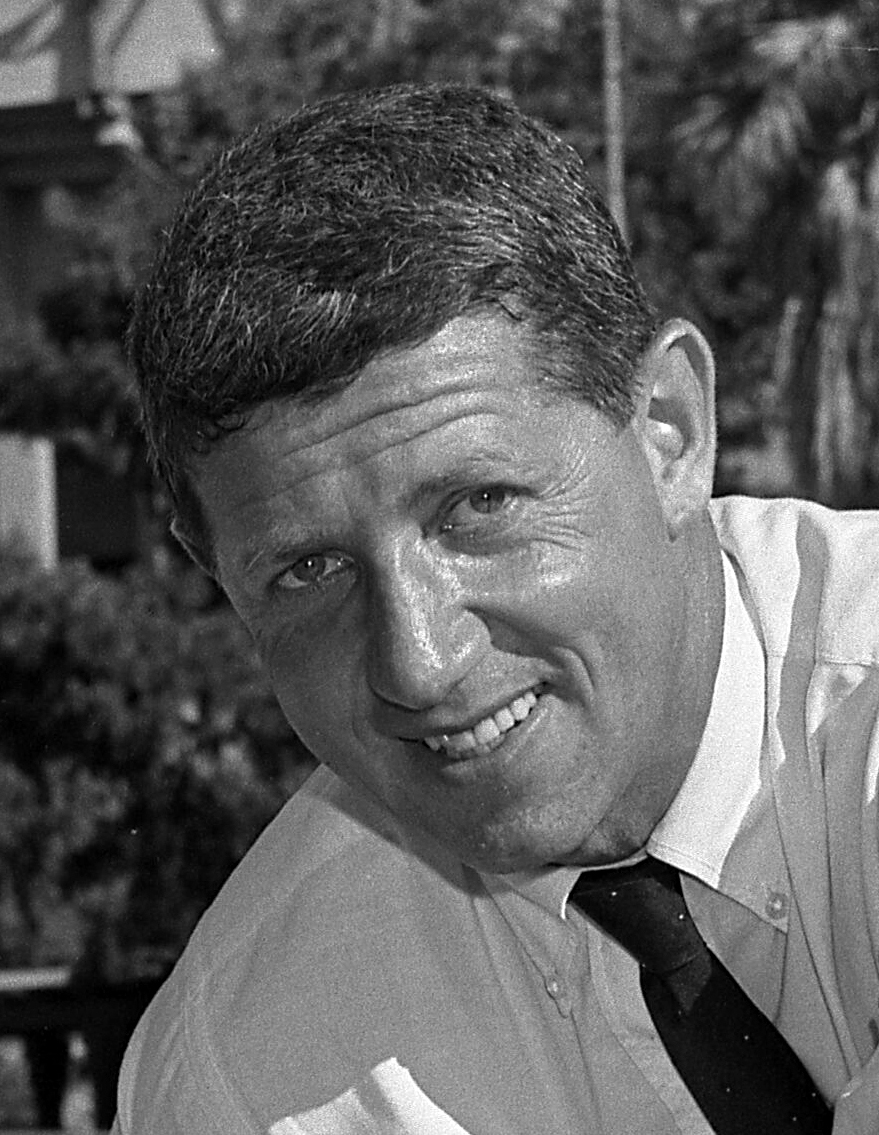
Peter Daland, 1964 Olympic Women's Coach

At the 1964 Olympic Trials in New York on September 3, 1964, Allsup tied for third in the 100-meter freestyle finals with a time of 1:01.6, qualifying for a position on the U.S. Women's freestyle relay team. Allsup was a 15-year-old Sophomore from Bloomington High School, and two other qualifiers, Kathy Seidel at 14, and Erika Bricker at 15 were equally young. Alsup subsequently trained with other members of the U.S. team in Palo Alto, and Los Angeles prior to the Olympics. The Head Women's Coach for the 1964 Olympics was Peter Daland, who coached the swim teams at the Los Angeles Athletic Club and the University of Southern California, and worked with Allsup and the U.S. Women's Olympic team during their training in Los Angeles and later in Tokyo.

After departing on a flight to Tokyo on September 30, Allsup represented the United States at the mid-October 1964 Summer Olympics. She swam for the gold medal-winning U.S. team in the preliminary heats of the women's 4×100-meter freestyle relay. She swam the third leg with the 4x100 preliminary relay team of Jeanne Hallock, Erika Bricker and anchor Patience Sherman, who won their preliminary heat with a combined time of 4:12.2, qualifying the America women for the final heat. The relay finals team for the 4x100 freestyle consisted of Sharon Stouder, followed by Donna de Varona, Pokey Watson, and Kathy Ellis, who swam a noteworthy World Record time of 4:03.8. with lead off swimmer Sharon Stouder taking a commanding lead to help clinch the gold. Allsup did not receive a medal under the 1964 international swimming rules because she did not compete in the relay event final.

== Post-Olympic swimming ==
On August 14, 1966, Allsup bettered her National record in the 100-yard freestyle with a time of 54.5 seconds at the Central AAU Short Course Swimming Championships at Illinois State. She bettered her former national record of :55.0.

On August 21, 1966, while competing for the Bloomington Normal Swim Club, she swam a 1:01.8 for the 100-meter freestyle, placing 5th at the National AAU Swim Championships in Lincoln, Nebraska. The women's competition was dominated by Californians, particularly Claudia Kolb, who set a world record in the 200-meter individual medley, and Pokey Watson of the Santa Clara Swim Club, who set an American record in the 100-meter freestyle of 59.9.

=== Summer Universiade ===
Returning to Japan in 1967, Allsup swam in the Summer Universiade in Toko, also known as the Student University Games, where she won a gold in the 4x100-meter freestyle relay, and a silver in the 100-meter freestyle.

=== Central Michigan University ===
Allsup attended and swam for Central Michigan University, graduating in 1971 with a degree in School Health. In addition to swimming with Central Michigan's swim team in the fall, she competed with the Volleyball team. In the summers, Allsup trained with the Indianapolis Riviera Club. She performed well at the National Women's Intercollegiate Swimming Championships on November 23, 1968 in East Lansing, Michigan, where she won both the 50 and 100-yard freestyle events for Central Michigan. Though only swimming as a freshman, Allsup broke her own collegiate record for the 100-yard freestyle at the 1968 Championship, setting a new national collegiate record of 55.04, though she had previously set a national record of 54.5. While at Central Michigan State, she again competed in the National Women's Intercollegiate Swimming and Diving Championships at Illinois State University in May 1970. As she did not swim year round with her college team, she lacked the conditioning to qualify for the 1968 Olympics, and did not make the U.S. team.

=== Honors ===
On November 1, 1964, at the Bloomington Normal Swim Club Banquet, Allsup received the Blankley Award for the Illinois Swimmer of the Year, the Cenaaur Award for the outstanding Central AAU swimmer, and the Morse Trophy for the local swimmer with the best individual race.

=== Later life ===
Allsup taught High School for a few years near Midland, Michigan after graduating college. She entered Masters Swimming as therapy after knee surgery. She trained and competed with Michigan Masters mostly between 1976 and 1989, competing in freestyle, backstroke and butterfly events. In 1983, she had several top 10 relay swims in the 200 freestyle and 200 medley events.

While training with Michigan Masters, part of United States Masters Swimming, she met her husband, Richard Olson in the early 1980's. A fellow athlete, Olson had been a marathon runner before taking up swimming. The couple were married in Sanford, Michigan, on June 29, 1985 at Sanford United Methodist Church. At the time of her wedding in 1985, Lynne Allsup Olson was employed by Dow Chemical in Midland, Michigan. Her husband Richard had a Bachelors and Masters Degree from the University of North Dakota and worked as a teacher at Bullock Creek High School in Sanford, Michigan. The couple continued to live in Sanford about ten miles Northwest of Midland, Michigan where Lynne worked. Lynne continued working for Dow Chemical at least through 1996.

Allsup was an avid cyclist, taking trips with her husband Richard in Minnesota, and Wisconsin, and also enjoyed hiking in the Western United States and Canada. At home she greatly enjoyed gardening.

She died in the early morning of May 17, 2023, at Independence Village of Midland, and had been pre-deceased by Richard Odell Olson, her husband of 27 years, in 2012.

== See also ==
- World record progression 4 × 100 metres freestyle relay
