= Sandra Nitta =

American former competition swimmer (born 1949)

Personal information
- Full name: Sandra Haruta Nitta
- Nickname: "Sandra"
- National team: United States
- Born: April 21, 1949 (age 77) Burbank, California, U.S.
- Height: 5 ft 1 in (1.55 m)
- Weight: 115 lb (52 kg)

Sport
- Sport: Swimming
- Strokes: Breaststroke
- Club: Commerce Swim Club
- Coach: Don Gambril

Sandy Nitta Water Polo Coach and Player
Playing career
- 1960-1967: Los Angeles Athletic Club; City of Commerce Club
- 1968-1969: Long Beach Water Polo
- 1966-1967: Southern Pacific Zone; Fall Age Group League
- Position: Water Polo

Coaching career (HC unless noted)
- 1970-1980: City of Commerce; Water Polo
- 1980-1994: U.S. Women's National Water Polo Team
- 1979-1980: Wilson High J.V. Coach
- 1981-1982: Queensland, AUS; Team Coach
- 1990-1991: Rio Hondo College; Whittier, CA; Water Polo Coach
- 1994-1999 2004-2014: Team Vegas/Henderson

Accomplishments and honors

Championships
- World Championships; Bronze medals 1986, 1991; World Cup; Silver Medals 1980, 1983, 1984 (U.S. Women's National Team)

Awards
- 1998 U.S. Water Polo Hall of Fame; 2012 Paragon Award

Alexandra Hauka Nitta (born April 24, 1949), usually referred to as "Sandra" or "Sandy" is an American former competition swimmer who represented the United States in the 100-meter breaststroke as a 15-year-old at the 1964 Summer Olympics in Tokyo, Japan. Highly instrumental in the development and advancement of women's Water Polo in America, she had a forty-year career as a water polo coach, and administrator with an induction into the USA Water Polo Hall of Fame in 1998. In her longest coaching assignments, she was the US Women's National Team Water Polo coach from 1980 to 1994, and coached Team Vegas/Henderson from 1994 to 1999 and from 2000 to 2014, later serving as a Director.

== Early swimming ==
Coach Don Gambril, 1984

Sandy swam for California's Montebello High School, and was an outstanding age group swimmer for Southern California's Commerce Swim Club under Hall of Fame Coach Don Gambril. From the age of 13 through 17, she usually swam twice a day totaling around eight miles daily. At the age of 12, she swam and competed for the Monterey Park Novice Team, but by 1964 at the age of around 15, Sandy began swimming for Gambrill's Rosemead Swim Club or his City of Commerce Swim Club which Gambrill took over around 1965.

Commerce City swimmers often attended national championships and had an exceptional women's team that in addition to Sandy included 1964 Olympians Sharon Stouder, Patty Caretto, and Jeanne Hallock Craig. To maintain conditioning, Sandy played water polo in the off-season, though she swam year round many years. She was named to the All-American AAU swim team in 1964–65, and in 1966 she was again named to the All-America girl's High School Swim Team.

== 1964 AAU Nationals ==
Sandy set a qualifying time of 1:22.3 for the Olympic Trials in the 100-meter breastroke at the AAU National Outdoor Swimming Championships in Los Altos, California on August 1, 1964. The prior day at the National Championships in Los Altos, she swam a 2:53.5 in the Women's 200-meter breastroke. Her City of Commerce teammates – Jeanne Hallock and Sharon Stouder – also performed well in the meet.

== 1964 Tokyo Olympics ==
=== Olympic Trials ===
In the late August 1964 Olympic Trials in New York, Sandy placed third in the 200-meter breaststroke, behind Tammy Hazleton, and first place Claudia Kolb of Santa Clara, whose time was only a half second behind the listed American record.

=== Tokyo Olympics ===
Flying to Tokyo with the team, Nitta swam in the qualifying heats of the women's 200-meter breaststroke at the 1964 Olympics and posted a time of 2:48.4, which was the 18th fastest time, and did not make the cut for the final round of eight.

=== 1966 Canadian Record at Pacific Championships ===
With an exceptional team, her Commerce Swim Club Coach Don Gambril entered five of his women swimmers in the Pacific Swimming and Diving Championships in Vancouver in March, 1966. Commerce teammate Patty Caretto set a Canadian record for the 400 meters, and Sandy took victories in both the 100 and 200-meter breaststroke (2:51.8), with a Canadian record in the 100-meter event of 1:19.0. City of Commerce teammate Sharon Stouder handily won the 100-meter freestyle.

=== Education ===
Sandy attended and graduated Cal State Los Angeles University, but also attended Pasadena and East Los Angeles Colleges.

== Competing as a Water Polo Player ==
Competing mostly during her High School years for Water Polo Clubs strictly as a club player, she never played water polo for her High School or Colleges. In Club play, she competed with the Los Angeles Athletic Club and the City of Commerce teams from 1960 to 1967, and then played for Long Beach Water Polo from 1968 to 1969 as part of the Phillips 66 team where she also competed in swimming. In the Fall, she played in the Southern Pacific Zone's age group league, between 1960 and 1967. She continued as an occasional club player through 1980.

She was in the AAU National Senior Indoor Championships in 1968.

== Coaching Water Polo ==
In her early career, Sandy worked as a lifeguard for the city of Commerce and served as a coach for novice swimmers at Commerce Swim Club. As early as around 1968, she coached water polo in the off season to those swimmers that took an interest, which eventually led to a career as a water polo coach.

== City of Commerce water polo coach ==
In her earliest years coaching Water Polo, Sandy helped found and coached the City of Commerce Water Polo Team, from 1970 to 1980 where she had been a competitive swimmer, formally establishing the team in 1971. In her first year of coaching, she led the City of Commerce Water Polo Team to win their first National Junior Championship. She led the team to National prominence, and having gained recognition, she began national coaching as the first Woman's USA Water Polo Junior National Head Coach in 1979. During her earlier years of coaching with the City of Commerce Club, the position was unpaid, and Sandy made a portion of her income as a professional gambler, a profession she later pursued during her long coaching career in Las Vegas. She also had investments which gave her income including ownership of a hotel in Las Vegas.

== U.S. Women's National Water Polo Team coach ==
In one of her most formative coaching experiences in 1980, Nitta became Head Coach of the U.S. Women's National Water Polo Team, remaining there until 1994. It was not until 1986, when Women's Water Polo was recognized as an official sport at the Fina World Championships. The women's sport would not be part of Olympic competition until the 2000 Olympics, though the team began training in earnest by 1995.

=== Women's National team championships ===
In its early years under Coach Nitta, the team received a bronze medal in 1986 and 1991 in the World Championships and silver medals in World Cup competition in 1980, 1983, and 1984. One of her players prior to 1984, Brenda Villa, made the winning goal in a game against Italy in 1990 which qualified the United States Women's Water Polo team to attend the Olympics. In 1997, Sandy also helped recruit Maureen O'Toole, who became a valuable member of the 2000 Olympic Team. The Women's team did not make an Olympic appearance until the 2000 Sydney Olympics where the Australian team took the gold medal over the United States team, with six nations competing.

During her tenure, Sandy faced challenges due to limited corporate and government funding. Through 1994, Women's Water Polo was not an Olympic Sport and members of the team had to pay their own way for international travel. Outstanding distance swimmer and author Lynne Cox served as the U.S. Women's team's manager, attempting to raise corporate funds. In 1984, the team was pushing to gain recognition by the IOC as an Olympic participant. During Nitta's tenure as head coach through 1994, the National Women's Water Polo team had not gained access to the Olympics as a participant, but gained admission in 2000, and have since received the gold medal in the 2012, 2016, and 2020 Olympics.

=== Other Water Polo teams coached ===
She coached Team Vegas/Henderson from 1994 to 1999 and 2004–14. In shorter assignments, she was the Wilson High School JV Coach from 1979 to 1980, the Queensland, Australia State Team Coach from 1981 to 1982, and was Head Coach at Rio Hondo College from 1990 to 1991.

Her international coaching experience in Water Polo included the Brazilian Women's team. Sandy coached in the first Pan Am Water Polo Game for Women, and coached the Brazilian Team to their first win ever over the United States Team. She coached the Tualatain Water Polo Club in Oregon, and later coached a Masters team to the 2006 Women's Masters World Championships.

Sandy hosted the first International Women's Water Polo Tournament in Commerce, California on December 27–29, 19977 at the Commerce Aquatorium with teams competing from the United States, Canada, Mexico, Holland, and Australia, which paved the way for additional international events for women in the following years. Commerce also hosted the AAU Women's Water Polo Indoor National Championships on December 16–18 at the Commerce Aquatorium.

In 2017, she returned to coaching at Team Vegas/Henderson Water Polo, a Junior Olympic Program, and would serve as a Director of the program.

=== Water Polo Community service and administration ===
Sandy worked as a Water Polo referee, receiving an "A" rating in Senior, Junior, Collegiate, and Junior Olympic National Championships from 1979 to 1990. She was the Water Polo Women's International Chairperson from 1976 to 1979, and served as a member of the Women's International Committee, as well as the United States Water Polo Inc. Rules, Laws, and Legislation Committee. She also served on the Long Range Planning Committee, and the National Referee's Committee. Sandy served on the FINA sub-committee which successfully promoted women's water polo on the global stage, and helped make rule changes for the women's sport which included a smaller ball, and a shorter course.

=== Water Polo honors ===
She was inducted into the American Water Polo Hall of Fame in 1998 and in 2012 received a Paragon Award for her work in American Water Polo.

As a tribute to Sandy's contributions to American Water Polo, the Sandy Nitta Distinguished Coaching Award was established, which annually recognizes coaching excellence in the sport.
