= Swimming at the 1967 Pan American Games – Women's 100 metre freestyle =

Women's 100 metre freestyle at the 1967 Pan American Games
- Venue: Pan Am Pool
- Dates: July 30 (preliminaries and finals)
- Competitors: from - nations

Medalists
Gold medal	Erika Bricker	United States
Silver medal	Marion Lay	Canada
Bronze medal	Lillian Watson	United States

The women's 100 metre freestyle competition of the swimming events at the 1967 Pan American Games took place on 30 July at the Pan Am Pool. The last Pan American Games champion was Terri Stickles of US.

This race consisted of two lengths of the pool, both lengths being in freestyle.

== Results ==
All times are in minutes and seconds.

KEY:	q	Fastest non-qualifiers	Q	Qualified	GR	Games record	NR	National record	PB	Personal best	SB	Seasonal best

=== Final ===
The final was held on July 30.

Rank	Name	Nationality	Time	Notes
1st place, gold medalist(s)	Erika Bricker	United States	1:00.9	
2nd place, silver medalist(s)	Marion Lay	Canada	1:01.0	
3rd place, bronze medalist(s)	Lillian Watson	United States	1:01.5	
4	Elaine Tanner	Canada	1:02.8	
5	-	-	-	
6	-	-	-	
7	-	-	-	
8	Eliete Mota	Brazil	1:08.1	
