= Monique Piétri =

French swimmer

Personal information
- Born: 20 April 1945
- Died: 25 June 1993 (aged 48)

Sport
- Sport: Swimming

Monique Piétri (20 April 1945 – 25 June 1993) was a French swimmer. She competed in the women's 100 metre freestyle at the 1964 Summer Olympics in Tokyo, Japan.
