= Christl Paukerl =

Austrian swimmer

Personal information
- Born: 22 November 1946 (age 79)

Sport
- Sport: Swimming

Christl Paukerl (born 22 November 1946) is an Austrian former swimmer. She competed in the women's 100 metre freestyle at the 1964 Summer Olympics.
