= Im Geum-ja =

South Korean swimmer

Personal information
- Born: 20 April 1947 (age 79)

Sport
- Sport: Swimming
- Strokes: freestyle

Im Geum-ja (born 20 April 1947) is a South Korean former freestyle swimmer. She competed in two events at the 1964 Summer Olympics.
