= Puerto Rico at the 1964 Summer Olympics =

- IOC code: PUR
- NOC: Puerto Rico Olympic Committee

in Tokyo
- Competitors: 32 (30 men and 2 women) in 8 sports
- Flag bearer: Rolando Cruz
- Medals: Gold 0 Silver 0 Bronze 0 Total 0

Summer Olympics appearances (overview)
- 1948; 1952; 1956; 1960; 1964; 1968; 1972; 1976; 1980; 1984; 1988; 1992; 1996; 2000; 2004; 2008; 2012; 2016; 2020; 2024; 2028

Puerto Rico competed at the 1964 Summer Olympics in Tokyo, Japan. 32 competitors, 30 men and 2 women, took part in 29 events in 8 sports. The Games were hosted from 11 to 24 October.

== Athletics ==
Men's Pole Vault

- Rolando Cruz

== Diving ==
Men

Athlete	Event	Preliminary		Final			
Athlete	Event	Points	Rank	Points	Rank	Total	Rank
Jerry Anderson	3 m springboard	81.07	22	Did not advance			
Jerry Anderson	10 m platform	79.54	27	Did not advance			

== Shooting ==
Three shooters represented Puerto Rico in 1964.

25 m pistol

- Leon Lyon

50 m pistol

- Fred Guillermety

Trap

- Jaime Loyola

== Swimming ==
Men

Athlete	Event	Heat		Semifinal		Final	
Athlete	Event	Time	Rank	Time	Rank	Time	Rank
Elliot Chenaux	1500 m freestyle	18:33.1	26	—N/a		Did not advance	
Elliot Chenaux	200 m backstroke	2:33.1	32	Did not advance			
Elliot Chenaux	200 m breaststroke	2:52.5	33	Did not advance			
Elliot Chenaux	400 m individual medley	5:11.3	21	—N/a		Did not advance	
Celestino Pérez	100 m freestyle	1:01.3	65	Did not advance			
Celestino Pérez	400 m freestyle	4:30.9	27	—N/a		Did not advance	
Celestino Pérez	1500 m freestyle	18:07.2	17	—N/a		Did not advance	
Celestino Pérez	400 m individual medley	5:10.9	18	—N/a		Did not advance	

Women

Athlete	Event	Heat		Semifinal		Final	
Athlete	Event	Time	Rank	Time	Rank	Time	Rank
Margaret Harding	100 m freestyle	1:11.7	42	Did not advance			
Margaret Harding	100 m backstroke	1:19.5	29	—N/a		Did not advance	
Margaret Harding	200 m breaststroke	3:16.0	25	—N/a		Did not advance	
Margaret Harding	100 m butterfly	1:23.7	31	Did not advance			
Margaret Harding	400 m individual medley	6:10.7	21	—N/a		Did not advance	
Ann Lallande	100 m freestyle	1:06.8	39	Did not advance			
Ann Lallande	400 m freestyle	5:04.3	17	—N/a		Did not advance	
Ann Lallande	100 m butterfly	1:17.1	29	Did not advance			
