= Erika Bricker =

American swimmer

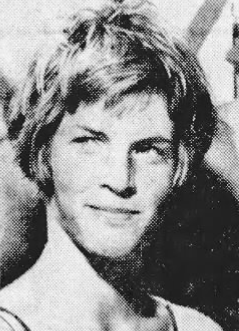
- Bricker at 18, circa 1967

Personal information
- Full name: Erika Eloise Bricker
- National team: United States
- Born: May 23, 1949 (age 77) Woodland, California, U.S.
- Height: 5 ft 11 in (1.80 m)
- Weight: 149 lb (68 kg)

Sport
- Sport: Swimming
- Strokes: Freestyle
- Club: City of Commerce; Los Angeles Athletic Club
- Coach: Don Gambril (City of Commerce)
Medal record
Women's swimming
Representing the United States
Pan American Games
Gold medal – first place	1967 Winnipeg	100 m freestyle

Erika Eloise Bricker (born May 23, 1949), also known by her married name Erika Holderith, is an American former competition swimmer, 1964 Olympic participant, and Pan American Games gold medalist.

Bricker was born in Woodland, California on May 23, 1949 to Mr. John Bricker and Mrs. Sepi Bricker. Her father was a swim coach at the College of the Sequoias, and her brother Bruce was a Junior College All America swimmer. She attended Mount Whitney High School in Visalia, and began serious competition at age 13.

While swimming for Mount Whitney High School, she won the San Joaquin Valley titles in the 100-yard freestyle, and individual medley as a Freshman, and helped bring her team to the championship by capturing first place in the 100 and 200-yard freestyle events as a Sophomore. She was ranked ninth in the 100-meter in 1964, and in 1965 was ranked eighth with a time of 1:02.2. She trained with the City of Commerce swimming team under Hall of Fame Coach Don Gambril in her Junior year with Olympians Sharon Stouder and Patty Caretto. In 1966, she swam with the Los Angeles Athletic Club. In her Senior Year, she attended Visalia's Redwood High School and in January 1968 was named to the All America team in the 100-yard and 100-meter freestyle events, as well as the 400-yard, and 400-meter freestyle, and Medley Relay teams.

== 1964 Tokyo Olympics ==
At the 1964 Summer Olympics in Tokyo, Bricker represented the United States as a 15-year-old high school student. She was managed at the Olympics by 1964 U.S. Women's Olympic Head Swimming Coach Peter Daland and swam for the gold medal-winning U.S. team in the preliminary heats of the women's 4×100-meter freestyle relay, but did not receive a medal. Under the rules in effect in 1964, only those relay swimmers who competed in the event final were eligible to receive medals.

In April, 1966, she swam a 53.8 in the 100-yard freestyle, placing second to Martha Randall at the AAU Indoor Championships.

In 1967, she won the AAU indoor title in the 100 freestyle.

== 1967 Pan American Games ==
At 17, she also competed in the July 1967 Pan American Games in Winnipeg, where she received a gold medal in the 100-meter freestyle final swimming a winning 1:00.9, and edging Marion Lay and Lillian Watson in the event. She previously swam the 100-meter in a preliminary heat in :59.9 becoming only the fourth woman to break the minute for the 100.

As Erika Holderith, she later settled in Asheville, North Carolina.

In 1977, she worked as an Engineering aide for the City of San Juan, Capistrano having majored in Civil Engineering at California State University in Los Angeles where she lived for ten years after her swimming career. She moved to Dana Point in 1977. In 1974, she had a business marketing sea urchins, and had formerly worked as a bank teller, swimming instructor and bookeeper.

== Honors ==
She was inducted into Visalia California's Heritage Court Pillars of Fame in 2007, a Hall of Fame for athletes at Riverway Sports Park .
