= Traudi Beierlein =

German swimmer

Personal information
- Born: 27 September 1941 (age 84) Graz, Austria

Sport
- Sport: Swimming

Traudi Beierlein (born 27 September 1941) is a German former swimmer. She competed in two events at the 1964 Summer Olympics.
