= Martina Grunert =

East German swimmer (born 1949)

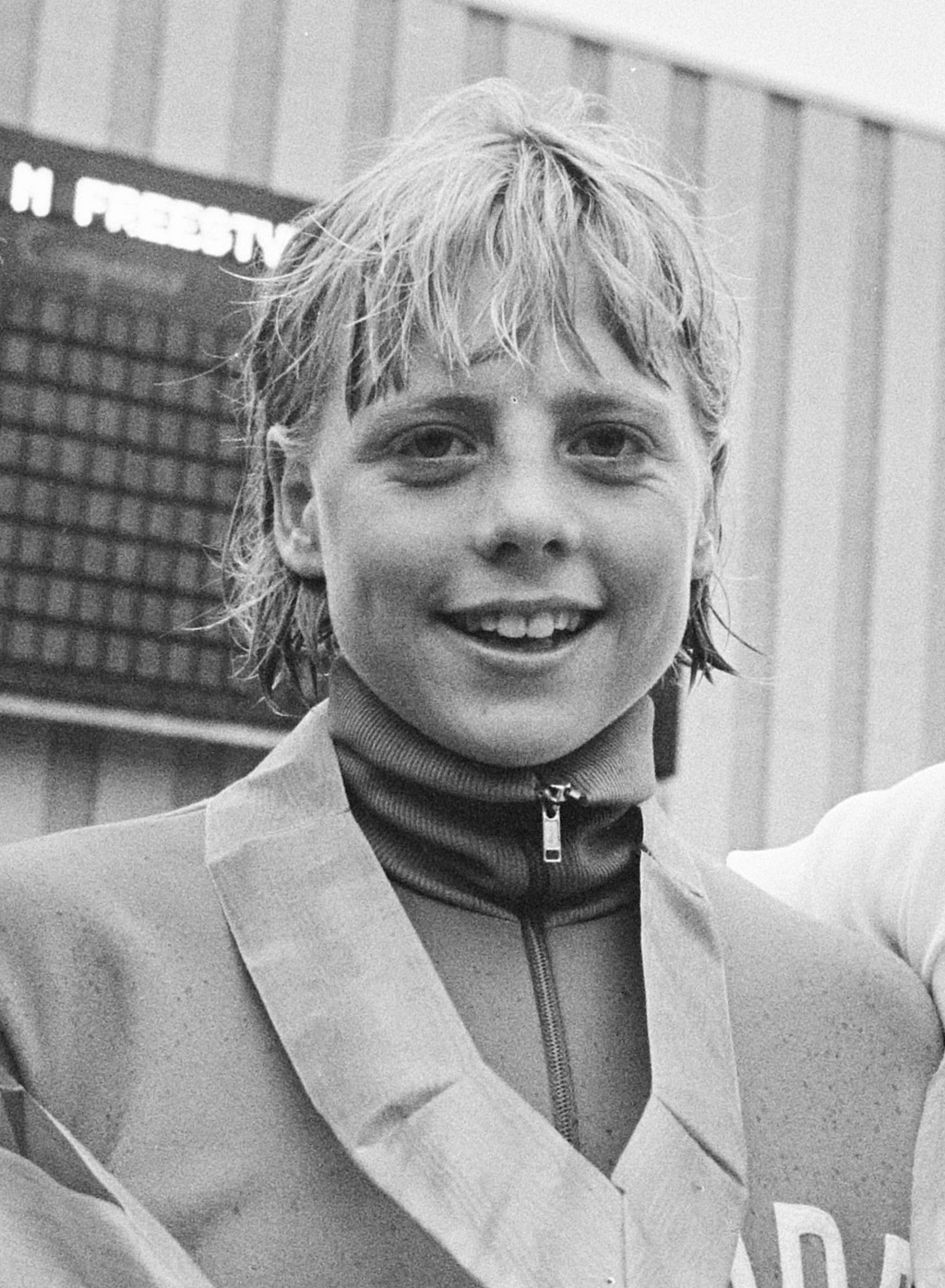
- Martina Grunert in 1966

Medal record

Women's swimming

Representing East Germany

Olympic Games
Silver medal – second place	1968 México	4×100 m freestyle

European Championships
Gold medal – first place	1966 Utrecht	100m freestyle
Gold medal – first place	1970 Barcelona	200m medley

Martina Grunert (later Koch then Abresch; born 17 May 1949 in Leipzig) is a retired German swimmer who participated in the 1964 and 1968 Summer Olympics. As a part of the 4 × 100 m freestyle relay team she was sixth in 1964 and won a silver medal in 1968. Her best individual achievement was fifth place in 100 m freestyle in 1968. She also won two gold medals in the European Aquatics Championships: 100 m freestyle (1966) and 200 m medley (1970).
