= Judit Turóczy =

Hungarian swimmer (born 1948)

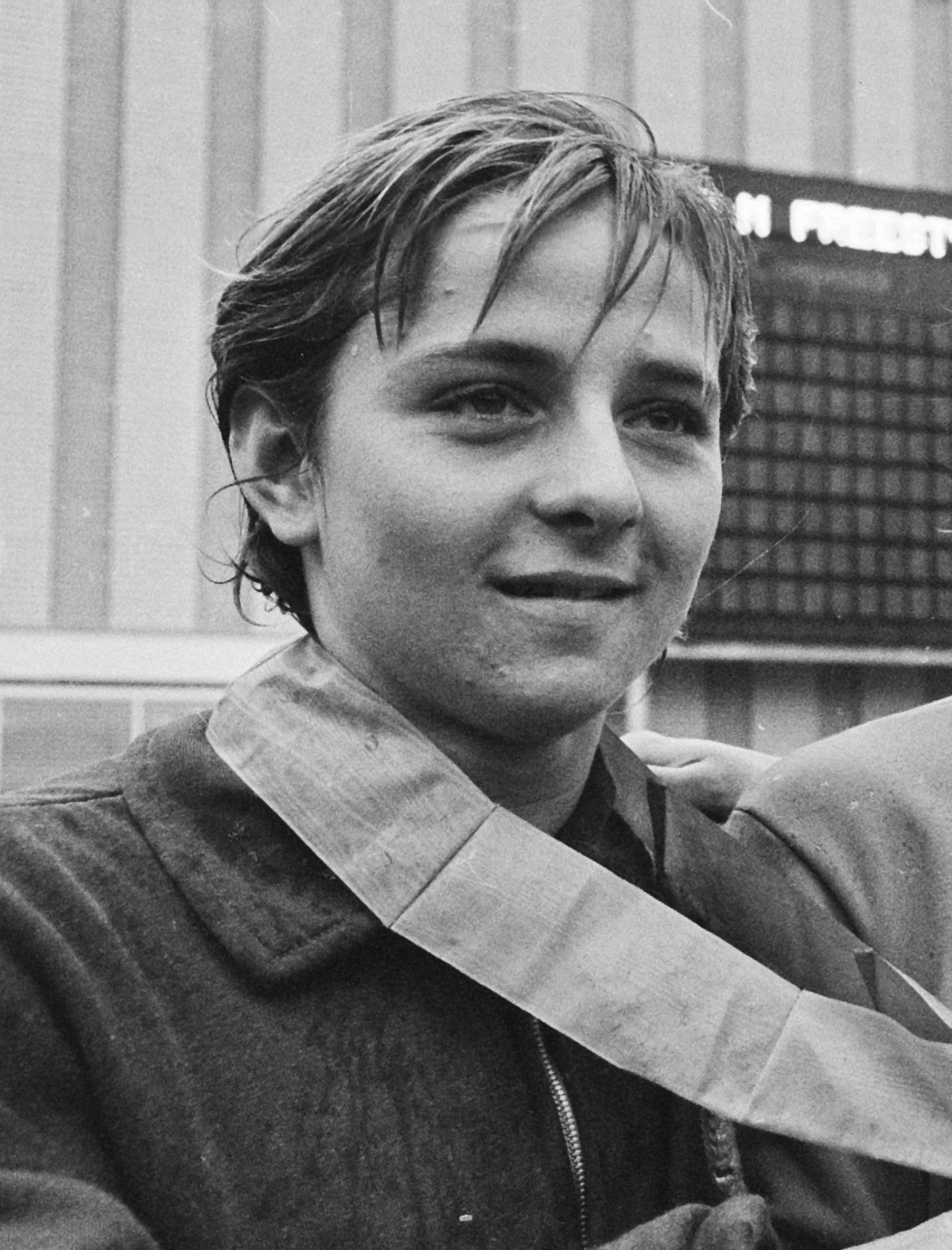
- Judit Turóczy in 1966

Personal information
- Full name: Turóczy Judit
- Nationality: Hungarian
- Born: March 11, 1948 (age 78) Budapest
- Height: 1.62 m (5 ft 4 in)
- Weight: 55 kg (121 lb)

Sport
- Sport: Swimming
- Strokes: freestyle
- Club: BVSC
Medal record
European Championships (LC)
Silver medal – second place	1966 Utrecht	100 m freestyle
Silver medal – second place	1970 Barcelona	4×100 m freestyle

Judit Turóczy (also known as Korach; born March 11, 1948, in Budapest) is a former freestyle swimmer from Hungary, who competed in three consecutive Summer Olympics for her native country, starting in 1964.

Her best individual result was eighth, achieved at the 1968 Olympic Games in 100 metres freestyle. With the Hungarian 4×100 metres freestyle relay team she was fourth at the 1964 and the 1972 Games and fifth in 1968.

At the European Championships she won two silver medals.
