= Rita Schumacher =

German swimmer

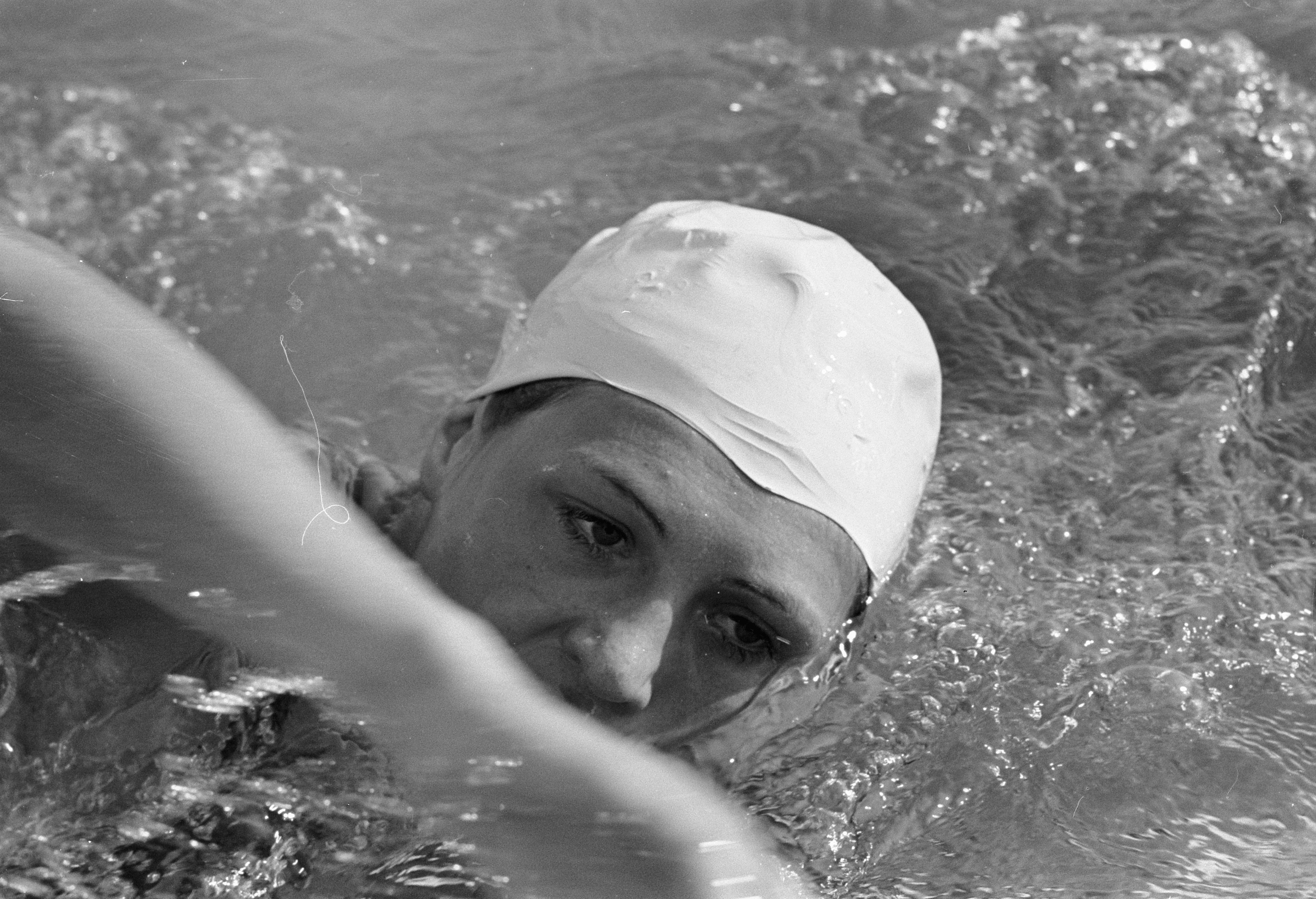
- Rita Schuhmacher at 1966 European Aquatics Championships

Personal information
- Born: 25 August 1947 (age 78) Rostock, Germany

Sport
- Sport: Swimming

Rita Schumacher (born 25 August 1947) is a German former swimmer. She competed in two events at the 1964 Summer Olympics.
