= Pauline van der Wildt =

Dutch swimmer

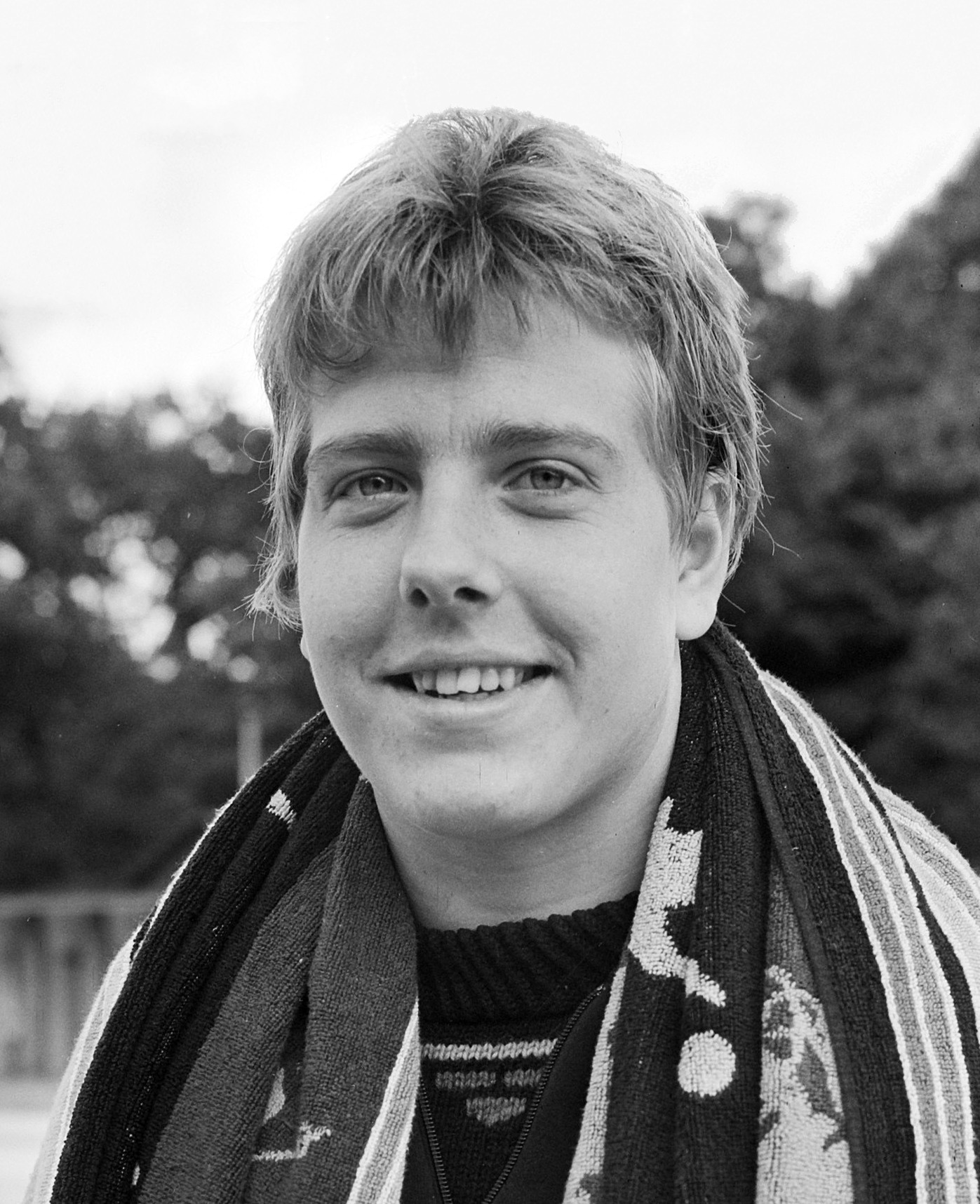
- Pauline van der Wildt in 1964

Personal information
- Born: 29 January 1944 (age 82) Schiedam, the Netherlands
- Height: 1.77 m (5 ft 10 in)
- Weight: 73 kg (161 lb)

Sport
- Sport: Swimming
- Club: SZC, Schiedam
Medal record
Representing the Netherlands
Olympic Games
Bronze medal – third place	1964 Tokyo	4×100 m freestyle relay

Paulina ("Pauline") Jacoba van der Wildt (born 29 January 1944) is a retired Dutch swimmer who won a bronze medal in the 4 × 100 m freestyle relay at the 1964 Summer Olympics. Her teammates in that race, who clocked in at 4:12, were Toos Beumer, Erica Terpstra and Winnie van Weerdenburg.
