= Éva Erdélyi =

Hungarian swimmer (1943–1978)

Personal information
- Nationality: Hungarian
- Born: 15 September 1943 Eger, Hungary
- Died: 17 March 1978 (aged 34) Budapest, Hungary

Sport
- Sport: Swimming
Medal record
Representing Hungary
Summer Universiade
Gold medal – first place	1965 Budapest	4x100m freestyle relay
Bronze medal – third place	1965 Budapest	100m butterfly

Éva Erdélyi (15 September 1943 – 17 March 1978) was a Hungarian swimmer. She competed for Hungary in the 1964 Olympic Games on the 4x100 meter freestyle relay. Between 1961 and 1965, Erdelyi participated as a member of the national swim team ten times altogether. In 1961, she won a gold medal at the Italian-Hungarian swimming competition in San Remo, and as a member of the 4×100 meter freestyle team at the Hungarian National Championship, she finished in third place.

In 1962, at the British-Hungarian Swimming Competition, as a member of the 4×100 meter freestyle relay, she won a gold medal. In the same year, in Piesteritzben at the East Germany – Hungary meeting she won a gold medal at the 100 meter freestyle.

She competed for her native country in the 1964 Olympic Games on the 4x100 meter freestyle relay. The team finished in 4th place. For her performance the Hungarian People's Republic granted her a Sporting Merit Silver Standard.

In 1965, at the annual Universiade (an international sport event specifically organized for university students by the International University Sports Federation) in Budapest, Hungary, on the 4x100 meter freestyle relay she won a gold and a bronze medal on 100 meter butterfly.

She earned a teaching degree in Hungarian literature, history, and physical education and later worked as a museologist.

In 1978, she was burned in an accidental gas explosion and died. In her hometown, the annual Pro Agria Swimming Competition is dedicated to the town's most outstanding swimmers. Four events within the competition were established in memory of Eva Erdelyi and in 2010 the city of Eger named a street after her.

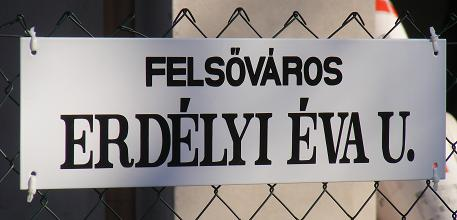
Eva Erdelyi's Street Sign

In 2015, she was included in the "Whom We Are Proud" initiative by Hungarian university, the Eszterházy Károly Katolikus Egyetem.

In 2024, Eva Erdelyi was among the 14 Olympians the local university in Eger, Hungary included in their new Gallery Wall of Olympians from Eger."

== Sport Performances ==
- 1964 Olympic Games, Tokyo (4×100 meter freestyle team, 4th place)
- 1965 Universiade (4×100 meter freestyle team, gold medal)
- 1965 Universiade (100 meter butterfly, bronze medal)
- 1965 Universiade (100 meter freestyle, 5th place)
