= Ryoko Urakami =

Japanese swimmer (born 1947)

Personal information
- Born: 30 May 1947 (age 79)

Sport
- Sport: Swimming
- Strokes: freestyle
Medal record
Representing Japan
Asian Games
Gold medal – first place	1966 Bangkok	4x100m freestyle relay

Ryoko Urakami (浦上 涼子, Urakami Ryōko; born 30 May 1947) is a Japanese former freestyle swimmer. At the 1964 Summer Olympics she competed in the 100 meter freestyle race, and the 4 × 400 meter freestyle relay with fellow swimmers Toyoko Kimura, Miyoko Azuma, and Michiko Kihara. She did not advance in either category.
