= Margaret Harding (swimmer) =

Puerto Rican swimmer (born 1948)

Personal information
- Born: 22 February 1948 (age 78)

Sport
- Sport: Swimming
Medal record
Representing Puerto Rico
Central American and Caribbean Games
Gold medal – first place	1966 San Juan	100m breaststroke
Gold medal – first place	1966 San Juan	200m individual medley
Gold medal – first place	1966 San Juan	400m individual medley
Gold medal – first place	1966 San Juan	4x100m freestyle relay

Margaret Harding (born 22 February 1948) is a Puerto Rican former swimmer. She competed in five events at the 1964 Summer Olympics.
