= Helen Kennedy (swimmer) =

Canadian swimmer (born 1949)

Personal information
- Born: 16 August 1949 (age 77) London, Ontario, Canada

Sport
- Sport: Swimming
Medal record
Representing Canada
British Empire and Commonwealth Games
Gold medal – first place	1966 Kingston	4×110yd freestyle relay
Silver medal – second place	1966 Kingston	4×110yd medley relay

Helen Louise Kennedy (born 16 August 1949) is a Canadian former backstroke, butterfly, freestyle and medley swimmer. She competed in six events at the 1964 Summer Olympics.
