= Jeanne Hallock =

American swimmer (born 1946)

- Hallock circa 1965

Personal information
- Full name: Jeanne Courtney Hallock
- National team: United States
- Born: December 26, 1946 (age 79) Los Angeles, California, U.S.
- Height: 5 ft 8 in (1.73 m)
- Weight: 134 lb (61 kg)

Sport
- Sport: Swimming
- Strokes: Freestyle
- Club: Rosemead Swim Club; Commerce Swim Club
- College team: USC (Did not swim)
- Coach: Don Gambril

Jeanne Courtney Hallock (born December 26, 1946), also known by her married name Jeanne Craig, is an American former club, high school, and Olympic competition swimmer who was voted to the AAU All America team twice. Serving as the U.S. team Co-Captain, she swam in the preliminary heats of the gold medal-winning women's 4×100-meter freestyle relay in the 1964 Tokyo Olympics, though she did receive a medal as she did not swim in the finals. She also swam in the 1964 Olympic preliminaries for the 100-meter freestyle, her signature event, but did not make the finals.

== Early life ==
Coach Don Gambril, 1984

Jeanne was born in the Los Angeles area on December 26, 1946, to "Hallie" and John Hallock. Her father was a Civil engineer for Davidson and Mauer. She began swimming by age 11, and took early lessons with the Jack Roth Swim School. Graduating around 1964, she attended Arcadia High School, where her Rosemead Swim Club coach Don Gambril would teach History as well as coach swimming and Football beginning around 1963.

During her early swimming career, 1964 Olympic gold medalist Sharon Stouder was a swimming companion at the Rosemead Club and lived nearby. At Arcadia, she enjoyed music, and was a member of the Acapella Choir, and a Dance Group. Diverse in her mastery of strokes, by her Junior year, her swim specialties included freestyle, backstroke and individual medley.

== Rosemead swim club highlights ==
In September 1962, Jeanne was voted a place on the AAU All American Swimming Team for her performances in the 1500-meter swim. In 1962, as a Junior at Arcadia, she was chosen for the All America team for the second time. She placed a very close second in the National 3-Mile swim in Huntingdon, Indiana in 1961 and trained for the Pan America games in her Junior year.

Hallock did her most significant early training with Rosemead Swim Club and then the City of Commerce Swim Club. Both clubs had been coached by Don Gambril during Hallock's swimming years. In May, 1961, Jeanne placed second in the 200-free at the Southern Pacific Senior AAU Meet, where three women from Gambril's Rosemead Club swept first through third places. A frequent distance competitor while swimming for Rosemead, Jeanne swam a 19:48.5 for the 1500-meter swim on August 16, 1962, in Chicago at the Women's National AAU Meet, though with stiff competition led by a World Record, she had a fifth-place finish.

Demonstrating skill as more than a distance competitor, she made her mark as a sprinter when she won the Women's 100-yard freestyle at the National AAU Women's Meet in early April, 1961 with a 1:01.9. Her Olympic swim in 1964 would utilize her sprint skills and demonstrate that her demanding daily workouts under Don Gambril had improved her times.

Swimming for Rosemead and Gambril in May 1962, Jeanne demonstrated her versatility at the AAU age group meet in the 15-16 year old category, by breaking records in the 100 and 200-meter freestyle, and as well as the 200-meter medley.

== 1964 Summer Olympics ==
In the 1964 Olympic trials in New York's Astoria Park on the first day of heats, Jeanne qualified in the 100-yard freestyle with a time of 1:06, then the third fastest time in the world. Prior to the Olympics in Tokyo, the U.S. Team trained for a month in Los Angeles before flying to Japan on September 30.

In finals competition, Hallock represented the United States as a 17-year-old at the mid-October 1964 Summer Olympics in Tokyo, Japan and was a team Co-captain. The women's coach at the Olympics that year was Hall of Fame coach Peter Daland, who would coach at USC, though Jeanne did not participate in collegiate swimming while she attended.

=== 4x100-meter freestyle relay ===
Jeanne had the good fortune to swim in the preliminary heats of the women's 4×100-meter freestyle relay, which would take a gold medal in the final heat, but did not receive a medal as she did not swim in the final heat. Under the 1964 Olympic swimming rules, only those relay swimmers who competed in the event final were eligible to receive medals, though this rule has subsequently changed and allowed many preliminary swimmers for events that won medals to receive medals.

=== 100-meter freestyle ===
Individually, she also swam in the women's 100-meter freestyle, an event in which she had excelled in her swimming career. She logged a time of 1:02.9, but did not advance beyond the event semifinals. Though she had world-class times in the event, Jeanne was swimming with a sore throat, and abscesses on her arms which may have hindered her performance. She lost out to Australian Dawn Fraser in the semi-final heat by 1 second, and Fraser went on to win the event in the Olympic finals.

== 1965 National AAU outdoor competition wins ==
Continuing to swim after the Olympics for the Commerce Swim Club under Don Gambril, Jeanne won the 1965 AAU Outdoor 4x200 free relay.

== 1965 National AAU indoor competition wins ==
=== 1965 AAU indoor 100-yard freestyle win ===
When Jeanne won the 100-yard freestyle as an 18-year old at the April 1965 AAU Indoor championships, she was a Physical Education student attending Cal Poly in Pomona before she transferred to USC. The meet was held at the City of Commerce Aquatorium, Jeanne's home pool, and Jeanne won in an upset against her Commerce Swim Club teammate, Olympic gold medalist Sharon Stouder, who was affected by illness. In an unexpected result, Jeanne defeated two more of her 1964 Olympic competitors. Her 100-yard time of around 54.8 edged out three top competitors who simultaneously clocked 54.9.

=== 65 AAU 200-yard indoor Individual Medley win ===
In April 1965, Hallock won the 200-yard Individual Medley swimming for the City of Commerce with a time of 2:14.2 in the National AAU Indoor Championships at the Commerce City Pool. As mentioned earlier, as a post-Olympic swimmer, Hallock swam as part of a City of Commerce 400-yard Medley Relay that included teammates Mary Campbell, Sandy Nitta, and Sharon Stowder, and smashed the American record with a time of 4:06.8 at the 1965 AAU Indoor Championship. Swimming at her home pool with her own teammates after another year of practice produced results for Jeanne that were comparable to her Olympic times in Tokyo the prior year.

== '67 Marriage to William Craig ==
On May 13, 1967, Jeanne married William Norval Craig in Las Vegas, Nevada. At the time, Jeanne was attending the University of Southern California and was a member of Pi Beta Phi. She swam for fitness during her college years, but not as a competitor. Jeanne's husband William also attended USC, was a swimmer for USC, and won a gold medal in the 1964 Tokyo Olympics. In 1965, Jeanne was a member of the United States Swim Team that toured Wales, England, France, Monaco, Portugal, and Italy and Spain. The couple initially lived in Costa Mesa.
