= Jan Cameron (coach) =

Australian swimmer and coach

Personal information
- National team: Australia
- Born: Janice Gabrielle Murphy; 20 February 1947 Sydney, Australia
- Died: 30 April 2018 (aged 71) Queensland, Australia
- Height: 1.50 m (4 ft 11 in)
- Weight: 50 kg (110 lb)

Sport
- Sport: Swimming
- Strokes: Freestyle
Medal record
Women's swimming
Representing Australia
Olympic Games
Silver medal – second place	1964 Tokyo	4×100m freestyle
Swimming at the Commonwealth Games
Silver medal – second place	1966 Kingston	440 yd individual medley
Silver medal – second place	1966 Kingston	4×110 yd freestyle relay
Bronze medal – third place	1966 Kingston	110 yd freestyle

Janice Gabrielle Cameron (née Murphy, formerly Talbot), OAM (20 February 1947 – 30 April 2018) was an Australian competition swimmer and coach.

She won a silver medal at the 1964 Tokyo Olympics and three medals at the 1966 British Empire and Commonwealth Games in Jamaica. She coached with her first husband Don Talbot in Australia, Canada, and the United States, and then moved to New Zealand, where she worked as a coach and sporting administrator until 2011. From May 2013 until February 2017, she coached the Paralympic Swimming Program at the USC Spartans Swim Club based at the University of the Sunshine Coast in Queensland, and she was Australia's National Para Sport Mentor Coach from February 2017 until her death.

== Early life ==
Janice Murphy was born on 20 February 1947 in Sydney, the eldest of three children. Her two brothers were keen rugby players. She attended Rosebank College.

== Competitive swimming career ==
Murphy's career overlapped that of fellow Australian swimmer, Dawn Fraser. Murphy won a silver medal in the 4×100-metre freestyle relay at the 1964 Summer Olympics in Tokyo; she teamed with Fraser, Lyn Bell and Robyn Thorn to finish 3.1 seconds behind the United States. She subsequently switched from Forbes Carlile's swimming team to work with Don Talbot. At the 1966 Commonwealth Games in Kingston, Jamaica, she won two silver medals in the 440-yard individual medley and the freestyle relay, and a bronze medal in the 110-yard freestyle.

== Coaching career ==
After the Tokyo Olympics, she began a teaching scholarship at the Wollongong Teachers' College (now the University of Wollongong). While studying there she did coaching on the sidelines; her first coaching job was in 1968 at a small swimming club in Port Kembla. After graduation, she took the activity up full-time.

She was the Paralympic swimming coach for the Australian team at the 1972 Heidelberg Paralympics, notably working with Pauline English, whom she also coached at the 1976 Toronto Paralympics. She worked as an assistant coach for Talbot, her first husband, in Canada, the United States and Australia. While in Canada, she completed an Honours degree in Physical Education and received a Masters in Coaching Sciences from Lakehead University.

She moved to New Zealand with Kevin Cameron, her second husband, and in 1991 she began working as head coach for the North Shore Swimming Club, turning it from a club with little money and no resources to one that attracted New Zealand's elite swimmers.

In 2001, Cameron began working as a national coach at the newly built Millennium Institute of Sport and Health (now AUT Millennium) at the Auckland University of Technology, and in 2008 she was appointed the general manager performance and pathways at Swimming New Zealand. In September 2011 she resigned from this position, nearly three months after the release of the Ineson report initiated by Sport New Zealand, which described the high-performance culture of Swimming New Zealand as "negative" and "dysfunctional". In an interview shortly after her resignation, Cameron said that the report was "Poorly written, poorly done, rubbish", and described parts of the report as "speculation, opinion and unsubstantiated stuff put there as facts". From 2011 to 2014 she was managing director of Jan Cameron Performance Compass, a performance sports consulting company that she founded.

She was the Paralympic swimming coach at the University of the Sunshine Coast in Queensland from April 2014 to February 2017, having been appointed to that role in an interim capacity in May 2013. From February 2017 until her death, she was the Australian National Para Sport Mentor Coach. She also worked as a swimming commentator for Sky TV. She was selected as an Australian Team Coach at the 2014 Para Pan Pacific Swimming Championships and the 2015 IPC Swimming World Championships Team. In 2015, she became the third Australian woman to gain her Platinum Coaching Licence following on from her swimmers' winning ten medals at the 2015 IPC Swimming World Championships in Glasgow, Scotland. She coached the Australian Swim Team at the 2016 Rio de Janeiro Paralympics and was the Head Para Mentor Coach at the 2018 Gold Coast Commonwealth Games.

== Personal life ==
She married Don Talbot in 1973. The couple had a son, Scott Talbot, an Olympic swimmer and coach. Her marriage to Talbot ended in 1989, and she married Kevin Cameron, the director of sport production at Sky Television in New Zealand, in 1990. They had first met in 1961 when Kevin, then 14, was playing rugby for a New Zealand school team that was touring Australia. He was billeted with the Murphy family as her brother was playing in the opposition team. The two corresponded for six years after their first meeting, and were briefly engaged after Murphy's retirement from the Olympics.

On 30 April 2018, Cameron died in Queensland after a short illness at the age of 71.

Cameron posthumously received the Medal of the Order of Australia in the 2019 Queen's Birthday Honours "for service to swimming, particularly as a coach."

== See also ==
- List of Olympic medalists in swimming (women)
