= Robyn Thorn =

Australian swimmer (1945–2026)

Personal information
- Full name: Robyn Jean Thorn
- National team: Australia
- Born: 26 November 1945 Queensland, Australia
- Died: 24 January 2026 (aged 80)

Sport
- Sport: Swimming
- Strokes: Freestyle
Medal record
Women's swimming
Representing Australia
Olympic Games
Silver medal – second place	1964 Tokyo	4×100 m freestyle relay
British Empire and Commonwealth Games
Gold medal – first place	1962 Perth	4×110 yd freestyle
Silver medal – second place	1962 Perth	110 yd freestyle
Bronze medal – third place	1970 Edinburgh	400 m freestyle
Bronze medal – third place	1970 Edinburgh	800 m freestyle

Robyn Jean Thorn (26 November 1945 – 24 January 2026), also known by her married name Robyn Nock, was an Australian freestyle swimmer who won the silver medal in the 4×100-metre freestyle relay at the 1964 Summer Olympics in Tokyo.

Coming from Kingaroy, Queensland, Thorn spent the majority of her career in the shadow of fellow Australian Dawn Fraser. Making her debut in the 1962 Commonwealth Games in Perth, Western Australia, Thorn was part of the winning 4×110-yard freestyle relay team, and won silver in the corresponding individual event behind Fraser. Two years later in Tokyo, Thorn was a semifinalist in the 100-metre freestyle, won by Fraser. She combined with Fraser, Lyn Bell and Janice Murphy to finish second, 3.1 seconds behind the United States.

Thorn died on 24 January 2026, at the age of 80.

== See also ==
- List of Olympic medalists in swimming (women)

== Sources ==
- Andrews, Malcolm (2000). Australia at the Olympic Games. Sydney, New South Wales: ABC Books. p. 434. ISBN 0-7333-0884-8.
- Evans, Hilary; Gjerde, Arild; Heijmans, Jeroen; Mallon, Bill; et al. "Robyn Thorn". Olympics at Sports-Reference.com. Sports Reference LLC. Archived from the original on 18 April 2020.
