= Toos Beumer =

Dutch swimmer (born 1947)

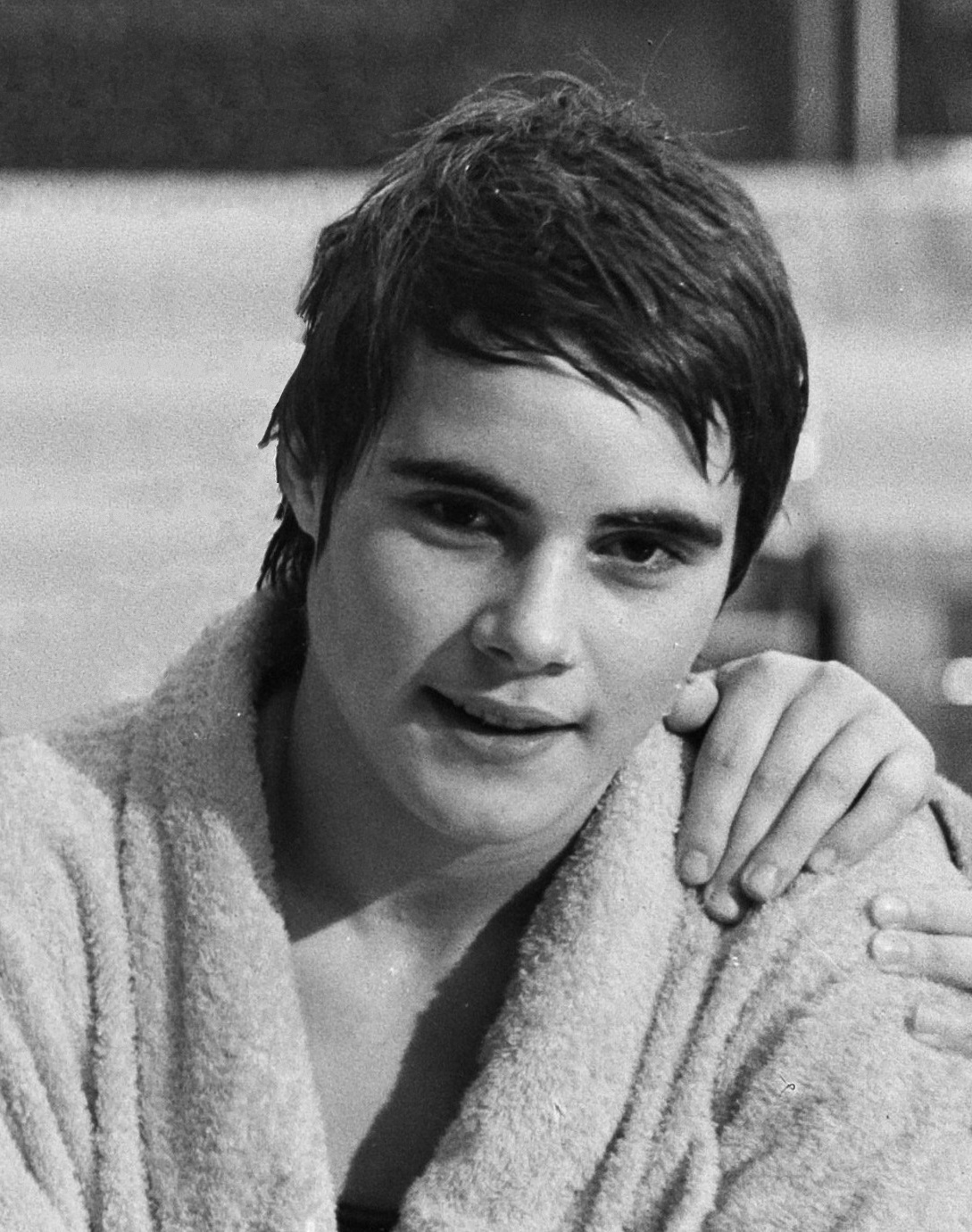
- Toos Beumer in 1963

Personal information
- Full name: Catharina Johanna Beumer
- Born: 5 July 1947 (age 78) Koog aan de Zaan, Netherlands
Medal record
Women's swimming
Representing the Netherlands
Olympic Games
Bronze medal – third place	1964 Tokyo	4×100 m freestyle
European Championships
Gold medal – first place	1966 Utrecht	4×100 m medley
Bronze medal – third place	1966 Utrecht	4×100 m freestyle

Catharina Johanna "Toos" Beumer (born 5 July 1947 in Koog aan de Zaan) is a Dutch swimmer. She won the bronze medal in the 4×100 metres freestyle relay at the 1964 Summer Olympics in Tokyo. Her teammates in that race, clocked in 4:12.0, were Pauline van der Wildt, Erica Terpstra and Winnie van Weerdenburg. Four years later, Beumer also participated in the 1968 Summer Olympics in Mexico City, in the 100 m freestyle, but she didn't qualify for the semi-finals.
