= Katalin Takács =

Hungarian swimmer

Personal information
- Born: 25 June 1942 (age 84) Budapest, Hungary
- Height: 1.72 m (5 ft 8 in)
- Weight: 63 kg (139 lb)

Sport
- Sport: Swimming
- Club: Újpesti TE, Budapest
Medal record
Representing Hungary
European Championships
Bronze medal – third place	1962 Leipzig	4×100 m freestyle

Katalin Takács (born 25 June 1942) is a retired Hungarian swimmer who won a bronze medal in the 4 × 100 m freestyle relay at the 1962 European Aquatics Championships. She finished fourth in the same event at the 1964 Summer Olympics.
