= Lillian Watson =

American swimmer

Personal information
- Full name: Lillian Debra Watson
- Nickname: "Pokey"
- National team: United States
- Born: July 11, 1950 (age 75) Mineola, New York, U.S.
- Height: 5 ft 9 in (1.75 m)
- Weight: 146 lb (66 kg)

Sport
- Sport: Swimming
- Strokes: Backstroke, freestyle
- Club: Santa Clara Swim Club
Medal record
Women's swimming
Representing the United States
Olympic Games
Gold medal – first place	1964 Tokyo	4x100 m freestyle
Gold medal – first place	1968 Mexico City	200 m backstroke
Pan American Games
Bronze medal – third place	1967 Winnipeg	100 m freestyle

Lillian Debra Watson (born July 11, 1950), commonly known by her nickname Pokey Watson, and later by her married name Lillian Richardson, is an American former competition swimmer, a two-time Olympic champion, and a former world record-holder in three events.

As a 14-year-old, she represented the United States at the 1964 Summer Olympics in Tokyo, Japan. Watson won a gold medal as a member of the first-place U.S. team in the women's 4×100-meter freestyle relay, together with her teammates Sharon Stouder, Donna de Varona and Kathy Ellis. The four American women set a new world of 4:03.8 in the event final. She also swam the backstroke leg for the gold medal-winning U.S. team in the preliminary heats of the women's 4×100-meter medley relay, but did not receive a second medal because only relay swimmers who competed in the event final were eligible under the 1964 rules. Four years later at the 1968 Summer Olympics in Mexico City, she won a gold medal for her first-place performance in the women's 200-meter backstroke, setting a new Olympic record of 2:24.8.

Watson broke Dawn Fraser's six-year-old world record in the 200-meter freestyle (long course) on August 19, 1966, with a time of 2:10.5, and held the record for one year. She was part of several world record performances in relay events.

Watson was inducted into the International Swimming Hall of Fame as an "Honor Swimmer" in 1984.

== See also ==
- List of Olympic medalists in swimming (women)
- List of University of California, Los Angeles people
- World record progression 200 metres freestyle
- World record progression 4 × 100 metres freestyle relay
- World record progression 4 × 100 metres medley relay

Records
Preceded by Dawn Fraser	Women's 200-meter freestyle world record-holder (long course); August 19, 1966 – August 19, 1967	Succeeded by Pam Kruse
