= Ann-Christine Hagberg =

Swedish swimmer (born 1948)

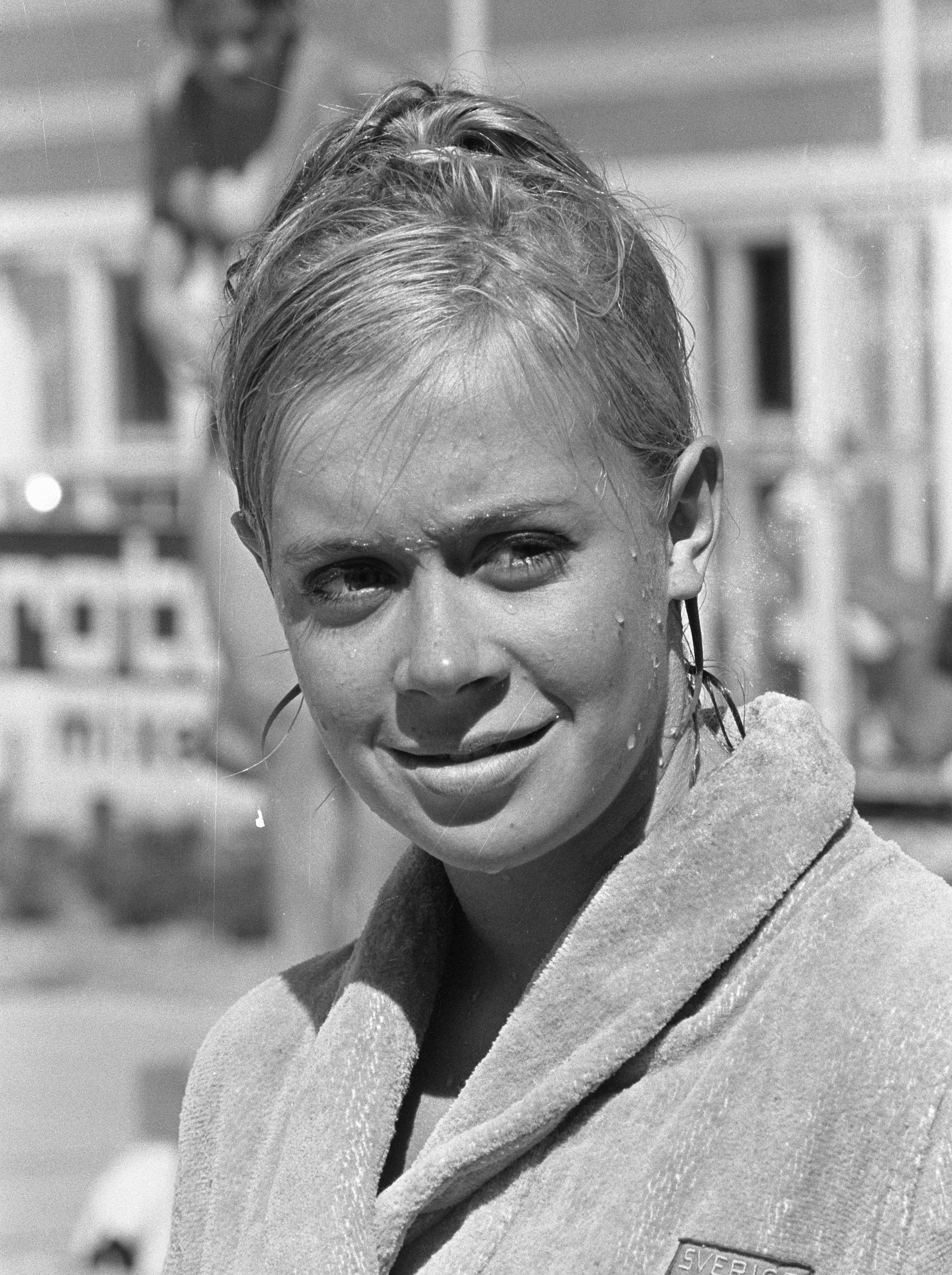
- Hagberg at the 1966 European Championships

Personal information
- Born: 20 January 1948 Karlstad, Sweden
- Height: 1.62 m (5 ft 4 in)
- Weight: 47 kg (104 lb)

Sport
- Sport: Swimming
- Club: SK Neptun, Stockholm
Medal record
Representing Sweden
European Championships
Silver medal – second place	1966 Utrecht	4×100 m freestyle

Ann-Christine "Anki" Hagberg (born 20 January 1948) is a retired Swedish swimmer who won a silver medal in the 4 × 100 m freestyle relay at the 1966 European Aquatics Championships. Two years earlier, at the 1964 Summer Olympics she finished fifth in the same event and seventh in the 100 m freestyle.

Hagberg was born in Karlstad, but her family soon moved to Uppsala where at age 8 she started swimming in a club. In 1963, aged 15, she broke three European records in the 100 m freestyle, all within one month. In total, during her career she set four European and 35 national records. After retiring from swimming, she received bachelor's degrees in sociology, psychology and law from the Lund University. She then worked in Stockholm, with the Swedish Science Association, PTK, and Swedish Swimming Federation (1979–1981). In 1986, she moved to an advertising agency, where she later became president.
