= Miyoko Azuma =

Japanese swimmer (born 1945)

Personal information
- Born: 10 March 1945 (age 81)

Sport
- Sport: Swimming
- Strokes: freestyle

Miyoko Azuma (東 美代子, Azuma Miyoko; born 10 March 1945) is a Japanese former freestyle swimmer. She competed in two events at the 1964 Summer Olympics.
