= Ulla Jäfvert =

Swedish swimmer (born 1946)

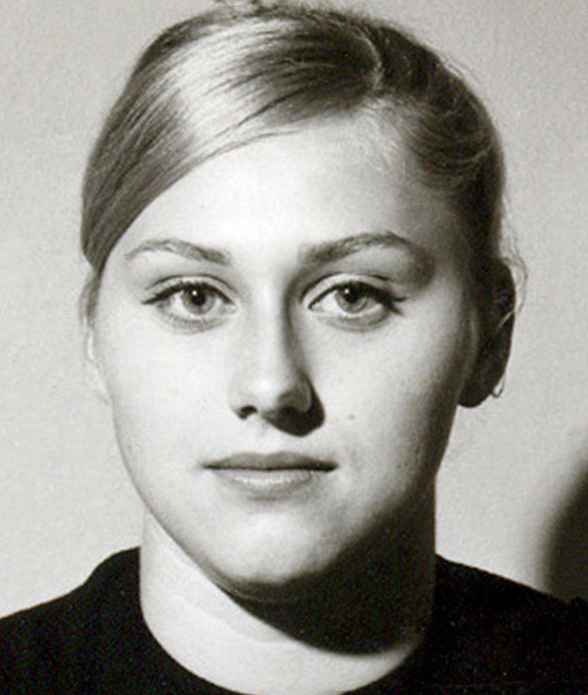

Personal information
- Born: 16 April 1946 (age 80) Stockholm, Sweden
- Height: 1.70 m (5 ft 7 in)
- Weight: 60 kg (130 lb)

Sport
- Sport: Swimming
- Club: Västerås SS
Medal record
Representing Sweden
European Championships
Silver medal – second place	1966 Utrecht	4×100 m freestyle

Ulla Birgitta Elisabeth Jäfvert (later Fahlén; born 16 April 1946) is a Swedish swimmer who won a silver medal in the 4 × 100 m freestyle relay at the 1966 European Aquatics Championships. Two years earlier at the 1964 Summer Olympics she finished fifth in the same event.

Jäfvert represented Västerås SS.
