= Winnie van Weerdenburg =

Dutch swimmer

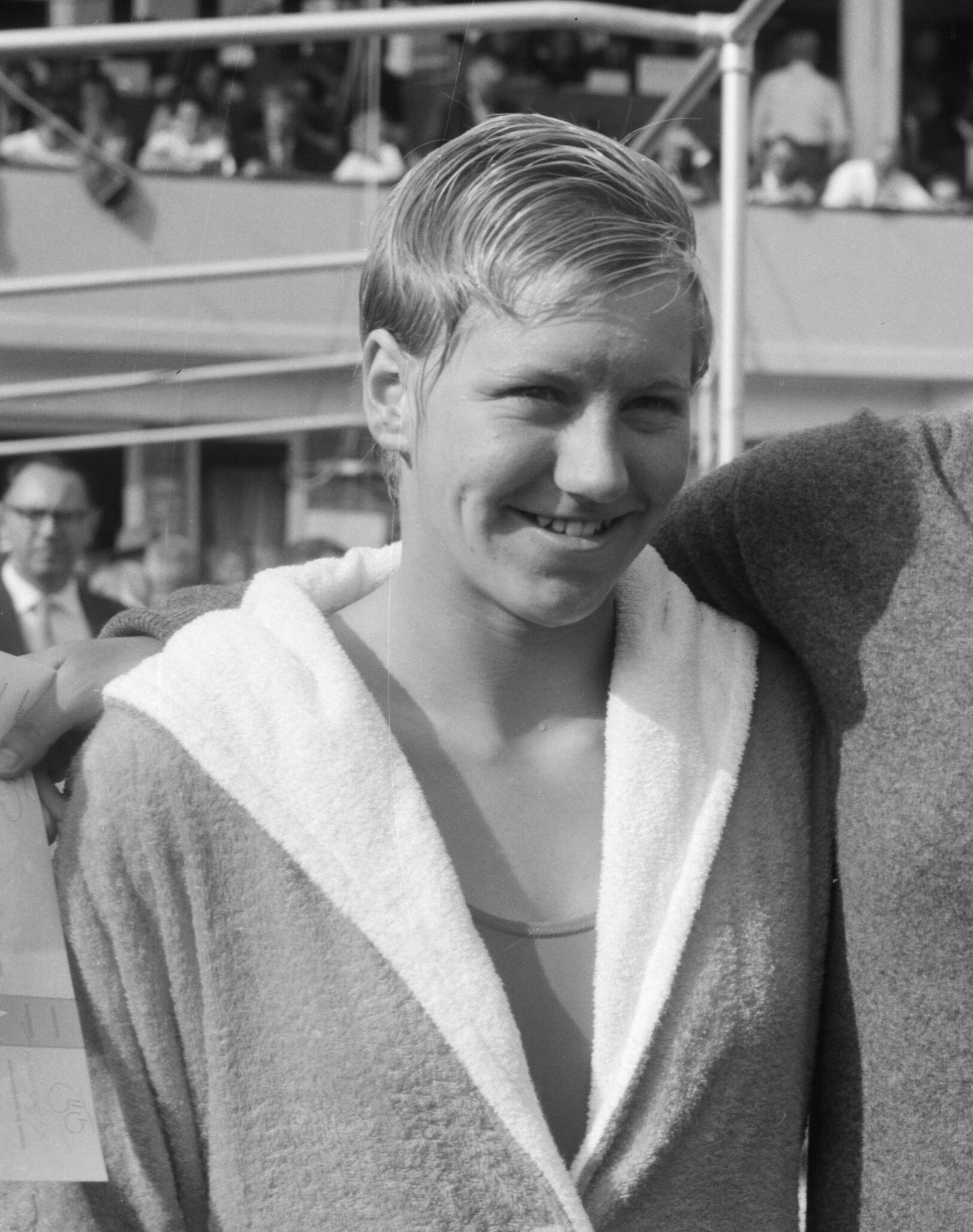
- Winnie van Weerdenburg in 1964

Personal information
- Born: 1 October 1946 The Hague, the Netherlands
- Died: 27 October 1998 (aged 52) The Hague, the Netherlands
- Height: 1.68 m (5 ft 6 in)
- Weight: 61 kg (134 lb)

Sport
- Sport: Swimming
- Club: HZ ZIAN, Den Haag
Medal record
Representing the Netherlands
Olympic Games
Bronze medal – third place	1964 Tokyo	4×100 m freestyle relay

Wilhelmina ("Winnie") van Weerdenburg (1 October 1946 – 27 October 1998) was a Dutch swimmer who won a bronze medal in the 4×100 metres freestyle relay at the 1964 Summer Olympics in Tokyo. Her teammates in that race, clocked in 4:12.0, were Toos Beumer, Erica Terpstra and Pauline van der Wildt. At her only individual start in Japan, on the 100 m freestyle, she was eliminated in the heats.
