= Lyn Bell =

Australian swimmer (born 1947)

Personal information
- Full name: Lynette Bell
- Nickname: "Lyn"
- National team: Australia
- Born: 24 January 1947 (age 79) New South Wales
- Height: 1.67 m (5 ft 6 in)
- Weight: 57 kg (126 lb)

Sport
- Sport: Swimming
- Strokes: Freestyle
Medal record
Women's swimming
Representing Australia
Olympic Games
Silver medal – second place	1964 Tokyo	4×100 m freestyle
British Empire and Commonwealth Games
Gold medal – first place	1962 Perth	4×110 yd freestyle
Silver medal – second place	1966 Kingston	110 yd freestyle
Silver medal – second place	1966 Kingston	4×110 yd freestyle
Bronze medal – third place	1966 Kingston	4×110 yd medley

Lynette "Lyn" Bell (born 24 January 1947), also known by her married name Lynette Chipchase, was an Australian freestyle swimmer of the 1960s, who won the silver medal in the 4×100-metre freestyle relay at the 1964 Summer Olympics in Tokyo.

Coming from New South Wales, Bell spent the majority of her career in the shadow of fellow Australian Dawn Fraser. Making her debut in the 1962 Commonwealth Games in Perth, Bell was part of the winning 4×110-yard freestyle relay team, and placed 4th in the corresponding individual event. Two years later in Tokyo, Bell was a finalist in the 100-metre freestyle, won by Fraser. She combined with Fraser, Robyn Thorn and Janice Murphy to finish second, 3.1 seconds behind the United States team. At the 1966 Commonwealth Games in Kingston, Jamaica, she collected a silver in the 100-yard freestyle, as well as silver and bronze in the freestyle and medley relays respectively. Bell competed in the 1968 Summer Olympics in Mexico City, reaching the semifinal and final of the 100-metre and 200-metre freestyle events respectively. She finished fourth as part of the freestyle relay.

== See also ==
- List of Olympic medalists in swimming (women)
