= Ann-Charlotte Lilja =

Swedish swimmer (born 1946)

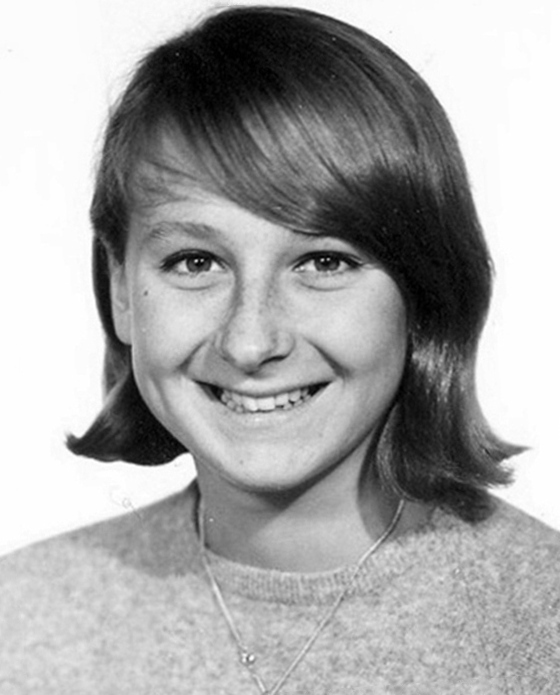

Personal information
- Born: 10 June 1946 Gothenburg, Sweden
- Height: 1.71 m (5 ft 7 in)
- Weight: 54 kg (119 lb)

Sport
- Sport: Swimming
- Club: SK Najaden, Göteborg
Medal record
Representing Sweden
European Championships
Silver medal – second place	1966 Utrecht	4×100 m freestyle

Ann-Charlotte Gun Lilja (also Ann-Charlott; born 10 June 1946) is a Swedish swimmer who won a silver medal in the 4 × 100 m freestyle relay at the 1966 European Aquatics Championships. Two years earlier at the 1964 Summer Olympics she finished fifth in the same event and eighth in the 400 m freestyle.

As of 2010, she was still competing in swimming in the masters category.
