= Csilla Madarász =

Hungarian swimmer (1943–2021)

Personal information
- Born: 23 June 1943 Budapest, Hungary
- Died: 31 December 2021 (aged 78)
- Height: 1.69 m (5 ft 7 in)
- Weight: 65 kg (143 lb)

Sport
- Sport: Swimming
- Club: Ferencvárosi TC
Medal record
Representing Hungary
European Championships
Bronze medal – third place	1962 Leipzig	4×100 m freestyle
Summer Universiade
Gold medal – first place	1963 Porto Alegro	100m freestyle
Gold medal – first place	1965 Budapest	100m freestyle

Csilla Madarász-Bajnogel-Dobai (23 June 1943 – 31 December 2021) was a Hungarian swimmer who won a bronze medal in the 4 × 100 m freestyle relay at the 1962 European Aquatics Championships. She competed in the 100 m freestyle, 4 × 100 m freestyle and 4 × 100 m medley events at the 1960 and 1964 Summer Olympics and finished fourth-sixth in all events, except for one relay where her team was disqualified for improper changeover. She was born Csilla Madarász, but changed her last name twice due to marriages. Madarász died on 31 December 2021, at the age of 78.
