= Erica Terpstra =

Dutch politician and swimmer

Her Excellency Erica Terpstra
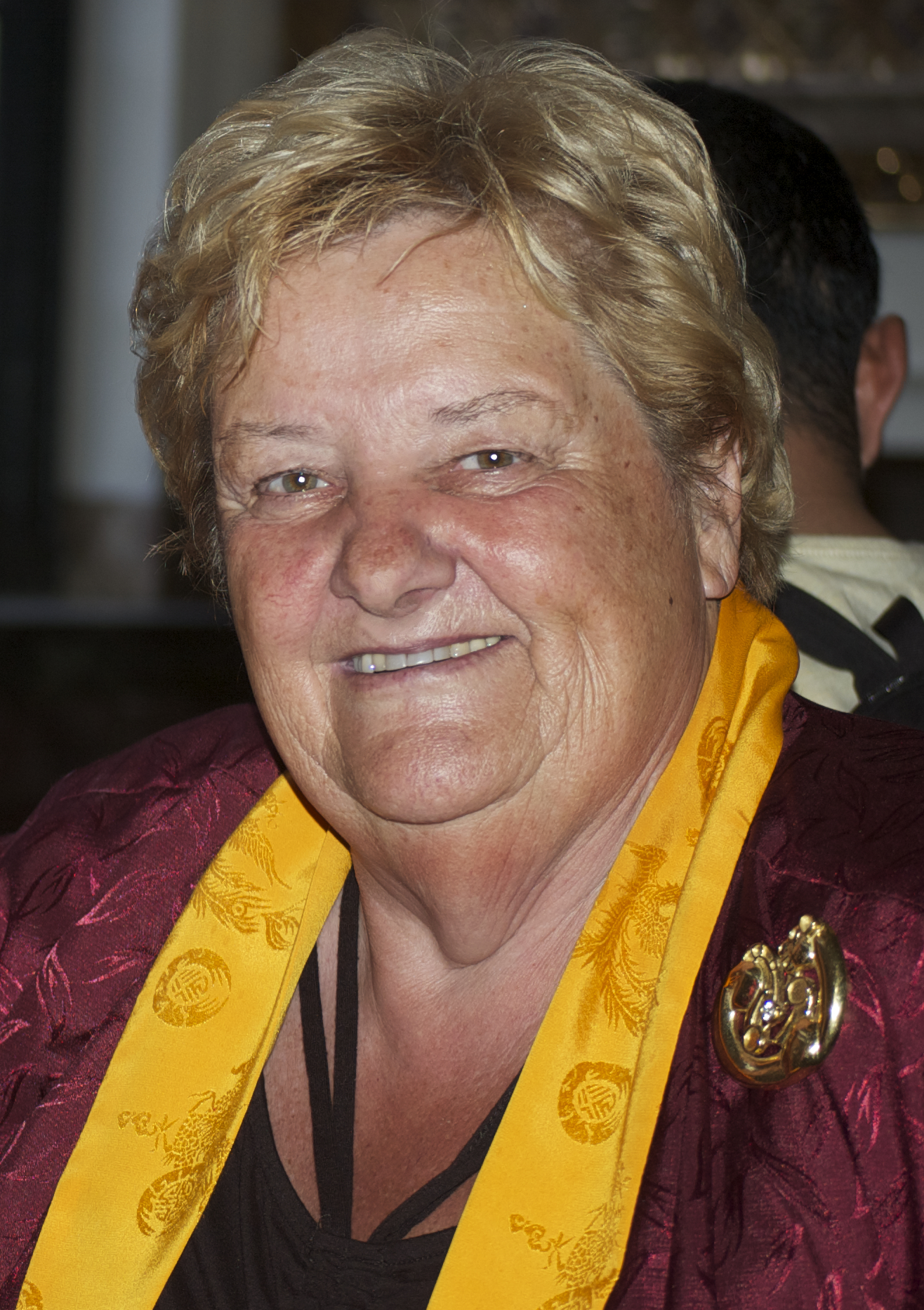
- Erica Terpstra in 2012

President of the Dutch Olympic Committee*Dutch Sports Federation
- In office 18 November 2003 – 18 May 2010
- Preceded by: Hans Blankert
- Succeeded by: André Bolhuis

State Secretary for Health, Welfare and Sport
- In office 22 August 1994 – 3 August 1998
- Prime Minister: Wim Kok
- Preceded by: Hans Simons as State Secretary for Welfare, Health and Culture
- Succeeded by: Margo Vliegenthart

Member of the House of Representatives
- In office 19 May 1998 – 15 December 2003
- In office 8 June 1977 – 22 August 1994
- Parliamentary group: People's Party for Freedom and Democracy

Personal details
- Born: Erica Georgina Terpstra; 26 May 1943 (age 83) The Hague, The Netherlands
- Party: People's Party for Freedom and Democracy
- Children: 2 sons
- Education: Leiden University (Bachelor of Arts)
- Occupation: Politician · Journalist · Sport administrator · Television presenter · Television producer · Teacher · Lobbyist · Author · Swimmer

Erica Georgina Terpstra (born 26 May 1943) is a retired Dutch politician of the People's Party for Freedom and Democracy (VVD).

Terpstra, a swimmer by occupation, participated in the 1960 and 1964 Summer Olympics. She was elected as a Member of the House of Representatives after the Dutch general election of 1977 serving from 8 June 1977 until 22 August 1994 when she became Undersecretary for Health, Welfare and Sport in the Cabinet Kok I serving from 22 August 1994 until 3 August 1998. After the Dutch general election of 1998 Terpstra returned to the House of Representatives serving from 19 May 1998 until 15 December 2003 when she was selected as President of the Dutch Olympic Committee*Dutch Sports Federation (NOC*NSF).

== Biography ==
=== Swimming ===
During the early 1960s Terpstra was a well-known freestyle swimmer in the Netherlands, specializing in the 100 meters. She participated in the 1960 Summer Olympics in Rome where she came sixth in the 100m Freestyle, and fourth in the 4×100 Medley Relay. Following the Olympics she joined the HZ&PC swim team in The Hague. While a member of this team she was again chosen to be an Olympic athlete for the Netherlands and won two medals at the 1964 Summer Olympics in Tokyo: the bronze medal in the 4×100 metres Freestyle Relay and the silver in the 4×100 metres Medley Relay (together with Pauline van der Wildt (starting), Toos Beumer (second relay) en Winnie van Weerdenburg (third relay)). At her only individual start, on the 100m Freestyle, she finished in fourth position in the final.

In addition to her Olympic exploits, Terpstra won the 1962 European championships and was champion of the Netherlands several times.

=== Interim years ===
After her swimming career Terpstra became a teacher, teaching Dutch to Chinese immigrants. She later became a sports journalist.

=== Politics ===
In 1977 Terpstra was elected to the parliament for the People's Party for Freedom and Democracy (VVD), just barely making it into parliament on a seat appointed to the VVD in the fractional division. She remained in parliament through 2003 though, with a four-year break (1994–1998) during which she served as state secretary for Health, Welfare and Sport in the Kok-I cabinet.

Upon leaving parliament in 2003, she was the senior member of the House, having been re-elected with a large number of preference votes each term (311.000 in 1994).

=== Sports official ===
On 21 October 2003 Terpstra was elected chairperson of the NOC*NSF, beating out Ruud Vreeman (the NOC*NSF board-nominated candidate) in the election. As chair in 2005 she was the first to present the new Fanny Blankers-Koen Trophy, which was named for legendary Dutch athlete Fanny Blankers-Koen. Terpstra presented the award to Anton Geesink, Sjoukje Dijkstra, Nico Rienks and Ard Schenk in the new skating rink in Turin, a few months before the start of the 2006 Winter Olympics. She was supposed to award an FBK Trophy to Johan Cruijff as well, but he couldn't make it due to obligations at the pool drawing for the 2006 FIFA World Cup in Leipzig.

During her tenure with NOC*NSF she was known for being present at major sporting events in which Dutch athletes competed and for being enthusiastic at their successes. Terpstra retired from NOC*NSF in May 2010.

Erica Terpstra
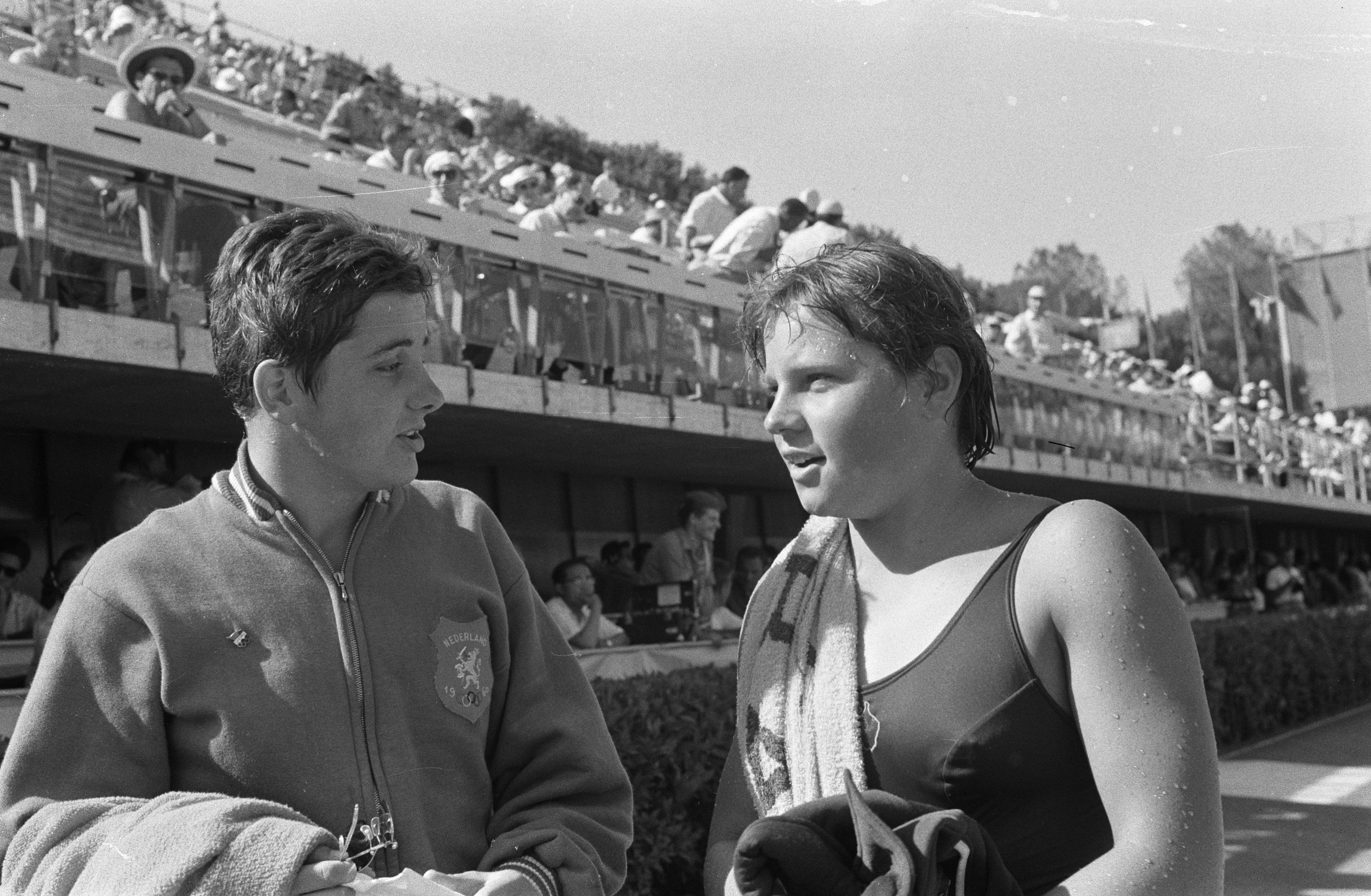
- Erica Terpstra (left) at the Rome Olympics

Medal record

Women's swimming

Representing the Netherlands

Olympic Games
Silver medal – second place	1964 Tokyo	4×100 m medley relay
Bronze medal – third place	1964 Tokyo	4×100 m freestyle relay

European Championships (LC)
Gold medal – first place	1962 Leipzig	4×100 m freestyle

== Film and television ==
Terpstra made her movie debut in 2004 in the movie version of the children's book Pluk van de Petteflet by Annie M.G. Schmidt. She played the role of mayor. Since early 2011 Terpstra hosts her own Travel-TV programme Erica op Reis for Dutch broadcaster Omroep MAX.

== Personal life ==
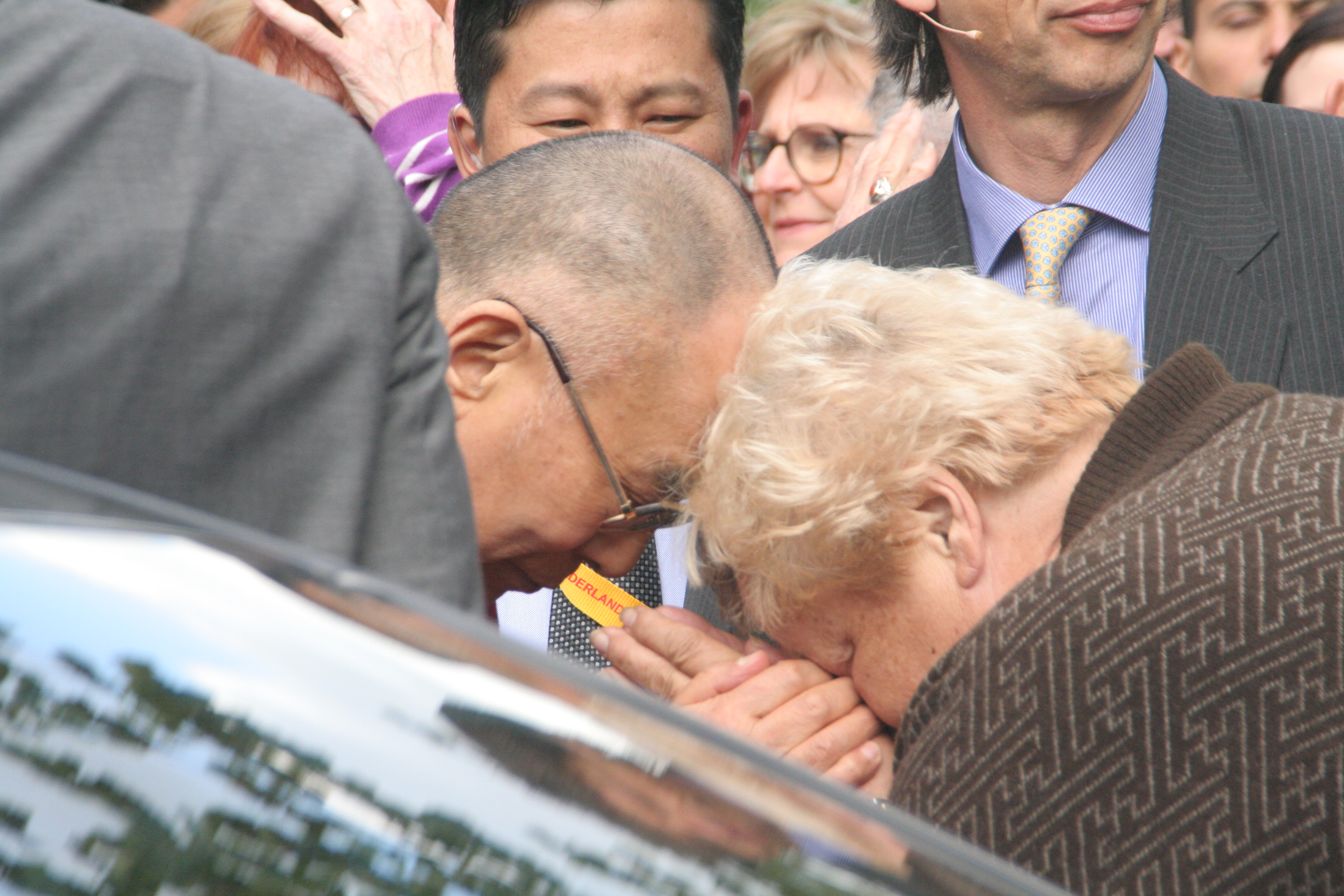
Erica Terpstra and the 14th Dalai Lama in 2014

- Terpstra has a Theosophist background. She is very drawn to Buddhism. Rather than considering herself a Buddhist though, she refers to herself as a "life-long student of Buddhism".
- Terpstra was married and has two sons.
- On 8 June 2008 Terpstra received the Major Bosshardt Prize for exceptional contributions to Dutch society.
- On 10 December 2008 Terpstra presented a book entitled Help, I'm losing weight! (Dutch: Help ik val af!; ISBN 978-90-902378-9-3). This describes how she lost 40 kilos in six months.

== Decorations ==
Honours
Ribbon bar	Honour	Country	Date	Comment
	Knight of the Order of the Netherlands Lion	Netherlands	30 October 1998	
	Officer of the Order of Orange-Nassau	Netherlands	18 May 2010	

Political offices
Preceded by Hans Simons as State Secretary for Welfare, Health and Culture	State Secretary for Health, Welfare and Sport; 1994–1998	Succeeded by Margo Vliegenthart
Sporting positions
Preceded by Hans Blankert	President of the Dutch Olympic; Committee*Dutch Sports Federation; 2003–2010	Succeeded by André Bolhuis
