= Sharon Stouder =

American swimmer (1948–2013)

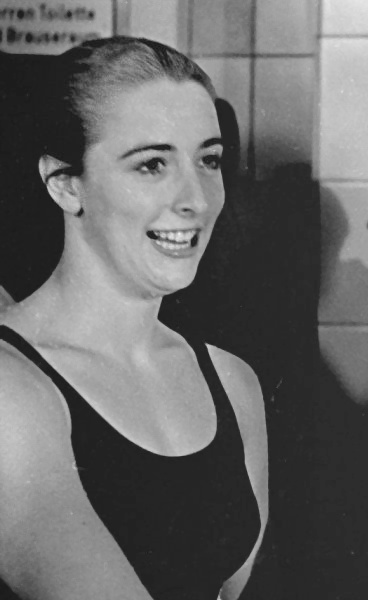
- Stouder in 1965

Personal information
- Full name: Sharon Marie Stouder
- National team: United States
- Born: November 9, 1948 Altadena, California, U.S.
- Died: June 23, 2013 (aged 64)
- Height: 5 ft 8 in (1.73 m)
- Weight: 134 lb (61 kg)

Sport
- Sport: Swimming
- Strokes: Freestyle, butterfly
- Club: Commerce Swim Club
- Coach: Don Gambril; Commerce Swim Club
Medal record
Women's swimming
Representing the United States
Olympic Games
Gold medal – first place	1964 Tokyo	100 m butterfly
Gold medal – first place	1964 Tokyo	4×100 m freestyle
Gold medal – first place	1964 Tokyo	4×100 m medley
Silver medal – second place	1964 Tokyo	100 m freestyle
Pan American Games
Gold medal – first place	1963 São Paulo	4×100 m freestyle
Gold medal – first place	1963 São Paulo	4×100 m medley

Sharon Marie Stouder (November 9, 1948 – June 23, 2013), also known by her married name Sharon Stouder Clark, was an American competition swimmer, three-time Olympic champion, and former world record-holder in four events.

== Early life ==
At only three, Sharon started swimming and began competition by eight, taking two firsts and setting age-group records in her first meet. She held 20 firsts in national age-group events, and took six National Junior Olympic age group ratings.

Stouder attended Glendora High School, and swam for Hall of Fame coach Don Gambril's highly competitive and nationally ranked City of Commerce Swim Club near Southeast Los Angeles. Earlier, Sharon swam with Gambril's Rosemead swim club which later merged with City of Commerce.

== Olympics ==
As a 15-year-old, outperforming initial expectations, she won three gold medals and one silver at the 1964 Summer Olympics in Tokyo, Japan. She won the women's 100-meter butterfly unexpectedly beating the favored Dutch champion Ada Kok, and was a member of the winning U.S. teams in the women's 4×100-meter freestyle relay and the women's 4×100-meter medley relay. In an outstanding performance, she took second place in the women's 100-meter freestyle, finishing only 0.4 seconds behind favored Australian Dawn Fraser, for a total of four medals. In taking the Olympic silver medal, she became the second woman to break the one minute barrier in the 100-meter freestyle with a 59.9. Fraser had dominated the 100-meter event and won it in two prior Olympics. At 70 meters Stouder led Fraser, who had recovered from a back injury, but Fraser finished strong, becoming the first Olympic swimmer to win the same event in three separate Olympics.

Stouder swam sprint butterfly and sprint freestyle. She was the second woman in history to go under the one-minute barrier in the 100-meter freestyle, the event she got her silver medal in at the 1964 Olympics. In 1964 she twice broke the world record in the women's 200-meter butterfly and set a record in the women's 100 meter butterfly as well.

In international competition, Stouder took a gold medal at the 1963 São Paulo Pan Am games in both the 4x100 freestyle and medley relays.

== Later life, and education ==
She attended Stanford University in Palo Alto, graduating in 1970 though Stanford had no women's swim team at the time, and her competitive swimming career virtually ended after the 1964 Tokyo Olympics.

After her swimming career, she returned to the San Francisco Bay area, where she married Ken Clark and lived in Los Altos, California. Stouder did graduate work at the University of California Santa Barbara, where she studied in the education program, earning teaching credentials, and worked coaching swimming and teaching. She lit the Olympic Torch at the 1984 games, raised a family and owned a women's clothing store from 1979 to 2004. She lived most of her adult life in the California Bay area.

She was active in a number of events supporting the Stanford athletics department, and both donated to and participated in the Stanford Cardinal Club which later became the Stanford Buck Club. She retired from her career in 2004, relocating to Pismo Beach on the Central coast of California.

Stouder died June 23, 2013, at 64 years old.

=== Honors ===
She was inducted into the International Swimming Hall of Fame in 1972, and the Stanford Hall of Fame in 1997. She was the California State Athlete of the year in 1963–64.

== See also ==
- List of members of the International Swimming Hall of Fame
- List of multiple Olympic gold medalists
- List of Olympic medalists in swimming (women)
- List of Stanford University people
- World record progression 100 metres butterfly
- World record progression 200 metres butterfly
- World record progression 4 × 100 metres freestyle relay
- World record progression 4 × 100 metres medley relay

Records
Preceded by Susan Pitt	Women's 200-meter butterfly world record-holder (long course); July 12, 1964 – August 15, 1965	Succeeded by Kendis Moore
Preceded by Ada Kok	Women's 100-meter butterfly world record-holder (long course); October 16, 1964 – August 14, 1965	Succeeded by Ada Kok
