= Great Britain at the 1968 Summer Olympics =

- Flag of the United Kingdom
- IOC code: GBR
- NOC: British Olympic Association

in Mexico City
- Competitors: 225 (175 men and 50 women) in 16 sports
- Flag bearers: Lynn Davies (opening); David Hemery (closing)
- Medals Ranked 10th: Gold 5 Silver 5 Bronze 3 Total 13

Summer Olympics appearances (overview)
- 1896; 1900; 1904; 1908; 1912; 1920; 1924; 1928; 1932; 1936; 1948; 1952; 1956; 1960; 1964; 1968; 1972; 1976; 1980; 1984; 1988; 1992; 1996; 2000; 2004; 2008; 2012; 2016; 2020; 2024

Other related appearances
- 1906 Intercalated Games

Great Britain, represented by the British Olympic Association (BOA), competed at the 1968 Summer Olympics in Mexico City, Mexico. 225 competitors, 175 men and 50 women, took part in 133 events in 16 sports. British athletes have competed in every Summer Olympic Games.

== Medallists ==
Medals by sport
Sport	Gold medal	Silver medal	Bronze medal	Total
Athletics	1	2	1	4
Equestrian	1	2	1	4
Sailing	1	0	1	2
Boxing	1	0	0	1
Shooting	1	0	0	1
Swimming	0	1	0	1
Total	5	5	3	13

=== Gold ===
- David Hemery — Athletics, Men's 400m Hurdles
- Chris Finnegan — Boxing, Men's Middleweight
- Derek Allhusen, Jane Bullen, Ben Jones, and Richard Meade — Equestrian, Three-Day Event Team Competition
- Bob Braithwaite — Shooting, Men's Trap Shooting
- Rodney Pattisson & Iain MacDonald-Smith — Sailing, Men's Flying Dutchman

=== Silver ===
- Lillian Board — Athletics, Women's 400 metres
- Sheila Sherwood — Athletics, Women's Long Jump
- Derek Allhusen — Equestrian, Three-Day Event Individual Competition
- Marion Coakes — Equestrian, Jumping Individual Competition
- Martyn Woodroffe — Swimming, Men's 200m Butterfly

=== Bronze ===
- John Sherwood — Athletics, Men's 400m Hurdles
- David Broome — Equestrian, Jumping Individual Competition
- Robin Aisher, Paul Anderson, and Adrian Jardine — Sailing, Men's 5½ Meter Class

== Athletics ==
Men's Hammer Throw

- Howard Payne

- Qualifying Round — 68.06m
- Final — 67.62m (→ 10th place)

Women's Pentathlon

- Sue Scott

- Final Result — 4.786 points (→ 10th place)

== Boxing ==
Men's Heavyweight (+ 81 kg)

- Billy Wells

- First Round — Lost to Ionas Chepulis (URS), TKO-3

== Cycling ==
Fourteen cyclists represented Great Britain in 1968.

Individual road race

- Dave Rollinson
- Brian Jolly
- Billy Bilsland
- Les West

Team time trial

- John Bettison
- Roy Cromack
- Pete Smith
- John Watson

Sprint

- Reg Barnett
- Ian Alsop

1000m time trial

- Brendan McKeown

Individual pursuit

- Ian Hallam

Team pursuit

- Ian Alsop
- Harry Jackson
- Ian Hallam
- Ronald Keeble

== Diving ==
Men

Athlete	Event	Preliminaries		Final			
Athlete	Event	Points	Rank	Points	Rank	Total	Rank
Robin Baskerville	10 m platform	81.23	27	Did not advance			
Frank Carter	3 m springboard	85.90	19	Did not advance			
David Priestley	10 m platform	80.30	28	Did not advance			

Women

Athlete	Event	Preliminaries		Final			
Athlete	Event	Points	Rank	Points	Rank	Total	Rank
Mandi Haswell	10 m platform	45.72	9 Q	36.61	12	82.33	12
Kathleen Rowlatt	3 m springboard	83.12	12 Q	39.04	9	122.16	12

== Fencing ==
17 fencers, 12 men and 5 women, represented Great Britain in 1968.

Men's foil

- Graham Paul
- Bill Hoskyns
- Mike Breckin

Men's team foil

- Allan Jay, Graham Paul, Nick Halsted, Mike Breckin, Bill Hoskyns

Men's épée

- Ralph Johnson
- Nick Halsted
- Bill Hoskyns

Men's team épée

- Nick Halsted, Teddy Bourne, Bill Hoskyns, Ralph Johnson, Peter Jacobs

Men's sabre

- Rodney Craig
- Sandy Leckie
- Richard Oldcorn

Men's team sabre

- Sandy Leckie, Rodney Craig, David Acfield, Richard Oldcorn

Women's foil

- Janet Wardell-Yerburgh
- Sue Green
- Judith Bain

Women's team foil

- Judith Bain, Janet Wardell-Yerburgh, Sue Green, Julia Davis, Eva Davies

== Hockey ==
=== Pool B ===
Pos	Team	Pld	W	D	L	GF	GA	GD	Pts	Qualification
1	Pakistan	7	7	0	0	23	4	+19	14	Semi-finals
2	Australia	8	5	1	2	15	7	+8	11	Semi-finals
3	Kenya	8	4	1	3	13	9	+4	9	
4	Netherlands	7	4	0	3	11	11	0	8	
5	Great Britain	7	2	1	4	6	8	−2	5	
6	France	7	2	1	4	2	5	−3	5	
7	Argentina	7	1	1	5	4	20	−16	3	
8	Malaysia	7	0	3	4	2	12	−10	3	

13 October 1968

Great Britain	2–0	Argentina

14 October 1968

Australia	0–0	Great Britain

16 October 1968

Netherlands	2–1	Great Britain

17 October 1968

France	1–0	Great Britain

19 October 1968

Pakistan	2–1	Great Britain

20 October 1968

Kenya	3–0	Great Britain

21 October 1968

Great Britain	2–0	Malaysia

== Modern pentathlon ==
Three male pentathletes represented Great Britain in 1968.

Individual

- Jim Fox
- Barry Lillywhite
- Robert Phelps

Team

- Jim Fox
- Barry Lillywhite
- Robert Phelps

== Rowing ==
There were seven rowing events for men only and Great Britain entered two boats. In the eight, Malcolm Malpass in seat 5 was replaced with John Mullard in the B final.

Athlete	Event	Heats		Repechage		Semi-finals		Final	
Athlete	Event	Time	Rank	Time	Rank	Time	Rank	Time	Rank
Kenny Dwan	Single sculls	8:03.95	4 R	7:41.98	1 SF	7:55.90	3 FA	8:13.76	6
Peter Thomas; Andrew Bayles; Patrick Wright; Peter Knapp; John Mullard; Robin Yarrow; Bruce Carter; Michael Cooper; Timothy Kirk (cox); Malcolm Malpass	Eight	6:22.20	6 R	6:43.55	5 FB	—N/a		6:29.23	10

== Sailing ==
Open

Athlete	Event	Race							Net points	Final rank
Athlete	Event	1	2	3	4	5	6	7	Net points	Final rank
Michael Maynard	Finn	5	11	18	17	20	~~DNF~~	23	129	22
Rodney Pattisson; Iain MacDonald-Smith	Flying Dutchman	~~DSQ~~	1	1	1	1	1	2	3	Gold medal
Stuart Jardine; James Ramus	Star	12	11	8	2	9	14	~~16~~	87	10
Robin Judah; Charles Reynolds; David Tucker	Dragon	5	17	6	~~20~~	16	15	8	101.7	14
Robin Aisher; Paul Anderson; Adrian Jardine	5.5 Metre	6	2	4	3	~~8~~	3	3	39.8	Bronze medal

== Shooting ==
Ten shooters, all men, represented Great Britain in 1968. Bob Braithwaite won gold in the trap.

Open

Athlete	Event	Final	
Athlete	Event	Score	Rank
Alister Allan	50 m rifle, prone	595	9
Alec Bonnett	Skeet	191	14
Bob Braithwaite	Trap	198 OR	Gold medal
Tony Clark	25 m pistol	581	24
Eric Grantham	Trap	187	34
Robert Hassell	25 m pistol	580	26
Marcus Loader	50 m pistol	512	62
John Palin	50 m rifle, prone	596	5
Colin Sephton	Skeet	188	26
Charles Sexton	50 m pistol	543	29

== Swimming ==
Men

Athlete	Event	Heat		Semifinal		Final	
Athlete	Event	Time	Rank	Time	Rank	Time	Rank
Joseph Jackson	100 metre backstroke	1:03.0	12 Q	1:02.8	15	Did not advance	
Joseph Jackson	100 metre butterfly	59.7	12 Q	59.3	9	Did not advance	
Anthony Jarvis	100 metre freestyle	56.5	33	Did not advance			
Tony Jarvis	200 metre freestyle	2:09.3	41	Did not advance			
Roddy Jones	100 metre backstroke	1:04.1	19	Did not advance			
Bobby McGregor	100 metre freestyle	55.1	12 Q	53.8	3 Q	53.5	4
Roger Roberts	100 metre breaststroke	1:11.7	26	Did not advance			
Roger Roberts	200 metre breaststroke	2:42.2	27	Did not advance			
Stuart Roberts	100 metre breaststroke	1:12.7	30	Did not advance			
Stuart Roberts	200 metre breaststroke	2:39.1	19	Did not advance			
Raymond Terrell	200 metre medley	2:23.5	24	Did not advance			
Raymond Terrell	400 metre medley	5:19.5	27	Did not advance			
John Thurley	200 metre freestyle	DNS		Did not advance			
John Thurley	100 metre butterfly	1:00.7	24 Q	1:01.2	22	Did not advance	
John Thurley	200 metre butterfly	2:12.5	10	Did not advance			
Michael Turner	100 metre freestyle	55.8	22 Q	55.6	19	Did not advance	
Michael Turner	200 metre freestyle	DNS		Did not advance			
Martyn Woodroffe	100 metre butterfly	59.7	11 Q	59.5	10	Did not advance	
Martyn Woodroffe	200 metre butterfly	2:11.6	7 Q	—N/a		2:09.0	
Martyn Woodroffe	200 metre medley	2:22.0	19	Did not advance			
Martyn Woodroffe	400 metre medley	5:03.9	9	Did not advance			
Mike Turner; Bobby McGregor; David Hembrow; Tony Jarvis	4 x 100 metre freestyle	3:40.4	7 Q	—N/a		3:38.4	4
John Thurley; Raymond Terrell; Bobby McGregor; Tony Jarvis	4 x 200 metre freestyle	8:16.3	9	Did not advance			
Joseph Jackson; Roger Roberts; Martyn Woodroffe; Bobby McGregor	4 x 100 metre medley relay	4:07.7	9	Did not advance			

Women

Athlete	Event	Heat		Semifinal		Final	
Athlete	Event	Time	Rank	Time	Rank	Time	Rank
Margaret Auton	100 metre butterfly	1:08.5	11 Q	1:08.7	13	Did not advance	
Margaret Auton	200 metre butterfly	2:33.6	8 Q	—N/a		2:33.2	7
Jacqueline Brown	100 metre backstroke	1:13.0	27	Did not advance			
Jacqueline Brown	200 metre backstroke	2:40.0	21	Did not advance			
Wendy Burrell	100 metre backstroke	1:12.0	22	Did not advance			
Wendy Burrell	200 metre backstroke	2:33.2	4 Q	—N/a		2:32.3	5
Sheila Clayton	400 metre freestyle	5:08.0	19	Did not advance			
Sally Davison	200 metre freestyle	2:26.1	29	Did not advance			
Sally Davison	400 metre freestyle	5:11.2	25	Did not advance			
Diana Harris	100 metre breaststroke	1:19.8	13 Q	1:19.3	14	Did not advance	
Diana Harris	200 metre breaststroke	3:03.4	25	Did not advance			
Dorothy Harrison	100 metre breaststroke	1:19.6	12 Q	1:19.6	15	Did not advance	
Dorothy Harrison	200 metre breaststroke	2:55.1	15	Did not advance			
Alexandra Jackson	100 metre freestyle	1:00.5	2 Q	1:00.6	3 Q	1:01.0	6
Alexandra Jackson	200 metre freestyle	2:19.2	14	Did not advance			
Fiona Kellock	100 metre freestyle	1:05.8	39	Did not advance			
Shelagh Ratcliffe	200 metre medley	2:34.9	8 Q	—N/a		DSQ	
Shelagh Ratcliffe	400 metre medley	5:33.2	6 Q	—N/a		5:30.5	5
Jill Slattery	100 metre breaststroke	1:20.7	17 Q	1:19.8	16	Did not advance	
Jill Slattery	200 metre breaststroke	2:51.2	9	Did not advance			
Gillian Treers	100 metre freestyle	1:06.3	44	Did not advance			
Gillian Treers	100 metre butterfly	1:10.6	16 Q	1:10.6	16	Did not advance	
Susan Williams	200 metre freestyle	2:20.4	17	Did not advance			
Susan Williams	400 metre freestyle	5:02.7	21	Did not advance			
Susan Williams	800 metre freestyle	10:17.6	12	Did not advance			
Shelagh Ratcliffe; Fiona Kellock; Susan Williams; Alexandra Jackson	4 x 100 metre freestyle	4:16.3	8 Q	—N/a		4:18.0	8
Wendy Burrell; Dorothy Harrison; Margaret Auton; Alexandra Jackson	4 x 100 metre medley relay	4:40.4	7 Q	—N/a		4:38.3	6

== Weightlifting ==
Men

Athlete	Event	Military Press		Snatch		Clean & Jerk		Total	Rank
Athlete	Event	Result	Rank	Result	Rank	Result	Rank	Total	Rank
Precious McKenzie	56 kg	107.5	7	92.5	9	130.0	7	330.0	9
Gerald Perrin	60 kg	0	NVL	0	DNS	0	DNS	0	AC
Mike Pearman	82,5 kg	140.0	9	125.0	13	160.0	15	425.0	14
Peter Arthur	82,5 kg	137.5	11	120.0	17	157.5	19	415.0	18
Sylvanus Blackman	90 kg	132.5	20	125.0	17	162.5	18	420.0	20
Louis Martin	90 kg	160.0	4	145.0	4	0	NVL	305	AC
Terry Perdue	+90 kg	167.5	6	142.5	9	177.5	11	487.5	10
