= Aquatics at the 1966 British Empire and Commonwealth Games =

- Venue: National Aquatic Centre
- Dates: 4 – 13 August 1966

Aquatics at the 1966 British Empire and Commonwealth Games made its eighth appearance at the Commonwealth Games, with both Swimming at the Commonwealth Games and Diving at the Commonwealth Games being included again.

There were 24 swimming events and 4 diving events. The National Aquatic Centre in Independence Park, built in 1962, was modified for the Games.

Australia topped the medal table with 11 gold medals.

In the diving events, Australia missed out on a clean sweep of silver medals when Beverly Boys of Canada beat Australia's Susan Knight in the women's 3 metre springboard by a score of just 0.02. Australia also missed out on a gold medal by the same score of just 0.2 in the women's 10 metre platform, with England's Joy Newman finishing just ahead of Australia's Robyn Bradshaw.

== Medal table ==
* Host nation (Jamaica)

Medals won by country, ranked and sortable, with totals
| Rank | Nation | Gold | Silver | Bronze | Total |
|---|---|---|---|---|---|
| 1 | Australia | 11 | 10 | 9 | 30 |
| 2 | England | 9 | 4 | 9 | 22 |
| 3 | Canada | 7 | 11 | 7 | 25 |
| 4 | New Zealand | 1 | 2 | 3 | 6 |
| 5 | Scotland | 0 | 1 | 0 | 1 |
| Totals (5 entries) | | 28 | 28 | 28 | 84 |

== Medal winners ==
=== Diving ===
Men's events

| Event | Gold | Silver | Bronze |
|---|---|---|---|
| 3m Springboard | (England) Brian Phelps | (Australia) Don Wagstaff | (Australia) Chris Robb |
| 10m Highboard | (England) Brian Phelps | (Australia) Don Wagstaff | (Australia) Chris Robb |

Women's events

| Event | Gold | Silver | Bronze |
|---|---|---|---|
| 3m Springboard | (England) Kathy Rowlatt | (Canada) Beverly Boys | (Australia) Susan Knight |
| 10m Highboard | (England) Joy Newman | (Australia) Robyn Bradshaw | (Canada) Beverly Boys |

=== Swimming ===
Men's events

| Event | Gold | Silver | Bronze |
|---|---|---|---|
| 110 yd freestyle | (Australia) Mike Wenden | (Scotland) Bob McGregor | (Australia) David Dickson |
| 440 yd freestyle | (Australia) Bob Windle | (Australia) John Bennett | (Canada) Ralph Hutton |
| 1650 yd freestyle | (Australia) Ron Jackson | (Canada) Sandy Gilchrist | (Canada) Ralph Hutton |
| 110 yd backstroke | (Australia) Peter Reynolds | (Canada) Ralph Hutton | (England) Neil Jackson |
| 220 yd backstroke | (Australia) Peter Reynolds | (Canada) Ralph Hutton | (Australia) Karl Byrom |
| 110 yd breaststroke | (Australia) Ian O'Brien | (New Zealand) Tony Graham | (England) Malcolm Tucker |
| 220 yd breaststroke | (Australia) Ian O'Brien | (New Zealand) Tony Graham | (Canada) Bill Mahony |
| 110 yd butterfly | (Canada) Ron Jacks | (Australia) Graham Dunn | (England) Keith Bewley |
| 220 yd butterfly | (New Zealand) David Gerrard | (Australia) Brett Hill | (Canada) Tom Arusoo |
| 440 yd individual medley | (Australia) Peter Reynolds | (Canada) Ralph Hutton | (Canada) Sandy Gilchrist |
| 4×110 yd freestyle relay | Australia; David Dickson; John Ryan; Mike Wenden; Bob Windle | Canada; Sandy Gilchrist; Ralph Hutton; Robert Kasting; Ronald Jacks | England; Tony Jarvis; John Martin-Dye; Michael Turner; Bob Lord |
| 4×220 yd freestyle relay | Australia; David Dickson; Mike Wenden; Peter Reynolds; Bob Windle | Canada; Sandy Gilchrist; Ralph Hutton; Robert Kasting; Ronald Jacks | England; Tony Jarvis; John Thurley; Keith Bewley; Michael Turner |
| 4×110 yd medley relay | Canada; Sandy Gilchrist; Leonard Chase; Ralph Hutton; Ronald Jacks | England; Keith Bewley; Malcolm Tucker; Michael Turner; Neil Jackson | New Zealand; David Gerrard; Tony Graham; Hilton Brown; Paddy O'Carroll |

Women's events

| Event | Gold | Silver | Bronze |
|---|---|---|---|
| 110 yd freestyle | (Canada) Marion Lay | (Australia) Lynette Bell | (Australia) Jan Murphy |
| 440 yd freestyle | (Australia) Kathy Wainwright | (Australia) Jenny Thorn | (Australia) Kim Herford |
| 110 yd backstroke | (England) Linda Ludgrove | (Canada) Elaine Tanner | (England) Janet Franklin |
| 220 yd backstroke | (England) Linda Ludgrove | (Canada) Elaine Tanner | (New Zealand) Margaret Macrae |
| 110 yd breaststroke | (England) Diana Harris | (England) Jill Slattery | (Australia) Heather Saville |
| 220 yd breaststroke | (England) Jill Slattery | (England) Stella Mitchell | (New Zealand) Vivien Haddon |
| 110 yd butterfly | (Canada) Elaine Tanner | (England) Judy Gegan | (England) Ann Barner |
| 220 yd butterfly | (Canada) Elaine Tanner | (Canada) Marilyn Corson | (England) Ann Barner |
| 440 yd individual medley | (Canada) Elaine Tanner | (Australia) Jan Murphy | (Canada) Jane Hughes |
| 4×110 yd freestyle relay | Canada; Elaine Tanner; Jane Hughes; Louise Kennedy; Marion Lay | Australia; Janet Steinbeck; Janice Murphy; Lyn Bell; Marion Smith | England; Diana Wilkinson; Jeanette Cave; Pauline Sillett; Susan Cope |
| 4×110 yd medley relay | England; Diana Harris; Judy Gegan; Linda Ludgrove; Pauline Sillett | Canada; Donna Ross; Elaine Tanner; Louise Kennedy; Marion Lay | Australia; Allyson Mabb; Heather Saville; Jill Groeger; Lyn Bell |

== Finals ==
=== Diving (men) ===
Men's results for 3 metre springboard
| Rank | Name | Score |
|---|---|---|
| "1, gold medal" | Brian Phelps (ENG) | 154.55 |
| "2, siver medal" | Don Wagstaff (AUS) | 150.17 |
| "3, bronze medal" | Chris Robb (AUS) | 136.52 |
| 4 | Larry Follinsbee (CAN) | 132.07 |
| 5 | Robin Hood (NZL) | 130.46 |
| 6 | Dennis Young (ENG) | 129.97 |
| 7 | John Miles (ENG) | 124.73 |
| 8 | David Priestly (WAL) | 119.52 |

Men's results for 10 metre platform
| Rank | Name | Score |
|---|---|---|
| "1, gold medal" | Brian Phelps (ENG) | 164.51 |
| "2, silver medal" | Don Wagstaff (AUS) | 148.44 |
| "3, bronze medal" | Chris Robb (AUS) | 141.68 |
| 4 | John Miles (ENG) | 139.23 |
| 5 | David Priestly (WAL) | 135.38 |
| 6 | Brian Davidson (SCO) | 129.58 |
| 7 | Terry Fitzpatrick (CAN) | 128.42 |
| 8 | Larry Follinsbee (CAN) | 113.14 |

=== Diving (women) ===
Women's results for 3 metre springboard
| Rank | Name | Score |
|---|---|---|
| "1, gold medal" | Kathy Rowlatt (ENG) | 147.10 |
| "2, silver medal" | Beverly Boys (CAN) | 134.92 |
| "3, bronze medal" | Susan Knight (AUS) | 134.90 |
| 4 | Madeleine Haswell (WAL) | 130.74 |
| 5 | Robyn Bradshaw (AUS) | 130.18 |
| 6 | Cathy McDonald (CAN) | 121.67 |
| 7 | Betsy Sullivan (JAM) | 70.61 |

Women's results for 10 metre platform
| Rank | Name | Score |
|---|---|---|
| | Joy Newman (ENG) | 98.87 |
| | Robyn Bradshaw (AUS) | 98.85 |
| | Beverly Boys (CAN) | 97.21 |
| 4 | Susan Knight (AUS) | 96.68 |
| 5 | Frances Cramp (ENG) | 88.32 |
| 6 | Cathy McDonald (CAN) | 86.35 |
| 7 | Madeleine Haswell (WAL) | 82.62 |

== Swimmming (men) ==
=== 110y freestyle ===
| Pos | Athlete | Time |
|---|---|---|
| 1 | (Australia) Mike Wenden | 54.0 |
| 2 | (Scotland) Bob McGregor | 54.2 |
| 3 | (Australia) David Dickson | 54.6 |
| 4 | (Australia) John Ryan | 54.9 |
| 5 | (Canada) Sandy Gilchrist | 55.8 |
| 6 | (Canada) Robert Kasting | 56.9 |
| 7 | (England) Michael Turner | 56.9 |
| 8 | (Scotland) Gordon Black | 56.9 |

=== 440y freestyle ===
| Pos | Athlete | Time |
|---|---|---|
| 1 | (Australia) Bob Windle | 4:15.0 |
| 2 | (Australia) John Dennis Bennett | 4:15.9 |
| 3 | (Canada) Ralph Hutton | 4:16.1 |
| 4 | (Canada) Ron Jacks | 4:19.7 |
| 5 | (Canada) Sandy Gilchrist | 4:20.1 |
| 6 | (Australia) Ron Jackson | 4:24.9 |
| 7 | (England) Tony Jarvis | 4:28.7 |
| 8 | (England) Alan Kimber | 4:33.4 |

=== 1650y freestyle ===
| Pos | Athlete | Time |
|---|---|---|
| 1 | (Australia) Ron Jackson | 17:25.9 |
| 2 | (Canada) Sandy Gilchrist | 17:33.9 |
| 3 | (Canada) Ralph Hutton | 17:38.9 |
| 4 | (Australia) Bob Windle | 17:49.2 |
| 5 | (England) Alan Kimber | 18:02.9 |
| 6 | (Canada) Gordon Eby | 18:03.2 |
| 7 | (Australia) John Dennis Bennett | 18:22.5 |
| 8 | (England) Tony Jarvis | 18:46.9 |

=== 110y backstroke ===
| Pos | Athlete | Time |
|---|---|---|
| 1 | (Australia) Peter Reynolds | 1:02.4 |
| 2 | (Canada) Ralph Hutton | 1:02.7 |
| 3 | (England) Neil Jackson | 1:03.3 |
| 4 | (New Zealand) Paddy O'Carroll | 1:04.4 |
| 5 | (England) Tony Davidson | 1:04.7 |
| 6 | (Canada) Alex Fedko | 1:05.2 |
| 7 | (Canada) Jim Shaw | 1:05.2 |
| 8 | (Australia) Karl Byrom | 1:05.8 |

=== 220y backstroke ===
| Pos | Athlete | Time |
|---|---|---|
| 1 | (Australia) Peter Reynolds | 2:12.0 |
| 2 | (Canada) Ralph Hutton | 2:13.5 |
| 3 | (Australia) Karl Byrom | 2:18.8 |
| 4 | (England) Neil Jackson | 2:19.2 |
| 5 | (New Zealand) Hilton Brown | 2:19.8 |
| 6 | (New Zealand) Paddy O'Carroll | 2:20.9 |
| 7 | (England) Jimmy Rogers | 2:21.3 |
| 8 | (New Zealand) Allan H. Seager | 2:25.1 |

=== 110y breaststroke ===
| Pos | Athlete | Time |
|---|---|---|
| 1 | (Australia) Ian O'Brien | 1:08.2 |
| 2 | (New Zealand) Tony Graham | 1:12.9 |
| 3 | (England) Malcolm Tucker | 1:13.9 |
| 4 | (New Zealand) Allan H. Seager | 1:13.9 |
| 5 | (Canada) Leonard Chase | 1:14.1 |
| 6 | (England) Bob Apel | 1:15.2 |
| 7 | (Canada) Bill Mahony | 1:15.2 |
| 8 | (Malaysia) Cheah Tong Kim | 1:15.9 |

=== 220y breaststroke ===
| Pos | Athlete | Time |
|---|---|---|
| 1 | (Australia) Ian O'Brien | 2:29.3 |
| 2 | (New Zealand) Tony Graham | 2:36.9 |
| 3 | (Canada) Bill Mahony | 2:38.9 |
| 4 | (New Zealand) Allan H. Seager | 2:41.6 |
| 5 | (England) Bob Apel | 2:44.0 |
| 6 | (England) Malcolm Tucker | 2:44.1 |
| 7 | (Canada) Leonard Chase | 2:45.2 |
| 8 | (Northern Ireland) Liam Ball | 2:48.4 |

=== 110y butterfly ===
| Pos | Athlete | Time |
|---|---|---|
| 1 | (Canada) Ron Jacks | 1:00.3 |
| 2 | (Australia) Graham Dunn | 1:00.9 |
| 3 | (England) Keith Bewley | 1:01.5 |
| 4 | (Canada) Tom Arusoo | 1:01.9 |
| 5 | (Australia) Brett Hill | 1:01.9 |
| 6 | (New Zealand) David Gerrard | 1:02.1 |
| 7 | (England) John Thurley | 1:02.5 |
| 8 | (Wales) Martyn Woodroffe | 1:04.0 |

=== 220y butterfly ===
| Pos | Athlete | Time |
|---|---|---|
| 1 | (New Zealand) David Gerrard | 2:12.7 |
| 2 | (Australia) Brett Hill | 2:12.8 |
| 3 | (Canada) Tom Arusoo | 2:14.2 |
| 4 | (Canada) Ron Jacks | 2:14.5 |
| 5 | (England) John Thurley | 2:15.9 |
| 6 | (Australia) Graham John Dunn | 2:16.7 |
| 7 | (England) Keith Bewley | 2:18.6 |
| 8 | (Canada) Gordon Eby | 2:22.3 |

=== 440y indiv medley ===
| Pos | Athlete | Time |
|---|---|---|
| 1 | (Australia) Peter Reynolds | 4:50.8 |
| 2 | (Canada) Ralph Hutton | 4:51.8 |
| 3 | (Canada) Sandy Gilchrist | 4:58.7 |
| 4 | (New Zealand) Allan H. Seager | 5:07.0 |
| 5 | (Australia) Karl Byrom | 5:07.4 |
| 6 | (England) Alan Kimber | 5:08.2 |
| 7 | (England) John Gordon | 5:15.5 |
| 8 | (Wales) Martyn Woodroffe | 5:21.3 |

=== 4×110 yd freestyle relay ===
| Pos | Athlete | Time |
|---|---|---|
| 1 | (Australia) Dickson, Ryan, Wenden, Windle | 3:35.6 |
| 2 | (Canada) Gilchrist, Hutton, Kasting, Jacks | 3:42.3 |
| 3 | (England) Jarvis, Martin-Dye, Turner, Lord | 3:43.7 |
| 4 | (Scotland) Brown, Black, McGregor, Galletly | 3:43.2 |
| 5 | (Wales) Lewis, Ross, Moran, Jones | 3:59.2 |
| 6 | (Jamaica) Phillipson, Nash, Rose, Wong | 4:07.3 |

=== 4×220 yd freestyle relay ===
| Pos | Athlete | Time |
|---|---|---|
| 1 | (Australia) Dickson, Wenden, Reynolds, Windle | 7:59.5 |
| 2 | (Canada) Gilchrist, Hutton, Kasting, Jacks | 8:15.0 |
| 3 | (England) Jarvis, Thurley, Bewley, Turner | 8:24.0 |
| 4 | (Jamaica) Phillipson, Nash, Alexander, Wong | 9:29.4 |

=== 4×110 yd medley relay ===
| Pos | Athlete | Time |
|---|---|---|
| 1 | (Canada) Gilchrist, Chase, Hutton, Jacks | 4:10.5 |
| 2 | (England) Bewley, Tucker, Turner, Jackson | 4:11.3 |
| 3 | (New Zealand) Gerrard, Graham, Brown, O'Carroll | 4:17.5 |
| 4 | (Wales) Ross, Woodroffe, Jones, Jenkins | 4:23.6 |
| 5 | (Scotland) Nelson, Henderson, Black, McGregor | 4:26.3 |
| 6 | (Singapore) Chan, Eu, Pong Pin, Heng Tan | 4:31.8 |
| 7 | (Jamaica) Henriques, Jones, Nash, Rose | 4:34.3 |
| - | (Australia) Reynolds, Dunn, O'Brien, Wenden | disq* |

- Australia finished first and broke the world record but were disualified for an illegal switchover

== Swimming (women) ==
=== 110y freestyle ===
| Pos | Athlete | Time |
|---|---|---|
| 1 | (Canada) Marion Lay | 1:02.3 |
| 2 | (Australia) Lyn Bell | 1:03.2 |
| 3 | (Australia) Jan Murphy | 1:03.4 |
| 4 | (England) Pauline Sillett | 1:03.4 |
| 5 | (Canada) Louise Kennedy | 1:03.6 |
| 6 | (Australia) Marion Heather Smith | 1:03.8 |
| 7 | (England) Jeanette Cave | 1:04.8 |
| 8 | (England) Diana Wilkinson | 1:05.3 |

=== 440y freestyle ===
| Pos | Athlete | Time |
|---|---|---|
| 1 | (Australia) Kathy Wainwright | 4:38.8 |
| 2 | (Australia) Jenny Thorn | 4:44.5 |
| 3 | (Australia) Kim Herford | 4:47.2 |
| 4 | (Canada) Jane Hughes | 4:50.7 |
| 5 | (England) Jeanette Cave | 4:54.9 |
| 6 | (England) Susan Williams | 4:58.4 |
| 7 | (Canada) Louise Kennedy | 5:03.5 |
| 8 | (England) Liz Long | 5:06.8 |

=== 110y backstroke ===
| Pos | Athlete | Time |
|---|---|---|
| 1 | (England) Linda Ludgrove | 1:09.2 |
| 2 | (Canada) Elaine Tanner | 1:09.9 |
| 3 | (England) Janet Franklin | 1:11.8 |
| 4 | (Australia) Allyson Margaret Mabb | 1:12.6 |
| 5 | (Canada) Louise Kennedy | 1:13.2 |
| 6 | (Scotland) Bobbie Robertson | 1:13.4 |
| 7 | (New Zealand) Margaret Macrae | 1:13.8 |
| 8 | (Trinidad and Tobago) Laura de Neef | 1:13.8 |

=== 220y backstroke ===
| Pos | Athlete | Time |
|---|---|---|
| 1 | (England) Linda Ludgrove | 2:28.5 |
| 2 | (Canada) Elaine Tanner | 2:29.7 |
| 3 | (New Zealand) Margaret Macrae | 2:34.7 |
| 4 | (Australia) Allyson Margaret Mabb | 2:35.7 |
| 5 | (England) Janet Franklin | 2:36.3 |
| 6 | (England) Christine Kindon | 2:38.8 |
| 7 | (Trinidad and Tobago) Laura de Neef | 2:39.9 |
| 8 | (Australia) Janet Steinbeck | 2:40.6 |

=== 110 yd breaststroke ===
| Pos | Athlete | Time |
|---|---|---|
| 1 | (England) Diana Harris | 1:19.7 mins |
| 2 | (England) Jill Slattery | 1:19.8 |
| 3 | (Australia) Heather Saville | 1:21.6 |
| 4 | (New Zealand) Vivien Haddon | 1:21.9 |
| 5 | (England) Stella Mitchell | 1:22.1 |
| 6 | (Scotland) Ann Baxter | 1:22.2 |
| 7 | (Canada) Donna Ross | 1:23.0 |
| 8 | (Dominion of Ceylon) Margaret de Saram | 1:25.0 |

=== 220 yd breaststroke ===
| Pos | Athlete | Time |
|---|---|---|
| 1 | (England) Jill Slattery | 2:50.3 |
| 2 | (England) Stella Mitchell | 2:50.3 |
| 3 | (New Zealand) Vivien Haddon | 2:53.9 |
| 4 | (Australia) Heather Saville | 2:54.4 |
| 5 | (England) Diana Harris | 2:55.0 |
| 6 | (Scotland) Ann Baxter | 2:59.8 |
| 7 | (Wales) Julie Bevan | 3:01.6 |
| 8 | (Canada) Donna Ross | 3:02.4 |

=== 110 yd butterfly ===
| Pos | Athlete | Time |
|---|---|---|
| 1 | (Canada) Elaine Tanner | 1:06.8 |
| 2 | (England) Judy Gegan | 1:09.3 |
| 3 | (England) Ann Barner | 1:09.7 |
| 4 | (England) Mary-Anne Cotterill | 1:10.3 |
| 5 | (Canada) Marion Lay | 1:11.1 |
| 6 | (Canada) Marilyn Corson | 1:11.1 |
| 7 | (Australia) Jill Pauline Groeger | 1:11.9 |
| 8 | (Australia) Jan Murphy | 1:14.1 |

=== 220 yd butterfly ===
| Pos | Athlete | Time |
|---|---|---|
| 1 | (Canada) Elaine Tanner | 2:29.9 |
| 2 | (Canada) Marilyn Corson | 2:34.8 |
| 3 | (England) Ann Barner | 2:35.0 |
| 4 | (New Zealand) Heather L. Kerr | 2:36.4 |
| 5 | (Australia) Jan Murphy | 2:36.5 |
| 6 | (England) Darryl Jones | 2:38.1 |
| 7 | (Australia) Jill Pauline Groeger | 2:39.9 |
| 8 | (Wales) Glenda Phillips | 2:42.3 |

=== 440 yd indiv medley ===
| Pos | Athlete | Time |
|---|---|---|
| 1 | (Canada) Elaine Tanner | 5:26.3 |
| 2 | (Australia) Jan Murphy | 5:28.1 |
| 3 | (Canada) Jane Hughes | 5:34.1 |
| 4 | (England) Susan Williams | 5:34.2 |
| 5 | (England) Judith Turnbull | 5:42.5 |
| 6 | (England) Darryl Jones | 5:43.9 |
| 7 | (Canada) Barbara Hounsell | 5:46.4 |
| 8 | (New Zealand) Tui Shipston | 5:49.3 |

=== 4×110 yd freestyle relay ===
| Pos | Athlete | Time |
|---|---|---|
| 1 | (Canada) Tanner, Hughes, Kennedy, Lay | 4:10.8 mins |
| 2 | (Australia) Steinbeck, Murphy, Bell, Smith | 4:11.1 |
| 3 | (England) Wilkinson, Cave, Sillett, Cope | 4:17.3 |
| 4 | (Jamaica) Chung, Lee, Hart, Rose | 4:55.7 |

=== 4×110 yd medley relay ===
| Pos | Athlete | Time |
|---|---|---|
| 1 | (England) Harris, Gegan, Ludgrove, Sillett | 4:40.6 WR |
| 2 | (Canada) Ross, Tanner, Kennedy, Lay | 4:44.5 |
| 3 | (Australia) Mabb, Saville, Groeger, Bell | 4:45.7 |
| 4 | (Scotland) Robertson, Baxter, Kellock, Stewart | 4:56.9 |
| 5 | (New Zealand) Macrae, Haddon, Kerr, Shipston | 5:32.7 |
| 6 | (Jamaica) Chung, Hart, Rose | 5:32.7 |
