= British Diving Championships – 10 metre platform diving winners =

British diving competition

The British Diving Championships - platform winners formerly the (Amateur Swimming Association (ASA) National Championships) are listed below.

The diving championships were part of the National Swimming Championships for 13 years until 1965 when it separated.

The championships were not held in 2021 due to the COVID-19 pandemic.

== Past winners ==
Year	Men's champion	Women's champion	Ref
	Highboard	Highboard	
1953	Peter Tarsey	Ann Long	
1954	Tony Turner	Ann Long	
1955	Peter Squires	Charmain Welsh	
1956	Peter Tarsey	Charmain Welsh	
1957		Charmain Welsh	
1958	Brian Phelps	Charmain Welsh	
1959	Brian Phelps	Ann Long	
1960	Brian Phelps	Norma Thomas	
1961	Brian Phelps	Norma Thomas	
1962	Brian Phelps	Margaret Austen	
1963	Tony Kitcher	Joy Newman	
1964	Brian Phelps	Frances Cramp	
1965	Brian Phelps	Frances Cramp	
1966	Brian Phelps	Frances Cramp	
1967	David Priestley	Mandi Haswell	
1968	David Priestley	Mandi Haswell	
1969		Beverly Boys	
1970		Shelagh Burrow	
1971	Andrew Gill	Beverly Williams	
1972	Frank Dufficy	Beverly Williams	
1973	Frank Dufficy	Helen Koppell	
1974			
1975	Martyn Brown	Beverly Williams	
1976			
1977			
1978			
1979			
1980	Chris Snode	Marion Saunders	
1981			
1982			
1983			
1984	Bob Morgan		
1985			
1986			
1987			
1988			
1989			
1990			
1991			
1992			
1993			
1994			
1995			
1996			
1997			
1998			
1999			
2000			
2001			
2002			
2003			
2004			
2005			
2006	Peter Waterfield	Sarah Barrow	
2007	Peter Waterfield	Stacie Powell	
2008	Tom Daley	Brooke Graddon	
2009	Tom Daley	Sarah Barrow	
2010	Peter Waterfield	Sarah Barrow	
2011	Peter Waterfield	Tonia Couch	
2012	Tom Daley	Stacie Powell	
2013	Tom Daley	Tonia Couch	
2014	Matthew Dixon	Victoria Vincent	
2015	Tom Daley	Lois Toulson	
2016	Tom Daley	Sarah Barrow	
2017	Matty Lee	Lois Toulson	
2018	Matthew Dixon	Lois Toulson	
2019	Noah Williams	Lois Toulson	
2020	Matty Lee	Andrea Spendolini-Sirieix	
2022	Matty Lee	Eden Cheng	
2023	Kyle Kothari	Andrea Spendolini-Sirieix	
2024	Noah Williams	Andrea Spendolini-Sirieix	
2025	Euan McCabe	Maisie Bond	

== See also ==
- British Swimming
