= John Miles =

John Miles may refer to:

== Politicians ==
- John Miles (Australian politician) (1930–2010), Australian politician and member of the Victorian Legislative Council
- John E. Miles (1884–1971), U.S. Representative from New Mexico
- John George Miles (1838–1884), New Zealand politician
- John Miles (MP for Bristol) (1817–1878), British member of parliament for Bristol
- Jack Miles (political activist) (1888–1969), Scottish-born Australian communist leader
- John Miles (fl. 1404), British member of parliament for Great Grimsby

== Sports ==
- John Miles (footballer) (born 1981), English footballer
- John Miles (racing driver) (1943–2018), British former Formula One driver
- John Miles (baseball) (1922–2013), baseball player
- Johnny Miles (1905–2003), Canadian marathon runner
- Johnny Miles (footballer) (born 1945), Australian rules footballer
- John Miles (diver), English diver

== Others ==
- John Miles, developer of the Miles Sound System
- John Miles (businessman) (1816–1886), English bookseller and major North London landowner
- John Miles (actor) (1923–2006), American actor
- John Miles (musician) (1949–2021), English vocalist, guitarist and keyboard player
- John DeBras Miles (1832–1925), Indian agent for the Cheyenne and Arapaho Indian Reservation
- John 'Smoaker' Miles (1728–1797), Brighton bather to the Prince Regent
- John W. Miles (1920–2008), professor in theoretical fluid mechanics
- John Myles (minister) (c. 1621–1683), also known as "Miles", the founder of the earliest recorded Baptist Church in Wales
- Jack Miles (born 1942), American author
- John Campbell Miles (1883–1965), Australian prospector and pastoral worker
- John Miles (microbiologist) (1913–2004), New Zealand microbiologist and epidemiologist

== See also ==
- John Myles (disambiguation)
- Jack Miles (disambiguation)
