= Michael Turner (swimmer) =

English swimmer (1948–2020)

Personal information
- Nationality: British (English)
- Born: 16 June 1948 Gatley, Stockport, England
- Died: 8 December 2020 (aged 72)

Sport
- Sport: Swimming
- Event: Freestyle
- Club: Stockport SC
Medal record
Men's swimming
Representing England
British Empire and Commonwealth Games
Silver medal – second place	1966 Kingston	4×100 yd medley
Bronze medal – third place	1966 Kingston	4×100 yd freestyle
Bronze medal – third place	1966 Kingston	4×200 yd freestyle
Representing Great Britain
Universiade
Silver medal – second place	1967 Tokyo	4×100 yd freestyle

Michael H. Turner (16 June 1948 – 8 December 2020) was an English competitive swimmer who represented Great Britain at the Olympics and World University Games, and England in the Commonwealth Games, during the 1960s.

== Biography ==
Turner competed in freestyle swimming events. He represented Great Britain at the 1968 Summer Olympics in Mexico City, in the men's 4×100-metre freestyle relay.

Turner represented the England team at the 1966 British Empire and Commonwealth Games in Kingston, Jamaica, collecting medals in all three men's team relay events.

He won a bronze medal with Tony Jarvis, John Martin-Dye and Bob Lord in the 4 x 110 yards freestyle relay, a bronze medal with John Thurley, Keith Bewley and Jarvis, in the 4 x220 yards freestyle relay and a silver with Keith Bewley, Neil Jackson and Malcolm Tucker in the medley relay.

Turner died on 8 December 2020.

== See also ==
- List of Commonwealth Games medallists in swimming (men)
