= Hilton Brown (swimmer) =

New Zealand swimmer

Personal information
- Born: Hilton Wallace Brown; 13 December 1946 (age 79) Auckland, New Zealand
- Education: Avondale College
- Spouse: Catherine Margison (m. 1970)

Sport
- Country: New Zealand
- Sport: Swimming
- Event: Backstroke
Medal record
Men's swimming
Representing New Zealand
British Empire and Commonwealth Games
Bronze medal – third place	1966 Kingston	4 × 110 yards medley relay

Hilton Wallace Brown (born 13 December 1946) is a New Zealand swimming coach and former competitive swimmer who won a bronze medal for his country at the 1966 British Empire and Commonwealth Games.

== Early life and family ==
Brown was born in Auckland on 13 December 1946, the son of Patricia and Wallace Brown, and was educated at Avondale College. In 1970, he married Catherine Margison, and the couple went on to have three children.

== Swimming ==
=== Competitor ===
At the 1966 British Empire and Commonwealth Games in Kingston, Brown won the bronze medal in the men's 440 yards medley relay, alongside David Gerrard, Tony Graham, and Paddy O'Carroll. He also competed in the men's 110 and 220 yards backstroke at the same meet. He finished fifth in the final of the 220 yards backstroke, while in the 110 yards backstroke he finished fifth in his heat and did not progress to the final.

=== Coach ===
Brown went on to have a career as a swimming coach, and coached New Zealand representatives including Paul Kingsman, Anthony Mosse, and triathlete Rick Wells. Hilton was the New Zealand team swimming coach at the 1990 Commonwealth Games in Auckland, and he was awarded the New Zealand 1990 Commemoration Medal.

== See also ==
- List of Commonwealth Games medallists in swimming (men)
