= Janet Franklin (swimmer) =

English swimmer

Personal information
- Nationality: British (English)
- Born: 1948 (age 77–78) Taunton, England

Sport
- Sport: Swimming
- Event: Backstroke
- Club: Taunton Swimming Club
Medal record
Swimming
Representing England
British Empire & Commonwealth Games
Bronze medal – third place	1966 Kingston	110y backstroke

Janet A. Franklin (born 1948), is a female retired swimmer who competed for England.

== Biography ==
Franklin represented the England team and won a bronze medal in the 100 yards backstroke event, at the 1966 British Empire and Commonwealth Games in Kingston, Jamaica.

She was the British number two for most of her career behind Linda Ludgrove.
