= Bob Lord (swimmer) =

British swimmer (born 1945)

Personal information
- Nationality: British (English)
- Born: 5 June 1945 (age 81) Coventry, England
- Height: 175 cm (5 ft 9 in)
- Weight: 65 kg (143 lb)

Sport
- Sport: Swimming
- Strokes: Freestyle
- Club: City of Coventry SC
Medal record
Men's swimming
Representing England
British Empire and Commonwealth Games
Bronze medal – third place	1966 Kingston	4×110 yd freestyle

Robert Thomas "Bob" Lord (born 5 June 1945) is a male British former swimmer who competed in four events at the 1964 Summer Olympics.

== Biography ==
Lord won the 1965 British championship over 100 metres freestyle.

Lord represented the England team at the 1966 British Empire and Commonwealth Games in Kingston, Jamaica, where he participated in the 110y freestyle and 4 x100 relay. He won a bronze medal with Tony Jarvis, John Martin-Dye and Michael Turner in the 4 x 110 yards freestyle relay.
