= Andy Wilson (swimmer) =

British swimmer

Personal information
- Nationality: British (English)
- Born: c.1947 England

Sport
- Sport: Swimming
- Event: freestyle
- Club: St James SC, Stoke Newington

Andrew F. Wilson (born c.1947) is a former international swimmer from England who competed at the Commonwealth Games. He specialised in the longer freestyle events.

== Biography ==
Wilson was educated at Dulwich School and was a member of the St James' Swimming Club in Stoke Newington and was an international swimmer for Great Britain.

Wilson represented the England team at the 1966 British Empire and Commonwealth Games in Kingston, Jamaica, where he competed in the 1650 yards freestyle event.
