= British swimming champions – 400 metres freestyle winners =

British swimming event

The British swimming champions over 400 metres freestyle, formerly the (Amateur Swimming Association (ASA) National Championships) are listed below.

The event was originally contested over 440 yards and then switched to the metric conversion of 400 metres in 1971.

The most successful male and female competitors in the history of the event are Paul Palmer and James Guy with six titles, and Liz Long and Sarah Hardcastle with five titles each. Palmer, Long, Brian Brinkley and James Guy share the record for consecutive titles at four. The current champions are James Guy and Megan Barnes.

== 400 metres freestyle champions ==
Year	Men's champion	Women's champion
	440 yards	440 yards
1946	Jack Hale	Nancy Riach
1947	Jack Hale	Catherine Gibson
1948	Jack Hale	Catherine Gibson
1949	Per-Olof Östrand	Margaret Wellington
1950	Jack Wardrop	Daphne Wilkinson
1951	Jack Wardrop	Daphne Wilkinson
1952	Jack Wardrop	Daphne Wilkinson
1953		
1954	Graham Symonds	Christine Brown
1955	Neil McKechnie	Joyce Clarke
1956	Neil McKechnie	Margaret Girvan
1957	Bob Sreenan	Elspeth Ferguson
1958	Ian Black	Elspeth Ferguson
1959	Ian Black	Natalie Steward
1960	John Martin-Dye	Liz Long
1961	John Martin-Dye	Nan Rae
1962	Richard Campion	Liz Long
1963	John Martin-Dye	Liz Long
1964	Geoff Grylls	Liz Long
1965	Geoff Grylls	Liz Long
1966	Alan Kimber	Jeanette Cave
1967	Alan Kimber	Susan Williams
1968	Tony Jarvis	Sally Davison
1969	Ron Jacks	Susan Williams
1970	Raymond Terrell	Judith Wright
	400 metres	400 metres
1971	Brian Brinkley	Lesley Allardice
1972	Brian Brinkley	June Green
1973	Brian Brinkley	June Green
1974	Brian Brinkley	Leslie Cliff
1975	Alan McClatchey	Diane Walker
1976	Alan McClatchey	Moira Houston
1977	Gordon Downie	Sharron Davies
1978	Simon Gray	Sharron Davies
1979		Sharron Davies
1980	Andrew Astbury	Jackie Willmott
1981	Andrew Astbury	Jackie Willmott
1982	Andrew Astbury	June Croft
1983	John Davey	Jackie Willmott
1984	John Davey	Sarah Hardcastle
1985	Paul Easter	Karen Mellor
1986	Kevin Boyd	Sarah Hardcastle
1987	Kevin Boyd	Ruth Gilfillan
1988	Paul Howe	Ruth Gilfillan
1989	Campbell McNeil	Karen Mellor
1990	Paul Howe	Karen Mellor
1991	Paul Howe	Ruth Gilfillan
1992	Paul Palmer	Karen Pickering
1993	Paul Palmer	Sarah Hardcastle
1994	Steven Mellor	Sarah Hardcastle
1995	Ian Wilson	Sarah Hardcastle
1996	Ian Wilson	Sarah Collings
1997	Graeme Smith	Vicky Horner
1998	Paul Palmer	Vicky Horner
1999	Paul Palmer	Natalia Baranovskaya
2000	Paul Palmer	Vicky Horner
2001	Paul Palmer	Karen Legg
2002	James Salter	Karen Pickering
2003	James Salter	Karen Pickering
2004	Simon Burnett	Melanie Marshall
2005	David Carry	Melanie Marshall
2006	David Carry	Joanne Jackson
2007	Daniel Coombs	Kate Richardson
2008	Ross Davenport	Rebecca Adlington
2009	Ross Davenport	Joanne Jackson
2010	Robert Bale	Rebecca Adlington
2011	Ross Davenport	Rebecca Adlington
2012	Robert Renwick	Rebecca Turner
2013	Robert Renwick	Eleanor Faulkner
2014	James Guy	Siobhan-Marie O'Connor
2015	James Guy	Jazmin Carlin
2016	James Guy	Jazmin Carlin
2017	James Guy	Eleanor Faulkner
2018	Stephen Milne	Kathryn Greenslade
2019	Duncan Scott	Freya Anderson
Not held during 2020 and 2021 due to the COVID-19 pandemic
2022	Daniel Jervis	Freya Anderson
2023	Luke Turley	Freya Colbert
2024	Kieran Bird	Holly Hibbott
2025	James Guy	Megan Barnes
2026	James Guy	Freya Colbert

== See also ==
- Aquatics GB
- List of British Swimming champions
