= John Palin =

John Palin may refer to:

- John Palin (politician) (1870–1934), British politician
- John Palin (sport shooter) (1934–2025), British former sports shooter
