= Eleanor Stewart (swimmer) =

British swimmer

Personal information
- Nationality: British (Scottish)
- Born: 1945 Scotland
- Died: 2018

Sport
- Sport: Swimming
- Event(s): Butterfly, Freestyle, Medley
- Club: Kilmarnock ASC

Eleanor Stewart (1945 – 2018) was an international swimmer from Scotland who competed at the Commonwealth Games.

== Biography ==
Stewart was a member of the Kilmarnock Amateur Swimming Club and was the 1964 Scottish champion over four distances; the 110 and 220 yards butterfly and the 110 and 220 yards freestyle.

Stewart specialised in the butterfly but was also proficient in freestyle. On 12 June 1965 she broke her own Scottish record over the 100 metres butterfly and was the Scottish medley champion in 1965 and 1966.

Stewart represented the Scotland team at the 1966 British Empire and Commonwealth Games in Kingston, Jamaica, where she participated in three events and finished fourth in the 4 x 110 yards medley relay, with Bobbie Robertson, Ann Baxter and Fiona Kellock.

She died in January 2018.
