= Kindon (surname) =

Kindon is a surname. Notable people with the surname include:

- Christine Kindon (born 1949), British swimmer
- Steve Kindon (born 1950), British footballer
