= John Thurley =

British swimmer (born 1947)

Personal information
- Nationality: British (English)
- Born: 12 December 1947 (age 78) London, England
- Height: 178 cm (5 ft 10 in)
- Weight: 73 kg (161 lb)

Sport
- Sport: Swimming
- Strokes: Freestyle, butterfly
- Club: Sutton and Cheam Swimming Club
Medal record
Men's swimming
Representing England
British Empire and Commonwealth Games
Bronze medal – third place	1966 Kingston	4×220 yd freestyle

John Philip Thurley (born 12 December 1947) is a male British former swimmer. Thurley competed at the 1964 Summer Olympics and the 1968 Summer Olympics.

== Biography ==
At the 1964 Olympic Games in Tokyo, Thurley competed in the 400 metres freestyle, 1,500 metres Freestyle and 4 × 200 metres freestyle relay events.

At the ASA National British Championships he won the 110 yards butterfly title in 1966 and the 220 yards butterfly title in 1966.

Thurley represented the England team at the 1966 British Empire and Commonwealth Games in Kingston, Jamaica, competing in four events. He won a bronze medal with Michael Turner, Keith Bewley and Tony Jarvis, in the 4 x220 yards freestyle relay.

A further Olympic appearance ensued at the 1968 Olympic Games in Mexico.
