= Alun Lewis (swimmer) =

Welsh swimmer

Personal information
- Nationality: British (Welsh)
- Born: Wales

Sport
- Sport: swimming
- Event: freestyle
- Club: St James' Swimming Club. London

Alun Lewis is a former swimmer from Wales, who competed at the 1966 British Empire and Commonwealth Games (now Commonwealth Games).

== Biography ==
Lewis was a member of the St James' Swimming Club in London and a Welsh international swimmer and Welsh captain, who specialised in freestyle.

He represented the 1966 Welsh team at the 1966 British Empire and Commonwealth Games in Kingston, Jamaica, participating in the 110 yards freestyle event and the freestyle relay with Roddy Jones, Kevan Moran and Keith Ross.

Lewis, a student at Cardiff Training College, was in the Welsh team during the 1967 international against Ireland.
