= Bobbie Robertson =

British swimmer

Personal information
- Nationality: British (Scottish)
- Born: c.1949 Scotland

Sport
- Sport: Swimming
- Event: Backstroke
- Club: Leith Amateur Swimming Club

Bobbie Robertson (born c.1949) is a former international swimmer from Scotland who competed at the Commonwealth Games.

== Biography ==
Robertson was a member of the Leith Amateur Swimming Club and won both the senior and junior Scottish backstroke titles at the 1965 Scottish Championships. She then broke the Scottish record at the 1965 British Championships.

Robertson represented the Scotland team at the 1966 British Empire and Commonwealth Games in Kingston, Jamaica, where she participated in three events and finished fourth in the 4 x 110 yards medley relay, with Fiona Kellock, Ann Baxter and Eleanor Stewart.

In March 1969 she was living at Blink Bonny Avenue, Blackhall in Edinburgh and became engaged to Hugh Russell before marrying in October.
