= Robert Hassell =

Robert Hassell may refer to:

- Robert Hassell III (born 2001), American baseball outfielder
- Robert Hassell (sport shooter) (1929–2004), British sport shooter
- Robert Hassell (swimmer)
