= Hugh Jenkins =

Hugh Jenkins may refer to:

- Hugh Jenkins, Baron Jenkins of Putney (1908–2004), British politician
- Hugh S. Jenkins (1903–1976), American politician
- Hugh Jenkins (swimmer) (born 1943), Welsh swimmer
