= Keith Ross =

Keith Ross may refer to:

- Ian Keith (Keith Ross, 1899–1960), American actor
- Keith Ross (surgeon) (1927–2003), British consultant cardiac surgeon
- Keith W. Ross, American scholar who researches computer networking and online social networks
- Keith Ross (swimmer), Welsh swimmer
