= Kevan Moran =

Welsh swimmer

Personal information
- Nationality: British (Welsh)
- Born: Wales

Sport
- Sport: swimming
- Event: freestyle
- Club: Swansea Swimming Club

Kevan Moran is a former swimmer from Wales, who competed at the 1966 British Empire and Commonwealth Games (now Commonwealth Games).

== Biography ==
Moran was a member of the Swansea Swimming Club and was a Welsh record holder.

He represented the 1966 Welsh team at the 1966 British Empire and Commonwealth Games in Kingston, Jamaica, participating in the 110 yards freestyle event and the freestyle relay with Roddy Jones, Alun Lewis and Keith Ross.

Moran won the 220 yards freestyle event in July 1967 at the Welsh Championships.
