= Bill Wilkinson (athlete) =

British Athlete

Personal information
- Nationality: British (English)
- Born: 4 August 1934

Sport
- Sport: Athletics
- Event: Long-distance running
- Club: Saltwell Harriers; Bromsgrove and Redditch AC

William "Bill" Wilkinson (born 4 August 1934) is a former athlete who competed for England.

== Biography ==
Wilkinson was selected by England to represent his country in athletics events. He was late to athletics and gained his England debut during 1965 (aged 31) and when running for St Albans.

He was selected for the 5,000 metres at the 1966 European Athletics Championships but had to withdraw through injury. Later the same year he represented the England team in the 3 miles event, at the 1966 British Empire and Commonwealth Games in Kingston, Jamaica.

He was a member of the Saltwell Harriers Athletics Club and later the Bromsgrove and Redditch Club.

== Personal life ==
Wilkinson moved to live in Birmingham and was an electricity generating board engineer by trade.
