= Jack Miles (disambiguation) =

Jack Miles is an author.

Jack Miles may also refer to:

- Jack Miles (political activist) (1888–1969), Scottish-born Australian stonemason and communist leader
- Jack Miles (rugby union) (1880–1953), English rugby union player

== See also ==
- John Miles (disambiguation)
