= Judith Turnbull =

British

Personal information
- Nationality: British (English)
- Born: First quarter 1947 West Hartlepool, England

Sport
- Sport: Swimming
- Event: Medley
- Club: West Hartlepool SC

Judith A. Turnbull (born 1947), is a female retired swimmer who competed for England.

== Biography ==
Turnbull became a National champion at the ASA National British Championships when she won the 220 yards medley title in 1966.

Turnbull represented the England team in the 440 yards medley event, at the 1966 British Empire and Commonwealth Games in Kingston, Jamaica, where she reached the final of the 440 yards individual medley.
