= John Gordon (swimmer) =

British swimmer

Personal information
- Nationality: British (English)
- Born: 1945 England
- Died: 2021 (aged 76)

Sport
- Sport: Swimming
- Event(s): Breaststroke, medley, backstroke
- Club: Otter SC, London; Polytechnic SC, London

John Gordon (1945 – 2021) was an international swimmer from England who competed at the Commonwealth Games.

== Biography ==
Gordon was a member of the Otter Swimming Club in London. A post office worker by profession in Fulham, he missed a year's swimming through illness with pleurisy during 1963.

Gordon received a late call-up to represent the England team at the 1966 British Empire and Commonwealth Games in Kingston, Jamaica, where he replaced David Finnigan and reached the final of the 440 yards medley event.

He later swam for the Polytechnic Swimming Club.

In 1977, Gordon founded the Spencer Masters Swim Team. He died in 2021 at the age of 76.
