= Richard Cade =

British sports shooter

Personal information
- Nationality: British (English)
- Born: Q2, 1938 St Albans, England

Sport
- Sport: Sports shooting
- Event: Fullbore rifle
- Club: North London Rifle Club

Richard J. Cade (born 1938) is a former international sports shooter who competed at the Commonwealth Games.

== Biography ==
Cade born in 1938, was a chartered account by profession. He lived at 67 Elmwood in Welwyn Garden City and represented Hertfordshire at county level.

Cade shot for the North London Rifle Club and won the silver medal for the highest score in the semi-final of the Queen's Prize at the National Shooting Centre at Bisley in July 1966.

Cade represented the England team at the 1966 British Empire and Commonwealth Games in Kingston, Jamaica. He competed in the fullbore rifle Queens prize event, where he qualified for the final.

Shortly after the Games, he won the Ladies of the County Cup to become Hertfordshire champion for a second consecutive year.
