= Dennis Young (diver) =

English diver

Personal information
- Nationality: British (English)
- Born: 1944 (age 81–82) Nelson, England

Sport
- Sport: Diving
- Event(s): Springboard, Highboard
- Club: Nelson Baths

Dennis A. Young (born 1944), is a former diver who competed for England at the Commonwealth Games.

== Biography ==
Young represented the England team in the 3 metres springboard at the 1962 British Empire and Commonwealth Games in Perth, Western Australia.

Young won the 1964 British title in the 3 metre springboard.

In March 1966, Young announced his retirement from the sport but changed his mind soon after.

He was subsequently selected again for the England team at the 1966 British Empire and Commonwealth Games in Kingston, Jamaica, in the 3 metres springboard event. At the time of the Games he was a pool supervisor in Droitwich.
