= Ann Barner =

English swimmer

Personal information
- Nationality: British (english)
- Born: Fourth quarter 1950 York, England

Sport
- Sport: Swimming
- Event: butterfly
- Club: York City Baths Club
Medal record
Swimming
Representing England
British Empire & Commonwealth Games
Bronze medal – third place	1966 Kingston	110y butterfly
Bronze medal – third place	1966 Kingston	220y butterfly

Ann Barner (born 1950), is a female retired swimmer who competed for England.

== Biography ==
Barner represented England and won two bronze medals in the butterfly events, at the 1966 British Empire and Commonwealth Games in Kingston, Jamaica.

At the ASA National British Championships she won the 110 yards butterfly title in 1966 and 1967 and the 220 yards butterfly title in 1966 and 1967. During 1966 edition she broke 18 British or English records in a six-week period and beat three records when winning the National Championships.
