= Susan Cope =

English swimmer (born 1947)

Personal information
- Nationality: British (English)
- Born: First quarter 1947 Bristol, England

Sport
- Sport: Swimming
- Event: freestyle
- Club: Bristol Central SC; Bristol Soundwell SC
Medal record
Swimming
Representing England
British Empire & Commonwealth Games
Bronze medal – third place	1966 Kingston	440y freestyle relay

Susan Cope (born 1947), is a female retired swimmer who competed for England.

== Biography ==
In 1966, Cope was a physical education student and made her international debut for Great Britain in April 1966.

Cope represented the England team and won a bronze medal in the 440 yards freestyle relay, at the 1966 British Empire and Commonwealth Games in Kingston, Jamaica.
