= Hugh Jenkins (swimmer) =

British swimmer

Personal information
- Nationality: British (Welsh)
- Born: 1943 (age 81–82) Newport, Wales

Sport
- Sport: Swimming
- Event: Breaststroke
- Club: Howardian High School SC

Ronald Hugh Jenkins (born 1943) is a former Welsh swimmer who specialised in breaststroke and competed at two Commonwealth Games.

== Biography ==
Jenkins attended the Howardian High School and while a pupil at the school he became a world class swimmer in the breastroke. He became the Welsh junior and Glamorgan senior breaststroke champion. Jenkins also held the junior 100 yards butterfly record in 1958 with a time of 74.4 seconds. He was a member of the Howardian High School Swimming Club.

He represented the Welsh team at the 1958 British Empire and Commonwealth Games in Cardiff, Wales, where he reached the final of the 220 yards breaststroke. His time qualifying for the final was another junior record of 2min 52.6 sec.

In 1965 Jenkins was at the Cardiff Teacher Training College.

Jenkins went to his second Commonwealth Games, representing the 1966 Welsh team at the 1966 British Empire and Commonwealth Games in Kingston, Jamaica, participating in the breaststroke events and the medley relay with Roddy Jones, Martyn Woodroffe and Keith Ross.
