= Julie Bevan =

Welsh swimmer

Personal information
- Nationality: British (Welsh)
- Born: 1952 Bedwellty, Wales

Sport
- Sport: swimming
- Event: Backstroke
- Club: Newport Swimming Club

Julie L. Bevan (born 1952) is a former swimmer from Wales, who competed at the 1966 British Empire and Commonwealth Games (now Commonwealth Games).

== Biography ==
Bevan was a member of the Newport Swimming Club and at the age of 13 became the first Welsh woman to swim the 220 yards breaststroke in under three minutes.

She represented the 1966 Welsh team at the 1966 British Empire and Commonwealth Games in Kingston, Jamaica, participating in the backstroke events.

Bevan won the 220 yards breaststroke event in July 1967 at the Welsh Championships.
