= England at the 1966 British Empire and Commonwealth Games =

- CG code: ENG
- CGA: Commonwealth Games England

in Kingston, Jamaica
- Medals Ranked 1st: Gold 33 Silver 24 Bronze 23 Total 80

British Empire and Commonwealth Games appearances
- 1930; 1934; 1938; 1950; 1954; 1958; 1962; 1966; 1970; 1974; 1978; 1982; 1986; 1990; 1994; 1998; 2002; 2006; 2010; 2014; 2018; 2022; 2026; 2030

England competed at the 1966 British Empire and Commonwealth Games in Kingston, Jamaica, from 4 to 13 August 1966.

England finished at the top of the medal table with 33 gold medals, 24 silver medals and 23 bronze medals.

== Medal table (top three) ==
Rank	Nation	Gold	Silver	Bronze	Total
1	England	33	24	23	80
2	Australia	23	28	22	73
3	Canada	14	20	23	57
Totals (3 entries)		70	72	68	210

== Team ==
=== Athletics ===
Men

Athlete	Events	Club	Medals
Bill Adcocks	marathon	Coventry Godiva	Silver medal
John Adey	440y, relay	Finchley Harriers	Bronze medal
Fred Alsop	triple jump & long jump	Hornchurch Harriers	Bronze medal
John Boulter	880y & 1 mile	Achilles Club	
Trevor Burton	pole vault	Chelmsford AC	
Chris Carter	880y	Brighton & Hove AC	
Mel Cheskin	220y, relay	Polytechnic Harriers	
Derek Clarke	decathlon	Royal Air Force AC	
Dave Dear	220y, relay	Southampton AAC	
Neill Duggan	1 mile	Sparkhill Harriers	
John FitzSimons	javelin	Polytechnic Harriers	Gold medal
Roy Fowler	6 miles	North Staffs and Stone AC	
Bob Frith	100y	Polytechnic Harriers	
Dave Gaskin	decathlon & long jump	Liverpool Pembroke AC	
Tim Graham	440y, relay	Polytechnic Harriers	Bronze medal
David Hemery	120y hurdles	Ruislip and Northwood AC	Gold medal
Maurice Herriott	3,000m steeplechase	Sparkhill Harriers	
Ron Hill	6 miles	Bolton United	
David Jones	220y, relay	Woodford Green AC	
Barrie Kelly	100y, relay	Bury and Radcliffe AC	
Brian Kilby	marathon	Coventry Godiva	
Bob McStocker	100y	Ilford AC	
Ray Middleton	20 mile walk	Belgrave Harriers	Silver medal
Mike Parker	120y hurdles	Achilles Club	Silver medal
Howard Payne	hammer	Birchfield Harriers	Gold medal
Ernie Pomfret	3,000m steeplechase	Houghton Harriers	
Allan Rushmer	3 miles	Tipton Harriers	Bronze medal
Peter Seddon	hammer	British Army AC	
John Sherwood	440y hurdles	Loughborough Colleges	
Alan Simpson	1 mile	Rotherham Harriers & AC	Silver medal
Gerald Stevens	3,000m steeplechase	Reading AC	
Bill Tancred	discus & shot put	British Army AC	
Laurie Taitt	120y hurdles	Herne Hill Harriers	
Dick Taylor	3 miles	Coventry Godiva	
Don Thompson	20 mile walk	Metropolitan WC, London	
Dave Travis	javelin	Surrey AC	
Bruce Tulloh	3 miles, 6 miles	Portsmouth AC	
Michael Varah	880y	Loughborough Colleges	
Ron Wallwork	20 mile walk	Lancashire Walking Club	Gold medal
Peter Warden	440y hurdles, relay	Airedale and Spen Valley	,
Walter Wilkinson	1 mile	Longwood Harriers	
Bill Wilkinson	3 miles	Saltwell Harriers	
Martin Winbolt-Lewis	440y, relay	Dorking AC	Bronze medal
Robin Woodland	440y hurdles	Hercules AC	

Women

Athlete	Events	Club	Medals
Brenda Bedford	shot put & discus	Hercules AC	
Lillian Board	440y	London Olympiades	
Pat Lowe	880y	Birchfield Harriers	
Joy Grieveson	440y	Darlington Harriers	
Jill Hall	100y, relay	Mitcham AC	,
Gwenda Matthews-Hurst	high jump & long jump	Ruislip and Northwood AC	
Sheila Parkin	long jump	Lady Mabel College P.E.	Silver medal
Pam Piercy	440 & 880y	Hull Achilles	
Sue Platt	javelin	London Olympiades	
Pat Pryce	80m hurdles	Ruislip and Northwood AC	
Mary Rand	80m hurdles, high jump & long jump	London Olympiades	Gold medal
Dorothy Shirley	high jump	Spartan LAC	Silver medal
Janet Simpson	100 & 220y, relay	London Olympiades	Silver medal
Daphne Slater	100 & 220y, relay	Birchfield Harriers	Silver medal
Anne Smith	880y	Mitcham AC	Bronze medal
Maureen Tranter	100 & 220y, relay	Bilston AC	Silver medal
Deidre Watkinson	440 & 880y	Gosport AC	Silver medal
Ann Wilson	80m hurdles, long jump & high jump	Southend AC	

=== Badminton ===
Men

Athlete	Events	Club	Medals
Colin Beacom	singles, doubles. mixed	Surrey	
David Horton	singles, doubles, mixed	Essex	Bronze medal
Tony Jordan	singles, doubles, mixed	Cheshire	Silver medal
Roger Mills	singles, doubles, mixed	Surrey	,

Women

Athlete	Events	Club	Medals
Angela Bairstow	singles, doubles, mixed	Surrey	,,
Jenny Horton	singles, doubles, mixed	Surrey	,
Iris Rogers	singles, doubles, mixed	Surrey	Silver medal
Ursula Smith	singles, doubles, mixed	Kent	,

=== Boxing ===
Athlete	Events	Club	Medals
Bobby Arthur	67 kg welterweight	Coventry Irish ABC	Silver medal
Johnny Clark	51 kg flyweight	Robert Browning BC, London	
Ken Cooper	57 kg featherweight	Kyrle Hall ABC, Birmingham	
Billy Hiatt	63.5 kg light-welterweight	Battersea ABC, London	
Mark Rowe	71 kg light-middleweight	Fitzroy Lodge ABC, London	Gold medal
Ron Thurston	60 kg lightweight	Raven BC, Warrington	Silver medal
Roger Tighe	81 kg light-heavyweight	Hull Boys' Club	Gold medal
John Turpin	75 kg middleweight	Rothwell Collliery ABC, Leeds	Bronze medal

=== Cycling ===
Athlete	Events	Club	Medals
Ian Alsop	scratch & 1 km time trial	Polytechnic CC	Gold medal
Reg Barnett	1,000m sprint	Old Kent CC	
Fred Booker	1,000m sprint & 1 km time trial	Rover Racing CC, Birmingham	Silver medal
Trevor Bull	scratch	Sheldon Heath CC	Bronze medal
John Clarey	road race	Woolwich CC	
Harry Jackson	4,000m pursuit	Portsmouth North End CC	
Brendan McKeown	4,000m pursuit	Welwyn Wheelers	
Dave Nie	road race	Dragon Road Club, London	
Hugh Porter	road race & 4,000m pursuit	Wolverhampton Wheelers	
Mick Shea	road race	Hemel Hempstead CC	
Dave Watkins	scratch & 1,000m sprint	Wyndham CC	
Billy Whiteside	1 km time trial	Kirkby CC	

=== Diving ===
Men

Athlete	Events	Club	Medals
John Miles	springboard & platform	Highgate DC	
Brian Phelps	springboard & platform	Highgate DC	,
Dennis Young	springboard	Nelson Baths	

Women

Athlete	Events	Club	Medals
Frances Cramp	platform	Isleworth Penguins SC	
Joy Newman	platform	slander Ladies DC	Gold medal
Kathy Rowlatt	springboard	Leyton	Gold medal

=== Fencing ===
Men

Athlete	Events	Club	Medals
John Rayden	sabre, sabre team	London Fencing Club	Gold medal
Ralph Cooperman	sabre, sabre team	Salle Paul Fencing Club	,
Bill Hoskyns	épée, foil, foil & épée team	Yeovil Fencing Club	,,
Peter Jacobs	épée, épée team	Thames Fencing Club	Gold medal
Allan Jay	foil, foil team	Salle Paul Fencing Club	,
Richard Oldcorn	sabre, sabre team	Liverpool YMCA	Gold medal
Graham Paul	foil, foil team	Salle Paul Fencing Club	,
John Pelling	épée, épée team	Grosvenor Fencing Club	,

Women

Athlete	Events	Club	Medals
Shirley Parker	foil, foil team	Polytechnic Fencing Club	,
Joyce Pearce	foil, foil team	London Fencing Club	Gold medal
Janet Wardell-Yerburgh	foil, foil team	Polytechnic Fencing Club	,

=== Shooting ===
Athlete	Events	Medals
Richard Cade	fullbore rifle Queens prize	
Anthony Chivers	50m free pistol	
Tony Clark	rapid fire pistol, centre fire pistol	,
Brian Girling	rapid fire pistol, centre fire pistol	
Francis Little	fullbore rifle Queens prize	
Peter Morgan	50m rifle prone	
Frank Pacey	50m rifle prone	
Charles Sexton	50m free pistol	Gold medal

=== Swimming ===
Men

Athlete	Events	Club	Medals
Bob Apel	110 & 220y breaststroke	Kettering ASC	
Keith Bewley	110 & 220y butterfly, relays	Bootle SC	,,
Tony Davidson	110 & 220y backstroke	Newcastle-under-Lyme SC	
John Gordon	220y breaststroke, 440y medley	Otter SC, London	
Neil Jackson	110 & 220y backstroke, relay	Southport SC	,
Tony Jarvis	440 & 1650y freestyle, relays	Otter SC, London	,
Alan Kimber	400 & 1650y freestyle, 440y medley	Southampton SC	
Bob Lord	110y freestyle, relay	City of Coventry SC	Bronze medal
John Martin-Dye	110y freestyle, relay	Penguin SC	Bronze medal
Jimmy Rogers	110 & 220y backstroke	St James SC, Stoke Newington	
John Thurley	110 & 220y butterfly, 440y freestyle, relay	Sutton and Cheam SC	Bronze medal
Malcolm Tucker	110 & 220y breaststroke, relay	Southall SC	,
Michael Turner	110y freestyle, relays	Stockport SC	,,
Andy Wilson	1650y freestyle	St James SC, Stoke Newington	

Women

Athlete	Events	Club	Medals
Ann Barner	110 & 220y butterfly	York City Baths Club	,
Jeanette Cave	110 & 440y freestyle, relay	Bristol Central SC	Bronze medal
Susan Cope	relay	Bristol Soundwell SC	Bronze medal
Mary-Anne Cotterill	110 & 220y butterfly	Watford SC	
Janet Franklin	110 & 200y backstroke	Taunton SC	Bronze medal
Judy Gegan	110y butterfly, relay	Beckenham Ladies SC	,
Diana Harris	110 & 220y breaststroke, relay	Beckenham Ladies SC	,
Darryl Jones	220y butterfly, 440y medley	Hampstead Ladies SC	
Christine Kindon	110 & 220y backstroke	West Hartlepool SC	
Liz Long	440y freestyle	Ilford SC	
Linda Ludgrove	110 & 220y backstroke, relay	Beckenham Ladies SC	,,
Stella Mitchell	110 & 220y breaststroke	Heston SC	Silver medal
Pauline Sillett	110y freestyle, relays	Radcliffe SC	,
Jill Slattery	110 & 220y breaststroke	Sheffield City SC	,
Judith Turnbull	440y medley	West Hartlepool SC	
Diana Wilkinson	110y freestyle, relay	Stockport SC	Bronze medal
Susan Williams	440y freestyle, 440y medley	Exeter SC	

=== Weightlifting ===
Athlete	Events	Club	Medals
Sylvanus Blackman	82.5 kg light-heavyweight	London	Silver medal
Laurie Levine	75 kg middleweight	Kentish Town	
George Manners	90 kg middle-heavyweight	Bethnal Green	Silver medal
Louis Martin	90 kg middle-heavyweight	Derby	Gold medal
Precious McKenzie	56 kg bantamweight	Northampton	Gold medal
George Newton	67.5 kg lightweight	Putney	Silver medal
Mike Pearman	82.5 kg light-heavyweight	Kentish Town	Bronze medal

=== Wrestling ===
Athlete	Events	Medals
Bert Aspen	62 kg featherweight	Bronze medal
Andy Bailey	57 kg bantamweight	
Stan Gilligan	68 kg lightweight	
Ronald Grinstead	82 kg middleweight	
Geoff Hill	90 kg light-heavyweight	
Denis McNamara	100 kg heavyweight	Bronze medal
Bert Owen	74 kg welterweight	
Alf Rhodes	52 kg flyweight	
