= Dave Gaskin =

English athlete

Personal information
- Nationality: British (English)
- Born: First quarter 1945 Liverpool, England

Sport
- Sport: Athletics
- Event: Decathlon / long jump
- Club: Liverpool Pembroke AC

David Marjoribanks Gaskin (born Q1. 1945), is a male former athlete who competed for England.

== Biography ==
Gaskin was selected by England to represent his country in decathlon and long jump events. He was a two times National championship runner-up in decathlon.

In 1966, he was serving with the Royal Air Force at Cranwell and was a member of the Liverpool Pembroke Athletic Club.

He represented the England team in the decathlon and long jump, at the 1966 British Empire and Commonwealth Games in Kingston, Jamaica.
