= Jeanette Cave =

British swimmer (born 1949)

Personal information
- Nationality: British (English)
- Born: First quarter 1949 Bristol, England

Sport
- Sport: Swimming
- Event: freestyle
- Club: Bristol Central SC
Medal record
Swimming
Representing England
British Empire & Commonwealth Games
Bronze medal – third place	1966 Kingston	440y freestyle relay

Jeanette C. Cave (born 1949), is a female retired swimmer who competed for England.

== Biography ==
Cave represented England and won a bronze medal in the 440 yards freestyle relay, at the 1966 British Empire and Commonwealth Games in Kingston, Jamaica. She also reached the finals of the 110 yards and 440 yards individual freestyle events.

During 1966, she won three National Championships in the 200 metres freestyle, 400 metres freestyle, and 800 metres freestyle.
