= John Miles (diver) =

English diver

Personal information
- Nationality: British (English)

Sport
- Sport: Diving
- Event(s): Springboard, Highboard
- Club: Highgate Diving Club

John Thomas Miles is a former diver who competed for England at the Commonwealth Games.

== Biography ==
Miles was a member of the Highgate Diving Club and was denied a British title at the British Diving Championships because of the domination of Brian Phelps during the period.

Miles represented the England team at the 1966 British Empire and Commonwealth Games in Kingston, Jamaica, in the 3 metres springboard and 10 metres platform event.

He was a British international from 1965 to 1968 and finished runner-up behind Welshman David Priestley at the 1968 national championships.
