= Alan Kimber =

English swimmer (1949–2012)

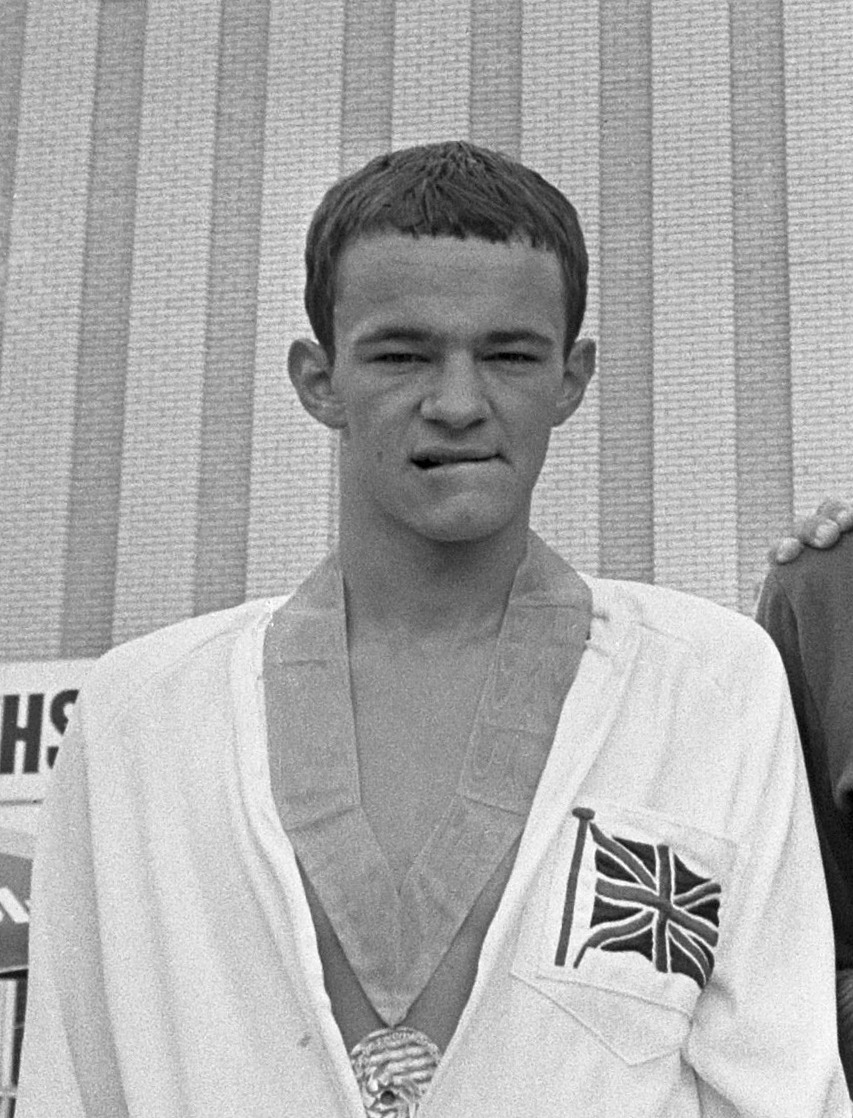
- Alan Kimber in 1966

Personal information
- Born: 1949 Southampton, England
- Died: 6 September 2012 (aged 63) Southampton, England

Sport
- Sport: Swimming
- Club: Southampton Swimming Club
Medal record
Representing United Kingdom
European Championships
Silver medal – second place	1966 Utrecht	1500 m freestyle

Alan Kimber (1949 – 6 September 2012) was an English international swimmer.

== Swimming career ==
Kimber started swimming aged 14, at Southampton Swimming Club, where he later coached after retirement from competitions.

Kimber won a silver medal in the 1500 m freestyle at the 1966 European Aquatics Championships. He represented the England team at the 1966 British Empire and Commonwealth Games in Kingston, Jamaica, where he participated in the 400 and 1650y freestyle and 440y medley events.

He missed the 1968 Summer Olympics due to a shoplifting conviction. Two years later he was expelled from the national team after an incident of noisy disturbance.

At the ASA National British Championships he won the 220 yards freestyle title in 1966, the 440 yards freestyle in 1966 and 1967, the 1966, 1967 and 1968 880 yards freestyle title and the 1650 yards freestyle titles in 1967 and 1968. He also won the 220 yards medley title in 1966 and the 440 yards medley title in 1966, 1967, and 1968.

== Personal life ==
He was married twice and had four sons: Anthony (b. 1974), Stuart (b. 1976), Ryan (b. 1978) and Andrew (b. 1987) and one daughterAnn (b. 1984). He died of cancer three weeks after being hospitalized.
