= Mick Shea =

English cyclist

Personal information
- Nationality: British (English)
- Born: 2 September 1939 (age 86) London, England
- Occupation: Gas Fitter/College Lecturer/Cyclist

Sport
- Sport: Cycling
- Club: Hemel Hempstead CC (amateur); Ross Wheelers, Holdsworth Cycling (pro)

Michael "Mick" A Shea (born 2 September 1939), is a male former cyclist who competed for England.

== Cycling career ==
Shea represented England at international level during the 1960s. He won the silver medal at the 1964 British National Road Race Championships.

He was selected for the England team in the road race, at the 1966 British Empire and Commonwealth Games in Kingston, Jamaica.

He was a member of the Hemel Hempstead Cycling Club before turning professional and joining the Holdsworth-Campognolo team.

In addition to his international appearances he won the British classic race known as the Archer Grand Prix.

== Notable Results ==
- 1960 - 1st in Archer R.C. Junior Road Race, Hillingdon, London
- 1962 - 45th in General Classification Tour of Britain, (Milk Race), Blackpool
- 1963 - 1st in Archer Grand Prix, Beaconsfield, London,
- 1963 - 1st in Lester Young Memorial, Borehamwood, Hertfordshire.
- 1963 - 75th in General Classification Peace Race, Berlin, German Democratic Republik
- 1963 - 1st in Brighton Trophy Grand Prix, Brighton
- 1964 - 2nd in National Championship, Road, Northampton
- 1964 - 1st in All London Championship Road, Surrey
- 1965 - 3rd in Archer Grand Prix, Beaconsfield, London,
- 1965 - 1st in Stage 3 Huntsman Ales - Easter Four Day, Bournemouth
- 1966 - 1st in Croydon Premier Road Race, Surrey
- 1966 - 2nd in General Classification Streatham C.R.C. - Dover Two Day, Dover
- 1966 - 7th in Lincoln Grand Prix, Lincoln
