= Bob Apel =

British swimmer

Personal information
- Nationality: British (English)
- Born: 1945 Kettering, England

Sport
- Sport: Swimming
- Event: Breaststroke
- Club: Kettering ASC

Robert J. Apel (born 1945) is a former international swimmer from England who competed at the Commonwealth Games. He specialised in the breaststroke

== Biography ==
Apel from Kettering was a member of the Kettering Amateur Swimming Club. He won the inter-district 200 breaststroke title in February 1966 and represented Great Britain at international level.

Apel represented the England team at the 1966 British Empire and Commonwealth Games in Kingston, Jamaica, where he reached the finals of the 110 yards and 220 yards breaststroke events.
