= Darryl Jones (swimmer) =

British swimmer

Personal information
- Nationality: British (English)
- Born: c.1948 England

Sport
- Sport: Swimming
- Event(s): butterfly, breaststroke, medley
- Club: Southwark SC; Hampstead Ladies SC

Darryl L. Jones (born 1948) is a former international swimmer from England who competed at the Commonwealth Games.

== Biography ==
Jones was educated in Tottenham and swam for the Hampstead Ladies Swimming Club and was proficient in several strokes. She was capped by Great Britain as a sixteen-year-old. Jones initially swam for Southwark Swimming Club alongside fellow international Jimmy Rogers.

In 1965, Jones was Britain's leading medley swimmer.

Jones represented the England team at the 1966 British Empire and Commonwealth Games in Kingston, Jamaica, where she reached the finals of the 220 yards butterfly and the 440 yards individual medley events.
