= Judy Gegan =

British swimmer (born 1944)

Personal information
- Nationality: British (English)
- Born: 10 November 1944 (age 81) Romford, England
- Height: 160 cm (5 ft 3 in)
- Weight: 62 kg (137 lb)

Sport
- Sport: Swimming
- Strokes: Butterfly
- Club: Beckenham Ladies SC
Medal record
Swimming
Representing England
British Empire & Commonwealth Games
Gold medal – first place	1966 Kingston	440y medley relay
Silver medal – second place	1966 Kingston	110y butterfly

Judith "Judy" Anne Gegan married name Judy Wilson (born 10 November 1944) is a British former swimmer.

== Biography ==
Gegan competed in the women's 100 metre butterfly at the 1964 Summer Olympics.

Gegan represented the England team at the 1962 British Empire and Commonwealth Games in Perth, Western Australia. She competed in the 110 yards butterfly event.

Four years later she represented the England team again and won a gold medal and silver medal in the 440 yards medley relay and the 110 yards butterfly respectively, at the 1966 British Empire and Commonwealth Games in Kingston, Jamaica. The four of Gegan, Linda Ludgrove, Diana Harris and Pauline Sillett set a world record in winning the 4 x 110 yards medley relay, with a time of 4 mins, 46 secs.
