= Stella Mitchell =

British swimmer

Personal information
- Nationality: British (English)
- Born: 21 July 1947 (age 78) Hendon, London, England

Sport
- Sport: Swimming
- Strokes: Breaststroke
- Club: Heston Swimming Club
Medal record
Women's swimming
Representing England
British Empire and Commonwealth Games
Silver medal – second place	1966 Kingston	220 yd breaststroke

Stella Marian Minter Mitchell (born 21 July 1947) is a British former swimmer. Mitchell competed in two events at the 1964 Summer Olympics.

== Biography ==
Mitchell represented the England team at the 1966 British Empire and Commonwealth Games in Kingston, Jamaica, where she won a silver medal in the 220 yards breaststroke event.

At the ASA National British Championships she won the 220 yards breaststroke title four times in 1963, 1964, 1965 and 1966.
