= Keith Ross (swimmer) =

Welsh swimmer

Personal information
- Nationality: British (Welsh)

Sport
- Sport: swimming
- Event: freestyle
- Club: Ilford SC; Seven Kings SC

Keith Ross is a former swimmer from Wales, who competed at the 1966 British Empire and Commonwealth Games (now Commonwealth Games).

== Biography ==
Ross was a member of the Ilford Swimming Club and in April 1966, he captained Wales and broke the Welsh freestyle record with a time of 57 seconds, during an international match for Wales against Switzerland.

He represented the 1966 Welsh team at the 1966 British Empire and Commonwealth Games in Kingston, Jamaica, participating in the 110 yards freestyle event, the freestyle relay with Roddy Jones, Alun Lewis and Kevan Moran and the medley relay with Roddy Jones, Martyn Woodroffe and Hugh Jenkins.

Ross continued to swim for Wales after the Games and captained the Welsh team in the 1967 international against Ireland. He won both the 55 and 110 yards events and set a Welsh record over 55 yards, in July 1967 at the Welsh Championships. He was a member of the Seven Kings Swimming Club at the time.
