= Bob McStocker =

English sprinter

Personal information
- Nationality: British (English)
- Born: January 1947 (age 78) Ilford, London, England

Sport
- Sport: Athletics
- Event: Sprints
- Club: Ilford AC

Robert Ian "Bob" McStocker is a male former athlete who competed for England.

== Biography ==
McStocker was selected by England to represent his country in athletics events. He was a two times National university champion over 100 yards.

He represented the England team in the 100 yards, at the 1966 British Empire and Commonwealth Games in Kingston, Jamaica.

He was a member of the Ilford Athletics Club and was the 1966 Southern champion.

== Personal life ==
He was a teacher by trade.
