= Fiona Kellock =

British swimmer

Personal information
- Nationality: British (Scottish)
- Born: 26 October 1948 (age 77) Glasgow, Scotland
- Height: 168 cm (5 ft 6 in)
- Weight: 54 kg (119 lb)

Sport
- Sport: Swimming
- Strokes: Freestyle
- Club: Falkirk Otter ASC

Fiona Jean Kellock (born 26 October 1948) is a former swimmer from Scotland who competed in two events at the 1968 Summer Olympics.

== Biography ==
At the 1964 Olympic Games in Tokyo, Kellock participated in the 100 metres freestyle and the 4 × 100 metres freestyle relay events.

Kellock represented the Scotland team at the 1966 British Empire and Commonwealth Games in Kingston, Jamaica, where she participated in three events and finished fourth in the 4 x 110 yards medley relay, with Bobbie Robertson, Ann Baxter and Eleanor Stewart.
