= John Myles =

John Myles may refer to:

- John Myles (MP), English MP for Coventry from 1593 to 1597
- John Myles (minister) (c. 1621–1683), Colonial American founder of Swansea, Massachusetts
- John Myles (Australian politician) (1813–1893), politician in colonial Victoria, Australia

== See also ==
- John Miles (disambiguation)
- John Mylles (c. 1604–1676), English MP for Oxford University
- John Myles-Mills (born 1966), Ghanaian athlete
- Jonathan Myles-Lea (born 1969), English painter of historic houses
- Jonathan Myles (born 1982), American Olympic luger
