= Pauline Sillett =

British swimmer

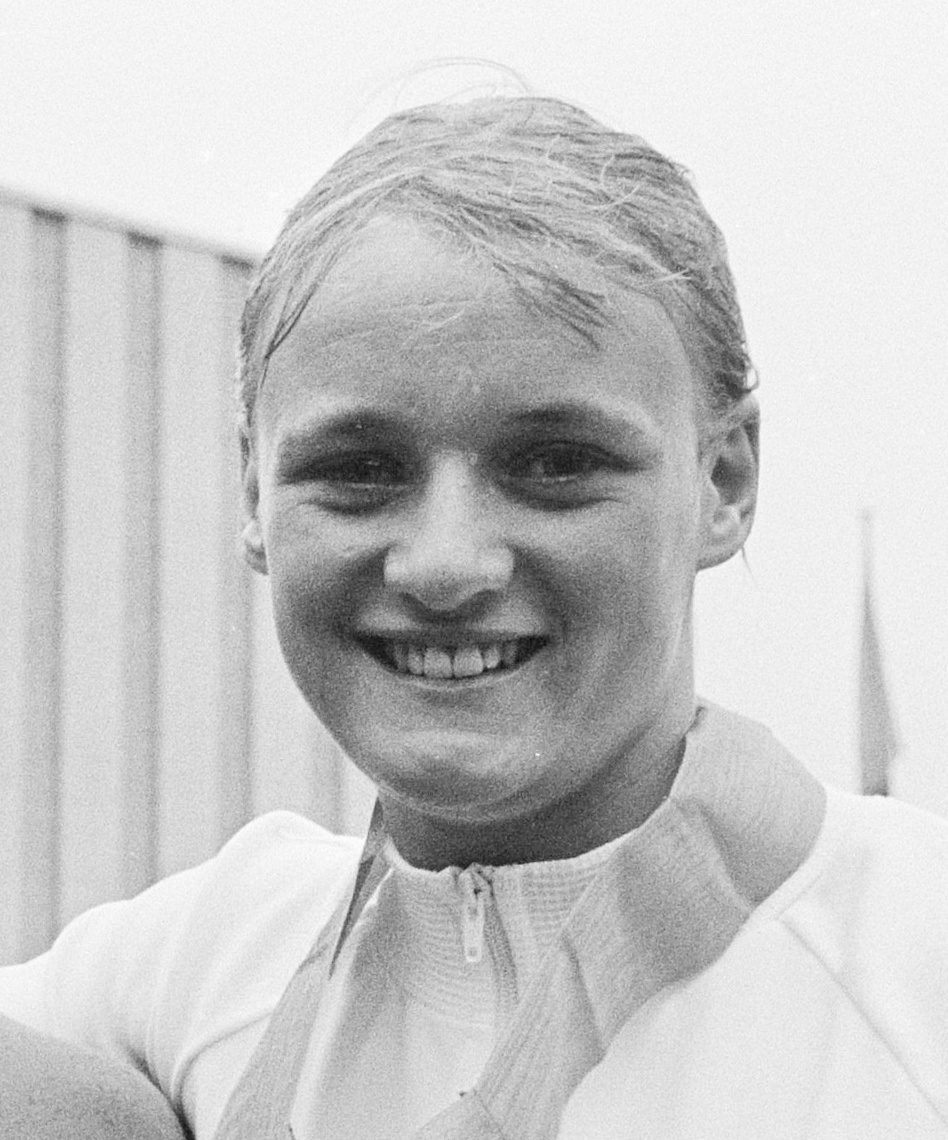
- Pauline Sillett in 1966

Personal information
- Born: 22 April 1949 (age 77) Bury, Greater Manchester, England
- Height: 160 cm (5 ft 3 in)
- Weight: 56 kg (123 lb)

Sport
- Sport: Swimming
- Strokes: Freestyle
- Club: Radcliffe Swimming and Water Polo Club
Medal record
Women's swimming
Representing Great Britain
European Championships
Bronze medal – third place	1966 Utrecht	100 m freestyle
Bronze medal – third place	1966 Utrecht	4×100 m medley
Representing England
British Empire and Commonwealth Games
Gold medal – first place	1966 Kingston	4×110 yd medley
Bronze medal – third place	1966 Kingston	4×110 yd freestyle

Pauline Sillett (born 22 April 1949) is a retired freestyle swimmer from England who competed at the 1964 Summer Olympics.

== Biography ==
At the 1964 Olympic Games in Tokyo, Sillett participated in the 400 metres freestyle and the 4 × 100 metres freestyle relay.

Sillett represented the England team at the 1966 British Empire and Commonwealth Games in Kingston, Jamaica, where she reached the finals of three swimming events and claimed two medals including gold. The gold medal-winning four of Sillett, Linda Ludgrove, Diana Harris and Judy Gegan set a world record in winning the 4 x 110 yards medley relay, with a time of 4 mins, 46 secs.

She also won two bronze medals at the 1966 European Aquatics Championships and won the 1966 British Championship in 100 metres freestyle.
