= Frances Cramp =

British diver

Personal information
- Nationality: British (English)
- Born: 27 June 1947 (age 79) Westminster, London, England
- Height: 165 cm (5 ft 5 in)
- Weight: 59 kg (130 lb)

Sport
- Sport: Diving
- Club: Isleworth Penguins SC

Frances Caroline Cramp (born 27 June 1947) is a female former diver who competed for Great Britain at the 1964 Summer Olympics and England in the Commonwealth Games.

== Biography ==
At the 1964 Olympic Games in Tokyo, she represented Great Britain in the 10 metres platform event.

Two years later she represented the England team at the 1966 British Empire and Commonwealth Games in Kingston, Jamaica, Jamaica. She competed in the 10 metres platform event.
