= Karl Byrom =

Australian swimmer

Personal information
- Born: 26 July 1951 (age 74) Sydney, Australia

Sport
- Sport: Swimming
- Strokes: Backstroke, individual medley
Medal record
Men's swimming
Representing Australia
British Empire and Commonwealth Games
Bronze medal – third place	1966 Kingston	220 yd backstroke

Karl Byrom (born 26 July 1951) is an Australian former swimmer. He competed in five events at the 1968 Summer Olympics.
