= John 'Smoaker' Miles =

English bather (1728–1797)

John 'Smoaker' Miles was a notable "bather" in Brighthelmstone (later called Brighton, England). The male occupation of "bather" and the female equivalent of "dipper" were popular in Georgian era in Britain where the custom of sea bathing grew in popularity.

John 'Smoaker' Miles was born in Brighthelmstone in 1728, the son of George and Sarah Miles. He rose to fame when he became the bather to the Prince of Wales, teaching him to swim and becoming his friend. The Prince of Wales who later became George IV commissioned John Russell to paint a portrait of Miles which is now part of the Royal Collection in Buckingham Palace. A copy of the portrait also hangs in the Kings Apartments at the Royal Pavilion in Brighton.

== Occupation ==
As a bather Miles would assist gentlemen and the dipper who would assist ladies from wooden covered bathing carts known as bathing machines, that would be pushed into the sea providing them privacy from onlookers on the beach. The bather or dipper would ensure the safety of the client in the sea. A popular song of the period was as follows:

There's plenty of dippers and jokers,
And salt water rigs for your fun;
The king of them all is old Smoaker,
The queen of 'em old Martha Gunn.

Miles's death in 1797 he was posthumously remembered in a play by M. Moritz called Phantoms or Apparitions of the Dead or Absent. The play also featured John Miles' sister in law Martha Gunn the notable Brighton dipper.

Miles is buried in St Nicholas' Church, Brighton.
