= Paul Nash (Jamaican swimmer) =

Jamaican swimmer (born 1943)

Personal information
- Born: July 10, 1943 (age 82) Kingston, Jamaica

Sport
- Sport: Swimming

Paul Nash (born 10 July 1943) is a Jamaican former swimmer who competed at the 1966 and 1970 Commonwealth Games as well as the 1968 Olympics. He has also represented his country at water-polo. He was named Jamaica Sportsperson of the year in 1969. He is the father of West Indian cricketer Brendan Nash.
