= Johnny Miles (footballer) =

Australian rules footballer

Personal information
- Full name: Johnny Miles
- Born: 23 August 1945 (age 81)
- Original team: Seddon
- Height: 173 cm (5 ft 8 in)
- Weight: 66 kg (146 lb)

Playing career^{1}
| Years | Club | Games (Goals) |
| 1964 | Footscray | 6 (0) |
- ^{1} Playing statistics correct to the end of 1964.

Johnny Miles (born 23 August 1945) is a former Australian rules footballer who played with Footscray in the Victorian Football League (VFL).
