= Linda Ludgrove =

English swimmer (born 1947)

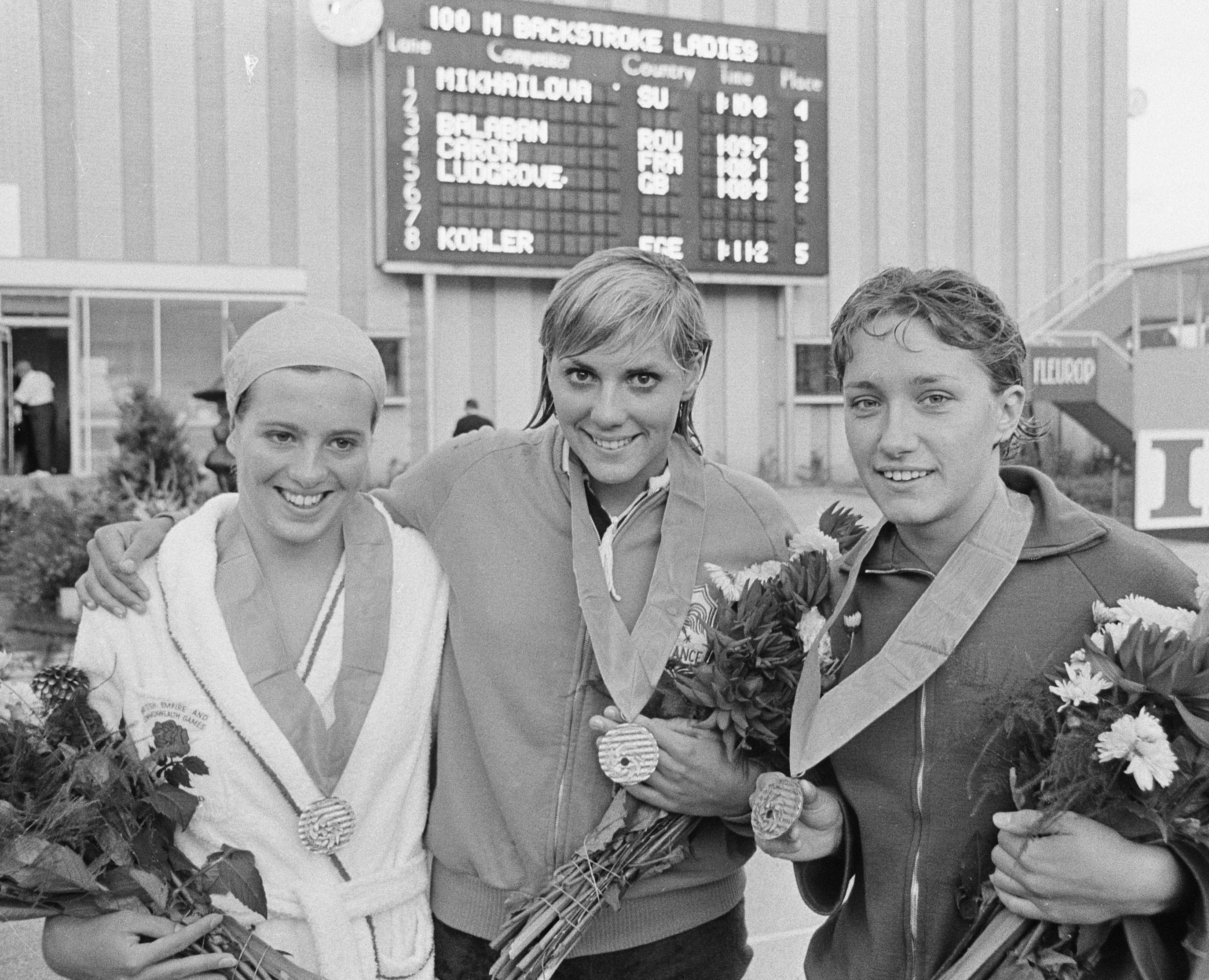
- European Championships 100 m backstroke 1966: Linda Ludgrove, Christine Caron, Cristina Balaban

Personal information
- Born: 8 September 1947 (age 78) Greenwich, London, England
- Height: 1.55 m (5 ft 1 in)
- Weight: 61 kg (134 lb)

Sport
- Sport: Swimming
- Club: Beckenham Ladies Swimming Club
Medal record
Representing Great Britain
European Championships
Silver medal – second place	1966 Utrecht	100 m backstroke
Bronze medal – third place	1962 Leipzig	4×100 m medley
Bronze medal – third place	1966 Utrecht	4×100 m medley
Representing England
British Empire and Commonwealth Games
Gold medal – first place	1962 Perth	110 yd backstroke
Gold medal – first place	1962 Perth	220 yd backstroke
Gold medal – first place	1966 Kingston	110 yd backstroke
Gold medal – first place	1966 Kingston	220 yd backstroke
Gold medal – first place	1966 Kingston	4×110 yd medley
Silver medal – second place	1962 Perth	4×110 yd medley

Linda Kay Ludgrove (born 8 September 1947) is a retired backstroke Swimmer from England. who held seven world records.

== Biography ==
Ludgrove was born to William and Gladys Ludgrove; she has a brother, Terence. Raised in Sydenham, Ludgrove won individual gold medals at 110 yards backstroke and 220 yards backstroke at the 1962 Commonwealth Games. As part of the English team she won silver in the 1962 4×110 yards medley relay. She finished third in the 1962 BBC Sports Personality of the Year.

She competed at the 1964 Summer Olympics in the 4×100 m medley relay and the 100 m backstroke and finished fifth and sixth, respectively. She won three medals at the 1962 and 1966 European Championships.

Ludgrove represented the England team at the 1966 British Empire and Commonwealth Games in Kingston, Jamaica, where she won three gold medals in the swimming events. At the Games, the four of Ludgrove, Diana Harris, Judy Gegan and Pauline Sillett set a world record in winning the 4 x 110 yards medley relay, with a time of 4 mins, 46 secs.

At the ASA National British Championships she won the 110 yards backstroke title five times (1962, 1963, 1964, 1966, 1967) and the 220 yards backstroke title three times (1964, 1966, 1967).

She retired from swimming in 1967. After marriage she changed her last name to Lillo.
