= Jill Slattery =

British swimmer (born 1945)

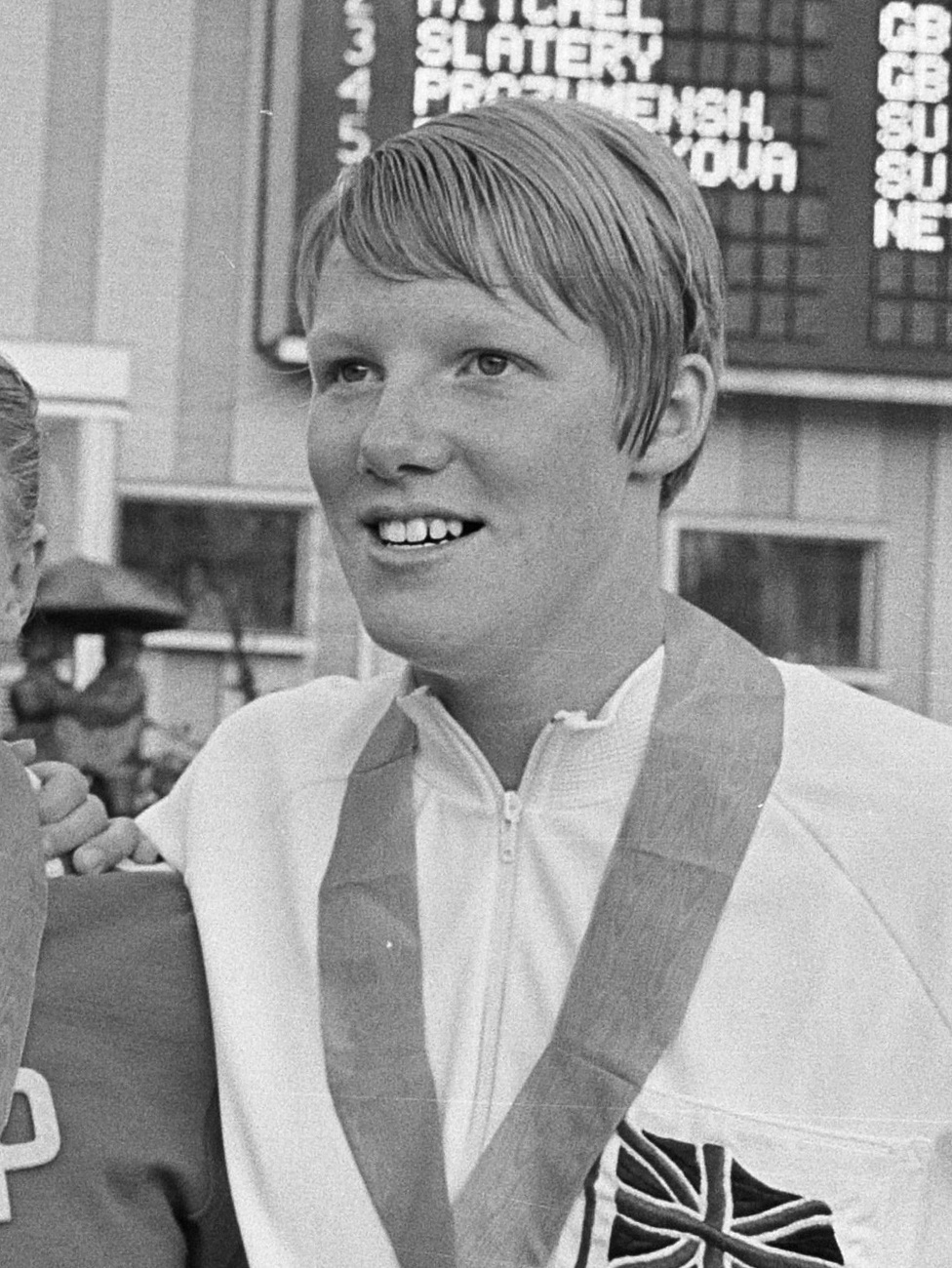
- Jill Slattery in 1966

Personal information
- Born: 25 May 1945 (age 81) Sheffield, England
- Height: 1.78 m (5 ft 10 in)
- Weight: 68 kg (150 lb)

Sport
- Sport: Swimming
- Event: Breaststroke
- Club: Attercliffe Swimming Club; Sheffield City Swimming Club
Medal record
Representing Great Britain
European Championships
Bronze medal – third place	1966 Utrecht	200 m breaststroke
Representing England
British Empire and Commonwealth Games
Gold medal – first place	1966 Kingston	220 yd breaststroke
Silver medal – second place	1966 Kingston	110 yd breaststroke

Gillian "Jill" Slattery (born 25 May 1945) is a female retired British Swimmer who competed at the 1964 and 1968 Summer Olympics.

== Biography ==
At the 1964 Olympic Games in Tokyo, Slattery participated in the 200 metres breaststroke.

Slattery won a bronze medal in the 200 metres breaststroke at the 1966 European Aquatics Championships. She represented the England team at the 1966 British Empire and Commonwealth Games in Kingston, Jamaica, where she reached the finals of both of the breaststroke events and won a gold and silver medal respectively.

A second Olympic appearance ensued at the 1968 Olympic Games in Mexico.

At the ASA National British Championships she won the 110 yards breaststroke title in 1964 and the 220 yards breaststroke title in 1967 and 1968.
