= David Gerrard =

New Zealand swimmer and sport administrator

Dave Gerrard CNZM OBE
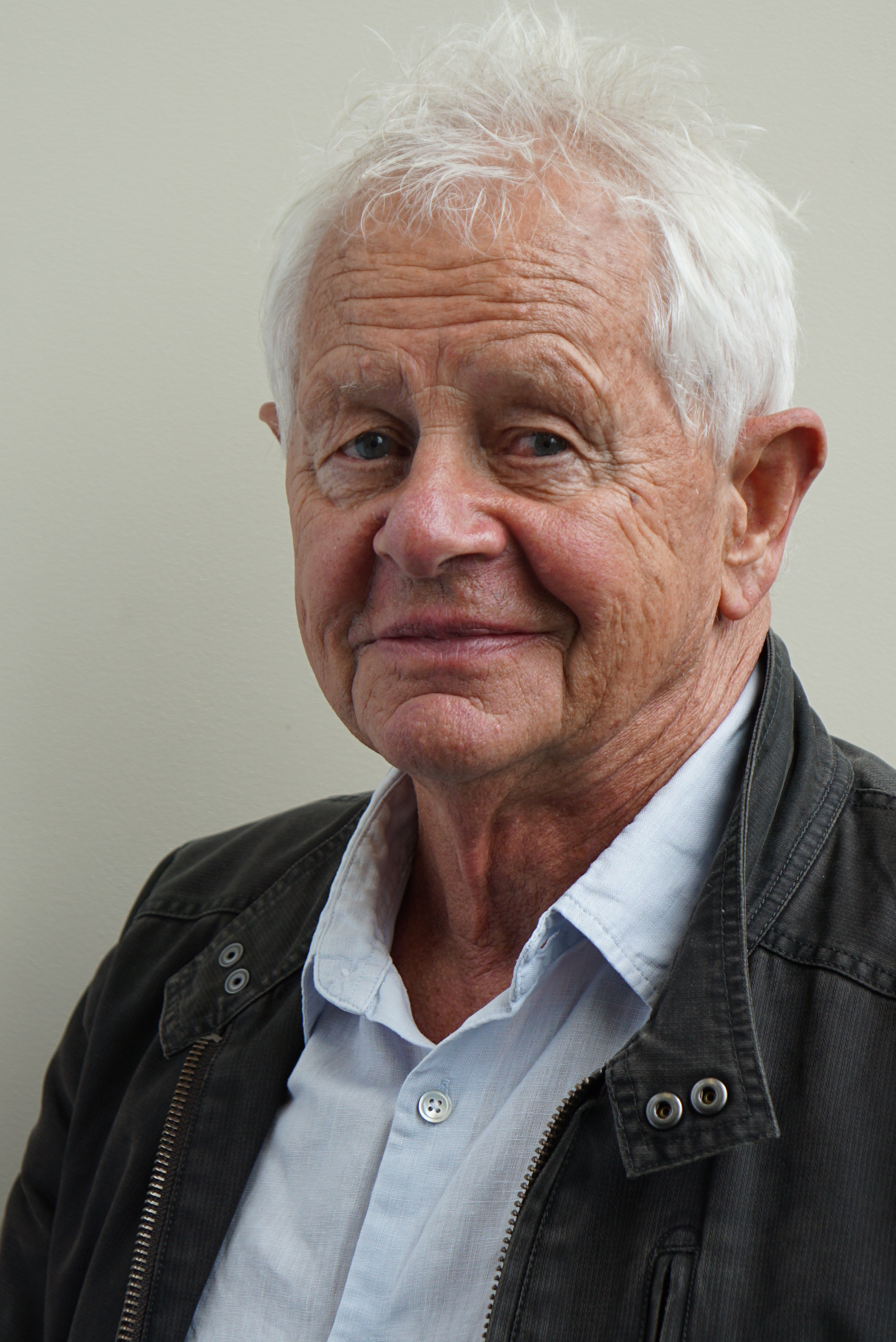
- Gerrard in 2025

Personal information
- Born: David Francis Gerrard; 3 April 1945 (age 81) Auckland, New Zealand
- Education: University of Otago
- Occupation: Professor of sports medicine
Medal record
Men's swimming
Representing New Zealand
British Empire and Commonwealth Games
Gold medal – first place	1966 Kingston	220y Butterfly
Bronze medal – third place	1966 Kingston	4×110y Medley relay

David Francis Gerrard CNZM OBE (born 3 April 1945 in Auckland) is a sports administrator, sports medicine specialist, and former Olympic Games swimming representative from New Zealand.

== Swimming career ==
As a competitive swimmer, Gerrard was a specialist in the butterfly stroke winning the national 110 yards title from 1962 to 1968 (excluding 1964) and the 220 yards title for ten consecutive years from 1960 to 1969.

As a representative at the Olympic Games Gerrard competed at the 1964 Summer Olympics, reaching the semi-finals of the 200 metres butterfly. He also represented New Zealand twice at the British Empire and Commonwealth Games. At the 1962 Games in Perth, Western Australia, he reached the finals in both the 110 yards and 220 yards butterfly but did not medal. In 1966 Games in Kingston, Jamaica, he won Gold in the 220 yards butterfly and Bronze as part of the New Zealand 4×110 yards medley relay team. He also reached the final of the 110 yards butterfly.

== Medical career ==
After his retirement from competition, Gerrard gained a medical degree (MB ChB) at the University of Otago in 1977 and has specialised in the field of sports medicine, mainly based in Dunedin at the University of Otago. Over the years he has strongly participated in teaching and research in sports medicine, lipids and diabetes.

He joined the University of Otago in 1981 and in 2007 Gerrard had become the Associate Dean of the School of Medicine and Associate Professor of Sports Medicine at the University of Otago Dunedin School of Medicine. In the 2007 Queen’s Birthday Honours, he was appointed a Companion of the New Zealand Order of Merit, for services to sports medicine.

In 2014, Gerrard was promoted to professor at the University of Otago Dunedin School of Medicine, and in 2016 was granted the title Emeritus Professor.

== Sports administrator ==
Gerrard served as an official at the following Olympic and Commonwealth Games:

- 1974 Commonwealth Games: Swimming Manager
- 1982 Commonwealth Games: Team Doctor
- 1984 Summer Olympics: Team Doctor
- 1986 Commonwealth Games: Team Doctor
- 1988 Summer Olympics: Health Team Leader
- 1994 Commonwealth Games: Chef de Mission
- 1996 Summer Olympics: Chef de Mission

In the 1995 New Year Honours, Gerrard was appointed an Officer of the Order of the British Empire, for services to sports medicine and sport. He was chair of Drug Free Sport New Zealand from 2003 to 2010. He was one of the inaugural NZ Fellows of the Australasian College of Sport and Exercise Physicians.

He was on the committee of the International Swimming Federation's Sports Medicine Committee for 30 years and has chaired the Therapeutic Use Exemptions committee of the World Anti-Doping Agency since 2013. He is currently working to develop a test to detect use of synthetic Erythropoietin, a drug frequently used in Blood doping.

== See also ==
- List of Commonwealth Games medallists in swimming (men)
