= Graham Dunn =

Australian swimmer

Personal information
- Full name: Graham John Jennings Dunn
- Born: 11 March 1950 Sydney, Australia
- Died: 12 October 1973 (aged 23) Balmain, New South Wales

Sport
- Sport: Swimming
- Strokes: Butterfly
Medal record
British Empire Games
Silver medal – second place	1966 Kingston	Men's 110 yd Butterfly

Graham Dunn (11 March 1950 – 12 October 1973) was an Australian swimmer. He competed in two events at the 1968 Summer Olympics.

He died at age 23 from morphine poisoning after becoming addicted to drugs.
