= Robyn Bradshaw =

Australian diver (born 1947)

Personal information
- Born: Robyn Jean Bradshaw; 6 May 1947 Perth, Western Australia
- Height: 1.58 m (5 ft 2 in)

Sport
- Country: Australia
- Event(s): 3m springboard, 10m platform
Medal record
Representing Australia
Women's Diving
British Empire and Commonwealth Games
Silver medal – second place	1966 Kingston	10m platform

Robyn Jean Bradshaw (born 6 May 1947) is a former Australian diver who competed in two Olympic Games and one Commonwealth Games.

Bradshaw, then aged 16 years and 45 days, was the youngest diver to participate at the 1964 Tokyo Olympics. She finished ninth in the 10m platform and 13th in the 3m springboard.

Bradshaw won the silver medal at 1966 Commonwealth Games in Kingston, Jamaica in 10m platform, missing out on the gold medal by 2/100 of a point to Joy Newman. She finished fifth in the 3m springboard.

At the 1968 Mexico Olympics Bradshaw finished 15th in the 3m springboard and 18th in the 10m platform.

== Personal ==
Bradshaw's married name is Arlow. She is the mother of Vyninka Arlow, also a competitive diver.

Bradshaw went on to become a primary school teacher for 30 years, and have three children and three grandchildren.

She returned to the Olympics in 2000, working as the Technical Operations Manager in Diving for the Sydney Olympics.
