= Jane Hughes (swimmer) =

Canadian swimmer (born 1948)

Personal information
- Full name: Jane Marrian Hughes
- Nationality: Canadian
- Born: 30 June 1948 (age 77) Vancouver, British Columbia
- Spouse: Alfred Douglas Rogers (m.1964)
- Children: 4

Sport
- Sport: Swimming
- Event(s): 400, 800 meter freestyle 880-yd freestyle WR
- Strokes: Freestyle; Individual Medley
- Club: Vancouver Canadian Dolphins
- Coach: Howard Firby (Dolphins)
Medal record
Women's swimming
Representing Canada
British Empire and Commonwealth Games
| Gold medal – first place | 1966 Kingston | 4×110 yd freestyle |
| Bronze medal – third place | 1966 Kingston | 440 yd medley |

Jane Marrian Hughes (born June 30, 1948) is a Canadian former swimmer and world record holder who competed for the Vancouver Canadian Dolphins Swim Club and represented Canada in two swimming events at the 1964 Tokyo Olympics. In 1964, she set a world record in the 880 yard freestyle distance, becoming only the third Canadian swimmer to set a world record recognized by the World Swimming Federation.

== Early life ==
Hughes was born June 30, 1948, in Vancouver, British Columbia. She attended Point Grey Secondary School, and by 14 swam for the Canadian Dolphin Swim Club, coached by Hall of Fame Coach Howard Firby. Firby founded the Canadian Dolphins with Canadian Olympic medalist Mary Stewart's father William in 1955, and coached the highly competitive program from 1955 to 1967, winning six successive Canadian Team national championships during his coaching tenure, with the exception of the year 1965. The National championships included several of Hughes's years with the Dolphin Club. Skilled in the study of anatomy and aerodynamics, Harold Firby made an involved study of the freestyle stroke, attempting to improve his swimmers's positioning and technique, and passed his knowledge to Hughes. He was also particularly skilled in coaching non-freestyle strokes, which contributed to Hughes' success competing in the Individual Medley where she held a 400-meter Canadian record.

== World and Canadian records ==
Hughes distinguished herself in her youth by setting a new world record in the 880-yard freestyle in 1964 with a time of 9:57.1. She broke the former mark finishing 14.3 seconds ahead of the standing six year record of 10:11.4 set by Ilsa Konrads of Australia in 1959.

She broke the World record in the 1650-yard freestyle with a time of on July 9, 1965, with a time of 19:19.8 at the Northwest AAU Championships in Tacoma.

Swimming in a time trial at the Hollyburn Country Club in preparation for the 1964 Canadian Olympic trials, Hughes set a Canadian 800-meter record with a time of 10:04.5, the third fastest in the world that year. She was the first Canadian woman to swim the 400 meter freestyle in a time under 5 minutes, with a 4:56.7. She set a Canadian record time of 5:34.3 in the women's 400-metre Individual Medley at the Hollyburn Country Club Senior Invitational Meet on February 26, 1966, helping her Dolphins team to win the meet.

Hughes was a member of the Canadian national team from 1964 to 1967. At the 1966 British Empire/Commonwealth games in Kingston, she won a gold medal in the 4×110 yards freestyle, and a bronze in the 440 yard medley.

As part of the Canadian team on February 21, 1967, she competed in a meet in Durban, South Africa, scoring the most meet points by taking three firsts with times of 1:13.8 in the 110-yard butterfly, 2:21.3 in the 220-yard freestyle, and 2:42.3 in the 220-yard Individual Medley.

== Marriage ==
She married 1964 Olympic silver medalist in Judo, Doug Rogers, a future British Columbia and Canadian Sports Hall of Fame honoree. Rogers was the son of Dr. Allison Rogers, who officiated the couple's wedding ceremony held at 2:00 pm on July 11, 1970, at the University of British Columbia Union College Chapel. Jane was predeceased by her husband Doug who died at 79 in 2020. They would have four children during their marriage of 50 years.

== 1964 Tokyo Olympics ==
Suffering from a case of the flu at the August, 1964 Canadian trials, her best time of 4:55.6 in the event qualified her to swim the 400 metre freestyle, though the standing world record was 4:44. A longer distance event, such as the 800 meter freestyle would have greatly improved her chances of a medal, but the distance was not then part of Olympic competition in swimming.

She competed in the women's 400 metre freestyle at the October, 1964 Summer Olympics, making the finals and placing 5th with a time of 4:50.9, breaking her previous Canadian record in the event. She previously swam a 4:54.8, placing third in the fourth preliminary heat to qualify for the finals.
