= Norma Thomas =

British diver

Personal information
- Nationality: British
- Born: 13 June 1940 (age 85) Winsford, Cheshire, England

Sport
- Sport: Diving

Norma Thomas (born 13 June 1940) is a British diver. She competed in the women's 10 metre platform event at the 1960 Summer Olympics.
