= Kathy Rowlatt =

British diver

Personal information
- Nationality: British (English)
- Born: 4 May 1948 (age 78) Leyton, Greater London, England
- Height: 152 cm (5 ft 0 in)
- Weight: 52 kg (115 lb)

Sport
- Sport: Diving
- Event: Springboard
- Club: Leyton Swimming Club
Medal record
Diving
Representing England
British Empire & Commonwealth Games
Gold medal – first place	1966 Kingston	3m springboard

Kathleen R. Rowlatt (born 14 May 1948) is a British former diver who competed at the 1968 Summer Olympics..

== Biography ==
Rowlatt was a member of the Leyton Swimming Club and represented the England team at the 1966 British Empire and Commonwealth Games in Kingston, Jamaica. She competed in the springboard event, winning a gold medal.

At the 1968 Olympic Games in Mexico City, she participated in the 3 metres springboard event.
