= Malcolm Tucker (swimmer) =

British former international swimmer (born 1947)

Personal information
- Nationality: British (English)
- Born: 1947 (age 78–79) Greater London, England

Sport
- Sport: Swimming
- Event: Breaststroke
- Club: Southall SC
Medal record
Swimming
Representing England
British Empire & Commonwealth Games
Silver medal – second place	1966 Kingston	440y medley
Bronze medal – third place	1966 Kingston	110y breaststroke

Malcolm J. Tucker (born 1947) is a British former international swimmer.

== Biography ==
Tucker was educated at Millfield School from 1961 to 1965.

Tucker represented the England team at the 1966 British Empire and Commonwealth Games in Kingston, Jamaica, where he won a silver medal in the 440 yards medley and a bronze medal in the 110 yards breaststroke, He also reached the final of the 220 yards breaststroke event.

He swam for the Southall Club.
