= Diana Harris =

English swimmer (born 1948)

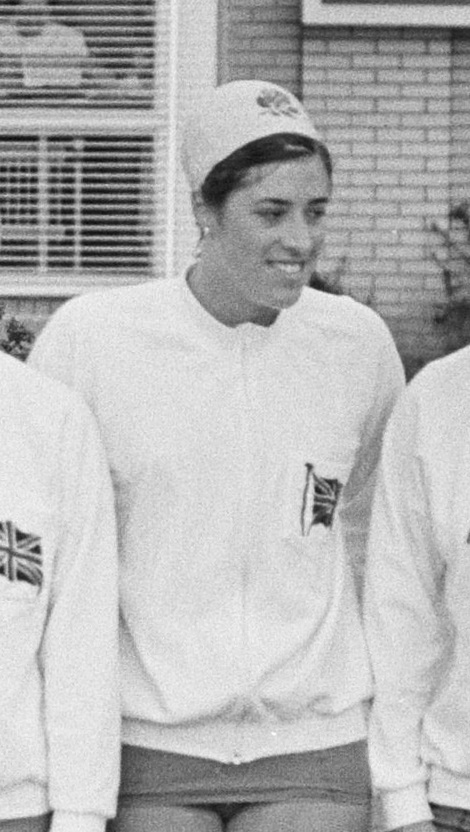
- Harris in 1966

Personal information
- Full name: Diana Adrienne Harris
- National team: Great Britain
- Born: 14 August 1948 (age 78) London, England
- Height: 1.72 m (5 ft 8 in)
- Weight: 66 kg (146 lb; 10.4 st)

Sport
- Sport: Swimming
- Strokes: Breaststroke
- Club: Beckenham Ladies SC
Medal record
Women's swimming
Representing Great Britain
European Championships
Bronze medal – third place	1966 Utrecht	4×100 m medley
Summer Universiade
Gold medal – first place	1967 Tokyo	100 m breaststroke
Silver medal – second place	1967 Tokyo	200 m breaststroke
Silver medal – second place	1967 Tokyo	4×100 m medley
Commonwealth Games
Gold medal – first place	1966 Kingston	110 yd breaststroke
Gold medal – first place	1966 Kingston	4×110 yd medley

Diana Adrienne Harris (born 14 August 1948), also known by her married name Diana Mantoura, is a retired English international swimmer.

== Swimming career ==
She represented Great Britain in the Olympic Games and European championships, and swam for England in the Commonwealth Games. She won a bronze medal in the 4×100-metre medley relay at the 1966 European Aquatics Championships. She competed in breaststroke events at the 1968 and 1972 Summer Olympics, but failed to reach the finals.

She represented the England team at the 1966 British Empire and Commonwealth Games in Kingston, Jamaica and won double gold in the 110 yards breaststroke and the 440 yards medley relay. The four of Harris, Linda Ludgrove, Judy Gegan and Pauline Sillett set a world record in winning the 4 x 110 yards medley relay, with a time of 4 mins, 46 secs.

A second Commonwealth Games appearance came when she represented England in the breaststroke events, at the 1970 British Commonwealth Games in Edinburgh, Scotland.

She won the 100-metre breaststroke event at the 1967 Summer Universiade. At the ASA National British Championships she won the 110 yards breaststroke title in 1965, 1966 and 1968.
