= Robert Hassell (sport shooter) =

British sports shooter (1929-2004)

Personal information
- Born: 24 February 1929 London, England
- Died: June 2004 (aged 75) Kingston-upon-Thames, England

Sport
- Sport: Sports shooting

Robert Hassell (24 February 1929 – June 2004) was a British sports shooter. He competed at the 1960 Summer Olympics and the 1968 Summer Olympics.
