= Mandi Haswell =

British diver (born 1949)

Personal information
- Nationality: British (Welsh)
- Born: 1 October 1949 (age 76) Penarth, Wales
- Height: 153 cm (5 ft 0 in)
- Weight: 50 kg (110 lb)

Sport
- Sport: Diving
- Events: Platform, Springboard
- Club: Cardiff Swimming Club

Madeleine Margaret Haswell (born 1 October 1949) is a former diver from Wales who competed at the 1968 Summer Olympics.

== Biography ==
Haswell represented the 1966 Welsh team at the 1966 British Empire and Commonwealth Games in Kingston, Jamaica, participating in the platform and springboard events.

At the 1968 Olympic Games in Mexico City, Haswell competed in the women's 10 metre platform event.
