= Susan Williams (swimmer) =

British swimmer (born 1952)

Personal information
- Nationality: British (English)
- Born: 18 March 1952 (age 74) Exeter, England
- Height: 168 cm (5 ft 6 in)
- Weight: 61 kg (134 lb)

Sport
- Sport: Swimming
- Strokes: freestyle
- Club: Exeter Swimming Club

Susan Elizabeth Williams married name Haigh (born 18 March 1952) is a former international swimmer from England who competed in four events at the 1968 Summer Olympics.

== Biography ==
Williams represented the England team in the freestyle and medley events, at the 1966 British Empire and Commonwealth Games in Kingston, Jamaica. She reached the finals of the 440 yards freestyle and medley events.

Four years later she represented England in the butterfly and freestyle events, at the 1970 British Commonwealth Games in Edinburgh, Scotland.

She won the 1967 ASA National British Championships over 200 metres freestyle, was the 400 metres freestyle champion in 1967 and 1969 and won the 800 metres freestyle in 1967 and 1969. She also won the 440 yards medley in 1966.
