= Christine Kindon =

English swimmer

Personal information
- Nationality: British (English)
- Born: Fourth quarter 1949 West Hartlepool, England

Sport
- Sport: Swimming
- Event: Backstroke
- Club: West Hartlepool Swimming Club

Christine Kindon married name Christine Brown (born October 1949), is a female retired swimmer who competed for England.

== Biography ==
Kindon was ranked the number one backstroke swimmer in Northumberland and Durham during the early part of 1966 which led to her becoming a full international after being selected for the England team.

She represented the England team in the backstroke events, at the 1966 British Empire and Commonwealth Games in Kingston, Jamaica.

She was a member of the Hartlepool Swimming Club. Kindon married in 1970 and swam under her married name of Brown thereafter.
