= Keith Bewley =

English swimmer

Personal information
- Nationality: British (English)
- Born: Third quarter 1947 Liverpool, England
- Died: 16 January 2017 (aged 69)

Sport
- Sport: Swimming
- Club: Bootle SC
Medal record
Swimming
Representing England
British Empire & Commonwealth Games
Silver medal – second place	1966 Kingston	440y medley Relay
Bronze medal – third place	1966 Kingston	880y freestyle Relay
Bronze medal – third place	1966 Kingston	110y butterfly

Keith Bewley (1947 – 16 January 2017), was a male swimmer who competed for England and a leading swimming coach.

== Swimming career ==
Bewley was a member of the Bootle Swimming Club.

He represented the England team and won a silver medal and two bronze medals in the medley, freestyle and butterfly events, at the 1966 British Empire and Commonwealth Games in Kingston, Jamaica.

== Coaching ==
He coached the Northern Ireland national squad and from the Wigan Wasps Club he coached Margaret Kelly, Gaynor Stanley, June Croft, Ann Osgerby, Janet Osgerby and Steve Poulter.
