= Paddy O'Carroll (swimmer) =

New Zealand swimmer

Medal record

Men's swimming

Representing New Zealand

British Empire and Commonwealth Games
Bronze medal – third place	1966 Kingston	440 yards Medley Relay

Paddy O'Carroll is a former competition swimmer from New Zealand.

At the 1966 British Empire and Commonwealth Games he won the bronze medal in the men's 440 yards medley relay. He also competed individually in the men's 100 and 220 yards backstroke, finishing 4th and 6th in each final respectively. Additionally O'Carroll swam in the 110 yards freestyle event.

== See also ==
- List of Commonwealth Games medallists in swimming (men)
