= Neil Jackson (swimmer) =

British swimmer

Personal information
- Nationality: British (English)
- Born: 6 March 1946 (age 80) Southport, England
- Height: 193 cm (6 ft 4 in)
- Weight: 80 kg (176 lb)

Sport
- Sport: Swimming
- Strokes: backstroke, butterfly
- Club: Southport SC
Medal record
Swimming
Representing England
British Empire & Commonwealth Games
| Silver medal – second place | 1966 Kingston | 440y medley |
| Bronze medal – third place | 1966 Kingston | 220y backstroke |

Joseph Neil Jackson (born 6 March 1946) is a British former international swimmer who competed at the 1968 Summer Olympics.

== Biography ==
Jackson represented the England team and won a silver medal in the 440 yards medley and a bronze medal in the 220 yards backstroke, at the 1966 British Empire and Commonwealth Games in Kingston, Jamaica.

At the 1968 Olympic Games in Mexico, Jackson competed in three events; the 100 metres backstroke, the 100 metres butterfly and the medley relay.
