= Joy Newman =

British diver (born 1945)

Personal information
- Nationality: British (English)
- Born: 17 November 1945 (age 80) Edmonton, London, England
- Height: 162 cm (5 ft 4 in)
- Weight: 52 kg (115 lb)

Sport
- Sport: Diving
- Event: Platform
- Club: Islander Ladies DC
Medal record
Women's diving
Representing Great Britain
Universiade
Gold medal – first place	1965 Budapest	Platform
Representing England
British Empire & Commonwealth Games
Gold medal – first place	1966 Kingston	10m platform

Joy Ernestine Newman (born 17 November 1945) is a British former diver who competed at the 1964 Summer Olympics..

== Biography ==
Newman represented the England team at the 1962 British Empire and Commonwealth Games in Perth, Australia. She competed in the 10 metres platformy event.

At the 1964 Olympic Games in Tokyo, she participated in the platform event.

Two years later she returned to compete in the Commonwealth Games and this time won the gold medal at the 1966 British Empire and Commonwealth Games in Kingston, Jamaica.
