= Tony Graham (swimmer) =

New Zealand swimmer

Medal record

Men's swimming

Representing New Zealand

British Empire and Commonwealth Games
Silver medal – second place	1966 Kingston	110 yd breaststroke
Silver medal – second place	1966 Kingston	220 yd breaststroke
Bronze medal – third place	1966 Kingston	440 yd medley relay

Tony Graham is a former competitive swimmer from New Zealand.

At the 1966 British Empire and Commonwealth Games in Kingston, Jamaica, he won two silver medals for his second-place finishes in the men's breaststroke swimming events: the first in the men's 110-yard breaststroke, and the second in the 220-yard breaststroke. In addition he won a bronze medal competing as a member of New Zealand's third-place team in the men's 440-yard medley relay.

== See also ==
- List of Commonwealth Games medallists in swimming (men)
