= John Palin (sport shooter) =

British sports shooter (1934–2025)

Personal information
- Full name: John Charlton Palin
- Born: 16 July 1934 Madras, Tamil Nadu, India
- Died: 29 December 2025 (aged 91)

Sport
- Sport: Sports shooting

John Charlton Palin (16 July 1934 – 29 December 2025) was a British sports shooter. He competed at the 1968 Summer Olympics and the 1972 Summer Olympics. Palin died on 29 December 2025, at the age of 91.
