= Sally Davison =

British swimmer

Personal information
- Born: 1 December 1950 (age 75) London, England

Sport
- Sport: Swimming

Sally Davison (born 1 December 1950) is a British former swimmer. Davison competed in two events at the 1968 Summer Olympics. She won the 1968 British Championship in the 400 metres freestyle and won the 1968 800 metres freestyle title.
