= David Priestley =

British diver

Personal information
- Nationality: British
- Born: 9 February 1946 (age 79) Blackpool, England
- Height: 170 cm (5 ft 7 in)
- Weight: 67 kg (148 lb)

Sport
- Sport: Diving
- Club: City of Cardiff

David Priestley also spelt Priestly (born 9 February 1946) is a British former diver who competed at the 1968 Summer Olympics.

== Biography ==
Priestley was a member of the City of Cardiff club.

Priestley represented the 1966 Welsh team at the 1966 British Empire and Commonwealth Games in Kingston, Jamaica, participating in the springboard and platform events.

At the 1968 Olympic Games in Mexico City he participated in the men's 10 metre platform event.
