= Ann Baxter (swimmer) =

Scottish swimmer

Personal information
- Nationality: British (Scotland)
- Born: c.1947

Sport
- Sport: Swimming
- Event: Breaststroke
- Club: Dunfermline Carnegie SC

Elizabeth Ann Baxter (born c.1947) is a former swimmer from Scotland, who represented Scotland at the British Empire Games (now Commonwealth Games).

== Biography ==
Baxter, born in 1947, came to prominence in September 1962, after breaking the British records for the 100 and 110 yards breaststroke. She was a member of the Dunfermline Carnegie Swimming Club and subsequently was called up to represent Scotland at international level.

She represented the 1962 Scottish Team at the 1962 British Empire and Commonwealth Games in Perth, Australia, participating in the breaststroke events and reaching the final of 110 yards breaststroke event.

Baxter was a multiple Scottish champion and British record holder and her father was bank manager and official for the Scottish Swimming Association. She went to her second Commonwealth Games at the 1966 British Empire and Commonwealth Games in Jamaica.
