= Roddy Jones =

British swimmer

Personal information
- Nationality: British (Welsh)
- Born: 2 December 1944 (age 81) Newport, Wales, Great Britain
- Height: 193 cm (6 ft 4 in)
- Weight: 83 kg (183 lb)

Sport
- Sport: Swimming
- Strokes: Backstroke
- Club: Newport Swimming Club
Medal record
Representing Great Britain
Summer Universiade
Bronze medal – third place	1967 Tokyo	100m backstroke

Roderick Stephen Gerrard Jones known as Roddy Jones (born 2 December 1944) is a former swimmer from Wales, who competed at the 1968 Summer Olympics.

== Biography ==
Jones represented the 1962 Welsh team at the 1962 British Empire and Commonwealth Games in Perth, Australia, where he participated in the 110 and 220 yards backstroke events. Four years later in 1966, he went to his second Commonwealth Games in Kingston, Jamaica, competing for the 1966 Welsh team in the backstroke events.

At the 1968 Olympic Games in Mexico City, Jones competed in the men's 100 metre backstroke.

At the ASA National British Championships he won the 110 yards backstroke title three times (1966, 1967, 1968) and the 220 yards backstroke title in 1965.
