= Tony Jarvis =

English swimmer (born 1946)

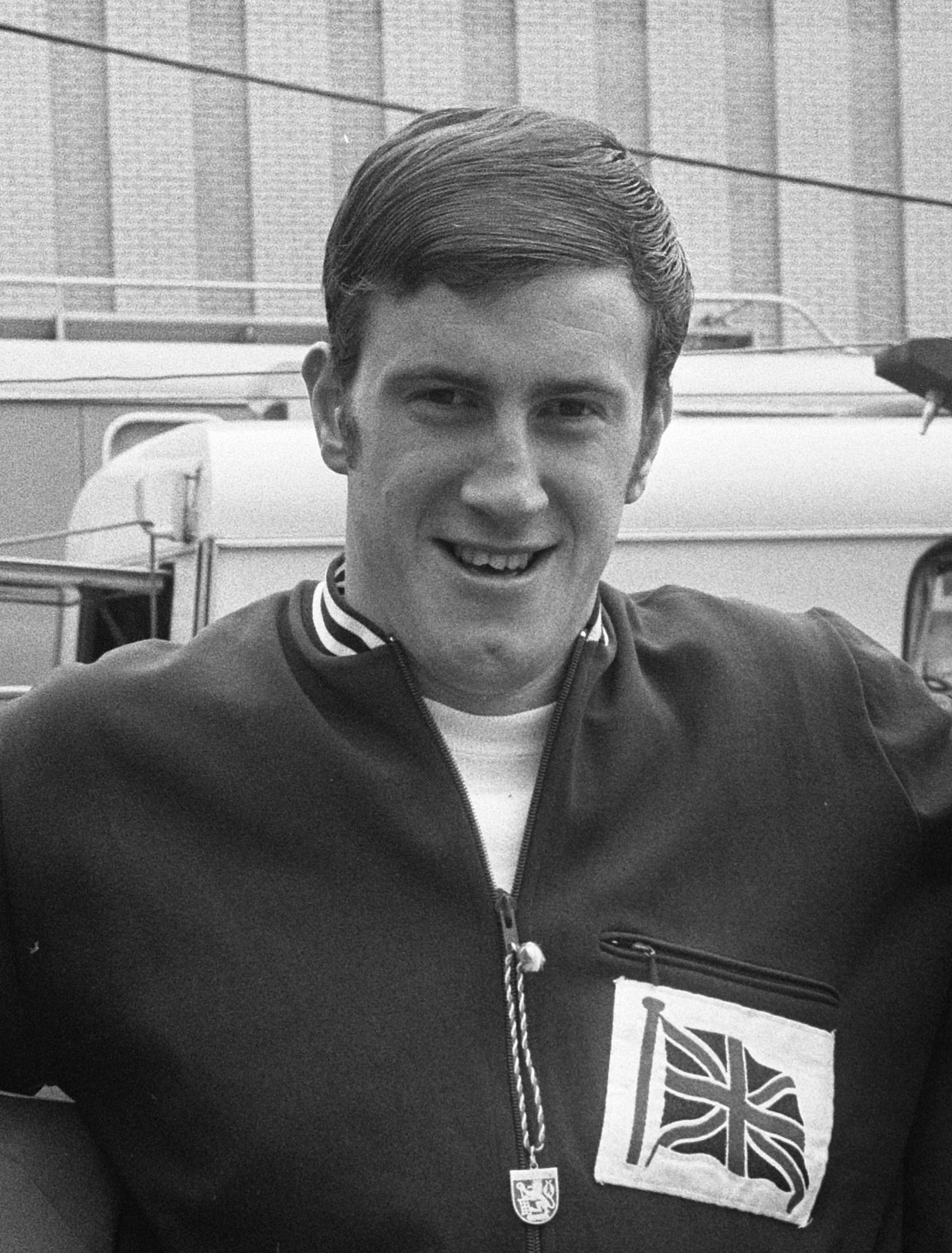
- Jarvis in 1969

Personal information
- National team: Great Britain
- Born: 3 March 1945 (age 81) Bournemouth, England
- Height: 1.91 m (6 ft 3 in)
- Weight: 76 kg (168 lb; 12.0 st)

Sport
- Sport: Swimming
- Strokes: Freestyle
- Club: Otter Swimming Club
Medal record
Men's swimming
Representing Great Britain
Universiade
| Bronze medal – third place | 1967 Tokyo | 400 m freestyle |
Representing England
Commonwealth Games
| Bronze medal – third place | 1966 Kingston | 4×110 yd freestyle |
| Bronze medal – third place | 1966 Kingston | 4×220 yd freestyle |
| Bronze medal – third place | 1970 Edinburgh | 4×100 m freestyle |
| Bronze medal – third place | 1970 Edinburgh | 4×200 m freestyle |

Anthony Andrew "Tony" Jarvis (born 3 March 1946) is a retired English international swimmer who represented Great Britain in the Olympics and World University Games, and England in the Commonwealth Games.

== Swimming career ==
He competed at the 1968 Summer Olympics in four freestyle events and finished fourth in the 4×100-metre freestyle relay. He won double silver and a bronze medal in the World Student Games in Tokyo 1967 plus double bronze in Turin 1970.

He represented England and won two bronze medals in the freestyle relay events, at the 1966 British Empire and Commonwealth Games in Kingston, Jamaica. Four years later a second Commonwealth Games appearance came when he represented England and once again won double bronze in the freestyle relay events, at the 1970 British Commonwealth Games in Edinburgh, Scotland.

He is a two times winner of the British Championship in the 200 metres freestyle (1967 and 1968) and the 400 metres freestyle in 1968.

He subsequently held world records in Masters Swimming as well as world titles in the World Masters Championships.

== Personal life ==
He graduated from the London University and in 1972 received a Master of Business Administration degree from the University of Massachusetts. Between 1981 and 1998 he ran his international advertising and marketing company Jarvis, Sherman & Jarvis in Toronto, Canada, simultaneously acting as chairman (1990–92) and board member (1984–98) of the Canadian Advertising Research Foundation. He then joined the international research provider Millward Brown, where he served as vice president of media services between 1998 and 1999. After that he was senior vice president, director of strategic information at CTN Media Group, and senior vice president of Infinity Broadcasting Corporation (CBS Radio). In 2006 he became executive vice president of global research at Clear Channel Outdoor Holdings Inc. Tony has been the proprietor and research architect at his company, Olympic Media Consultancy since 2010.

== See also ==
- List of Commonwealth Games medallists in swimming (men)
