= Cycling at the 1962 British Empire and Commonwealth Games – Men's road race =

Cycling Road – Men's road race at the 1962 British Empire and Commonwealth Games
- Venue: Kings Park, Perth, Western Australia
- Dates: 1962

Medalists
gold medal	Wes Mason	England
silver medal	Anthony Walsh	New Zealand
bronze medal	Laurie Byers	New Zealand

The men's road race at the 1962 British Empire and Commonwealth Games, was part of the cycling programme, which took place in 1962.

The road race consisted of 40 laps of a 3-mile circuit of Kings Park, Western Australia, although Pathé News states 117 miles.

Wes Mason won the gold medal.

== Results ==
Rank	Rider	Time
1st place, gold medalist(s)	Wes Mason (ENG)	5:20:26.2
2nd place, silver medalist(s)	Anthony Walsh (NZL)	5:20:27.0
3rd place, bronze medalist(s)	Laurie Byers (NZL)	5:20:27.2
4	Frank Brazier (AUS)	5:20:27.7
5	Jack Johnston (NIR)	
6	Ron Killey (IOM)	
7	M. Gagne (CAN)	
8	Thomas Delaney (AUS)	
9	Dick Johnstone (NZL)	
10	Keith Butler (ENG)	
11	J. Peter Callow (IOM)	
12	Tony Hutchings (WAL)	
13	Ian Thomson (SCO)	
14	Mel Davies (WAL)	
15	Abdullah Abu (MAL)	
16	J. Caron (CAN)	
17	D. I. Thornton (FRN)	
18	N. A. Rosli (MAL)	
19	J. G. Ferguson (CAN)	
-	Ian Edwards (AUS)	
-	Malcolm Powell (AUS)	
-	W. T. Wild (CAN)	
-	Ken Nuttall (ENG)	
-	Bob Addy (ENG)	
-	John E. Killip (IOM)	
-	Don Ecobichon (JER)	
-	Douglas Lidster (JER)	
-	Richie Thomson (NZL)	
-	Alfie Fairweather (SCO)	
-	Roger Gibbon (TRI)	
-	R. Cassidy (TRI)	
-	A. T. Young (FRN)	
-	B. W. Loxton (FRN)	
-	D. R. Hunter (FRN)	
-	Shararuddin Jaffar (MAL)	
-	A. Michael (MAL)	
