= Cycling at the 1962 British Empire and Commonwealth Games – Men's time trial =

Cycling Men's time trial at the 1962 British Empire and Commonwealth Games
- Venue: Lake Monger Velodrome, Leederville, Western Australia
- Dates: 1962

Medalists
gold medal	Peter Bartels	Australia
silver medal	Ian Chapman	Australia
bronze medal	Roger Whitfield	England

The men's time trial at the 1962 British Empire and Commonwealth Games, was part of the cycling programme, which took place in 1962.

The time trial took place at Lake Monger Velodrome in Leederville, Western Australia, a 333-metre 37 degree banked track,

Peter Bartels won the gold medal.

== Results ==
Pos	Athlete	Time
1	(Australia) Peter Bartels	1:12.9
2	(Australia) Ian Chapman	1:13.2
3	(England) Roger Whitfield	1:13.5
4	(Australia) Russell John Clark	1:13.6
4	(New Zealand) Graham F. Wright	1:13.6
6	(England) Harry Jackson	1:14.0
7	(Trinidad and Tobago) Roger Gibbon	1:15.4
8	(Isle of Man) Ron Killey	1:15.5
8	(Wales) Don Skene	1:15.5
10	(England) Karl Barton	1:15.9
11	(Trinidad and Tobago) R. Cassidy	1:17.1
12	(Jersey) Douglas Lidster	1:19.4
13	(Jersey) Don Ecobichon	1:19.9
14	(Isle of Man) John E. Killip	1:21.6
15	(Malaysia) Abdullah Abu	1:22.1
16	(Malaysia) Shararuddin Jaffar	1:25.0
17	(Malaysia) N. A. Rosli	1:26.3
