= Cycling at the 1970 British Commonwealth Games =

- Venue: Track: Meadowbank Velodrome; Road: Holyrood Park
- Location: Edinburgh, Scotland
- Dates: 16 to 25 July 1970

Cycling at the 1970 British Commonwealth Games was the eighth appearance of Cycling at the Commonwealth Games. The events were held in Edinburgh, Scotland, from 16 to 25 July 1970.

The track events took place in the Meadowbank Velodrome, which formed part of the Meadowbank Sports Centre, built specifically for the Games, at a cost of £2.8 million. The velodrome construction cost £90,000 and was located approximately 200 yards east of the sports centre.

The road race was a 102 miles route, consisting of 31 circuits of Holyrood Park and included climbs and a route through the Queen's Palace Gardens at the Palace of Holyroodhouse.

Australia topped the cycling medal table, by virtue of winning two gold medals, three silver and one bronze.

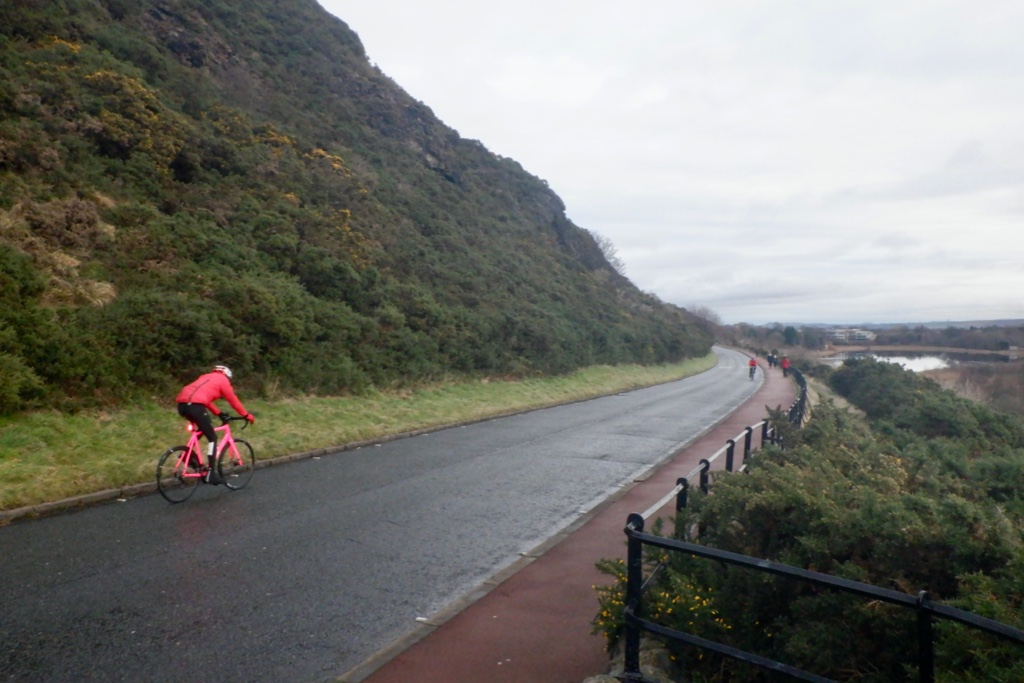
The road race went around Holyrood Park

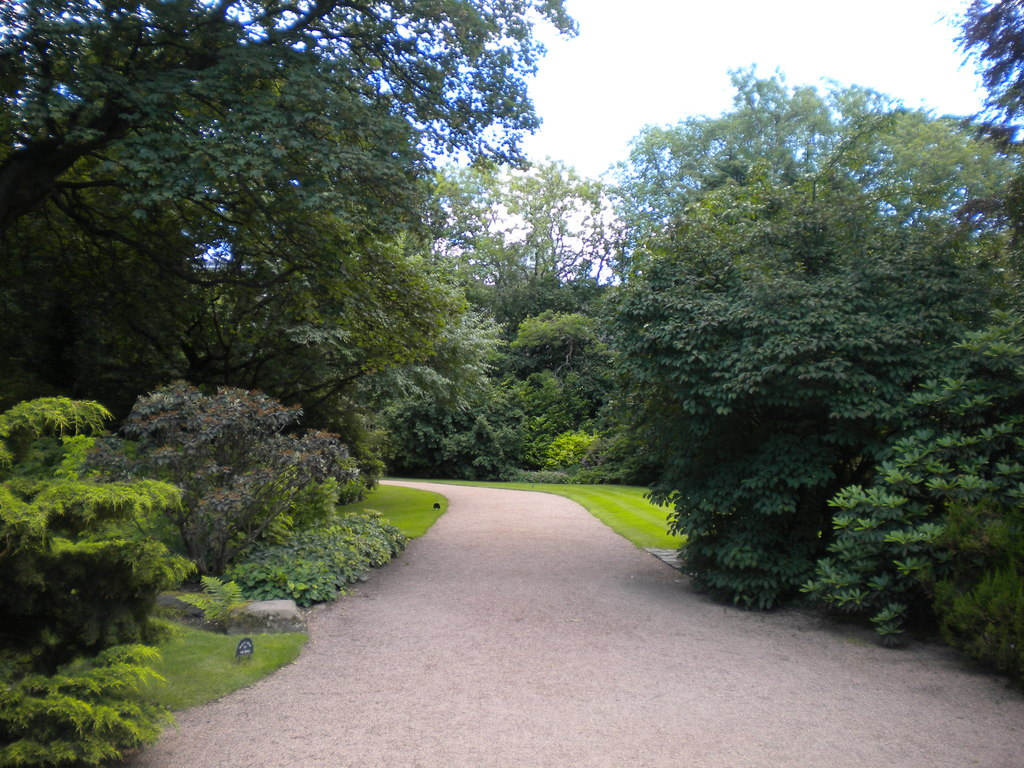
The course went past the gardens at the Palace of Holyroodhouse

== Medal table ==
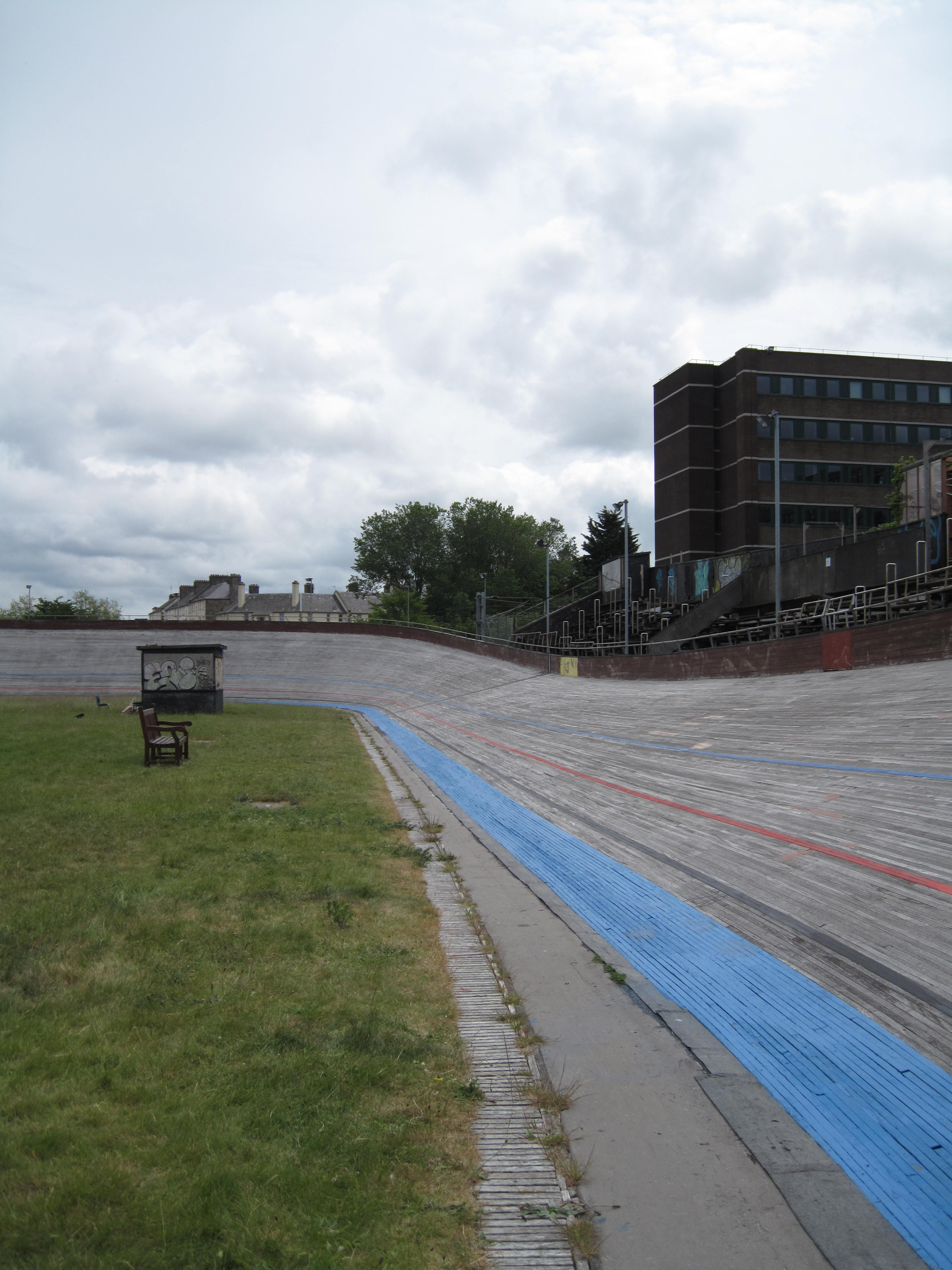
The Meadowbank Velodrome in 2015

* Host nation (Scotland)

Medals won by nation with totals, ranked by number of golds—sortable
Rank	Nation	Gold	Silver	Bronze	Total
1	Australia	2	3	1	6
2	New Zealand	2	0	1	3
3	Canada	1	1	1	3
4	England	1	0	0	1
5	Trinidad and Tobago	0	1	2	3
6	Scotland	0	1	0	1
7	Wales	0	0	1	1
Totals (7 entries)		6	6	6	18

== Medal winners ==
Event	Gold	Silver	Bronze
Road Race	(New Zealand) Bruce Biddle	(Australia) Ray Bilney	(Australia) John Trevorrow
Time Trial	(New Zealand) Harry Kent	(Trinidad and Tobago) Leslie King	(Canada) Jocelyn Lovell
Sprint	(Australia) John Nicholson	(Australia) Gordon Johnson	(Trinidad and Tobago) Leslie King
Individual Pursuit	(England) Ian Hallam	(Australia) Danny Clark	(New Zealand) Blair Stockwell
10 miles Scratch	(Canada) Jocelyn Lovell	(Scotland) Brian Temple	(Trinidad and Tobago) Vernon Stauble
Tandem	(Australia) Gordon Johnson; Ron Jonker	(Canada) Jocelyn Lovell; Barry Harvey	(Wales) John Hatfield; John Beswick

== Results ==
=== Road Race (top 18) ===
Pos	Athlete	Time
1	(New Zealand) Bruce Biddle	4:38:58.00 hours
2	(Australia) Ray Bilney	4:58:58.00
3	(Australia) John Trevorrow	4:40:26.00
4	(England) Dave Rollinson	4:41:2
5	(New Zealand) Bryce Beeston	4:41:2
6	(Isle of Man) Nigel J. Dean	4:42.5
7	(Isle of Man) Ernest Potter	4:44.4
8	(England) Gary Crewe	4:44.4
9	(Scotland) Andy McGhee	4:45.1
10	(England) Brian Rushton	4:45.1
11	(Wales) Grahame Jenkins	4:45:3
12	(Scotland) Andrew Brunton	4:45.3
13	(Canada) Thomas Morris	4:45:3
14	(Northern Ireland) Dave Kane	4:45:3
15	(Scotland) Billy Bilsland	4:46:0
16	(Isle of Man) Brian F. Roche	4:49:2
17	(Canada) Max Grace	4:50:6
18	(Scotland) Alex Gilchrist	4:50:6

=== Individual pursuit ===
Pos	Athlete
1	(England) Ian Hallam
2	(Australia) Danny Clark
3	(New Zealand) Blair Stockwell
4	(Australia) Dave Watson
5	(Australia) Douglas John Armstrong
5	(England) William Moore
5	(England) Ray Ward
5	(Canada) Frank Ludtke

Quarter-final

Athlete	Athlete	Score
Clark	Ludtke	caught
Watson	Ward	5.18.66/5.26.29
Hallam	Armstrong	5.9.67/5.14.08
Stockwell	Moore	5.12.32/5.16.57

Semi finals

Athlete	Athlete	Score
Hallam	Watson	5.09.63/5.17.17
Clark	Stockwell	5.06.19/5.09.17

Third place

Athlete	Athlete	Score
Stockwell	Watson	rode over

Final

Athlete	Athlete	Score
Hallam	Clark	5.01.41/5.04.93

=== Time trial (1km) ===
Pos	Athlete	Time
1	(New Zealand) Harry Kent	1:08.69
2	(Trinidad and Tobago) Leslie King	1:10.40
3	(Canada) Jocelyn Lovell	1:10.53
4	(Australia) Daryl Perkins	1:10.9
5	(Canada) Barry Harvey	1:11.0
6	(Australia) Danny Clark	1:11.4
7	(England) Michael Bennett	1:11.9
8	(Australia) John Nicholson	1:11.9
9	(Canada) Frank Ludtke	1:12.2
10	(New Zealand) Blair Stockwell	1:12.3
11	(Trinidad and Tobago) Vernon Stauble	1:12.5
12	(England) Ray Ward	1:12.7
13	(Scotland) Brian Temple	1:12.8
14	(Wales) John Pritchard	1:13.0
15	(Trinidad and Tobago) Robert Farrell	1:13.3
16	(England) Ronald Keeble	1:13.3

=== Sprint ===
Pos	Athlete
1	(Australia) John Nicholson
2	(Australia) Gordon Johnson
3	(Trinidad and Tobago) Leslie King
4	(New Zealand) Harry Kent
5	(Australia) Daryl Perkins
5	(Canada) Barry Harvey
5	(Trinidad and Tobago) Winston Attong
5	(New Zealand) Bryce Preston
9	(England) Bob Bicknell
9	(England) David Rowe
9	(Guyana) Neville Hunte
9	(Trinidad and Tobago) Leslie John
13	(England) Ernie Crutchlow
13	(New Zealand) Max Vertongen
13	(Scotland) Thomas Banks
13	(Scotland) Kenneth Whitson

Quarter-final

Athlete	Athlete	Score
Johnson	Harvey	2–0
Kent	Attong	2–0
King	Perkins	2–0
Nicholson	Preston	2–1

Semi finals

Athlete	Athlete	Score
Nicholson	King	2–1
Kent	Johnson	2–1

Third place

Athlete	Athlete	Score
King	Kent	2–1

Final

Athlete	Athlete	Score
Nicholson	Johnson	2–0

=== 10 miles scratch race ===
Pos	Athlete	Time
1	(Canada) Jocelyn Lovell	20:46.72
2	(Scotland) Brian Temple	20:47.56
3	(Trinidad and Tobago) Vernon Stauble	20:47.72
4	(New Zealand) Max Vertongen	20:53.8
5	(New Zealand) Bryce Preston	20:53.9
6	(New Zealand) Harry Kent	20:54.6
7	(England) Ronald Keeble	20:57.5
8	(Jersey) Douglas P. Lidster	20:57.6
9	(Scotland) Alex Gordon	20:58.7
10	(England) Ian Hallam	20:59.2
11	(Northern Ireland) David Beattie	20:59.4
12	(Wales) Mel Davies	20:59.5
13	(Australia) Gordon Johnson	20:59.5
14	(Australia) Ronald Jonker	20:59.5
15	(Trinidad and Tobago) Robert Farrell	

=== Tandem (2,000m) ===
Pos	Athlete
1	(Australia) Gordon Johnson & Ronald Jonker
2	(Canada) Jocelyn Lovell & Barry Harvey
3	(Wales) John Hatfield & John Beswick
4	(New Zealand) Bryce Preston & Max Vertongen
5	(Trinidad and Tobago) Winston Attong & Robert Farrell
6	(England) Tony Brockhurst & Pete Mugglestone

Quarter-final

Athlete	Athlete	Score
Australia	Wales	2–0
Canada	England	1–0, w/o
New Zealand	Trinidad & Tobago	2–0

Repechage

Athlete	Athlete	Score
Wales	Trinidad & Tobago	2–0

Semi finals

Athlete	Athlete	Score
Australia	Wales	2–0
Canada	New Zealand	2–1

Third place

Athlete	Athlete	Score
Wales	New Zealand	2–0

Final

Athlete	Athlete	Score
Australia	Canada	2–0

== See also ==
- List of Commonwealth Games medallists in cycling
