= Cycling at the 1962 British Empire and Commonwealth Games – Men's individual pursuit =

Cycling Men's individual pursuit at the 1962 British Empire and Commonwealth Games
- Venue: Lake Monger Velodrome, Leederville, Western Australia
- Dates: 1962

Medalists
gold medal	Maxwell Langshaw	Australia
silver medal	Richard Hine	Australia
bronze medal	Harry Jackson	England

The men's individual pursuit at the 1962 British Empire and Commonwealth Games, was part of the cycling programme, which took place in 1962.

The individual pursuit took place at Lake Monger Velodrome in Leederville, Western Australia, a 333-metre 37 degree banked track,

Maxwell Langshaw won the gold medal.

== Results ==
Pos	Athlete	Time
1	(Australia) Maxwell Langshaw	5:08.8
2	(Australia) Richard Hine	5:13.2
3	(England) Harry Jackson	5:14.2
4	(England) Charlie McCoy	5:15.2
5	(New Zealand) Arthur Candy	5:24.6, QF
6	(Australia) John Joseph Buckley	5:26.8, QF
7	(England) Joe McLean	5:30.4, QF
8	(Isle of Man) J. Peter Callow	5:31.0, QF
9	(Wales) Mel Davies	5:40.3, ht
10	(Jersey) Douglas Lidster	5:41.1, ht
11	(Isle of Man) John E. Killip	5:46.6, ht
12	(Wales) Tony Hutchings	5:50.5, ht
13	(Trinidad and Tobago) R. Cassidy	5:52.2, ht
14	(Malaysia) Abdullah Abu	5:55.2, ht
15	(Malaysia) N.A. Rosli	6:02.0, ht
16	(Malaysia) A. Michael	6:10.6, ht
