= Cycling at the 1962 British Empire and Commonwealth Games – Men's scratch =

Cycling Men's scratch race at the 1962 British Empire and Commonwealth Games
- Venue: Lake Monger Velodrome, Leederville, Western Australia
- Dates: November 1962

Medalists
gold medal	Doug Adams	Australia
silver medal	Warren Johnston	New Zealand
bronze medal	John Clarey	England

The men's scratch race at the 1962 British Empire and Commonwealth Games, was part of the cycling programme, which took place in 1962.

The scratch race took place over 10 miles at Lake Monger Velodrome in Leederville, Western Australia, on a 333 metre 37 degree banked track,

Doug Adams of Australia won the gold medal.

== Results ==
Pos	Athlete	Time
1	(Australia) Doug Adams	22:40:8
2	(New Zealand) Warren Johnston	
3	(England) John Clarey	
4	(Wales) Mel Davies	
	(Australia) Alan Frederick Dutton	
	(Australia) Joseph P Ciavola	
	(England) Joe McLean	
	(England) Harry Jackson	
	(Isle of Man) Ron Killey	
	(Isle of Man) John E. Killip	
	(Isle of Man) J. Peter Callow	
	(Jersey) Don Ecobichon	
	(Jersey) Douglas Lidster	
	(New Zealand) Graham F. Wright	
	(New Zealand) Arthur Candy	
	(Northern Ireland) Jack Johnston	
	(Scotland) Alfie Fairweather	
	(Scotland) Ian Thomson	
	(Trinidad and Tobago) Roger Gibbon	
	(Trinidad and Tobago) R. Cassidy	
	(Wales) Don Skene	
	(Wales) Tony Hutchings	
	(Federation of Rhodesia and Nyasaland) A. T. Young	
	(Federation of Rhodesia and Nyasaland) B. W. Loxton	
	(Federation of Rhodesia and Nyasaland) D. R. Hunter	
	(Malaysia) N. A. Rosli	
	(Malaysia) Shararuddin Jaffar	
	(Malaysia) Abdullah Abu	
