= Cycling at the 1962 British Empire and Commonwealth Games – Men's sprint =

Cycling Men's sprint at the 1962 British Empire and Commonwealth Games
- Venue: Lake Monger Velodrome, Leederville, Western Australia
- Dates: 1962

Medalists
gold medal	Thomas Harrison	Australia
silver medal	Karl Barton	England
bronze medal	Ian Browne	Australia

The men's sprint at the 1962 British Empire and Commonwealth Games, was part of the cycling programme, which took place in 1962.

The sprint took place at Lake Monger Velodrome in Leederville, Western Australia, a 333-metre 37 degree banked track,

Thomas Harrison won the gold medal.

== Results ==
Pos	Athlete
1	(Australia) Thomas Harrison
2	(England) Karl Barton
3	(Australia) Ian Browne
4	(New Zealand) Warren Johnston
5	(Australia) Barry Godkin
5	(England) Roger Whitfield
5	(Wales) Don Skene
5	(Federation of Rhodesia and Nyasaland) D. R. Hunter
9	(Isle of Man) Ron Killey
9	(Trinidad and Tobago) Roger Gibbon
11	(Jersey) Don Ecobichon
11	(Trinidad and Tobago) R. Cassidy
13	(Isle of Man) J.P. Callow
13	(Malaysia) N. A. Rosli
13	(Malaysia) Shararuddin Jaffar
13	(Malaysia) Abdullah Abu
17	(Jersey) Douglas Lidster
	(Federation of Rhodesia and Nyasaland) B. W. Loxton
	(England) John Clarey
	(Federation of Rhodesia and Nyasaland) A. T. Young

== Results ==
Heats

Heat	Winner	2nd	Time (last 200)
1	Barton	Lidster	w/o
2	Cassidy	Hunter	12.5
3	Harrison	Jaffar	12.2
4	Killey	Loxton	w/o
5	Godkin	Gibbon	12.3
6	Johnston	Rosli	12.3
7	Whitfield	Callow	11.8
8	Browne	Ecobichon	11.9
9	Skene	Aby	12.0

- Clarey & Young scratched

Second Round Repechage

Athlete	Athlete	Score
Hunter	Jaffar	12.6
Gibbon	Rosli	12.4
Ecobichon	Callow & Abu	12.9

Third Round

Athlete	Athlete	Score
Browne	Killey	12.4
Barton	Ecobichon	12.3
Harrison	Gibbon	12.0
Johnston	Hunter	12.3
Skene	Cassidy	12.6
Whitfield	Godkin	11.9

Fourthd Round Repechage

Athlete	Athlete	Score
Hunter	Killey & Cassidy	
Godkin	Gibbon & Ecobichon	12.9

Quarter-final

Athlete	Athlete	Score
Browne	Skene	2–0
Barton	Godkin	2–0
Harrison	Hunter	2–0
Johnston	Whitfield	2–0

Semi finals

Athlete	Athlete	Score
Harrison	Johnston	2–1
Barton	Browne	2–0

Third place

Athlete	Athlete	Score
Browne	Johnston	2–1

Final

Athlete	Athlete	Score
Harrison	Barton	2–0
