= Bob Bicknell (cyclist) =

English cyclist (born c.1944)

Personal information
- Nationality: British (English)
- Born: c.1944 Nuneaton, England

Sport
- Club: Coventry R.C.

Robert J. Bicknell (born c.1944) is a former British international cyclist who competed at the Commonwealth Games.

== Biography ==
Bicknell originally raced on grass before joining the Coventry Road Club. He was a draughtsman by profession.

In 1968, he was a half-mile national champion and represented England at international level and the Midlands at county level. He was runner-up behind Roger Whitfield at the 1969 British National Individual Sprint Championships and runner-up with Fred Booker at the British National Tandem Sprint Championships, behind Pete Mugglestone and Tony Brockhurst.

Bicknell represented the England team at the 1970 British Commonwealth Games in Edinburgh, Scotland, where he participated in the match sprint event.
