= Cycling at the 1966 British Empire and Commonwealth Games =

- Venue: Track:National Stadium, Kingston; Road:
- Dates: 4 to 13 August 1966

Cycling at the 1966 British Empire and Commonwealth Games was the seventh appearance of Cycling at the Commonwealth Games. The events were held from 4 to 13 August 1966.

The track events took place in the National Stadium in the Independence Park complex in Kingston. The road race was a 120 miles route, which was won by Peter Buckley for the Isle of Man. He had broken away with forty miles left and won despite having to change a punctured wheel with 18 miles left.

England topped the cycling medal table, by virtue of winning two gold medals, one silver and one bronze.

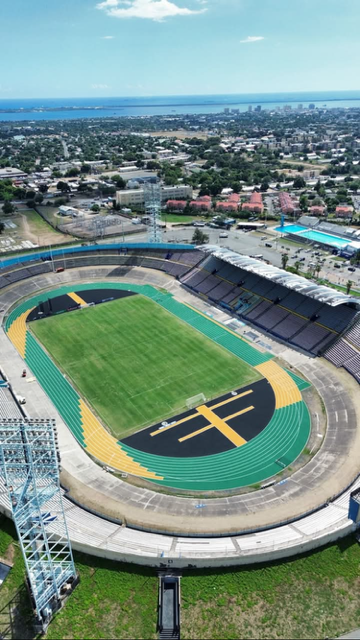
The National Stadium had a cycling circuit around the athletics track

== Medal table ==
* Host nation (Jamaica)

Medals won by nation with totals, ranked by number of golds—sortable
Rank	Nation	Gold	Silver	Bronze	Total
1	England	2	1	1	4
2	Trinidad and Tobago	2	0	0	2
3	Isle of Man	1	0	0	1
4	Australia	0	3	3	6
5	New Zealand	0	1	1	2
Totals (5 entries)		5	5	5	15

== Medal winners ==
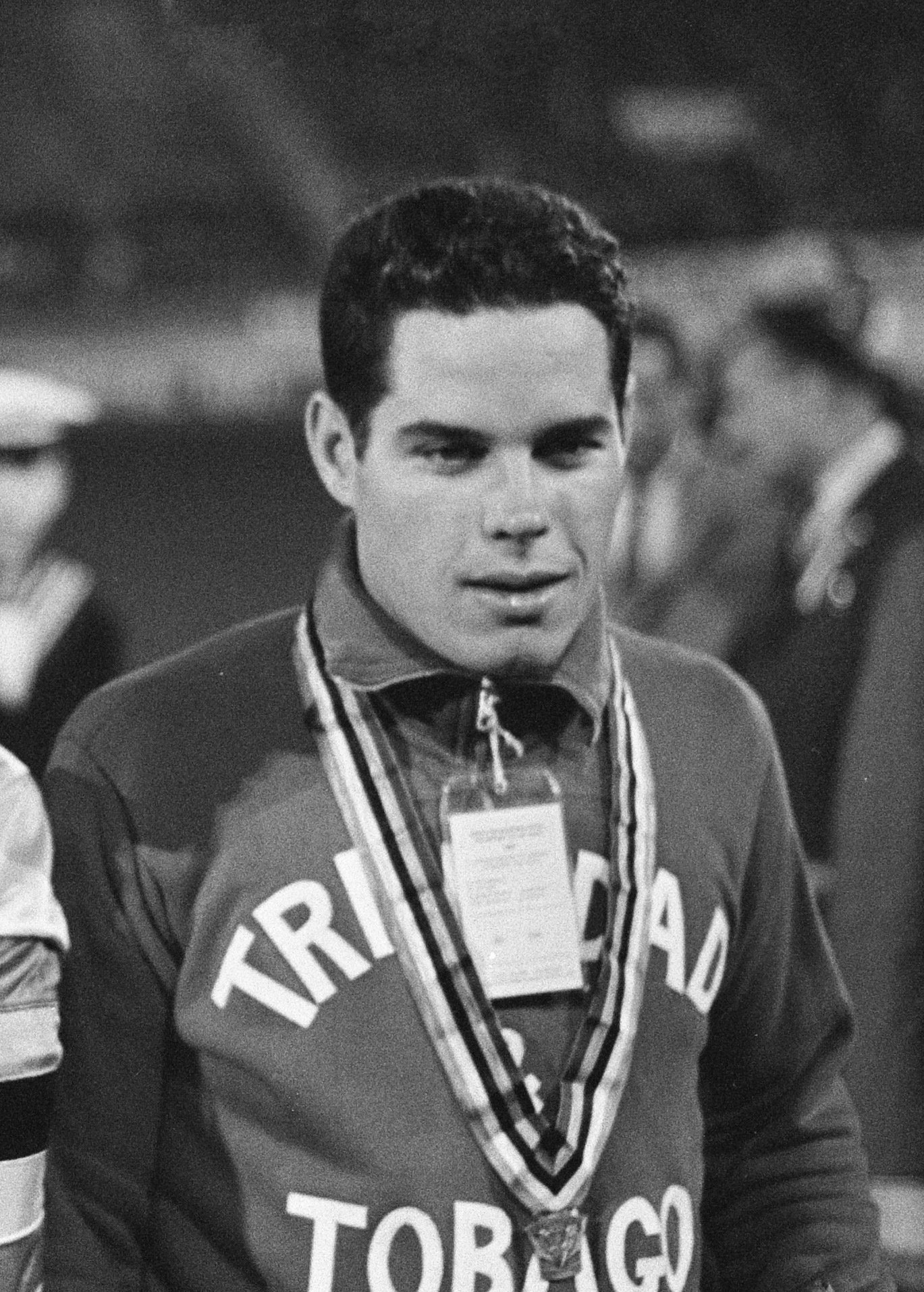
Roger Gibbon won double gold

Event	Gold	Silver	Bronze
Road Race	(Isle of Man) Peter Buckley	(New Zealand) Des Thomson	(New Zealand) Laurie Byers
Time Trial	(Trinidad and Tobago) Roger Gibbon	(Australia) Phil Bristow-Stagg	(Australia) Richard Hine
Sprint	(Trinidad and Tobago) Roger Gibbon	(England) Fred Booker	(Australia) Daryl Perkins
Individual Pursuit	(England) Hugh Porter	(Australia) John Bylsma	(Australia) Richard Hine
10 Miles Scratch	(England) Ian Alsop	(Australia) Hilton Clarke	(England) Trevor Bull

== Results ==
=== Road Race (top 16) ===
Pos	Athlete	Time
1	(Isle of Man) Peter Buckley	5:07:52.5
2	(New Zealand) Des Thomson	5:12:11.2
3	(New Zealand) Laurie Byers	5:12:19.8
4	(Australia) Malcolm McCredie	5:12:20.4
5	(Northern Ireland) Dave Kane	5:12:20.7
6	(Wales) Colin Lewis	5:12:21.0
7	(Northern Ireland) Morris Foster	5:14:39.6
8	(England) Dave Nie	5:17:11.7
9	(Scotland) Billy Bilsland	5:18:30.1
10	(England) Hugh Porter	5:25:22.2
11	(Canada) Samuel Watson	5:36:17.9
12	(Canada) Dominico Muro	5:37:04.1
13	(Canada) Joseph Jones	5:39:59.2
14	(New Zealand) Richie Thomson	5:39:59.4
15	(New Zealand) Tino Tabak	5:40:50.6
16	(Australia) Ray Bilney	5:43:10.0

=== Individual pursuit (top 16) ===
Pos	Athlete	Time
1	(England) Hugh Porter	4:56.6
2	(Australia) John Bylsma	4:59.0
3	(Australia) Richard Hine	5:03.7
4	(England) Harry Jackson	5:07.7
5	(England) Brendan McKeown	QF 5:09.3
5	(New Zealand) Graham F. Wright	QF 5:21.3
5	(New Zealand) David A. Comparini	QF 5:22.8
5	(Jersey) Douglas P. Lidster	QF Caught
9	(Wales) Eddie Smart	ht 5:19.5
9	(Wales) Colin Lewis	ht 5:22.5
9	(Isle of Man) Nigel J. Dean	ht 5:23.0
9	(Wales) Roger Pratt	ht 5:23.6
9	(Australia) Malcolm McCredie	ht 5:23.7
9	(Guyana) David de Freitas	ht 5:24.2
9	(Isle of Man) John N. Corkhill	ht 5:29.7
9	(Canada) Andre Cloutier	ht 5:37.9

=== Time trial (top 16) ===
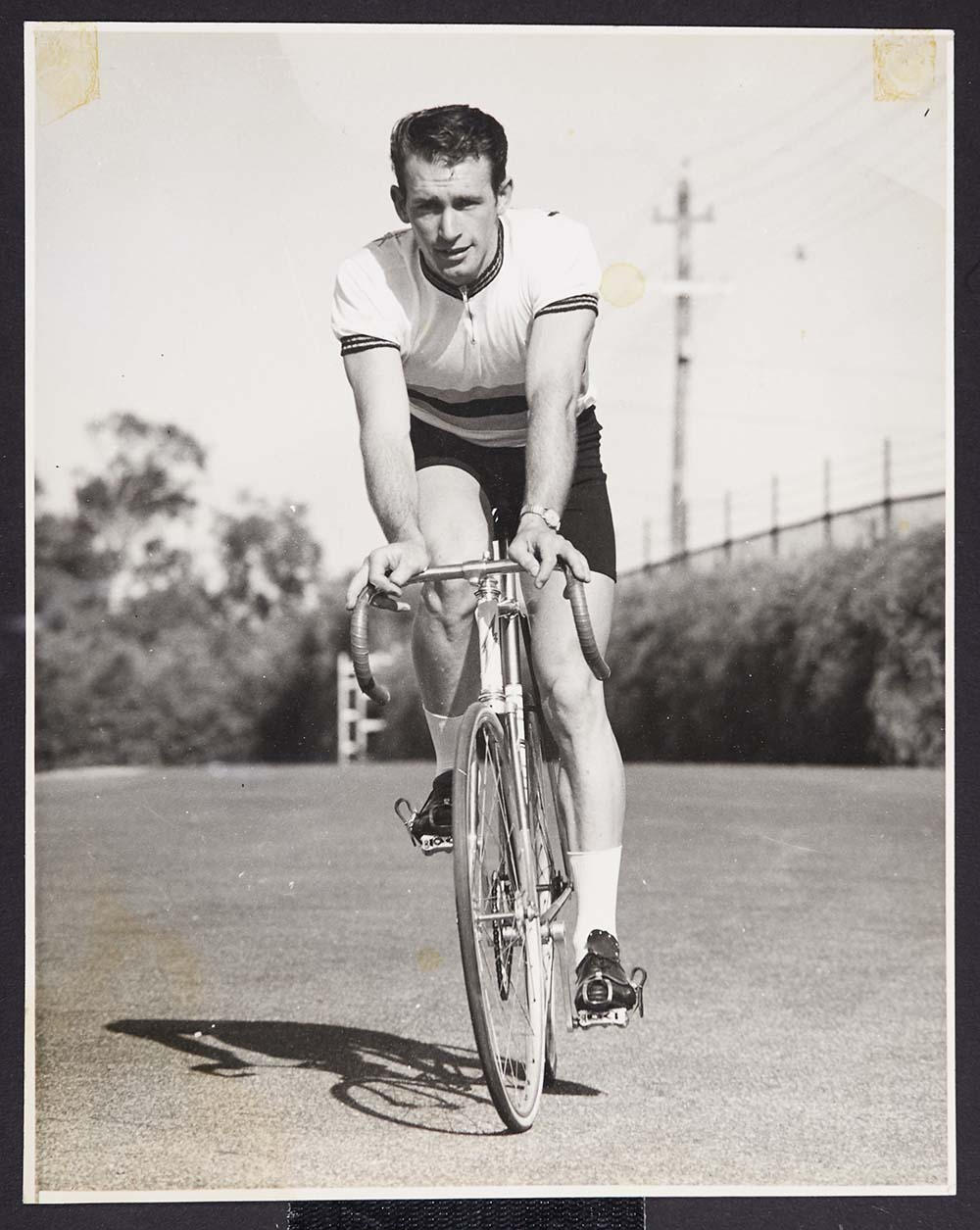
Phil Bristow-Stagg won silver in the time trial

Pos	Athlete	Time
1	(Trinidad and Tobago) Roger Gibbon	1:09.60
2	(Australia) Phil Bristow-Stagg	1:10.90
3	(Australia) Richard Hine	1:11.08
4	(England) Fred Booker	1:11.20
5	(New Zealand) Graham F. Wright	1:11.50
6	(Australia) Hilton Clarke	1:11.51
7	(England) Ian Alsop	1:12.2
8	(England) Billy Whiteside	1:12.9
9	(Trinidad and Tobago) Leslie King	1:15.2
9	(New Zealand) Dave Comparini	1:15.2
11	(Canada) Andre Gosselin	1:15.5
12	(Isle of Man) Nigel J. Dean	1:15.7
13	(Guyana) David de Freitas	1:15.9
14	(Jersey) Douglas P. Lidster	1:16.0
15	(Wales) Eddie Smart	1:16.0
16	(Wales) John Dyer	1:16.1

=== Sprint (top 16) ===
Pos	Athlete
1	(Trinidad and Tobago) Roger Gibbon
2	(England) Fred Booker
3	(Australia) Daryl Perkins
4	(Australia) Hilton Clarke
5	(Australia) Jeffrey Bruce Linden
5	(England) Dave Watkins
5	(England) Reg Barnett
5	(Trinidad and Tobago) Fitzroy Hoyte
9	(Barbados) Christopher W. Fields
9	(Barbados) Beresford K. Springer
9	(Canada) Andre Gosselin
9	(Canada) Andre Cloutier
9	(Jamaica) Bryan Phillips
9	(New Zealand) John A. Bigwood
9	(New Zealand) Donald L. Booth
9	(Trinidad and Tobago) Leslie King

Quarter-final

Athlete	Athlete	Score
Perkins	Watkins	2–1
Gibbon	Linden	2–0
Clarke	Barnett	2–1
Booker	Hoyte	2–0

Semi finals

Athlete	Athlete	Score
Gibbon	Clarke	2–0
Booker	Perkins	2–0

Third place

Athlete	Athlete	Score
Perkins	Clarke	2–0

Final

Athlete	Athlete	Score
Gibbon	Booker	2–0

=== 10 miles scratch race ===
Pos	Athlete	Time
1	(England) Ian Alsop	21:46
2	(Australia) Hilton Clarke	21:46
3	(England) Trevor Bull	21:47
4	(Jamaica) H. Miranda	
-	(Australia) Richard Hine	
-	(Australia) Phil Bristow-Stagg	
-	(Barbados) Michael Stoute	
-	(Barbados) Dan D. Stoute	
-	(Barbados) Christopher W. Fields	
-	(British Honduras) Lorenzo A. Zelaya	
-	(British Honduras) Kenneth Sutherland	
-	(British Honduras) John E. Miguel	
-	(Canada) Andre Gosselin	
-	(Canada) Andre Cloutier	
-	(England) Dave Watkins	
-	(Guyana) David de Freitas	
-	(Guyana) Archie Britton	
-	(Isle of Man) Ernest Potter	
-	(Isle of Man) Nigel J. Dean	
-	(Isle of Man) John N. Corkhill	
-	(Jamaica) D. Beckford	
-	(Jamaica) T. Silvera	
-	(New Zealand) Graham F. Wright	
-	(New Zealand) John A. Bigwood	
-	(New Zealand) Donald L. Booth	
-	(Northern Ireland) Steve Chivers	
-	(Northern Ireland) Morris Foster	
-	(Trinidad and Tobago) Fitzroy Hoyte	
-	(Trinidad and Tobago) Roger Gibbon	
-	(Trinidad and Tobago) Leslie King	
-	(Wales) John Dyer	
-	(Wales) Eddie Smart	

== See also ==
- List of Commonwealth Games medallists in cycling
