= Brian Rushton (cyclist) =

English cyclist

Personal information
- Nationality: British (English)
- Born: England

Sport
- Club: Hull & ERCC; Humber Velo

Brian Rushton is a former British international cyclist who competed at the Commonwealth Games.

== Biography ==
Rushton originally rode for the Hull and East Riding Road Club before joining Humber Velo. He represented England at international level.

A successful 1970 saw his selection for the road race team at the 1970 British Commonwealth Games. He subsequently represented the England team at the 1970 British Commonwealth Games in Edinburgh, Scotland, where he participated in the road race event.
