= Charles McCoy =

Charles McCoy may refer to:

- Charlie McCoy (born 1941), American harmonica player
- Papa Charlie McCoy (1909–1950), American blues musician
- Charlie McCoy (cyclist) (born 1937), British Olympic cyclist
- C. J. McCoy, American football and basketball coach
- Kid McCoy (1872–1940), American boxer
