= Jack Johnston =

Jack Johnston may refer to:

- J. W. Johnston (1876–1946), Irish American stage and film actor
- Jack Johnston (footballer) (1887–1962), Australian rules footballer
- Jack Johnston (cyclist), racing cyclist from Northern Ireland
- John Johnston (econometrician), known as Jack, British econometrician
