= Robert Addy (disambiguation) =

Robert Addy (1913–1996) was an American actor of stage, television, and film.

Robert Addy may also refer to:

- Bob Addy (1842–1910), Canadian right fielder and second baseman
- Bob Addy (cyclist) (born 1941), British former cyclist
