= 1986 Commonwealth Games =

Multi-sport event in Edinburgh, Scotland

XIII Commonwealth Games
- Host city: Edinburgh, Scotland
- Nations: 27
- Athletes: 1,660
- Events: 161 events in 10 sports
- Opening: 24 July 1986
- Closing: 2 August 1986
- Opened by: Elizabeth II
- Queen's Baton Final Runner: Allan Wells
- Main venue: Meadowbank Stadium

The 1986 Commonwealth Games were held in Edinburgh, Scotland, between 24 July and 2 August 1986. This was the second Commonwealth Games to be held in Edinburgh. Thirty-two of the eligible fifty-nine countries (largely African, Asian and Caribbean states) boycotted the event because of the Thatcher government's policy of keeping Britain's sporting links with apartheid South Africa.

The Games were commemorated on the UK's first-ever £2 circulating coin, which showed a Scottish thistle upon the St. Andrew's saltire design on the reverse side of the coin.

== Organisation ==
Unlike the 1970 Games in Edinburgh, which were popular and successful, the 1986 Games are ill-famed for the wide political boycott connected with them and the resulting financial mismanagement.

== Controversies ==
In addition to the boycott, further controversy arose when it was revealed that through this much-reduced participation and the resultant decline in anticipated broadcasting and sponsorship revenues, the Organising Committee was facing a big financial black hole. The boycott ended any prospect of securing emergency government assistance. Businessman Robert Maxwell stepped in to offer funding, taking over as chairman; but although he promised to invest £2m, his contribution was just £250,000. On a budget of £14m, the Games opened with a deficit of £3m, which later grew to £4.3m, and instead of putting enough money into the event to save it, the new chairman of the Games asked creditors to forgo half the payment due to them to keep the event out of liquidation. The debt was finally paid off in 1989, with the city of Edinburgh losing approximately £500,000.

Several athletes were excluded because they breached the amateurism rules, most notably lawn bowlers Phil Skoglund from New Zealand and Willie Wood from Scotland, both of whom have competed in subsequent Games.

== Participating teams ==
Due to the boycott only 27 teams from across the Commonwealth were represented at the 1986 Games.

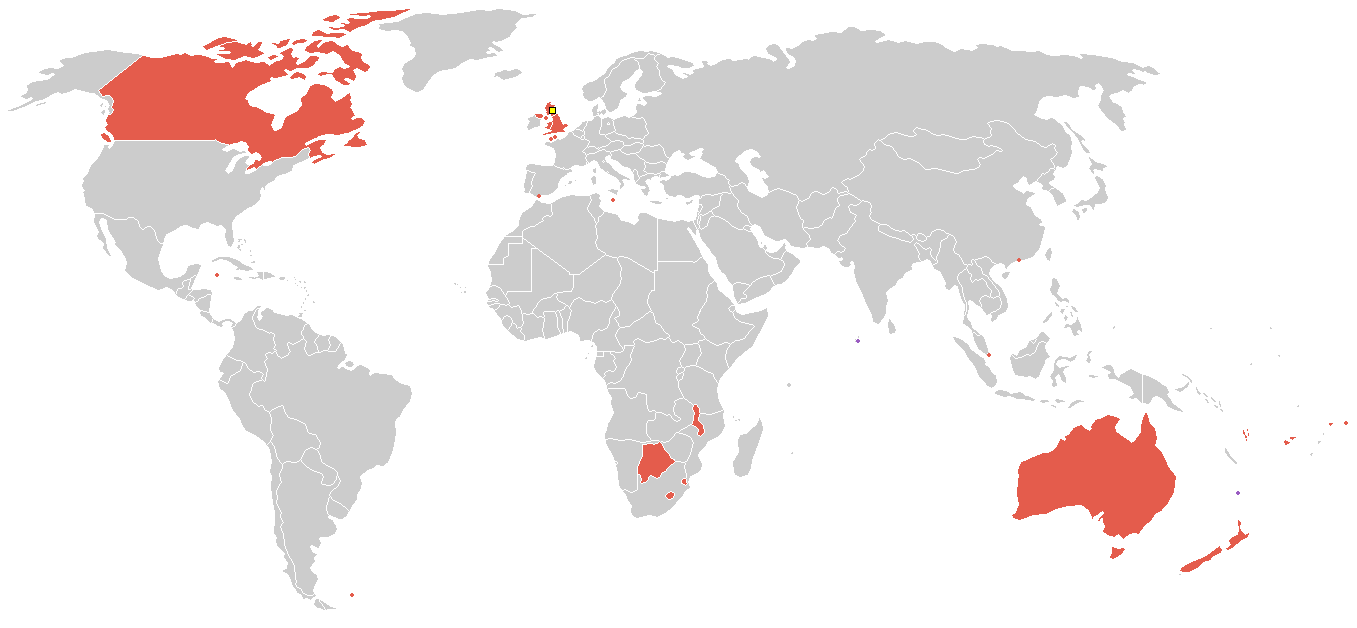
Participating Commonwealth countries and Territories

Participating Commonwealth countries and territories
- Australia
- Bermuda
- Botswana
- Canada
- Cayman Islands
- Cook Islands
- England
- Falkland Islands
- Fiji
- Gibraltar
- Guernsey
- Hong Kong
- Isle of Man
- Jersey
- Lesotho
- Malawi
- Maldives
- Malta
- New Zealand
- Norfolk Island
- Northern Ireland
- Scotland (host)
- Singapore
- Swaziland
- Vanuatu
- Wales
- Western Samoa

Note: Bermuda withdrew from the games to join the boycott after the opening day of competition.

Debuting Commonwealth countries and territories
- Norfolk Island
- Maldives

== Boycott ==
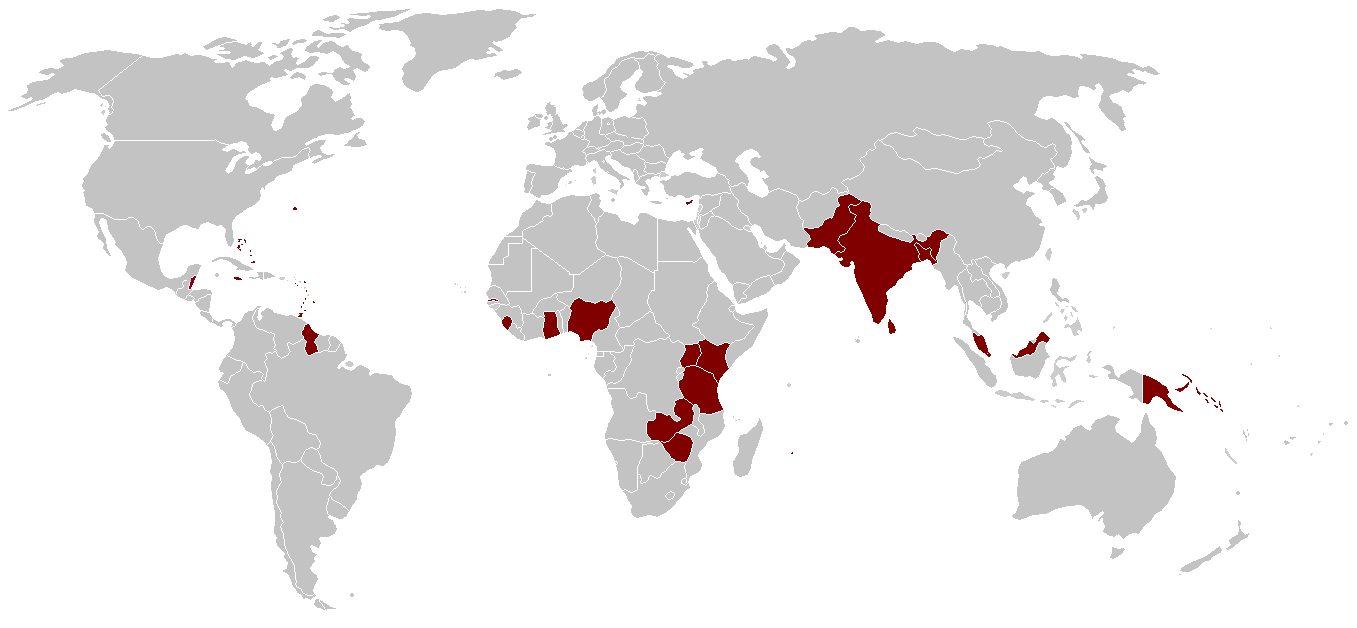
1986 Commonwealth Games boycotting countries dark red

Thirty-two of the eligible fifty-nine countries (largely African, Asian and Caribbean states) boycotted the event because of the Thatcher government's policy of keeping Britain's sporting links with apartheid South Africa in preference to participating in the general sporting boycott of that country and the American-led boycott of the 1980 Summer Olympics in Moscow in protest of the Soviet invasion of Afghanistan. Consequently, Edinburgh 1986 witnessed the lowest turnout since Auckland 1950. Bermuda was a particularly late withdrawal, as its athletes had appeared in the opening ceremony and in the opening day of competition before the Bermuda Olympic Association decided to formally withdraw.

Commonwealth countries and territories that boycotted the Games
- Antigua and Barbuda
- Barbados
- Bahamas
- Bangladesh
- Bermuda
- Belize
- Cyprus
- Dominica
- Gambia
- Ghana
- Guyana
- Grenada
- India
- Jamaica
- Kenya
- Mauritius
- Malaysia
- Nigeria
- Pakistan
- Papua New Guinea
- St. Kitts and Nevis
- St. Lucia
- St. Vincent and the Grenadines
- Solomon Islands
- Sierra Leone
- Sri Lanka
- Tanzania
- Trinidad and Tobago
- Turks and Caicos Islands
- Uganda
- Zambia
- Zimbabwe

== Opening ceremony ==
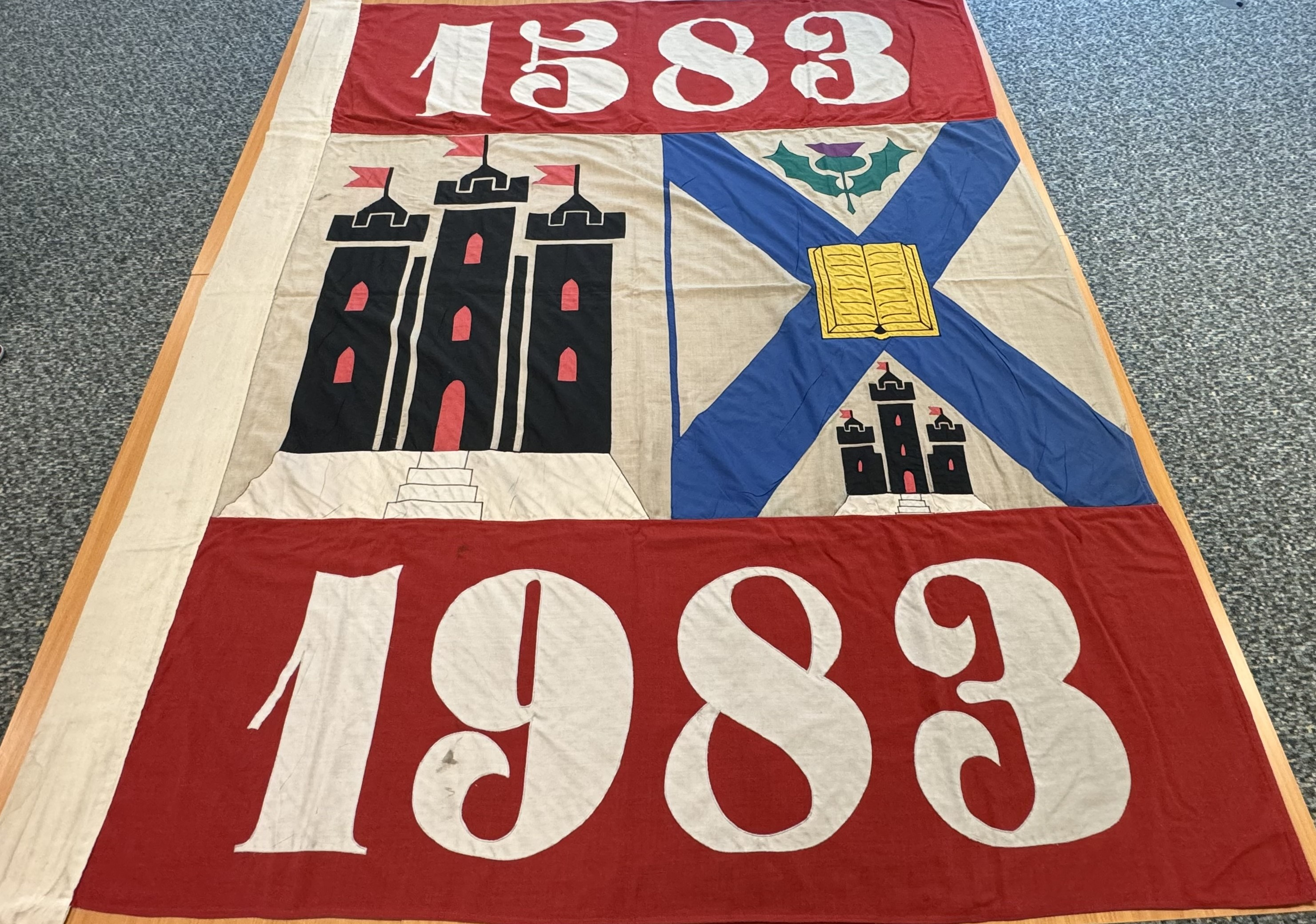
Banner celebrating the University of Edinburgh Quartercentenary in 1986

The theme of the opening ceremony celebrated the "Spirit of Youth" and included 6500 Scottish schoolchildren taking part in a series of large Mass Games-style Gymnastics routines. The theme song "Spirit of Youth" was written by Gerard Kenny. The ceremony began on the esplanade of Edinburgh Castle from which hundreds of schoolchildren ran down the Royal Mile, through Holyrood Park to Meadowbank Stadium.

== Venues ==
- Balgreen, (Bowls)
- Barry Buddon (Shooting)
- Ingliston Showground Pavilion (also called the Exhibition Hall) (Boxing)
- Meadowbank Stadium (Badminton)
- Playhouse Theatre (Wrestling and weightlifting)
- Royal Commonwealth Pool (Aquatics)
- Strathclyde Park, Glasgow (Rowing)
- Meadowbank Velodrome (Track cycling)

== Sports ==
- Aquatics ()
  - Diving ()
  - Swimming ()
  - Synchronised swimming ()
- Athletics ()
- Badminton ()
- Boxing ()
- Cycling ()
- Judo () (demonstration event)
- Lawn bowls ()
- Rowing ()
- Shooting ()
- Weightlifting ()
- Wrestling ()

== Medal table ==
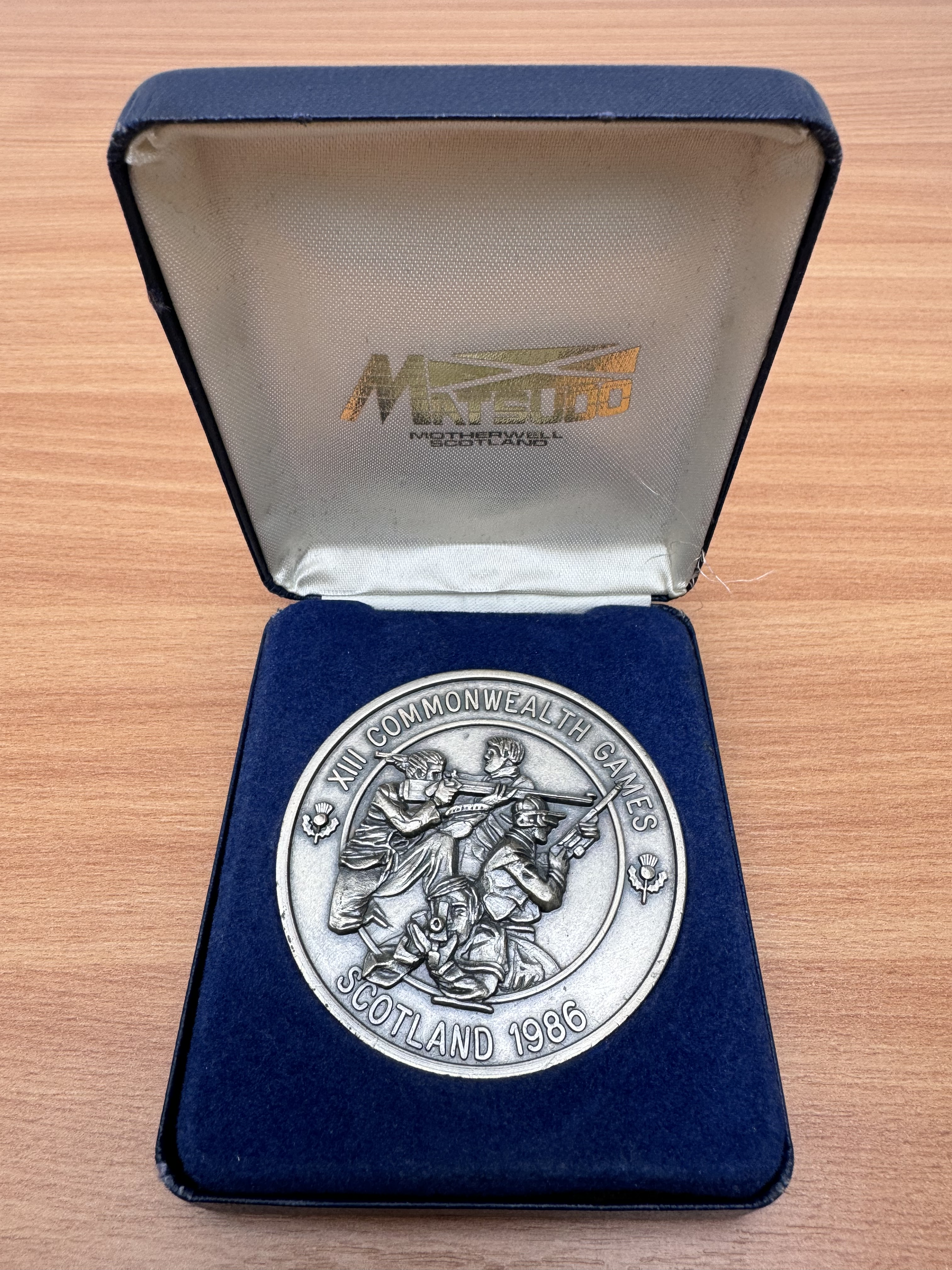
Commonwealth games medal, 1986

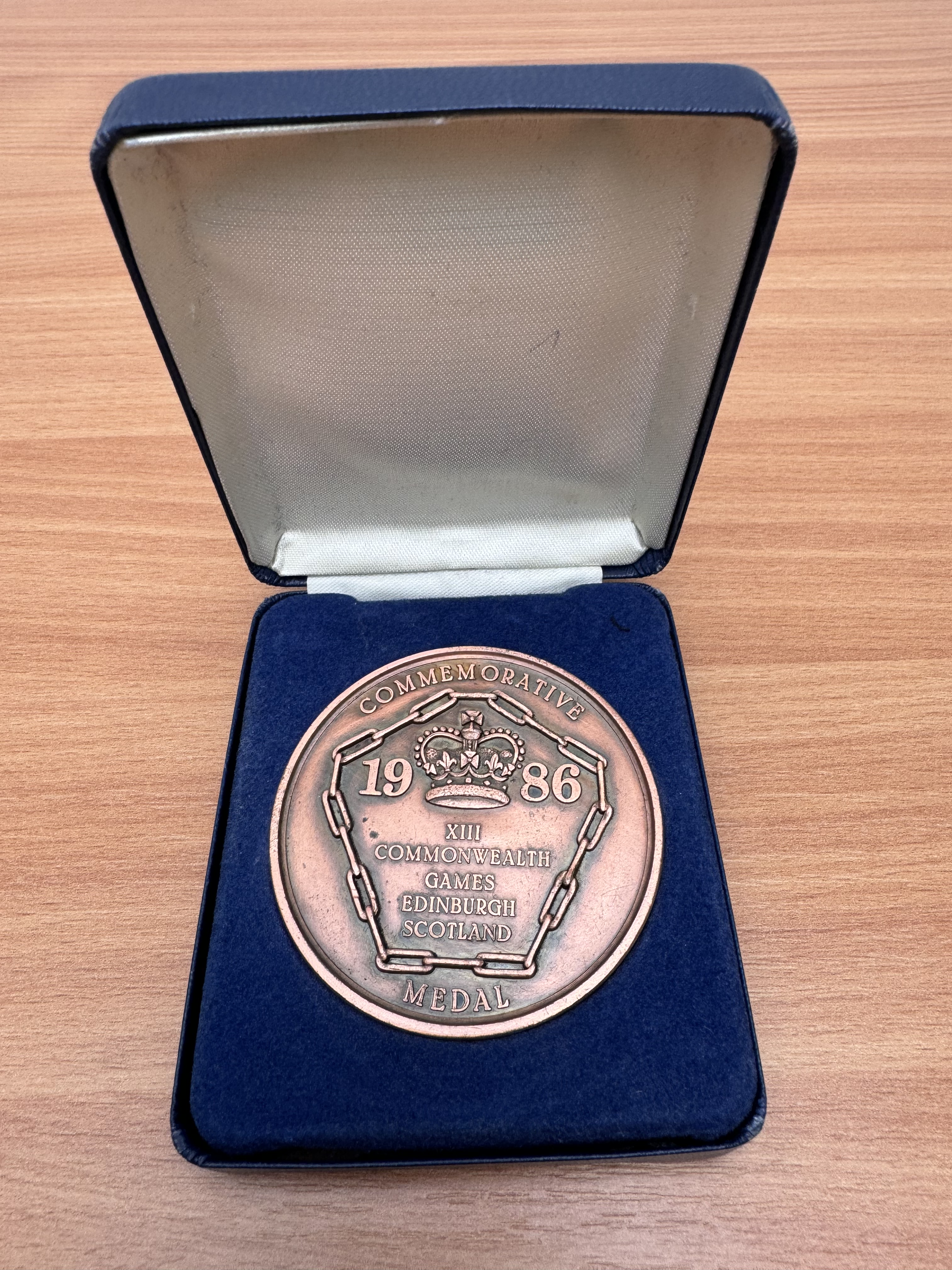
Commemorative medal front side

* Host nation (Scotland)

Rank	Nation	Gold	Silver	Bronze	Total
1	England	52	43	49	144
2	Canada	51	34	31	116
3	Australia	40	46	35	121
4	New Zealand	8	16	14	38
5	Wales	6	5	11	22
6	Scotland*	3	12	18	33
7	Northern Ireland	2	4	9	15
8	Isle of Man	1	0	0	1
9	Guernsey	0	2	0	2
10	Swaziland	0	1	0	1
11	Hong Kong	0	0	2	2
11	Malawi	0	0	2	2
13	Botswana	0	0	1	1
13	Jersey	0	0	1	1
13	Singapore	0	0	1	1
Totals (15 entries)		163	163	174	500

== See also ==
- 1970 Commonwealth Games, held in Edinburgh
- 2014 Commonwealth Games, held in Glasgow
- 2026 Commonwealth Games, held in Glasgow

Preceded by Brisbane	Commonwealth Games; Edinburgh; XIII Commonwealth Games	Succeeded by Auckland
