= Ken Nuttall =

British

Personal information
- Nationality: {British (English)
- Born: 19 February 1942 Heywood, Greater Manchester, England
- Died: 21 December 1969 (aged 27) Nhulunbuy (Gove), Northern Territory, Australia
- Education: St Lukes CofE Primary and Bamford Road Secondary Modern schools, both in Heywood.
- Occupation(s): Foundryman and professional cyclist.
- Years active: 1961–1966

Sport
- Sport: Cycling
- Event: Road
- Club: Manchester Wheelers

Kenneth Nelson Nuttall (19 February 1942 – 21 December 1969) was a male cyclist who competed for England.

== Biography ==
Nuttall represented England at the 1962 British Empire and Commonwealth Games in Perth, Western Australia participating in the road race.

He rode for the Manchester Wheelers as an amateur and was runner-up in the 1963 British National Road Race Championships.
