= Tony Brockhurst =

English cyclist

Personal information
- Nationality: British (English)
- Born: Q3. 1946 Leicester, England

Sport
- Club: Leicester Forest CC

Anthony J. Brockhurst (born 1946) is a former British international cyclist who competed at the Commonwealth Games.

== Biography ==
In 1968, Brockhurst joined the Leicester Forest Cycling Club, where he teamed up with Pete Mugglestone in the tandem. In 1969 he won the tandem title with Mugglestone at the British National Tandem Sprint Championships and made his England debut in 1969.

In 1970, the tandem pair won a joint award for the Memorial Trophy, for the best service to the club, in addition to breaking club and county records over varying distances. Later that year he won a second tandem title with Mugglestone at the British National Tandem Sprint Championships.

Brockhurst represented the England team at the 1970 British Commonwealth Games in Edinburgh, Scotland, where he participated in the tandem event. During the tandem event, the pair crashed and suffered injuries, with Mugglestone breaking a collar-bone and suffering concussion.

Brockhurst was a chartered accountant by profession.
