= Joe McLean (cyclist) =

British cyclist

Personal information
- Born: 30 July 1935 (age 91) Liverpool, England
- Height: 182 cm (6 ft 0 in)
- Weight: 72 kg (159 lb)

Cycling career
- Sport: Cycling

Amateur team
- Melling Wheelers

Joseph P. McLean (born 30 July 1935) is a former British cyclist who competed at the 1960 Summer Olympics.

== Biography ==
At the 1960 Olympic Games in Rome, he participated in the team pursuit.

He represented the 1962 English Team at the 1962 British Empire and Commonwealth Games in Perth, Australia, participating in the 10 miles scratch event and the 4,000 metres individual pursuit.

He was also a member of Melling Wheelers and was the British Cycling Federation senior sprint champion.
