= Ray Ward =

English cyclist

Personal information
- Nationality: British (English)
- Born: born c.1944 England

Sport
- Club: Oldbury & District CC; Walsall RCC

Ray Ward (born c.1944) is a former British international cyclist who competed at the Commonwealth Games.

== Biography ==
Ward rode for the Oldbury and District Cycling Club in the West Midlands.

In January 1970, he successfully appealed against a disqualification after winning the Campagnolo Trophy. At the hearing the Road Time Trials Council upheld his appeal. Also in 1970 he was the 25 mile national champion and record holder.

Ward represented the England team at the 1970 British Commonwealth Games in Edinburgh, Scotland, where he participated in the 1 km time trial and individual pursuit events.

In 1971, he represented Great Britain at the world championships and later rode for the Walsall Road Cycling Club.
