= Phil Bristow-Stagg =

Welsh cyclist

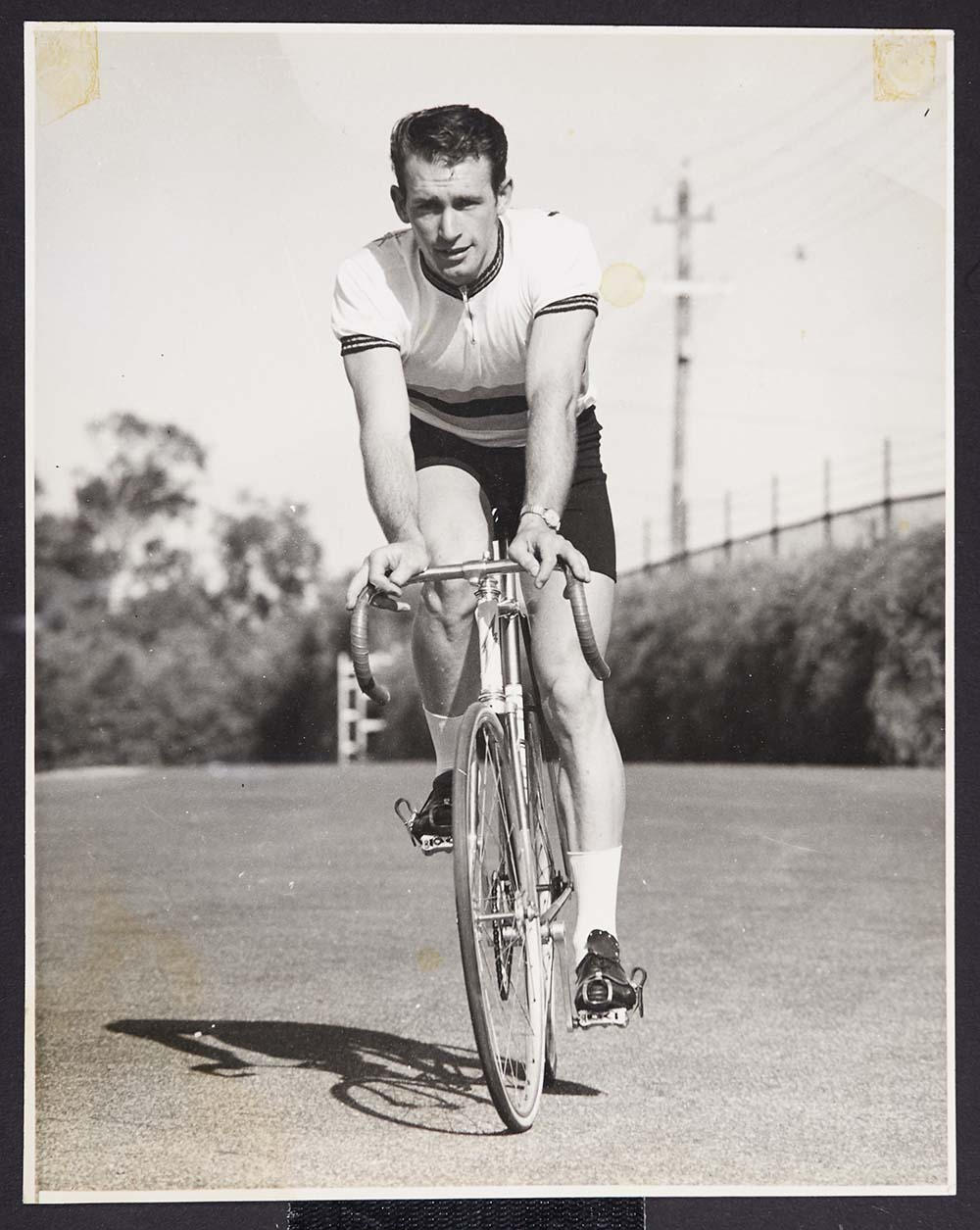

Personal information
- Nationality: Australian
- Born: 1945 Northam, Australia
- Died: 2014 (aged 68–69) Australia

Sport
- Sport: cycling
- Event(s): Track and Road
Medal record
Cycling
Representing Australia
British Empire & Commonwealth Games
Silver medal – second place	1966 Kingston	time trial

Phillip Watts Bristow-Stagg (1945 – 2014) was a racing cyclist from Australia, who competed at the 1966 British Empire and Commonwealth Games (now Commonwealth Games) and won a silver medal.

== Biography ==
Bristow-Stagg was born in Northam, Western Australia during 1945. He found work at the Midland Railway workshops as a fitter and turner.

He won the track Champion of Champions in 1964, 1965 and 1966. Additionally, in 1965 he was the road champion over 25, 50 and 125 miles.

He represented the 1966 Australian team at the 1966 British Empire and Commonwealth Games in Kingston, Jamaica, participating in two events during the cycling programme. He competed in the scratch, sprint and time trial. He won the silver medal in the latter.
