= Steve Chivers =

Northern Irish cyclist

Personal information
- Nationality: British (Northern Irish)
- Born: c.1941 Northern Ireland

Sport
- Sport: Cycling
- Events: Road race, 10 mile scratch
- Club: Cyprus CC

Steven Chivers (born c.1941) is a former racing cyclist from Northern Ireland, who represented Northern Ireland at the British Empire and Commonwealth Games (now Commonwealth Games).

== Biography ==
Chivers grew up in Rathcoole (Newtownabbey) and was a member of the Cyprus Cycling Club. A plumber by profession, he won the 1965 King's Moss 13.5 miles time trial and represented Belfast in the 1965 Guinness Tour of the North. and was the 1966 champion of Ireland over 100 miles.

Chivers represented the 1966 Northern Irish Team at the 1966 British Empire and Commonwealth Games in Kingston, Jamaica. While in Jamaica, he had to train under escort following the assault and robbery of one of the Scottish cylists while training.

He participated in two events; the road race and the 10 miles scratch race.
