= Meadowbank Velodrome =

Sporting venue in Edinburgh, Scotland

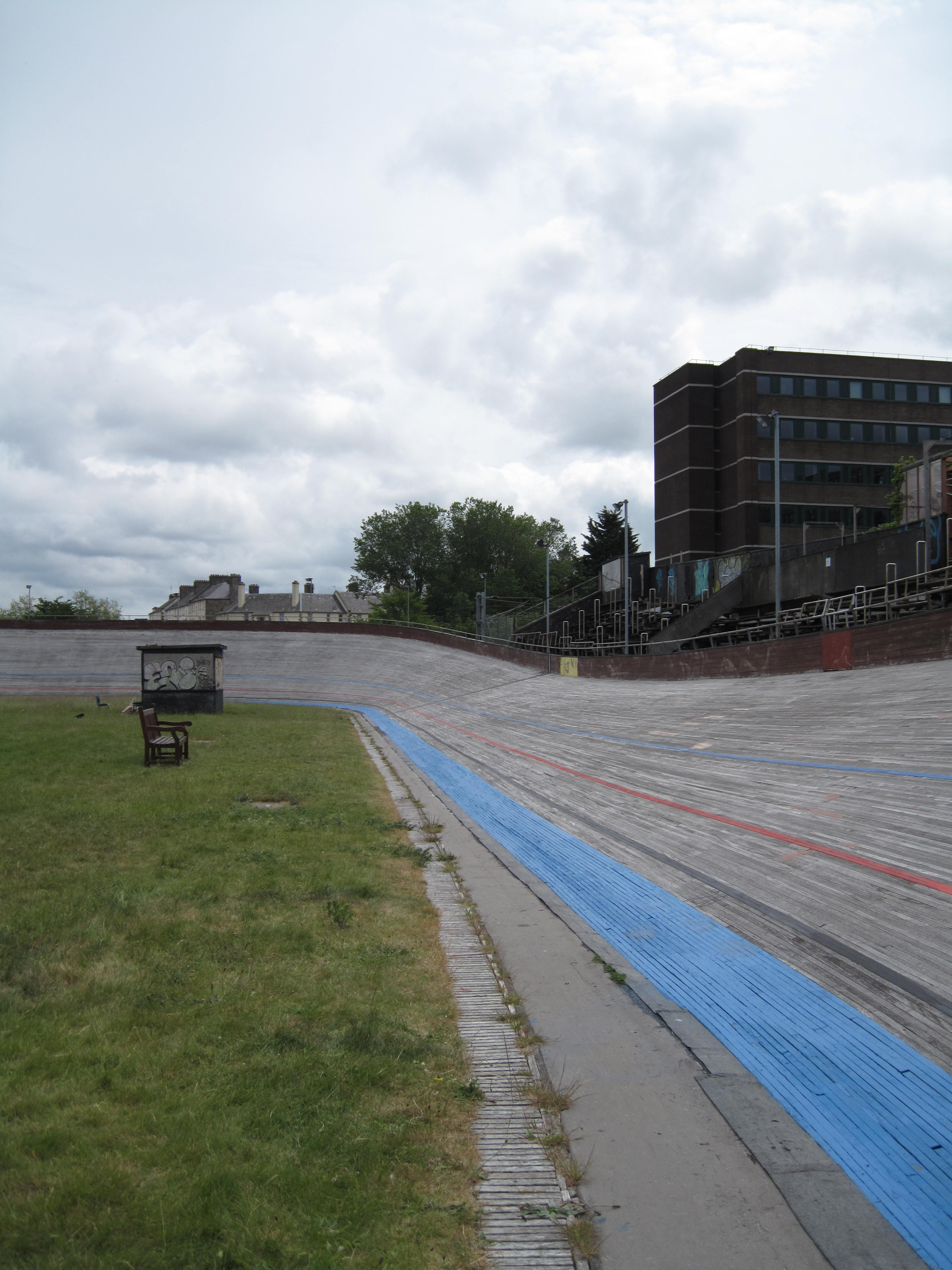
- The Meadowbank Velodrome in 2015, two years before it closed
- Interactive map of Meadowbank Velodrome
- Location: London Road, Edinburgh, Scotland

Construction
- Opened: 1970; 56 years ago
- Demolished: 2018; 8 years ago

The Meadowbank Velodrome was an outdoor cycling velodrome that existed from 1970 to 2018 and was located on the east side of the Meadowbank Sports Centre on London Road in Edinburgh, Scotland.

== History ==
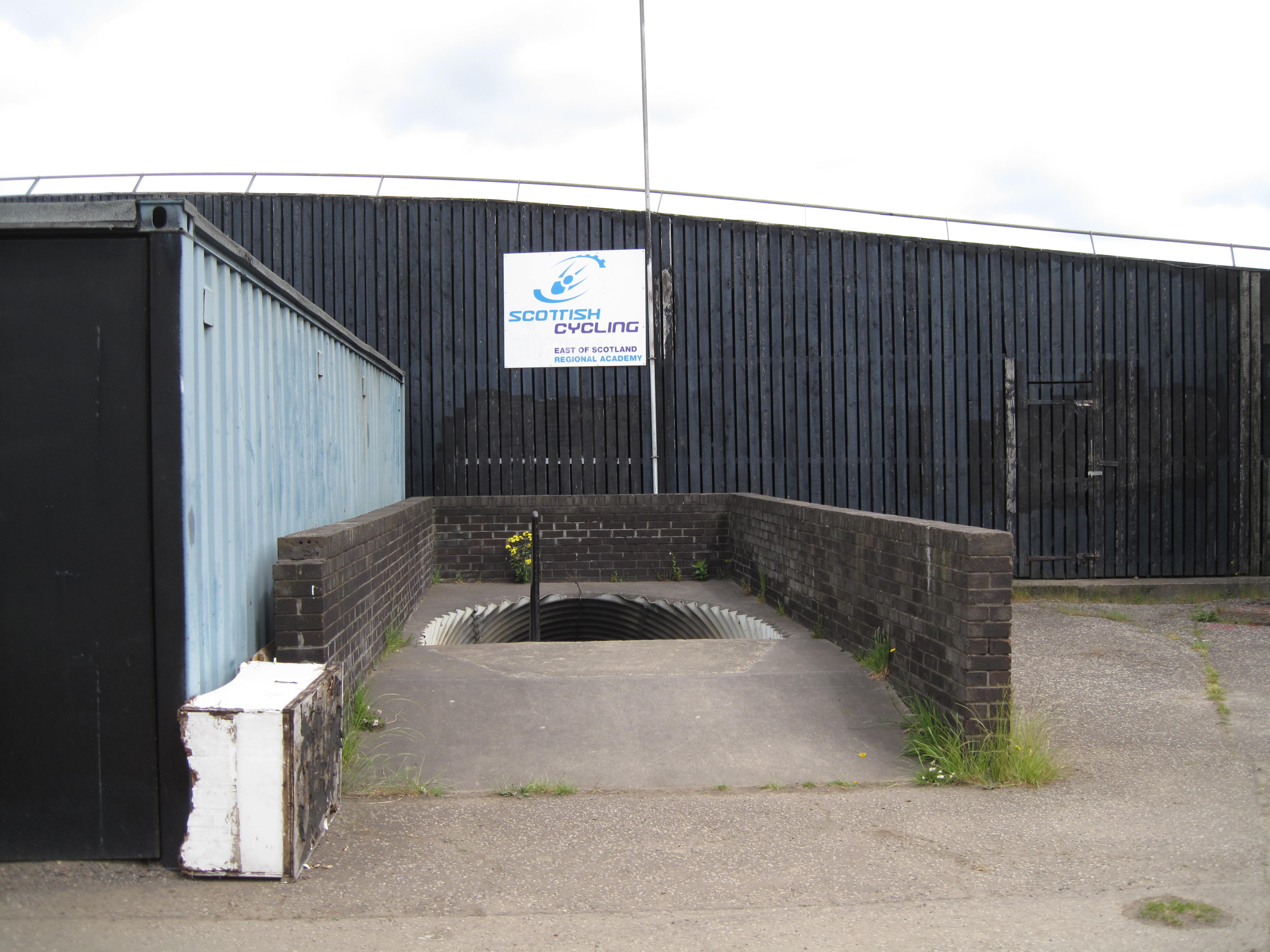
The velodrome entrance in 2015

Shortly after the 1966 British Empire and Commonwealth Games, the vote took place in Jamaica, to select the host city for the 1970 British Commonwealth Games. The successful bidder was Edinburgh, Scotland, with 18 votes beating Christchurch, New Zealand, with 11.

The sports were to be based primarily on the newly built Meadowbank Sports Centre site at a cost of £2.8 million. A velodrome was built at the cost of £90,000 on the site.

The track was 250 metres in circumference and was six metres in width with 45 degree banking. Designed by Ron Webb and built by Schermann, it was made from African hardwood one-inch strips.

The velodrome opened on Saturday 2 May 1970 with the purpose being a test event for the forthcoming Commonwealth Games cycling events in July 1970.

When Edinburgh hosted the 1986 Commonwealth Games, the velodrome was once again selected for the cycling events.

When Glasgow hosted the 2014 Commonwealth Games, a new indoor velodrome was constructed, which was partly responsible for the demise of the Meadowbank Velodrome. The outdoor track suffered from weather issues and closed 2 September 2017, followed by demolition one year later.
