= John Dyer (cyclist) =

Welsh cyclist

Personal information
- Nationality: British (Welsh)
- Born: c.1938 Wales

Sport
- Sport: cycling
- Event(s): Track and Road
- Club: Porth and District Cycling Club; Abercynon Road Club

John Dyer (born c.1938) is a former racing cyclist from Wales, who competed at the 1966 British Empire and Commonwealth Games (now Commonwealth Games).

== Biography ==
Dyer started cycling at the age of 13 and was a member of the Porth and District Cycling Club.

In 1964, Dyer, a measuring clerk at the NCB Collieries in Parc Cywparc by profession, won the Welsh quarter-mile and 5 miles championships. Dyer was also the 1966 Welsh sprint champion

He represented the 1966 Welsh team at the 1966 British Empire and Commonwealth Games in Kingston, Jamaica, participating in three events during the cycling programme. He competed in the scratch, sprint and time trial

During 1967, he was living at Treherbert and finished third in the Manx Grand Prix but in August 1967 despite being chosen to lead the Welsh team at the Welsh International Games he decided to announce his retirement.
