= Eddie Smart =

Welsh racing cyclist (1946–2000)

Personal information
- Born: 23 August 1946 Cardiff, Wales
- Died: 6 February 2000 (aged 53) Berkshire, England

Cycling career
- Sport: Cycling
- Disciplines: Road and Track
- Role: Rider

Amateur team
- Polytechnic CC; Cardiff Byways RC

Edward Charles Smart (23 August 1946 – 6 February 2000) was a cyclist from Wales, who competed at the 1966 British Empire and Commonwealth Games (now Commonwealth Games).

== Biography ==
Smart represented the 1966 Welsh team at the 1966 British Empire and Commonwealth Games in Kingston, Jamaica, participating in the scratch, sprint, road race and time trial events.

Smart ran a garage on Maindy Road, opposite the cycle track. Smart coached young riders and was the Welsh Cycling Union's track co-ordinator and member of the Maindy track league committee.

Steve Jones and Eddie Smart were helpers at the Junior Tour of Wales. They died in a car accident on the M4 in Berkshire. John Richards, the race's organizer a shield to them for the best Welsh rider. It is awarded annually at the Junior Tour of Wales. The Eddie Smart Memorial Fund was set up to refurbish the track.

== Palmarès ==
15th Kilo, Commonwealth Games
