= Vernon Stauble =

Trinidad cyclist

Personal information
- Born: 1 February 1950 (age 76) Port of Spain, Trinidad and Tobago

Cycling career
- Sport: Cycling

Vernon Ronald Stauble (born 1 February 1950) is a former Trinidad cyclist. He competed at the 1968 Summer Olympics and the 1972 Summer Olympics.
