= Karl Barton =

British cyclist (born 1937)

Personal information
- Born: 17 July 1937 (age 89) Birmingham, England
- Height: 167 cm (5 ft 6 in)
- Weight: 68 kg (150 lb)

Cycling career
- Sport: Cycling

Amateur team
- Coventry Road Club
Medal record
Cycling
Representing England
British Empire & Commonwealth Games
Silver medal – second place	1958 Cardiff	1,000m Match Sprint
Silver medal – second place	1962 Perth	1,000m Match Sprint

Karl Edward James Barton (born 17 July 1937) is a British former cyclist. He competed at the 1960 Summer Olympics and the 1964 Summer Olympics.

== Biography ==
In addition to his Olympic Games appearances, He also represented the England team and won a silver medal in the Track 1,000m match sprint at the 1958 British Empire and Commonwealth Games in Cardiff, Wales.

Four years later he won another silver medal in the 1,000m match sprint at the 1962 British Empire and Commonwealth Games in Perth, Western Australia.

Barton was a three times British track champion, winning the British National Individual Sprint Championships in 1962, 1963 and 1964.
