= Peter Buckley (cyclist) =

Personal information
- Full name: Peter Buckley
- Born: 2 August 1944 Douglas, Isle of Man
- Died: 4 July 1969 Leeds

Cycling career
- Sport: Cycling
- Discipline: Road
- Role: Rider

Amateur teams
- Manx Road Club
- Oldham Century Road Club
Medal record
Men's road cycling
Representing Isle of Man
British Empire and Commonwealth Games
Gold medal – first place	1966 Kingston	Road race

Peter Buckley (2 August 1944 – 4 July 1969) was a Manx and British racing cyclist. He was a gold medalist in the road race at the 1966 British Empire and Commonwealth Games in Kingston, Jamaica.

On 2 July 1969 Buckley was seriously injured in an accident in Hebden Bridge whilst training, when he hit a loose dog. He died two days later in Chapel Allerton Hospital in Leeds because of severe head injuries. The Peter Buckley Trophy was named in his honour, and is presented annually to the winner of the British junior national road race series winner.

== Palmarès ==
1966
1st Road race, British Empire and Commonwealth Games

1967
1st Premier Calendar series
3rd Stage 2b, Milk Race, Malvern (GBR)
2nd Stage 6b, Milk Race, New Brighton (GBR)
3rd Stage 1 Tour de Namur, Floreffe (BEL)
2nd Tour de Namur, Meux (BEL)
2nd British National Road Race Championships, Amateur

1968
1st Circuit de Saône-et-Loire (FRA)
2nd Tour de la Yonne (FRA)

1969
3rd Milk Race

1st Stage 6b, Milk Race, Caernarfon
2nd Stage 9, Milk Race, Nottingham
