= Charlie McCoy (cyclist) =

British cyclist

Charly McCoy
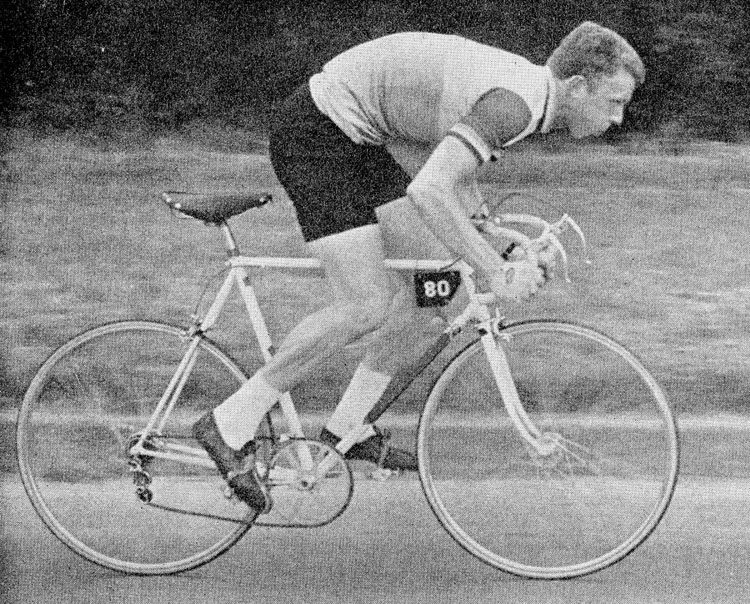

Personal information
- Born: 14 December 1937 (age 88) Liverpool, England
- Height: 187 cm (6 ft 2 in)
- Weight: 75 kg (165 lb)

Cycling career
- Sport: Cycling
- Disciplines: Road racing Track racing
- Rider type: Time trialist Individual pursuit Team pursuit

Amateur team
- Melling Wheelers (Liverpool)

Charles McCoy (born 14 December 1937) is a former British cycling record holder and Olympian.

== Cycling career ==
McCoy competed in the team pursuit at the 1960 Summer Olympics.

McCoy represented the 1962 English Team at the 1962 British Empire and Commonwealth Games in Perth, Australia, participating in the 4,000 metres pursuit event.

He rode for his local Amateur team, Melling Wheelers and was coached by Eddie Soens. He broke the British 25 mile Time Trial record in 1961, finishing with a time of 55m 01s.
