= Ronald Jonker =

Australian cyclist (born 1944)

Personal information
- Born: 14 December 1944 (age 81)

Cycling career
- Sport: Cycling

Ronald Jonker (born 14 December 1944) is an Australian former cyclist. He competed in the individual road race at the 1968 Summer Olympics.
