= Maxwell Langshaw =

Australian cyclist (born 1939)

Personal information
- Born: c.1941 Sydney, Australia
Medal record
Track cycling
Representing Australia
British Empire and Commonwealth Games
| Gold medal – first place | 1962 Perth | Men's Pursuit |

Maxwell Langshaw (born c.1941) was an Australian cyclist who won a gold medal at the British Empire and Commonwealth Games (now Commonwealth Games).

== Biography ==
Langshaw represented the 1962 Australian team at the 1962 British Empire and Commonwealth Games in his home country of Perth, Australia, where he won the gold medal in the individual pursuit race.

Langshaw was a flying instructor in Sydney for five years and then worked for an airline company in Melbourne before moving to Sunbury in 1979. He retired from flying in 2006.
