= Jersey at the 1962 British Empire and Commonwealth Games =

- CGF code: JER
- CGA: Commonwealth Games Association of Jersey
- Website: cgaj.org

in Perth, Western Australia
- Competitors: 13 in 4 sports
- Flag bearers: Opening: Closing:
- Medals Ranked =17thth: Gold 0 Silver 0 Bronze 1 Total 1

British Empire and Commonwealth Games appearances
- 1958; 1962; 1966; 1970; 1974; 1978; 1982; 1986; 1990; 1994; 1998; 2002; 2006; 2010; 2014; 2018; 2022; 2026; 2030

Jersey competed at the 1962 British Empire and Commonwealth Games in Perth, Western Australia, from 22 November to 1 December 1962. In their second appearance at the Games, Jersey had 13 competitors compete in four sports.

== Medalists ==
Medal	Name	Sport	Event	Date
Bronze	Albert Turmel	Boxing	Men's welterweight	
