= Ray Bilney =

Australian cyclist (born 1945)

Personal information
- Full name: Raymond Victor Bilney
- Born: 2 November 1945 (age 80)

Cycling career
- Sport: Cycling
Medal record
Representing AUS
Men's cycling
Commonwealth Games
Silver medal – second place	1970 Edinburgh	Men's Road Race

Raymond Victor Bilney (born 2 November 1945) is an Australian former cyclist. He competed in the individual road race at the 1964 Summer Olympics. He was the Australian senior road champion for three years running, 1964 to 1966.
