= Wes Mason (cyclist) =

English cyclist

Personal information
- Nationality: British (English)
- Born: 26 June 1941 (age 85) Sheffield, England

Sport
- Sport: Cycling
- Event: Road
Medal record
Cycling
Representing England
British Empire & Commonwealth Games
Gold medal – first place	1962 Perth	road race

Wesley Mason (born 26 June 1941), is a male former cyclist who competed for England.

== Biography ==
Mason represented England at the 1962 British Empire and Commonwealth Games in Perth, Western Australia, participating in the road race and won the gold medal.

He was a professional rider from 1965 until 1971.
