= Cycling at the 1962 British Empire and Commonwealth Games =

- Venue: Track:Lake Monger Velodrome, Leederville; Road:Kings Park
- Dates: 22 November to 1 December 1962

Cycling at the 1962 British Empire and Commonwealth Games was the sixth appearance of Cycling at the Commonwealth Games. The events were held from 22 November to 1 December 1962.

The track events took place at Lake Monger Velodrome in Leederville, Western Australia, a 333 metre 37 degree banked track, while the road race consisted of 40 laps of a 3-mile circuit of Kings Park, Western Australia, although Pathé News states 117 miles.

Australia topped the cycling medal table, winning four of the five gold medals available.

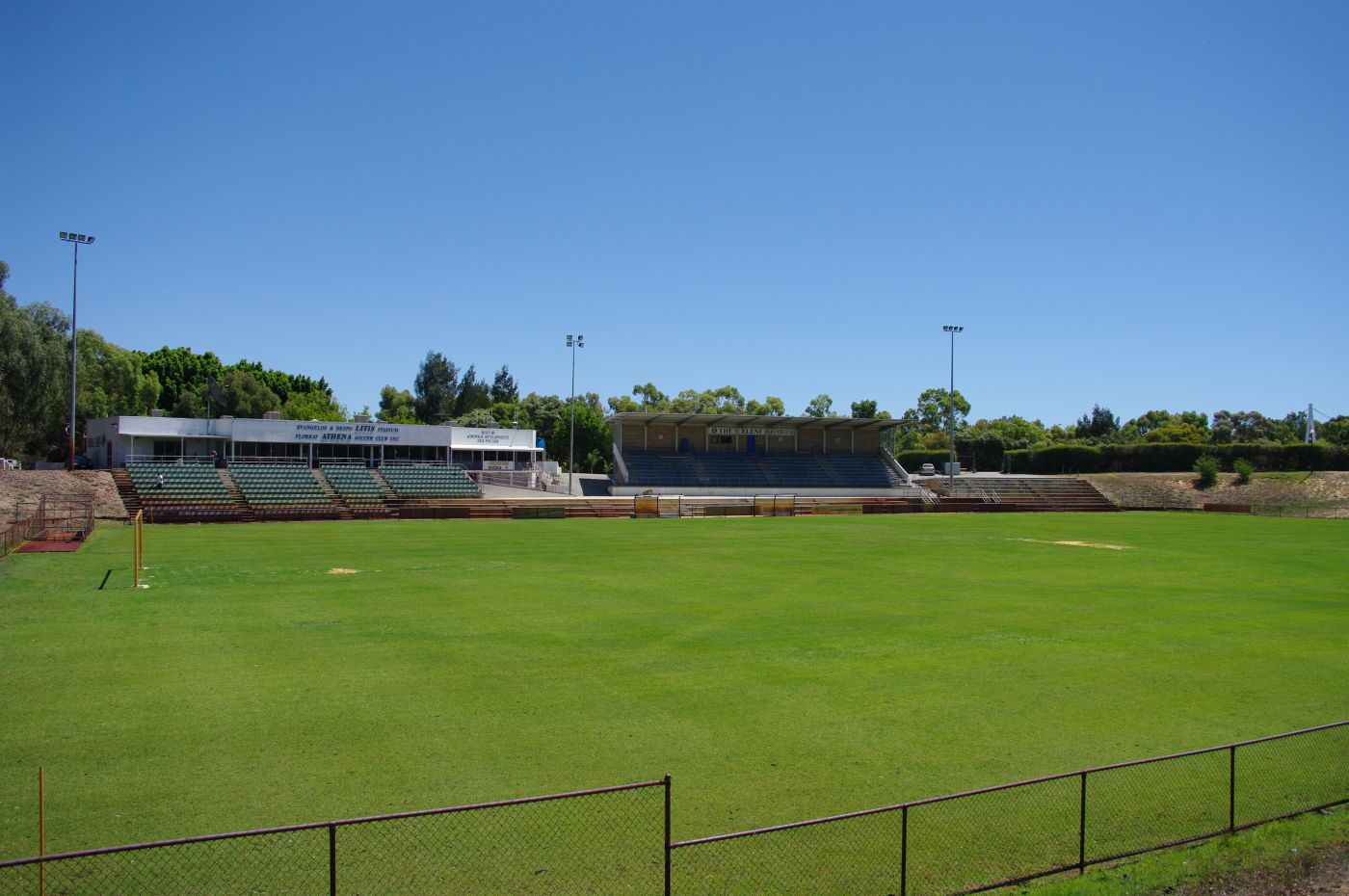
The Lake Monger Velodrome hosted the cycling. Part of the banking can still be seen

== Medal table ==
* Host nation (Australia)

Medals won by nation with totals, ranked by number of golds—sortable
Rank	Nation	Gold	Silver	Bronze	Total
1	Australia	4	2	1	7
2	England	1	1	3	5
3	New Zealand	0	2	1	3
Totals (3 entries)		5	5	5	15

== Medal winners ==
Event	Gold	Silver	Bronze
Road Race	Wes Mason (ENG)	Anthony Walsh (NZL)	Laurie Byers (NZL)
Time Trial	Peter Bartels (AUS)	Ian Chapman (AUS)	Roger Whitfield (ENG)
Sprint	Tom Harrison (AUS)	Karl Barton (ENG)	Ian Browne (AUS)
Individual Pursuit	Maxwell Langshaw (AUS)	Richard Hine (AUS)	Harry Jackson (ENG)
10 Miles Scratch	Doug Adams (AUS)	Warren Johnston (NZL)	John Clarey (ENG)

== See also ==
- List of Commonwealth Games medallists in cycling
