= Ian Thomson (cyclist) =

Scottish cyclist

Personal information
- Nationality: British (Scottish)
- Born: Scotland

Sport
- Sport: Cycling
- Events: Track and Road
- Club: Velo Club Stella, Glasgow

Ian Thomson is a former racing cyclist from Scotland, who represented Scotland at the British Empire Games (now Commonwealth Games).

== Biography ==
Thomson, born in Scotland, was a member of the Velo Club Stella of Glasgow. He won the prestigious Tour de Trossachs on four occasions including breaking the course record in 1962.

He competed in the 1961 "Milk to Stamina" road race, a 136 miles race and the longest ever to be held in Scotland to that point and was a national hill climb champion.

At the 1962 British Empire and Commonwealth Games in Perth, Australia, he represented the 1962 Scottish team and participated in the road race and scratch events.
