= Bob Addy (cyclist) =

British cyclist (born 1941)

Personal information
- Born: 24 January 1941 (age 85) Northwood, London, England
- Height: 191 cm (6 ft 3 in)
- Weight: 76 kg (168 lb)

Cycling career
- Sport: Cycling

Amateur team
- Hemel Hempstead CC

Robert Charles Addy (born 24 January 1941) is a former cyclist from England. He competed at the 1964 Summer Olympics.

== Biography ==
Addy represented the 1962 England team in the road race at the 1962 British Empire and Commonwealth Games in Perth, Western Australia.

Addy was the 1963 British National Road Champion and represented Great Britain in over 100 races including the Tour de France.

At the 1964 Olympic Games in Tokyo, he participated in the 100 km team time trial event.

He retired to Australia.
