= John Clarey =

British cyclist

Personal information
- Born: 4 October 1940 (age 86) Woolwich, London, England

Cycling career
- Sport: Cycling
- Role: Rider

Amateur team
- Cambrian Wheelers CC, London; Woolwich CC, London

John Clarey (born 4 October 1940) is a British former racing cyclist.

== Cycling career ==
Carey represented the 1962 English Team at the 1962 British Empire and Commonwealth Games in Perth, Australia, participating in the 10 miles scratch event, despite being hospitalised a few days earlier when training for the event at the velodrome.

Four years later he was selected to represent the England team again at the 1966 British Empire and Commonwealth Games in Kingston, Jamaica, where he participated in the road race event.

He was the national 10 miles champion but finished in last place in the 1968 Tour de France.

Clarey rode for Cambrian Wheelers CC in London and Woolwich CC in London.

== Major results ==
1961
1st Stage 12 Milk Race
1962
1st Stage 2 Milk Race
Commonwealth Games, Track, 10 Mile
1963
2nd British National Road Race Amateurs
1964
3rd British National Road Race Amateurs
1966
1st Lincoln Grand Prix
1968
63rd Tour de France
