= Robert Farrell (cyclist) =

Trinidad and Tobago cyclist

Personal information
- Born: 25 July 1949 (age 77) Trinidad, Trinidad and Tobago

Cycling career
- Sport: Cycling

Robert Farrell (born 25 July 1949) is a Trinidad former cyclist. He competed in the team pursuit at the 1968 Summer Olympics.
