= Doug Adams (cyclist) =

Australian cyclist (born 1939)

Personal information
- Born: 14 October 1941 Australia
- Died: 11 November 2023 Melbourne, Australia
Medal record
Track cycling
Representing Australia
British Empire and Commonwealth Games
Gold medal – first place	1962 Perth	Men's Scratch

Douglas James Adams (14 October 1941 – 11 November 2023) was an Australian cyclist who won a gold medal at the British Empire and Commonwealth Games (now Commonwealth Games).

== Biography ==
Adams represented the 1962 Australian team at the 1962 British Empire and Commonwealth Games in his home country of Perth, Australia, where he won the gold medal in the scratch race.
