= Fred Booker (cyclist) =

British cyclist

Personal information
- Nationality: British (English)
- Born: 12 July 1944 Erdington, Birmingham, England
- Died: 2006 (aged 62) Devon, England

Sport
- Sport: Cycling
- Event(s): sprint, time trial
- Club: Rover Racing CC, Birmingham
Medal record
Cycling
Representing England
British Empire & Commonwealth Games
Silver medal – second place	1966 Kingston	1,000m match sprint

Frederick James Booker (12 July 1944 – 2006), was a male cyclist who competed for England.

== Biography ==
Booker represented the England team and won a silver medal in the 1,000 metres match sprint, at the 1966 British Empire and Commonwealth Games in Kingston, Jamaica. He also competed and finished fourth in the 1 Km time trial event.

He was a four times national champion and rode for the Birmingham Rover Racing Cycling Club.
