= Malcolm McCredie =

Australian cyclist

Personal information
- Born: 3 October 1942 (age 84)

Cycling career
- Sport: Cycling

Malcolm Robert McCredie (born 3 October 1942) is a former Australian cyclist. He competed in the individual road race at the 1964 Summer Olympics.

McCredie set the fastest time in the amateur Goulburn to Sydney Classic in 1964 run in reverse direction from Milperra to Goulburn.
