= Peter Bartels =

Australian cyclist and businessman

Personal information
- Born: Peter Tasman Bartels; 4 January 1941 (age 85)

Sport
- Country: Australia
Medal record
Men's Track Cycling
Representing Australia
Commonwealth Games
Gold medal – first place	1962 Perth	Men's Time Trial

Peter Tasman Bartels, AO (born 4 January 1941) is an Australian businessman, track cyclist and sport administrator.

== Personal ==
Bartels was born on 4 January 1941 in Melbourne, Victoria. He married Marilyn Loveland and they have two sons. He attended Box Hill Grammar School.

Bartels is reported to own the coveted "VIC 1" single-digit Victorian numberplate, worth an estimated $10 million.

== Business ==
Bartels has been a successful Australian businessman. He began his corporate career at Abbott Laboratories in the 1960s and then went on to be managing director of Drug Houses of Australia. He was CEO and Managing Director of Foster's Group from 1985 to 1992. He then became CEO of Coles Myer from 1992 to 1996. In 2000, resigned as Chairman of Voicenet after only 2 months. In 2005, he became a Non-Executive Director and Chairman of Aus Bio Limited and Starpharma Pooled Development.

He was a Director of Melbourne Business School and member of the Business Council of Australia for eight years.

== Cycling ==
As a track cyclist, he won several Australian titles.

1958 Sydney
Junior 1000m Sprint
Junior 500m Time Trial

1959 Perth
Senior 1000m Time Trial 1st

1960 Adelaide
Senior 1000m Time Trial 2nd
Senior 1000m Sprint 3rd

1961 Launceston
Senior 1000m Time Trial 1st
Senior 1000m Sprint 1st

1962 Sydney
Senior 1000m Time Trial 1st

.

At the 1962 Commonwealth Games in Perth, Western Australia, he won the gold medal in the Men's 1000m Time Trial.

== Sport administration ==
Bartels has played as important role in Australian cycling administration over 20 years. He has held the positions of Patron, Vice President and Board Member with the Australian Cycling Federation. He was also the Australian and Oceania delegate to the Union Cycliste Internationale.

In 1997, he was appointed Chairman of the Australian Sports Commission and departed in 2008. Whilst he was Chairman, he was responsible for the last three years of the successful Olympic Athlete Program. This program resulted in Australia recording its greatest performance at a Summer Olympics, winning 58 medals and finishing 4th on the medal tally. As Chairman, he lobbied the government for funding and in 2001 the Australian Government released its new sport policy called Backing Australia's Sporting Ability. This policy injected $161.6 million into Australian sport over four years. He was also the Chairman of the Commonwealth Heads of Government Committee for Sport.

He was a Director of the Organising Committee of the 2006 Melbourne Commonwealth Games. He was a Director of the Australian Grand Prix Corporation from 2001 to 2006.

== Awards and honours ==
- 1988 - Sir Charles McGrath Award, Australian Marketing Institute
- 2001 - Centenary Medal for outstanding service to Australian sport and sports administration
- 2002 – Associate Inductee Sport Australia Hall of Fame
- 2004 - Officer of the Order of Australia (AO) for service to the community as a sports administrator, particularly in the areas of strategic and budgetary planning and sports development and promotion, and to the business sector
