= Jack Johnston (cyclist) =

Northern Irish cyclist

Personal information
- Nationality: Northern Irish
- Born: c.1941

Sport
- Sport: Cycling
- Events: Track and Road
- Club: Cyprus CC

Jack Johnston (born c.1941) is a former racing cyclist from Northern Ireland, who represented Northern Ireland at the British Empire and Commonwealth Games (now Commonwealth Games).

== Biography ==
Johnston was a member of the Cyprus Cycling Club and was the outstanding performer in the 1960 season opening King's Moss 255.

He maintained his form throughout 1960, coming second in the national mass start championship A plumber by profession from Castleagh Road, Belfast, he won the 75 mile Dublin massed start in March 1961 and then clocked the fastest ever time for 25 miles in Ireland.

Initially listed as an Empire Games reserve, he was one of three athletes to be added to the team in September 1962.

At the 1962 British Empire and Commonwealth Games in Perth, Australia, he represented the 1962 Northern Irish team and participated in the road race and scratch events. He finished just outside the medals in the road race finishing fifth.
