= Anthony Walsh (cyclist) =

New Zealand cyclist

Personal information
- Full name: Anthony Walsh

Cycling career
- Sport: Cycling
- Discipline: Road
- Role: Rider
Medal record
Men's road bicycle racing
Representing New Zealand
Commonwealth Games
Silver medal – second place	1962 Perth	Road Race

Anthony Walsh, known also as Tony Walsh, is a former racing cyclist from New Zealand.

He won the silver medal in the men's road race at the 1962 British Empire and Commonwealth Games.

Walsh was awarded life membership to the Moturoa Association Football Club of New Plymouth in 1992.
