= Mel Davies =

Welsh cyclist

Personal information
- Nationality: Welsh/Australian
- Born: c.1936 Wales

Sport
- Sport: Cycling
- Event(s): Track and Road
- Club: Port Talbot Wheelers

Melville John Davies (born c.1936) is a former racing cyclist from Wales, who represented Wales at the British Empire Games (now Commonwealth Games).

== Biography ==
In 1962, Davies, a salesman from Port Talbot at the time, was named in the Welsh national team for the Easter Senior Service International Tour of Northern Ireland. He raced five years in France prior to the event and was a member of the Port Talbot Wheelers.

At the 1962 British Empire and Commonwealth Games in Perth, Australia, he represented the 1962 Welsh team and participated in the pursuit, scratch and road race events. He finished fourth in the 10 miles scratch race after leading until the last few yards to the finish line.

After the games, Davies emigrated to Perth in Australia and lectured at the University of Western Australia and was president of the West Coast Masters.
