= Roger Whitfield =

British cyclist (born 1943)

Personal information
- Born: 29 December 1943 (age 82)
- Height: 173 cm (5 ft 8 in)
- Weight: 73 kg (161 lb)

Cycling career
- Sport: Cycling
Medal record
Cycling
Representing England
British Empire & Commonwealth Games
Bronze medal – third place	1962 Perth	1 km time trial

Roger Cyril Whitfield (born 29 December 1943) is a former British cyclist.

== Cycling career ==
He competed in the 1000m time trial at the 1964 Summer Olympics.

He represented the 1962 English Team at the 1962 British Empire and Commonwealth Games in Perth, Australia, participating in the sprint and time trial events.

Whitfield was twice British track champion, winning the British National Individual Sprint Championships in 1965 and 1969.
