= Harry Jackson (cyclist) =

British cyclist

Personal information
- Born: 26 May 1941 (age 85) Monton, Manchester, England
- Height: 180 cm (5 ft 11 in)
- Weight: 73 kg (161 lb)

Cycling career
- Sport: Cycling

Amateur team
- Portsmouth North End CC
Medal record
Cycling
Representing England
British Empire & Commonwealth Games
Bronze medal – third place	1962 Perth	4000m pursuit

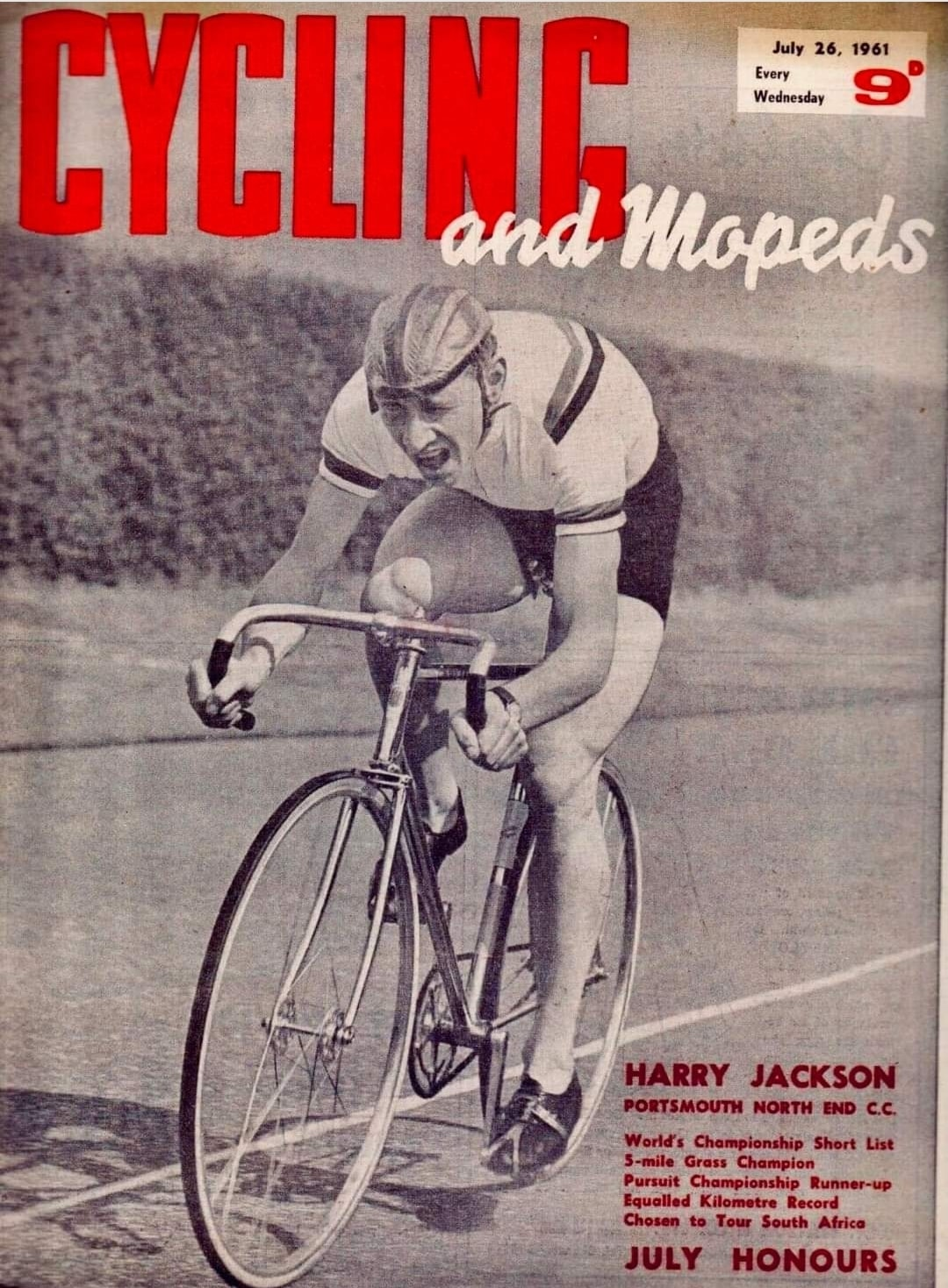
1961 Harry Jackson - Cycling and Moped Cover

Harry Kenneth Jackson (born 26 May 1941) is a retired British cyclist who competed at the 1964 Summer Olympics and the 1968 Summer Olympics.

== Biography ==
Jackson represented the 1962 English Team at the 1962 British Empire and Commonwealth Games in Perth, Australia, participating in the scratch, time trial and pursuit events.

Four years later he represented England in the pursuit again but finished in fourth place, at the 1966 British Empire and Commonwealth Games in Kingston, Jamaica.

Harry joined Portsmouth North End Cycling Club (PNECC) in May 1955 and raced extensively at Alexandra Park Cycling Track, Portsmouth. After national success, and aged just 20 Harry was awarded Honorary Life Membership by Portsmouth North End Cycling Club in January 1962. Since 2020 Harry has been the vice-president of Portsmouth North End Cycling Club and continues to ride weekly.
