= Richard Hine =

Australian cyclist (born 1939)

Personal information
- Born: 11 December 1939 (age 86)
- Height: 169 cm (5 ft 7 in)
- Weight: 59 kg (130 lb)

Cycling career
- Sport: Cycling
- Disciplines: Track and road cyclist
Medal record
Track cycling
Representing Australia
British Empire and Commonwealth Games
Silver medal – second place	1962 Perth	Men's Individual Pursuit
Bronze medal – third place	1966 Kingston	Men's Individual Pursuit
Bronze medal – third place	1966 Kingston	Men's Time Trial

Richard John Hine (born 11 December 1939) is a former Australian cyclist. He competed in the individual pursuit at the 1964 Summer Olympics.
