= Litis Stadium =

Stadium in Western Australia

E & D Litis Stadium
- The Velodrome
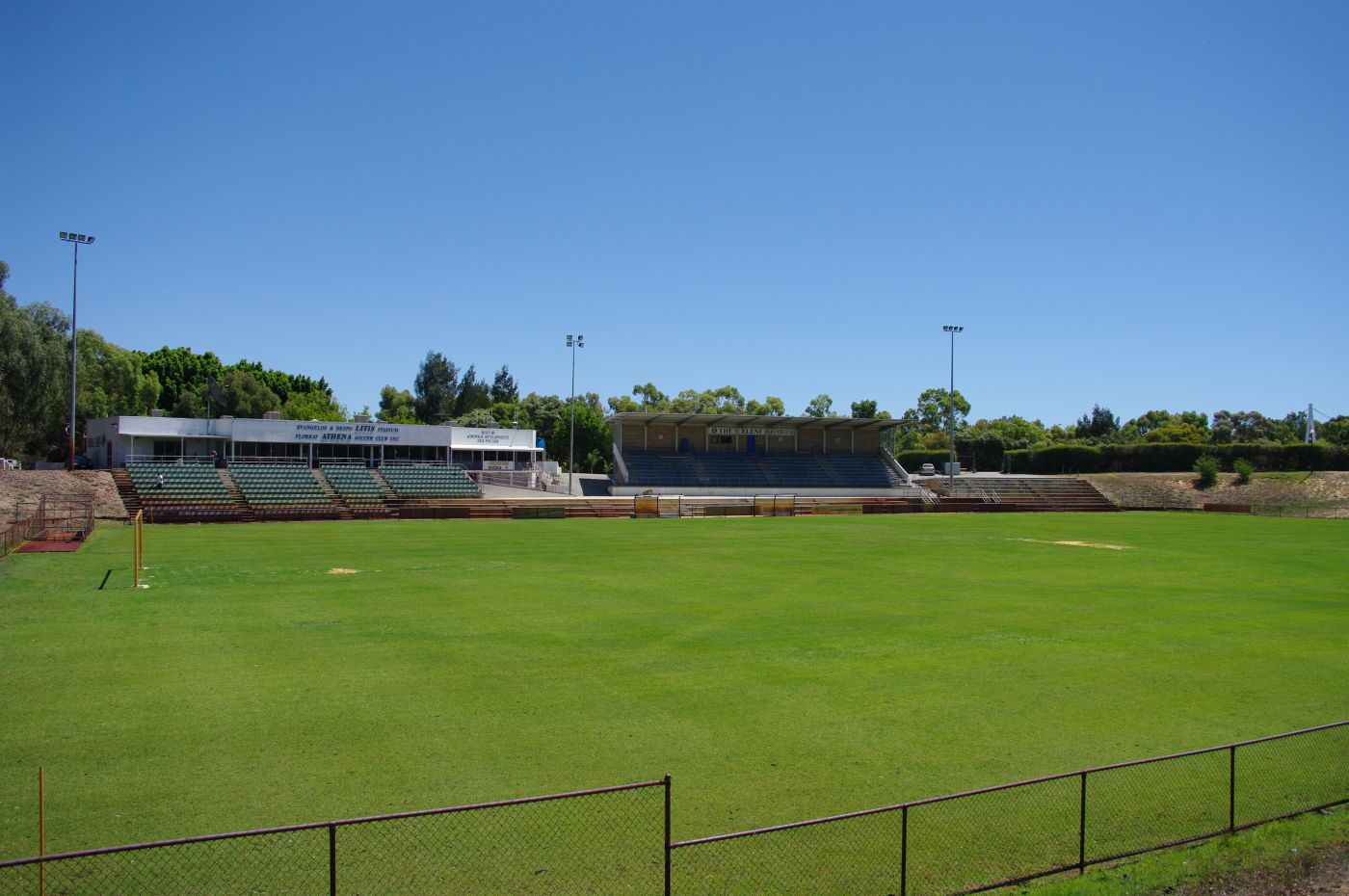
- Interactive map of E & D Litis Stadium
- Former names: Lake Monger Velodrome
- Location: Leederville, Western Australia
- Coordinates: 31.927243°S 115.833331°E
- Owner: City of Vincent
- Capacity: 5,000
- Surface: Grass
- Scoreboard: Electronic

Construction
- Built: 1959
- Renovated: 1998

Tenants
- Floreat Athena FC (1985-present); Cycling at the 1962 British Empire and Commonwealth Games

E & D Litis Stadium originally known as the Lake Monger Velodrome or Velodrome, is a stadium in Leederville, Western Australia. The stadium is part of the City of Vincent's Britannia Reserve, which is one of the city's most popular sporting venues and is the home ground of the football association team Floreat Athena FC.

== History ==
Originally constructed in 1959 and officially opened on 14 March 1959 as a velodrome for the 1962 British Empire and Commonwealth Games.

The velodrome was a 333-metre, 37 degree banked track.

The Floreat Athena Football Club moved to the velodrome in 1985 and is the sole lessee of the stadium. The stadium is also the venue for the annual Community World Cup, which is organised by the Latin American Association of WA.

In 1998, the stadium was renamed the E & D Litis Stadium for sponsorship reasons, after Evangelos and Despo Litis donated $150,000 to the Floreat Athena club.
