= 1970 British Commonwealth Games =

Multi-sport event in Edinburgh, Scotland

IX British Commonwealth Games
- Host city: Edinburgh, Scotland
- Nations: 42
- Athletes: 1,744 (inc. officials)
- Events: 121 events in 10 sports
- Opening: 16 July 1970
- Closing: 25 July 1970
- Opened by: Prince Philip, Duke of Edinburgh
- Athlete's Oath: Crawford Fairbrother
- Queen's Baton Final Runner: Jim Alder
- Main venue: Meadowbank Stadium

The 1970 British Commonwealth Games were held in Edinburgh, Scotland, from 16 to 25 July 1970. This was the first time the name British Commonwealth Games was adopted, the first time metric units rather than imperial units were used in all events, and also the first time the event was held in Scotland.

Also, the event saw the first unique Games trademark logo: an emblem showing the Games emblem intertwined with a St Andrews Cross and a thistle. The event was followed by the 1970 Commonwealth Paraplegic Games for wheelchair athletes. The 1970 Games was one of the most successful in the history of the event.

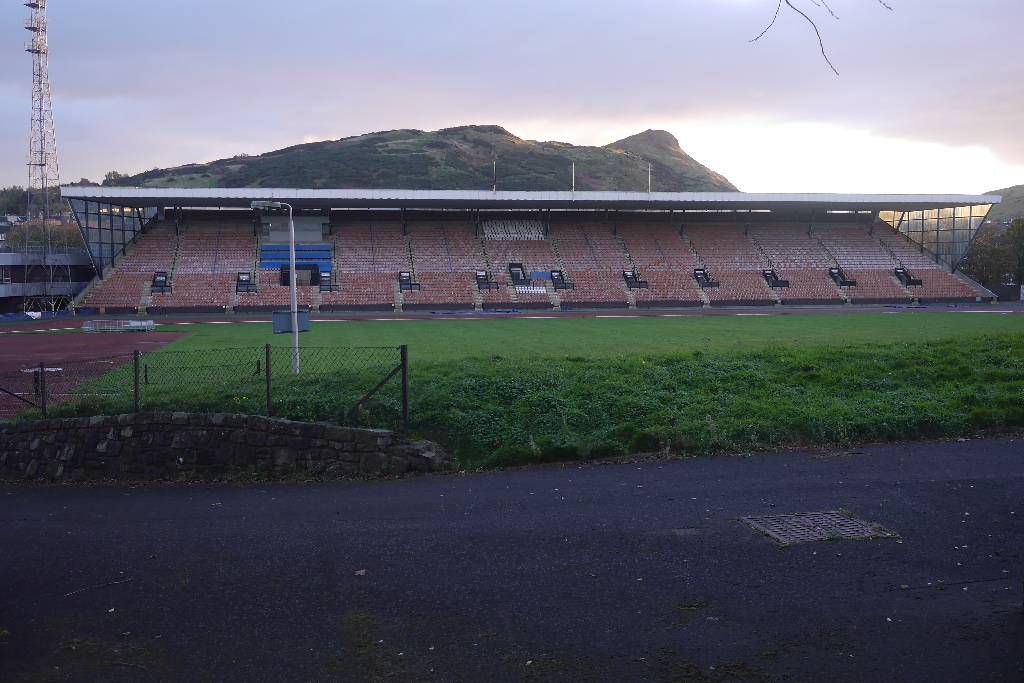
The Meadowbank Stadium

== Host selection ==
In August 1966, the bid vote was held in Jamaica. The successful bidder was Edinburgh, Scotland with 18 votes beating Christchurch, New Zealand, with 11. In 1967, an appeal fund was launched, aiming to raise £200,000 towards the cost of running the games.

1970 British Commonwealth Games bidding results
City	Country	Votes
Edinburgh	Scotland	18
Christchurch	New Zealand	11

== Participating teams ==
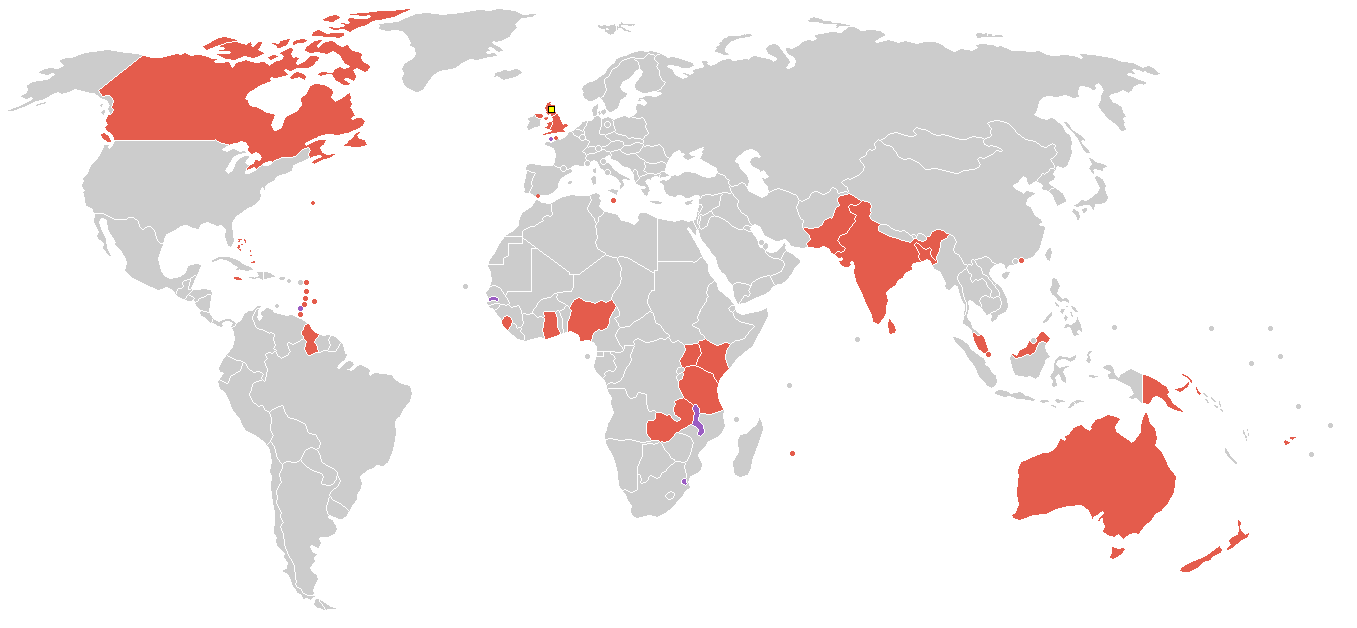
Countries that participated

42 teams were represented at the 1970 Games.
(Teams competing for the first time are shown in bold).

- Antigua
- Australia
- Bahamas
- Barbados
- Bermuda
- Canada
- Ceylon
- Dominica
- England
- Fiji
- Ghana
- Gibraltar
- Grenada: first appearance
- Guernsey: first appearance
- Guyana
- Hong Kong
- India
- Isle of Man
- Jamaica
- Jersey
- Kenya
- Malawi: first appearance
- Malaysia
- Malta
- Mauritius
- New Zealand
- Nigeria
- Northern Ireland
- Pakistan
- (Papua New Guinea) Papua and New Guinea
- Saint Lucia
- Saint Vincent and the Grenadines
- Scotland **(host)**
- Sierra Leone
- Singapore
- Swaziland: first appearance
- Tanzania
- The Gambia: first appearance
- Trinidad and Tobago
- Uganda
- Wales
- Zambia

== Venues ==
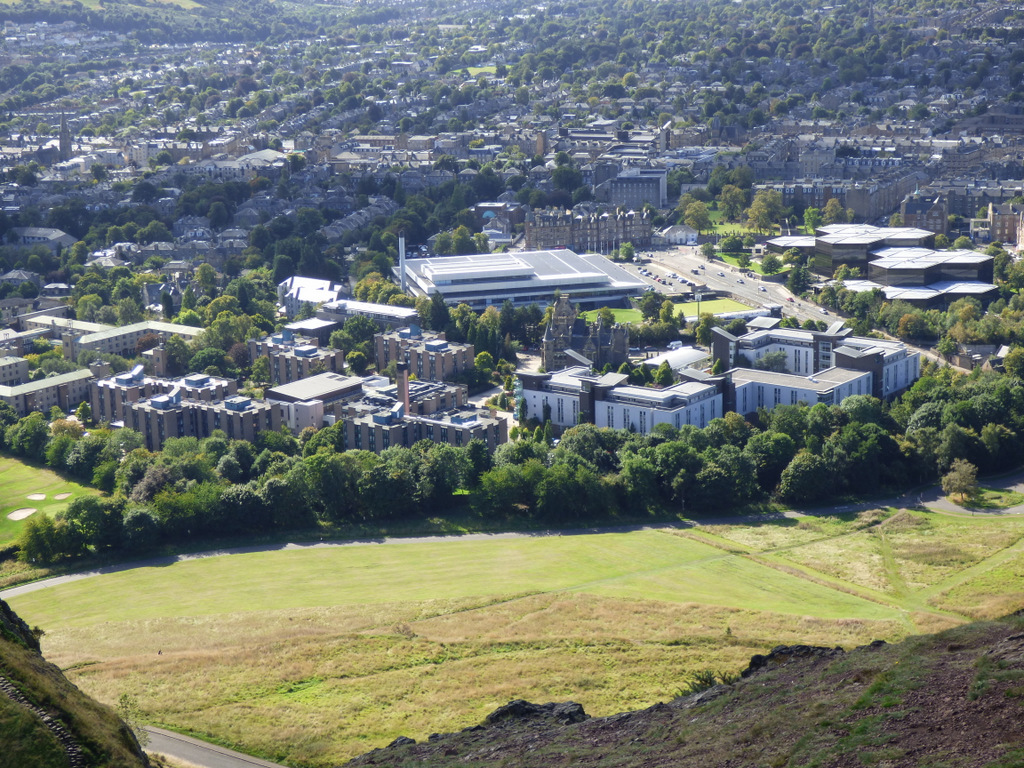
Pollock Halls of Residence and the Royal Commonwealth Pool

The Meadowbank Sports Centre was built for the 1970 Commonwealth Games, at a cost of £2.8 million. It was opened by Prince Edward, Duke of Kent on 2 May 1970. Adjacent to the main stadium were three sports halls for the fencing, badminton and wrestling competitions and a velodrome built at the cost of £90,000.

- Athletes' Village – Pollock Halls of Residence
- Athletics, opening and closing ceremonies - Meadowbank Sports Centre
- Badminton – Meadowbank Sports Centre
- Boxing – Murrayfield Ice Rink
- Cycling (track) – Meadowbank Velodrome
- Cycling (road) – Holyrood Park 102 miles (31 circuits)
- Diving – Royal Commonwealth Pool
- Fencing – Meadowbank Sports Centre
- Lawn bowls - Balgreen Bowling Club
- Swimming – Royal Commonwealth Pool
- Weightlifting - Leith Town Hall
- Wrestling – Meadowbank Sports Centre

== Medal table ==
* Host nation (Scotland)

Medals won by country
Rank	Nation	Gold	Silver	Bronze	Total
1	Australia	36	24	22	82
2	England	27	25	32	84
3	Canada	18	24	24	66
4	Scotland*	6	8	11	25
5	Kenya	5	3	6	14
6	India	5	3	4	12
7	Pakistan	4	3	2	9
8	Jamaica	4	2	1	7
9	Uganda	3	3	1	7
10	Northern Ireland	3	1	5	9
11	New Zealand	2	6	6	14
12	Wales	2	6	4	12
13	Ghana	2	3	2	7
14	Nigeria	2	0	0	2
15	Malaysia	1	1	1	3
16	British Hong Kong	1	0	0	1
17	Trinidad and Tobago	0	4	3	7
18	Zambia	0	2	2	4
19	Singapore	0	1	1	2
20	Barbados	0	1	0	1
20	Tanzania	0	1	0	1
22	Fiji	0	0	1	1
22	Guyana	0	0	1	1
22	Isle of Man	0	0	1	1
22	Malawi	0	0	1	1
22	Saint Vincent	0	0	1	1
22	The Gambia	0	0	1	1
Totals (27 entries)		**121**	**121**	**133**	**375**

== Sports ==
- Aquatics
  - Diving ()
  - Swimming ()
- Athletics ()
- Badminton ()
- Boxing ()
- Cycling ()
- Fencing ()
- Lawn bowls ()
- Weightlifting ()
- Wrestling ()

Preceded by **Kingston**	**British Commonwealth Games**; Edinburgh; **IX British Commonwealth Games**	Succeeded by **Christchurch**
