= Swimming at the 1963 Pan American Games – Women's 100 metre backstroke =

Women's 100 metre backstroke at the 1963 Pan American Games
- Venue: -

Medalists
Gold medal	Nina Harmer	United States
Silver medal	Cathy Ferguson	United States
Bronze medal	Eileen Weir	Canada

The women's 100 metre backstroke competition of the swimming events at the 1963 Pan American Games took place on April. The last Pan American Games champion was Carin Cone of US.

This race consisted of two lengths of the pool, all in backstroke.

== Results ==
All times are in minutes and seconds.

KEY:	q	Fastest non-qualifiers	Q	Qualified	GR	Games record	NR	National record	PB	Personal best	SB	Seasonal best

=== Final ===
The final was held on April.

Rank	Name	Nationality	Time	Notes
1st place, gold medalist(s)	Nina Harmer	United States	1:11.5	
2nd place, silver medalist(s)	Cathy Ferguson	United States	1:13.1	
3rd place, bronze medalist(s)	Eileen Weir	Canada	1:14.5	
4	Anneliese Rockenbach	Venezuela	1:15.1	
5	Lusiana Rubie	Argentina	1:17.7	
6	Mary Stewart	Canada	1:19.4	
7	-	-	-	
8	-	-	-	
