= Swimming at the 1963 Pan American Games – Women's 100 metre butterfly =

Women's 100 metre butterfly at the 1963 Pan American Games
- Venue: -

Medalists
Gold medal	Kathy Ellis	United States
Silver medal	Mary Stewart	Canada
Bronze medal	Kim Worley	United States

The women's 100 metre butterfly competition of the swimming events at the 1963 Pan American Games took place on April. The last Pan American Games champion was Becky Collins of US.

This race consisted of two lengths of the pool, all in butterfly.

== Results ==
All times are in minutes and seconds.

KEY:	q	Fastest non-qualifiers	Q	Qualified	GR	Games record	NR	National record	PB	Personal best	SB	Seasonal best

=== Final ===
The final was held on April.

Rank	Name	Nationality	Time	Notes
1st place, gold medalist(s)	Kathy Ellis	United States	1:07.6	
2nd place, silver medalist(s)	Mary Stewart	Canada	1:08.9	
3rd place, bronze medalist(s)	Kim Worley	United States	1:11.6	
4	Silvia Belmar	Mexico	1:16.8	
5	Sharon Pierce	Canada	1:17.0	
6	Esther Capriles	Venezuela	1:17.7	
7	-	-	-	
8	-	-	-	
