= Swimming at the 1958 European Aquatics Championships – Women's 100 metre butterfly =

Qualification rounds of the Women's 100 metre butterfly at the 1958 European Aquatics Championships were held on 3 September. Final took place on 4 September. There were 17 competitors.

== Records ==
	Name	Nationality	Result	Place	Date
World record	Nancy Ramey	United States	1:09.6	Los Angeles	28 June 1958.
European record	Atie Voorbij	(Netherlands)	1:10.5	Rhenen	4 August 1957

There was a new record during the competition:

European Championship record	final	(Netherlands) Tineke Lagerberg	1:11.9	Budapest, Hungary	4 September

== Results ==
=== Qualifications ===
Position	Race	Name	Nationality	Result	Other
1.	1	Tineke Lagerberg	(Netherlands)	1:12.6	Q
2.	3	Atie Voorbij	(Netherlands)	1:12.9	Q
3.	2	Marta Skupilová	(Czechoslovakia)	1:14.1	Q
4.	2	Jean Oldroyd	(United Kingdom)	1:14.8	Q
5.	2	Christine Gosden	(United Kingdom)	1:15.0	Q
6.	1	Kristina Larsson	(Sweden)	1:15.3	Q
7.	1	Jutta Langenau	(East Germany)	1:15.6	Q
7.	3	Brigitta Lindquist	(Sweden)	1:15.6	Q
9.	2	Galina Kamajeva	(Soviet Union)	1:15.9	
10.	3	Renate Wrann	(East Germany)	1:16.0	
10.	3	Valentyina Poznyjak	(Soviet Union)	1:16.0	
12.	1	Mária Littomeritzky	(Hungary)	1:17.7	
13.	2	Annie Caron	(France)	1:21.7	
14.	3	Paola Saini	(Italy)	1:22.3	
15.	1	Marcela Jelínková	(Czechoslovakia)	1:22.7	
15.	2	Anna Beneck	(Italy)	1:22.7	
17.	1	Gizella Gebhardt	(Hungary)	1:23.8	

=== Final ===
Position	Line	Name	Nationality	Result	Other
Gold medal	4	Tineke Lagerberg	(Netherlands)	1:11,9	ECR
Silver medal	5	Atie Voorbij	(Netherlands)	1:12.1	
Bronze medal	3	Marta Skupilová	(Czechoslovakia)	1:14.3	
4.	2	Christine Gosden	(United Kingdom)	1:14.3	
5.	1	Jutta Langenau	(East Germany)	1:14.3	
6.	7	Kristina Larsson	(Sweden)	1:15.1	
7.	6	Jean Oldroyd	(United Kingdom)	1:15.9	
8.	8	Brigitta Lindquist	(Sweden)	1:15.9	

== Sources ==
- IX. úszó, műugró és vízilabda Európa-bajnokság. Magyar Úszó Szövetség. 1958.
