= Swimming at the 1959 Pan American Games – Women's 100 metre butterfly =

Women's 100 metre butterfly at the I959 Pan American Games
- Venue: -
- Dates: September 2 (preliminaries), September 4 (finals)

Medalists
Gold medal	Becky Collins	United States
Silver medal	Nancy Ramey	United States
Bronze medal	Molly Botkin	United States

The women's 100 metre butterfly competition of the swimming events at the 1959 Pan American Games took place on 2 September (preliminaries) and 4 September (finals). The last Pan American Games champion was Beth Whittall of Canada.

This race consisted of two lengths of the pool, all in butterfly.

== Results ==
All times are in minutes and seconds.

KEY:	q	Fastest non-qualifiers	Q	Qualified	GR	Games record	NR	National record	PB	Personal best	SB	Seasonal best

=== Heats ===
The first round was held on September 2.

Rank	Heat	Name	Nationality	Time	Notes
1	2	Nancy Ramey	United States	1:09.1	Q, WR
2	1	Becky Collins	United States	1:09.6	Q
3	2	Molly Botkin	United States	1:11.9	Q
4	1	Margareth Iwasaki	Canada	1:15.2	Q
5	1	Eulália Martinez	Mexico	1:18.9	Q
6	2	Elal Jacques	Canada	1:20.0	Q
7	2	Mary Stewart	Canada	1:22.4	Q
8	2	Miriam Andreu	El Salvador	1:22.6	Q
-	2	Marion Meyer	Brazil	1:24.6	

=== Final ===
The final was held on September 4.

Rank	Name	Nationality	Time	Notes
1st place, gold medalist(s)	Becky Collins	United States	1:09.5	
2nd place, silver medalist(s)	Nancy Ramey	United States	1:10.4	
3rd place, bronze medalist(s)	Molly Botkin	United States	1:12.3	
4	Margareth Iwasaki	Canada	1:14.8	
5	Eulália Martinez	Mexico	1:21.2	
6	Elal Jacques	Canada	1:22.2	
7	-	-	-	
8	-	-	-	
