= Swimming at the 1963 Pan American Games – Women's 4 × 100 metre medley relay =

Women's 4 × 100 metre medley relay at the 1963 Pan American Games
- Venue: -

Medalists
Gold medal	Ginny Duenkel, Cynthia Goyette, Sharon Stouder and Donna de Varona	United States
Silver medal	Eileen Weir, Marjon Wilmink, Mary Stewart and Madelaine Sevigny	Canada
Bronze medal	Anneliese Rockenbach, N.Capriles, Esther Capriles and S.Varela	Venezuela

The women's 4 × 100 metre medley relay competition of the swimming events at the 1963 Pan American Games took place on April. The defending Pan American Games champion is the United States.

== Results ==
All times are in minutes and seconds.

KEY:	q	Fastest non-qualifiers	Q	Qualified	GR	Games record	NR	National record	PB	Personal best	SB	Seasonal best

=== Final ===
The final was held on April.

Rank	Name	Nationality	Time	Notes
1st place, gold medalist(s)	Ginny Duenkel; Cynthia Goyette; Sharon Stouder; Donna de Varona	United States	4:49.1	
2nd place, silver medalist(s)	Eileen Weir; Marjon Wilmink; Mary Stewart; Madelaine Sevigny	Canada	4:52.5	
3rd place, bronze medalist(s)	Anneliese Rockenbach; N.Capriles; Esther Capriles; S.Varela	Venezuela	5:11.8	
4	Lusiana Rubie; Susana Peper; A.Marchetti; L.Hasenbein	Argentina	5:12.4	
5	M.Mercado; Margela Borja; Silvia Belmar; Maria Luísa Sousa	Mexico	5:16.7	
6	M.R.Caixeta; L.Barth; Eliana Souza Motta; Vera Maria Formiga	Brazil	5:18.6	
7	- - - -	-	-	
8	- - - -	-	-	
