= Swimming at the 1963 Pan American Games – Women's 4 × 100 metre freestyle relay =

Women's 4 × 100 metre freestyle relay at the 1963 Pan American Games
- Venue: -

Medalists
Gold medal	Elizabeth MacCleary, Donna de Varona, - and -	United States
Silver medal	Lynne Pomfret, Sharon Pierce, Eileen Weir and Mary Stewart	Canada
Bronze medal	Eliana Souza Motta, Maria Lourdes Teixeira, Ângela Maria Palioli and Vera Maria Formiga	Brazil

The women's 4 × 100 metre freestyle relay competition of the swimming events at the 1963 Pan American Games took place on April. The defending Pan American Games champion is the United States.

== Results ==
All times are in minutes and seconds.

KEY:	q	Fastest non-qualifiers	Q	Qualified	GR	Games record	NR	National record	PB	Personal best	SB	Seasonal best

=== Final ===
The final was held on April.

Rank	Name	Nationality	Time	Notes
1st place, gold medalist(s)	Elizabeth MacCleary; Donna de Varona - -	United States	4:15.7	
2nd place, silver medalist(s)	Lynne Pomfret; Sharon Pierce; Eileen Weir; Mary Stewart	Canada	4:31.7	
3rd place, bronze medalist(s)	Eliana Souza Motta; Maria Lourdes Teixeira; Ângela Maria Palioli; Vera Maria Formiga	Brazil	4:34.3	
4	Silvia Belmar; V.Ortis; M.Paoli; Maria Luísa Sousa	Mexico	4:39.2	
5	Susana Peper; A.Marchetti; Lusiana Rubie; L.Hasenbein	Argentina	4:42.0	
6	A.Canoza; M.Mora; María Rosario de Vivanco; P.Gonzalez	Peru	5:01.8	
7	- - - -	-	-	
8	- - - -	-	-	
