= Molly Botkin =

American swimmer (born 1943)

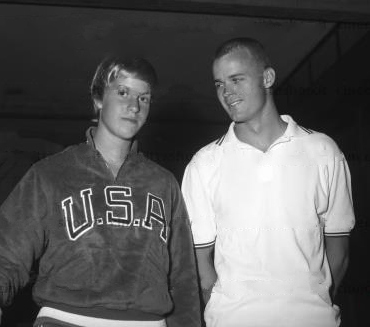
- Botkin (left) and Jeff Farrell at the 1960 Olympics

Personal information
- Full name: Mary Ray Botkin
- Nickname: Molly
- National team: United States
- Born: August 26, 1943 (age 83) Los Angeles, California, U.S.
- Height: 5 ft 8 in (1.73 m)
- Weight: 134 lb (61 kg)
- Spouse: Frederick B. Rossiter Jr.

Sport
- Sport: Swimming
- Strokes: Freestyle
- Club: Sherman Oaks Swim School; Los Angeles Athletic Club (LAAC)
- College team: St. John's University 1962
- Coach: Peter Daland (LAAC)
Medal record
Women's swimming
Representing the United States
Pan American Games
Gold medal – first place	1959 Chicago	4x100 m freestyle
Silver medal – second place	1959 Chicago	100 m freestyle
Bronze medal – third place	1959 Chicago	100 m butterfly

Molly Ray Botkin (born August 26, 1943), later known by her married name as Molly Botkin Rossiter in 1968, is an American former competition swimmer, 1960 Rome Olympic participant in the 4x100-meter freestyle relay, and a Pan American Games gold medalist. She swam for St. John's University in 1962, and later graduated from the University of Southern California.

Botkin was born August 26, 1943 in Hollywood, California, with older brothers Ted and Perry Jr., to Virginia and Perry Botkin, an accomplished musician on stringed instruments, particularly the ukelele and guitar. Father Perry's music was featured on radio, movie soundtracks, and albums from the 1920s-1960s. From grade school through the eleventh grade, Molly attended Studio City's Campbell Hall School, founded as a K-12 Episcopal school in the greater Los Angeles area.

== Early swimming ==
Botkin learned to swim at the age of five, taking lessons from swim coach Rita Curtis of the Rita Curtis Swim School. She began training and competing for the Sherman Oaks Swim School under Head Coach Tony Dandeneau in July, 1953, shortly before her tenth birthday. Excelling early, Molly captured twelve winning finishes out of 18 competitions she entered in the under-ten age group, setting nine national age-group records in the process. Distinguished early as a short distance specialist, in 50 and 100-yard competition in 1955, she set twelve records for the 11-12 age group that included freestyle, butterfly, backstroke, and individual medley events. Reaching national prominence in her early teens, she attempted to make the U.S. Olympic team in 1956 in both the 100-yard butterfly and freestyle events, but did not progress to the finals.

=== Los Angeles Athletic Club ===
Beginning in late 1955, Molly began swimming for the Los Angeles Athletic Club. By 1957, she was competing at an elite level under the direction of Hall of Fame Coach Peter Daland, who would have an exceptional career as the Head swim coach of the University of Southern California from 1957-1992. At the age of 13 at the AAU Senior Women's Swimming and Diving Championships in Houston, Texas on August 14, 1957, her team placed first, as she swam anchor for the Los Angeles Athletic Club in the 440-yard freestyle relay setting an American and AAU record time of 4:36. Botkin swam with the team of Sharon Kelly, Judy Primrose, and Karen Simonson.

In another important career meet in 1957, competing in the 100-yard freestyle event at Beverly Hills High School, Botkin captured the American Athletic Union indoor championship with a time of 56.3. At 13 in May, 1957, her practices consisted of five day a week two hour evening sessions, which she would increase that summer to a two hour morning and one hour evening practice.

=== Pan American Games ===
At the 1959 Pan American Games in Chicago, she won three medals, including a gold as a member of the winning U.S. team in the women's 4×100-meter freestyle relay. Individually, she also received a silver for her second-place finish in the 100-meter freestyle, and a bronze for a third-place performance in the 100-meter butterfly.

Shortly prior to the Olympic trials, Molly suffered from a back injury initially caused years earlier by a fall while tumbling during gymnastics at her High School gym. The injury was aggravated due to the intense training required in preparation for Olympic competition. She underwent treatment for several months, but decided to resume her training prior to the 1960 trials.

=== 1960 Rome Olympics ===
At the August, 1960 Olympic trails in Detroit, Molly placed fourth in the 100-meter freestyle qualifying her for a place on the U.S. women's 4x100-meter freestyle relay.

Alfter qualifying for the trials, Molly represented the United States as a sixteen-year-old at the 1960 Olympics in Rome, where she swam for the gold medal-winning U.S. team in the preliminary heats of the women's 4×100-meter freestyle relay. Botkin swam in the anchor position in the first of two preliminary heats with Donna de Varona, Susan Doerr, and Sylvia Ruuska, recording a combined a time of 4:18.9. Her team placed first in their preliminary heat, subsequently advancing to the finals, where she did not swim.

She did not receive a medal, however, because only relay swimmers who competed in the event final were medal-eligible under the 1960 Olympic rules. In the final, the American 4x100 meter relay women swimmers swam a combined world record time of 4:08.9, with the Australian team taking a silver finishing 2.4 seconds later, while recording a time of 4:11.3. The German team took the bronze with a time of 4:19.7. In a rather close finish in the finals, the last two American freestyle swimmers Carolyn Wood and Chris Von Salsa opened a narrow lead on the Australian team due to a poor showing by Australia's third position relay swimmer Lorraine Crap.

=== College education and swimming ===
Retiring from elite competitive swimming around 17 after the Rome Olympics, Molly completed High School at the American School in Lugano, Switzerland. In 1962, she attended New York's St. John's University, briefly both competing and coaching on their women's swim team. She set a Women's Eastern Intercollegiate swimming record while at St. John's in the 50-yard freestyle of 27.5, which held through March, 1963. She later attended and graduated the University of Southern California in the mid-1960's.

In the summer of 1962, Molly planned to coach an age group swimming team organized by the Rita Curtis Swim Schools in the greater Los Angeles area. From 1971-2006, as Molly B. Rossiter, she trained and occasionally competed in swimming primarily with Walnut Creek Masters of United States Masters Swimming. She specialized in freestyle, medley, and backstroke age-group events from her early thirties into her early 60's.

Molly married Frederick B. Rossiter Jr. of Rochester, New York, on April, 1968, at St. Michael's Episcopal Church in Studio City, California.

=== Awards ===
Botkin was named Southern California's "Athlete of the Month" for April 1957, by the Helms Athletic Foundation for her 58.3 time in the 100-yard freestyle, becoming the youngest athlete to obtain the award since its initial year. She was a women's swim team All American for three successive years from 1957-1960.
