= Mary Freeman (swimmer) =

American swimmer (born 1933)

- As U. of Pennsylvania Coach circa 1960

Personal information
- Full name: Mary Gray Freeman
- National team: United States
- Born: October 30, 1933 (age 92) Bangor, Maine, U.S.
- Coaching career

Biographical details
- Education: George Washington University

Playing career
- 1948-1953: Walter Reed Swimming Club

Coaching career (HC unless noted)
- 1955-1968: Vesper Boat Club; Women's Swim Team; Philadelphia
- 1960: U. of Pennsylvania; Women's Swim Team

Accomplishments and honors

Championships
- 1961 National Championship (Vespar Boat Club) '61 '66 AAU Nat. Outdoor Team Champs; 56-58 Eastern U.S. & Middle Atlantic Champs (Vesper Boat Club)

Awards
- International Swimming Hall of Fame

Sport
- Sport: Swimming
- Strokes: Backstroke, Individual Medley
- Club: Walter Reed Swim Club
- Coach: Jim Campbell

Mary Gray Freeman (born October 30, 1933), also known by her former married name Mary Kelly, as Mary Freeman Kelly and by her subsequent married name Mary Spitzer, is an American former swimmer who represented the United States at the 1952 Summer Olympics in Helsinki, Finland in the 100-meter backstroke. After leaving competitive swimming in 1953, she became a Hall of Fame swim coach for Philadelphia's Vesper Boat Club from 1955–68 and coached the Women's Team at the University of Pennsylvania in 1960. Recognized as one of the most outstanding women coaches of her era, in 1964 she was the first woman to be recommended as an American Olympic coach but declined the nomination, believing a man should take the honor as they were more reliant on earning wages to live.

== Education ==
Mary Gray Freeman was born in Bangor, Maine, to Christine Gray and Monroe E. Freeman, a chemist who served as a Colonel in the U.S. Army Medical Service Corps during the war. She attended Amherst High School in Massachusetts and graduated from Coolidge High School in Washington. She later studied at George Washington University from around 1950-1954, while continuing to pursue her competitive swimming through clubs, as George Washington had no women's swim team at the time.

== Swimming competitor ==
Kelly began swimming in the Walter Reed Army Hospital pool in Washington as her father, a chemist, was on the staff. Her competitive career began around 1948, aged 15. She started 6 a.m. swim sessions with the Walter Reed Swim Club under Coach Jim Campbell, who was also a physical therapist at the hospital. Campbell would later coach swimmers at the University of Pennsylvania as would Mary. In 1952, Freeman made the U.S. Olympic team bound for Helsinki. Recognized as an attractive American athletic champion with a Hollywood connection through her husband, she held a measure of celebrity status and appeared on the cover of Life Magazine on July 23, 1951.

== 1952 Olympics ==
In the 1952 Helsinki Olympics, she finished ninth in the women's 100-meter backstroke, placing ninth overall with a time of 1:18.0, and did not qualify for the finals.

=== AAU National champion ===
Freeman won the backstroke competition in the 100-meter and 200-meter events at the 1951 AAU outdoor championships. That year she also captured AAU 200-yard indoor backstroke title. In 1953, one of her best years, she won three additional AAU competitions; the 330-yard outdoor medley relay, the 880 yard outdoor freestyle relay, and the indoor 300 yard individual medley.

She was proficient in each of the three swim strokes at the time and in January 1952, set a national record in the 150-yard individual medley consisting of back, breast, and freestyle, at a District AAU Meet in York, Pennsylvania. Her proficiency in all three strokes would be an advantage as a future swim coach.

== Marriages ==
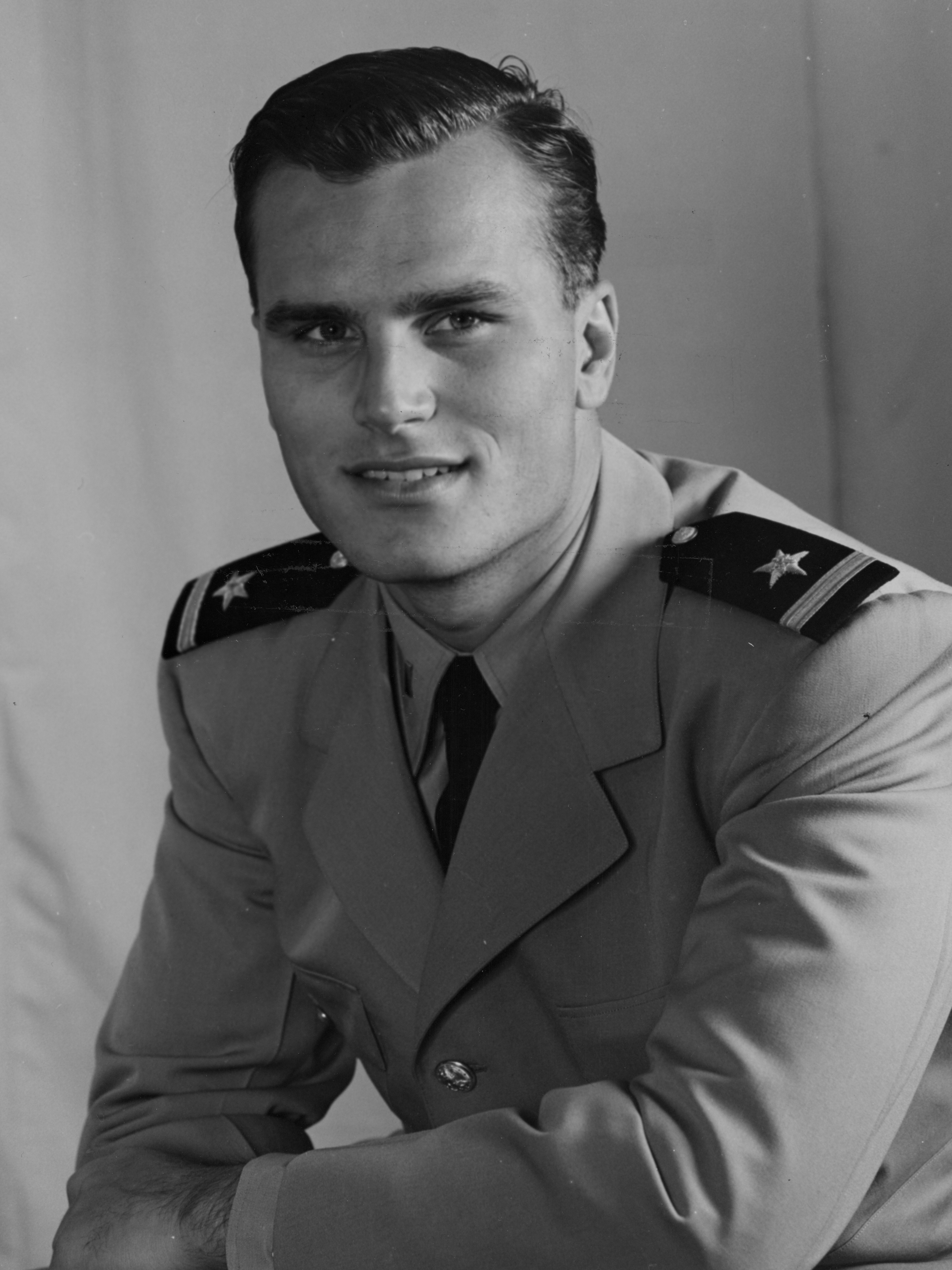
Ensign John Kelly, Jr. '51

After retiring from competitive swimming, Freeman married Olympic rowing bronze medalist John B. Kelly Jr., the brother of movie actress Grace Kelly, on March 4, 1954. Both she and Kelly participated in the 1952 Helsinki Olympics and had met there. Freeman and Kelly had six children; she sued for divorce in 1968. She later married Professor Alan Spitzer of the University of Iowa in late May, 1981, and lived in Iowa City, Iowa.

== Coaching swimming ==
She went on to become a renowned swimming coach after retiring from competitive swimming around 1953. In 1955, she established one of the first all-women swim teams in the country, which she named Vesper Boat Club. She picked the name as it was the same as the rowing team in Philadelphia, Pennsylvania for which her husband John was competing.

Mary coached the University of Pennsylvania's Women's Swim Team at the 15th Annual College Eastern Intercollegiate Swim Championships on March 12, 1960. The Pennsylvania women were runners-up to winner West Chester State Teacher's College, and the team's Barbara Chesneau broke the 50-yard breastroke record with a time of 36.2.

=== Vesper Boat Club achievements ===
One of their most recognized first team wins came in August 1961, when the Vesper Boat Club won the AAU Outdoor Team National Championships in Philadelphia, Pennsylvania. Altogether, Freeman sent five women on to represent the United States in the Olympic Games. In her outstanding career as a swimming coach, she produced 15 national champions who won a total of 26 national championships in their swimming careers, set 10 world records and made 9 Olympic finals.

The team at Vesper Boat Club were the AAU National Team Champions in 1966 as well, and were the Eastern U.S. and Middle Atlantic Champions in 1956-1958.

She would have been the first woman to be selected as an Olympic swimming coach for the United States in 1964, but took her name off the list because it was not important to her at the time. In her short coaching career, she inspired many women, including over a dozen of her own swimmers, to go into coaching. She retired entirely from coaching in 1968 and was replaced at Vesper Boat Club by Hall of Fame swimmer George Breen, though Breen had coached with the club for several prior years.

=== Outstanding swimmers coached ===
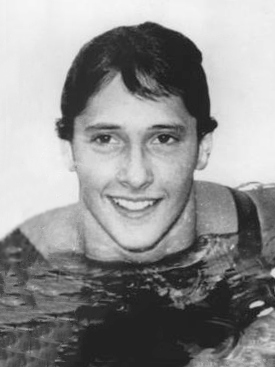
'64 Olympian Martha Randall

'68 Olympian Elie Daniel

In 1958, Lyn Hopkins was Coach Kelly's first swimmer to place in the finals of the women's national championships—both for short course in Dallas, Texas and then for the long course championship in Topeka, Kansas. Other Vesper Boat Club swimmers, including Ellie Daniel, Susan Doerr, Nina Harmer and Martha Randall, and Jane Barkman quickly began to compete at the national level. By 1960, half a dozen of her team members swam at the U.S. Olympic Trials, with two being selected to compete at the 1960 Summer Olympics in Rome.

Not confined solely to coaching women, at the Vesper Boat Club, she was also a mentor to Carl Robie a male Olympic medalist in butterfly in both the '64 and '68 Olympics. Freeman was an important early coach to Robie, who dominated the 200-meter butterfly event, though the butterfly was not recognized as a competitive stroke during Freeman's swimming career.

=== Administrative roles in American swimming ===
In the 1960's, she served on the U.S. Olympic Women’s Swimming Committee. From 1956-64 she served with the AAU Women’s Swim Committee as well. From 1959-1961, she was a member of the All American Women’s Swimming Team Selection Committee from 1959-1961. She was chair of the AAU Swimming Award Committee from 1965-1968, and also worked with Swimming's AAU Joint Rules Committee from 1962-1964 and in 1967.

She moved to Iowa City in 1981 after her marriage to history professor Alan Spitzer of the University of Iowa. In 1988, she was writing a dissertation with the Linguistics Department and working as a teaching assistant at the university.

=== Honors ===
Freeman was inducted into the International Swimming Hall of Fame for her coaching accomplishments in 1988. She was admitted into the American Swimming Coaches Hall of Fame in 2008.
