= 100 metres butterfly =

The 100 metres butterfly is an event in competitive swimming. World records are ratified by World Aquatics (formerly FINA). The current long course world record holders are the US' Caeleb Dressel and Gretchen Walsh, while the current short course world record holders are Canada's Joshua Liendo, and Walsh.

The men's event was first contested at the Olympic Games in 1968, while the women's event was introduced at the 1956 games; the current Olympic champions are Hungary's Kristóf Milák and the US' Torri Huske. The men's and women's events have been contested at the World Aquatics Championships since the inaugural championships in 1973; the current world champions (long course) are the France's Maxime Grousset, and Walsh. The men's and women's events have been contested at the World Aquatics Swimming Championships (25m) since the inaugural championships in 1993; the current world champions (short course) are Switzerland's Noè Ponti, and Walsh.

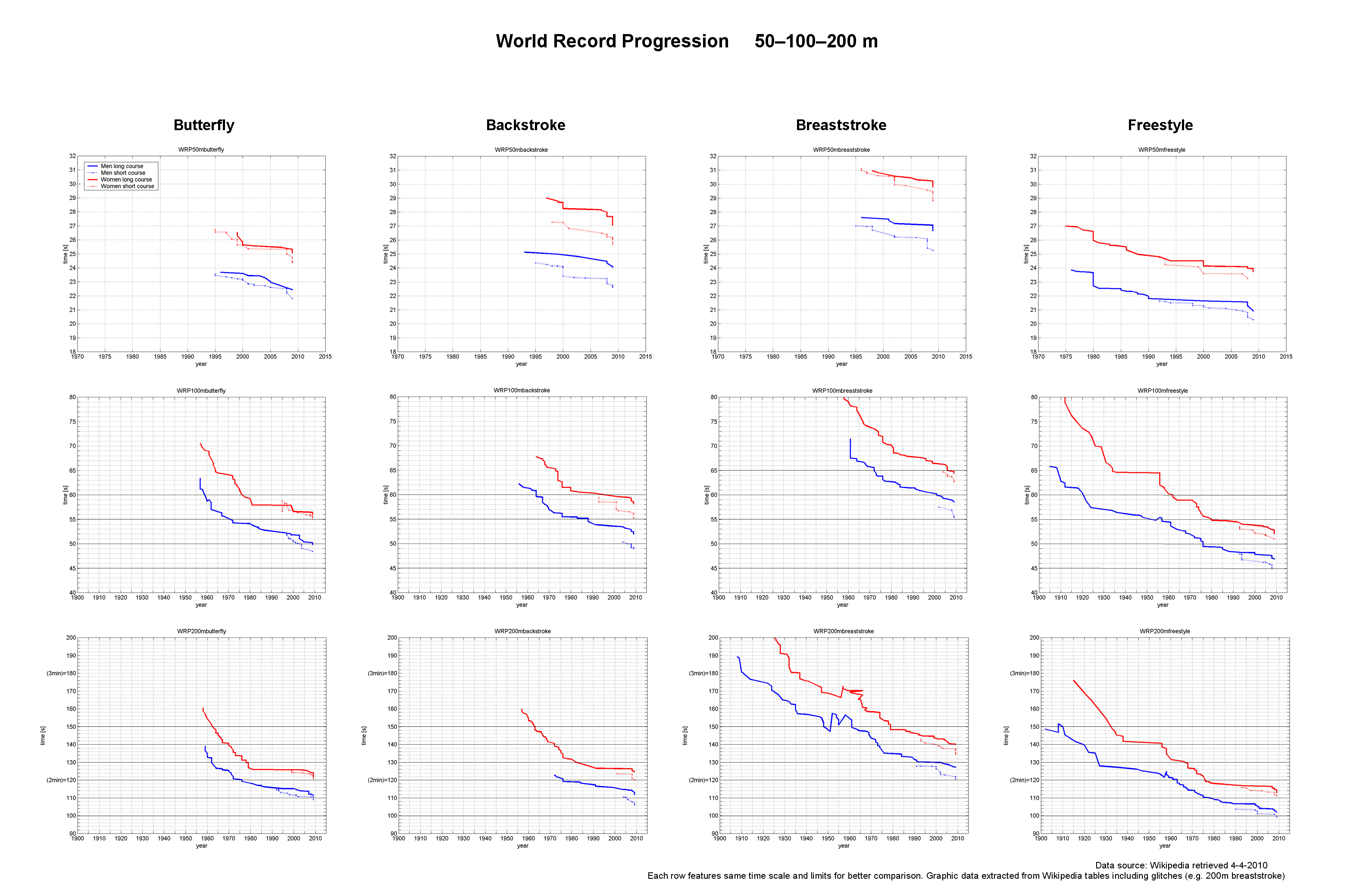
Graphic data for World Record Progression in Men and Women Swimming 50m-100m-200m Long and Short Course Butterfly-Backstroke-Breaststroke-Freestyle

== World record progression ==
=== Men long course ===
| # | Time | | Name | Nationality | Date | Meet | Location | Ref |
|---|---|---|---|---|---|---|---|---|
| 1 | 1:03.4 | | György Tumpek | Hungary | 26 May 1957 | - | Budapest, Hungary | |
| 2 | 1:01.5 | | Takashi Ishimoto | Japan | 16 June 1957 | - | Kurume, Japan | |
| 3 | 1:01.3 | | Takashi Ishimoto | Japan | 7 July 1957 | - | Tokyo, Japan | |
| 4 | 1:01.2 | | Takashi Ishimoto | Japan | 6 September 1957 | - | Kurume, Japan | |
| 5 | 1:01.1 | | Takashi Ishimoto | Japan | 29 June 1958 | - | Los Angeles, United States | |
| 6 | 1:01.0 | | Takashi Ishimoto | Japan | 14 September 1958 | - | Kōchi, Japan | |
| 7 | 59.0 | | Lance Larson | United States | 26 June 1960 | - | Los Angeles, United States | |
| 8 | 58.7 | | Lance Larson | United States | 24 July 1960 | - | Toledo, United States | |
| 9 | 58.6 | | Fred Schmidt | United States | 20 August 1961 | - | Los Angeles, United States | |
| 10 | 58.4 | | Luis Nicolao | Argentina | 24 April 1962 | - | Rio de Janeiro, Brazil | |
| 11 | 57.0 | | Luis Nicolao | Argentina | 27 April 1962 | - | Rio de Janeiro, Brazil | |
| 12 | 56.3 | | Mark Spitz | United States | 31 July 1967 | Pan American Games | Winnipeg, Canada | |
| 12 | 56.3 | = | Doug Russell | United States | 29 August 1967 | - | Tokyo, Japan | |
| 14 | 55.7 | | Mark Spitz | United States | 7 October 1967 | - | West Berlin, West Germany | |
| 15 | 55.6 | | Mark Spitz | United States | 30 August 1968 | US Olympic Trials | Long Beach, United States | |
| 16 | 55.0 | | Mark Spitz | United States | 25 August 1971 | AAU National Championships | Houston, United States | |
| 17 | 54.72 | h | Mark Spitz | United States | 4 August 1972 | US Olympic Trials | Chicago, United States | |
| 18 | 54.56 | | Mark Spitz | United States | 4 August 1972 | US Olympic Trials | Chicago, United States | |
| 19 | 54.27 | | Mark Spitz | United States | 31 August 1972 | Olympic Games | Munich, West Germany | |
| 20 | 54.18 | | Joe Bottom | United States | 27 August 1977 | USA vs GDR Dual Meet | East Berlin, East Germany | |
| 21 | 54.15 | | Pär Arvidsson | Sweden | 11 April 1980 | US National Championships | Austin, United States | |
| 22 | 53.81 | | William Paulus | United States | 3 April 1981 | - | Austin, United States | |
| 23 | 53.44 | | Matt Gribble | United States | 6 August 1983 | US National Championships | Clovis, United States | |
| 24 | 53.38 | | Pablo Morales | United States | 26 June 1984 | US Olympic Trials | Indianapolis, United States | |
| 25 | 53.08 | | Michael Gross | West Germany | 30 July 1984 | Olympic Games | Los Angeles, United States | |
| 26 | 52.84 | | Pablo Morales | United States | 23 June 1986 | US National Championships | Orlando, United States | |
| 27 | 52.32 | | Denis Pankratov | Russia | 23 August 1995 | European Championships | Vienna, Austria | |
| 28 | 52.27 | | Denis Pankratov | Russia | 24 July 1996 | Olympic Games | Atlanta, United States | |
| 29 | 52.15 | | Michael Klim | Australia | 9 October 1997 | Australian Championships | Brisbane, Australia | |
| 30 | 52.03 | tt | Michael Klim | Australia | 10 December 1999 | AIS Meet | Canberra, Australia | |
| 31 | 51.81 | tt | Michael Klim | Australia | 12 December 1999 | AIS Meet | Canberra, Australia | |
| 32 | 51.76 | sf | Andriy Serdinov | Ukraine | 25 July 2003 | World Championships | Barcelona, Spain | |
| 33 | 51.47 | sf | Michael Phelps | United States | 25 July 2003 | World Championships | Barcelona, Spain | |
| 34 | 50.98 | | Ian Crocker | United States | 26 July 2003 | World Championships | Barcelona, Spain | |
| 35 | 50.76 | | Ian Crocker | United States | 13 July 2004 | US Olympic Trials | Long Beach, United States | |
| 36 | 50.40 | | Ian Crocker | United States | 30 July 2005 | World Championships | Montreal, Canada | |
| 37 | 50.22 | | Michael Phelps | United States | 9 July 2009 | US National Championships | Indianapolis, United States | |
| 38 | 50.01 | sf | Milorad Čavić | Serbia | 31 July 2009 | World Championships | Rome, Italy | |
| 39 | 49.82 | | Michael Phelps | United States | 1 August 2009 | World Championships | Rome, Italy | |
| 40 | 49.50 | sf | Caeleb Dressel | United States | 26 July 2019 | World Championships | Gwangju, South Korea | |
| 41 | 49.45 | | Caeleb Dressel | United States | 31 July 2021 | Olympic Games | Tokyo, Japan | |

=== Men short course ===
| # | Time | | Name | Nationality | Date | Meet | Location | Ref |
|---|---|---|---|---|---|---|---|---|
| 1 | 52.07 | | Marcel Gery | Canada | 1 February 1990 | - | Paris, France | |
| 2 | 51.94 | | Denis Pankratov | Russia | 4 February 1996 | World Cup | Paris, France | |
| 3 | 51.93 | | Denis Pankratov | Russia | 5 February 1997 | World Cup | Imperia, Italy | |
| 4 | 51.78 | | Denis Pankratov | Russia | 9 February 1997 | World Cup | Paris, France | |
| 5 | 51.16 | h | Michael Klim | Australia | 22 January 1998 | World Cup | Sydney, Australia | |
| 6 | 51.07 | | Michael Klim | Australia | 22 January 1998 | World Cup | Sydney, Australia | |
| 7 | 51.02 | | James Hickman | Great Britain | 14 December 1998 | European Championships | Sheffield, United Kingdom | |
| 8 | 50.99 | | Michael Klim | Australia | 2 September 1999 | Australian Championships | Canberra, Australia | |
| 9 | 50.59 | sf | Lars Frölander | Sweden | 16 March 2000 | World Championships | Athens, Greece | |
| 10 | 50.44 | | Lars Frölander | Sweden | 17 March 2000 | World Championships | Athens, Greece | |
| 11 | 50.26 | | Thomas Rupprath | Germany | 14 December 2001 | European Championships | Antwerp, Belgium | |
| 12 | 50.10 | | Thomas Rupprath | Germany | 27 January 2002 | World Cup | Berlin, Germany | |
| 13 | 50.02 | | Milorad Čavić | Serbia and Montenegro | 12 December 2003 | European Championships | Dublin, Ireland | |
| 14 | 49.77 | h | Ian Crocker | United States | 26 March 2004 | NCAA Men's Division I Championships | East Meadow, United States | |
| 15 | 49.07 | | Ian Crocker | United States | 26 March 2004 | NCAA Men's Division I Championships | East Meadow, United States | |
| 16 | 48.99 | | Yevgeny Korotyshkin | Russia | 7 November 2009 | World Cup | Moscow, Russia | |
| 17 | 48.48 | | Yevgeny Korotyshkin | Russia | 15 November 2009 | World Cup | Berlin, Germany | |
| 18 | 48.44 | | Chad le Clos | South Africa | 4 December 2014 | World Championships | Doha, Qatar | |
| 19 | 48.08 | | Chad le Clos | South Africa | 8 December 2016 | World Championships | Windsor, Canada | |
| 20 | 47.78 | | Caeleb Dressel | United States | 21 November 2020 | International Swimming League | Budapest, Hungary | |
| 21 | 47.71 | | Noè Ponti | Switzerland | 14 December 2024 | World Championships | Budapest, Hungary | |
| 22 | 47.68 | | Joshua Liendo | Canada | 23 October 2025 | World Cup | Toronto, Canada | |

=== Women long course ===
| # | Time | | Name | Nationality | Date | Meet | Location | Ref |
|---|---|---|---|---|---|---|---|---|
| 1 | 1:10.5 | | Atie Voorbij | Netherlands | 4 August 1957 | - | Rhenen, Netherlands | |
| 2 | 1:09.6 | | Nancy Ramey | United States | 28 June 1958 | - | Los Angeles, United States | |
| 3 | 1:09.1 | | Nancy Ramey | United States | 2 September 1959 | - | Chicago, United States | |
| 4 | 1:08.9 | | Janice Andrew | Australia | 2 April 1961 | - | Tokyo, Japan | |
| 5 | 1:08.8 | | Mary Stewart | Canada | 12 August 1961 | - | Philadelphia, United States | |
| 6 | 1:08.2 | | Susan Doerr | United States | 12 August 1961 | - | Philadelphia, United States | |
| 7 | 1:07.3 | | Mary Stewart | Canada | 28 July 1962 | - | Vancouver, Canada | |
| 8 | 1:06.5 | | Kathy Ellis | United States | 16 August 1963 | - | High Point, United States | |
| 9 | 1:06.1 | | Ada Kok | Netherlands | 1 September 1963 | - | Soestduinen, Netherlands | |
| 10 | 1:05.1 | | Ada Kok | Netherlands | 30 May 1964 | - | Blackpool, United Kingdom | |
| 11 | 1:04.7 | | Sharon Stouder | United States | 16 Oct 1964 | Olympic Games | Tokyo, Japan | |
| 12 | 1:04.1 | | Alice Jones | United States | 20 August 1970 | US National Championships | Los Angeles, United States | |
| 13 | 1:03.9 | | Mayumi Aoki | Japan | 21 Jul 1972 | - | Tokyo, Japan | |
| 14 | 1:03.8 | sf | Andrea Gyarmati | Hungary | 31 August 1972 | Olympic Games | Munich, West Germany | |
| 15 | 1:03.34 | | Mayumi Aoki | Japan | 1 Sep 1972 | Olympic Games | Munich, West Germany | |
| 16 | 1:03.05 | | Kornelia Ender | East Germany | 14 Apr 1973 | - | East Berlin, East Germany | |
| 17 | 1:02.31 | | Kornelia Ender | East Germany | 14 Jul 1973 | East German Championships | East Berlin, East Germany | |
| 18 | 1:02.09 | h | Rosemarie Kother | East Germany | 21 August 1974 | European Championships | Vienna, Austria | |
| 19 | 1:01.99 | | Rosemarie Kother | East Germany | 22 August 1974 | European Championships | Vienna, Austria | |
| 20 | 1:01.88 | | Rosemarie Kother | East Germany | 1 Sep 1974 | USA vs GDR Dual Meet | Concord, United States | |
| 21 | 1:01.33 | | Kornelia Ender | East Germany | 9 Jun 1975 | East German Championships | Wittenberg, East Germany | |
| 22 | 1:01.24 | | Kornelia Ender | East Germany | 24 July 1975 | World Championships | Cali, Colombia | |
| 23 | 1:00.13 | | Kornelia Ender | East Germany | 4 June 1976 | East German Championships | East Berlin, East Germany | |
| 23 | 1:00.13 | = | Kornelia Ender | East Germany | 22 Jul 1976 | Olympic Games | Montreal, Canada | |
| 25 | 59.78 | | Christiane Knacke | East Germany | 28 August 1977 | USA vs GDR Dual Meet | East Berlin, East Germany | |
| 26 | 59.46 | | Andrea Pollack | East Germany | 3 Jul 1978 | East German Championships | East Berlin, East Germany | |
| 27 | 59.26 | | Mary T. Meagher | United States | 11 Apr 1980 | US Spring National Championships | Austin, United States | |
| 28 | 57.93 | | Mary T. Meagher | United States | 16 August 1981 | US National Championships | Brown Deer, United States | |
| 29 | 57.88 | | Jenny Thompson | United States | 23 August 1999 | Pan Pacific Championships | Sydney, Australia | |
| 30 | 56.69 | | Inge de Bruijn | Netherlands | 27 May 2000 | Super Speedo Grand Prix | Sheffield, Great Britain | |
| 31 | 56.64 | | Inge de Bruijn | Netherlands | 22 July 2000 | PN Senior Regional | Federal Way, United States | |
| 32 | 56.61 | | Inge de Bruijn | Netherlands | 17 September 2000 | Olympic Games | Sydney, Australia | |
| 33 | 56.44 | sf | Sarah Sjöström | Sweden | 26 July 2009 | World Championships | Rome, Italy | |
| 34 | 56.06 | | Sarah Sjöström | Sweden | 27 July 2009 | World Championships | Rome, Italy | |
| 35 | 55.98 | | Dana Vollmer | United States | 29 July 2012 | Olympic Games | London, Great Britain | |
| 36 | 55.74 | sf | Sarah Sjöström | Sweden | 2 August 2015 | World Championships | Kazan, Russia | |
| 37 | 55.64 | | Sarah Sjöström | Sweden | 3 August 2015 | World Championships | Kazan, Russia | |
| 38 | 55.48 | | Sarah Sjöström | Sweden | 7 August 2016 | Olympic Games | Rio de Janeiro, Brazil | |
| 39 | 55.18 | sf | Gretchen Walsh | United States | 15 June 2024 | US Olympic Trials | Indianapolis, United States | |
| 40 | 55.09 | h | Gretchen Walsh | United States | 3 May 2025 | Pro Swim Series | Fort Lauderdale, United States | |
| 41 | 54.60 | | Gretchen Walsh | United States | 3 May 2025 | Pro Swim Series | Fort Lauderdale, United States | |
| 42 | 54.33 | | Gretchen Walsh | United States | 2 May 2026 | Fort Lauderdale Open | Fort Lauderdale, United States | |

=== Women short course ===
| # | Time | | Name | Nationality | Date | Meet | Location | Ref |
|---|---|---|---|---|---|---|---|---|
| 1 | 58.77 | | Angela Kennedy | Australia | 18 February 1995 | World Cup | Gelsenkirchen, Germany | |
| 2 | 58.68 | | Liu Limin | China | 2 December 1995 | World Championships | Rio de Janeiro, Brazil | |
| 3 | 58.29 | | Misty Hyman | United States | 1 December 1996 | - | Sainte-Foy, Canada | |
| 4 | 58.24 | | Ayari Aoyama | Japan | 28 March 1997 | - | Tokyo, Japan | |
| 5 | 57.79 | | Jenny Thompson | United States | 19 April 1997 | World Championships | Gothenburg, Sweden | |
| 6 | 56.90 | | Jenny Thompson | United States | 1 December 1998 | World Cup | College Station, United States | |
| 7 | 56.80 | | Jenny Thompson | United States | 12 February 2000 | World Cup | Paris, France | |
| 8 | 56.56 | sf | Jenny Thompson | United States | 18 March 2000 | World Championships | Athens, Greece | |
| 9 | 56.55 | sf | Martina Moravcová | Slovakia | 26 January 2002 | World Cup | Berlin, Germany | |
| 10 | 56.34 | | Natalie Coughlin | United States | 22 November 2002 | - | East Meadow, United States | |
| 11 | 55.95 | | Libby Lenton | Australia | 18 August 2006 | Australian Championships | Hobart, Australia | |
| 12 | 55.89 | | Felicity Galvez | Australia | 13 April 2008 | World Championships | Manchester, United Kingdom | |
| 13 | 55.74 | | Libby Trickett | Australia | 26 April 2008 | Swimming Australia Grand Prix | Canberra, Australia | |
| 14 | 55.68 | | Jessicah Schipper | Australia | 12 August 2009 | Australian Championships | Hobart, Australia | |
| 15 | 55.46 | | Felicity Galvez | Australia | 11 November 2009 | World Cup | Berlin, Germany | |
| 16 | 55.05 | sf | Diane Bui Duyet | France | 12 December 2009 | European Championships | Istanbul, Turkey | |
| 17 | 54.61 | | Sarah Sjöström | Sweden | 7 December 2014 | World Championships | Doha, Qatar | |
| 18 | 54.59 | | Kelsi Dahlia | United States | 3 December 2021 | International Swimming League | Eindhoven, Netherlands | |
| 19 | 54.05 | | Maggie Mac Neil | Canada | 18 December 2022 | World Championships | Melbourne, Australia | |
| 20 | 53.24 | h | Gretchen Walsh | United States | 13 December 2024 | World Championships | Budapest, Hungary | |
| 21 | 52.87 | sf | Gretchen Walsh | United States | 13 December 2024 | World Championships | Budapest, Hungary | |
| 22 | 52.71 | | Gretchen Walsh | United States | 14 December 2024 | World Championships | Budapest, Hungary | |

== All-time top 25 ==
Tables show data for two definitions of "Top 25" - the top 25 100 m butterfly times and the top 25 athletes:
- denotes top performance for athletes in the top 25 100 m butterfly times
- denotes lesser performances, still in the top 25 100 m butterfly times, by repeat athletes
- denotes top performance (only) for other top 25 athletes who fall outside the top 25 100 m butterfly times

=== Men long course ===
- Correct as of September 2026

| Ath.# | Perf.# | Time | Athlete | Nation | Date | Place | Ref. |
|---|---|---|---|---|---|---|---|
| 1 | 1 | 49.45 | Caeleb Dressel | United States | 31 July 2021 | Tokyo | |
| 2 | 2 | 49.48 | Kristóf Milák | Hungary | 13 August 2026 | Paris | |
| | 3 | 49.50 | Dressel #2 | | 26 July 2019 | Gwangju | |
| 3 | 4 | 49.62 | Maxime Grousset | France | 2 August 2025 | Singapore | |
| | 5 | 49.66 | Dressel #3 | | 27 July 2019 | Gwangju | |
| | 6 | 49.68 | Milák #2 | | 31 July 2021 | Tokyo | |
| | 7 | 49.70 | Grousset #2 | | 13 August 2026 | Paris | |
| | 8 | 49.71 | Dressel #4 | | 30 July 2021 | Tokyo | |
| | 9 | 49.76 | Dressel #5 | | 18 June 2021 | Omaha | |
| 4 | 10 | 49.82 | Michael Phelps | United States | 1 August 2009 | Rome | |
| 5 | 11 | 49.83 | Noè Ponti | Switzerland | 2 August 2025 | Singapore | |
| | 12 | 49.86 | Dressel #6 | | 29 July 2017 | Budapest | |
| | 13 | 49.87 | Dressel #7 | | 19 June 2021 | Omaha | |
| | 14 | 49.90 | Milák #3 | | 3 August 2024 | Paris | |
| | 15 | 49.93 | Ponti #2 | | 13 August 2026 | Paris | |
| 6 | 16 | 49.95 | Milorad Čavić | Serbia | 1 August 2009 | Rome | |
| 7 | 17 | 49.99 | Joshua Liendo | Canada | 3 August 2024 | Paris | |
| | 18 | 50.01 | Čavić #2 | | 31 July 2009 | Rome | |
| | 18 | 50.01 | Dressel #8 | | 28 April 2022 | Greensboro | |
| 8 | 20 | 50.05 | Ilya Kharun | (Note: Ilya Kharun initially represented Canada before announcing in January 2026 his intention to switch sporting citizenship to the US. Under World Aquatics rules, athletes must cease representing their former nation for 12 months before they can represent their new nation; Kharun became eligible to represent the US in October 2026. The attributed nation (or lack thereof) indicates which team he represented at the time.) | 30 July 2026 | Irvine | |
| | 21 | 50.06 | Liendo #2 | | 19 May 2024 | Toronto | |
| | 22 | 50.07 | Dressel #9 | | 28 July 2017 | Budapest | |
| | 22 | 50.07 | Kharun #2 | | 2 August 2025 | Singapore | |
| | 24 | 50.08 | Dressel #10 | | 28 July 2017 | Budapest | |
| | 25 | 50.09 | Liendo #3 | | 2 August 2025 | Singapore | |
| 9 | | 50.24 | Shaine Casas | United States | 5 December 2025 | Austin | |
| 10 | | 50.25 | Matthew Temple | Australia | 3 December 2023 | Tokyo | |
| 10 | | 50.25 | Hubert Kós | Hungary | 13 August 2026 | Paris | |
| 12 | | 50.39 | Joseph Schooling | Singapore | 12 August 2016 | Rio de Janeiro | |
| 13 | | 50.40 | Ian Crocker | United States | 30 July 2005 | Montreal | |
| 14 | | 50.41 | Rafael Muñoz | Spain | 1 August 2009 | Rome | |
| 15 | | 50.42 | Thomas Ceccon | Italy | 1 August 2025 | Singapore | |
| 16 | | 50.46 | Dare Rose | United States | 29 July 2023 | Fukuoka | |
| 17 | | 50.56 | Chad le Clos | South Africa | 8 August 2015 | Kazan | |
| 17 | | 50.56 | Shoon Mitsunaga | Japan | 23 September 2026 | Tokyo | |
| 19 | | 50.58 | Ben Armbruster | Australia | 26 July 2026 | Glasgow | |
| 20 | | 50.59 | Nyls Korstanje | Netherlands | 2 August 2024 | Paris | |
| 21 | | 50.64 | Piero Codia | Italy | 9 August 2018 | Glasgow | |
| 21 | | 50.64 | Rowan Cox | United States | 30 July 2026 | Irvine | |
| 23 | | 50.65 | Albert Subirats | Venezuela | 31 July 2009 | Rome | |
| 24 | | 50.67 | James Guy | Great Britain | 28 July 2017 | Budapest | |
| 25 | | 50.68 | Maxime Rooney | United States | 2 August 2019 | Stanford | |

=== Men short course ===
- Correct as of November 2026

| Ath.# | Perf.# | Time | Athlete | Nation | Date | Place | Ref. |
|---|---|---|---|---|---|---|---|
| 1 | 1 | 47.68 | Joshua Liendo | Canada | 23 October 2025 | Toronto | |
| 2 | 2 | 47.71 | Noè Ponti | Switzerland | 14 December 2024 | Budapest | |
| 3 | 3 | 47.78 | Caeleb Dressel | United States | 21 November 2020 | Budapest | |
| | 4 | 47.98 | Ponti #2 | | 13 April 2025 | Uster | |
| 4 | 5 | 48.08 | Chad le Clos | South Africa | 8 December 2016 | Windsor | |
| 5 | 6 | 48.10 | Maxime Grousset | France | 5 December 2025 | Lublin | |
| | 7 | 48.11 | Ponti #3 | | 5 December 2025 | Lublin | |
| 6 | 8 | 48.35 | Ilya Kharun | Canada | 23 October 2025 | Toronto | |
| | 9 | 48.38 | Ponti #4 | | 23 October 2025 | Toronto | |
| | 10 | 48.40 | Ponti #5 | | 18 October 2024 | Shanghai | |
| | 11 | 48.44 | le Clos #2 | | 4 December 2014 | Doha | |
| | 12 | 48.45 | le Clos #3 | | 21 November 2020 | Budapest | |
| | 12 | 48.45 | Kharun #2 | | 29 October 2026 | Westmont | |
| 7 | 14 | 48.47 | Tom Shields | United States | 21 November 2020 | Budapest | |
| | 14 | 48.47 | Ponti #6 | | 6 December 2023 | Otopeni | |
| | 14 | 48.47 | Ponti #7 | | 17 October 2025 | Westmont | |
| 7 | 14 | 48.47 | Tyler Ray | United States | 29 October 2026 | Westmont | |
| 9 | 18 | 48.48 | Yevgeny Korotyshkin | Russia | 15 November 2009 | Berlin | |
| | 19 | 48.50 | le Clos #4 | | 13 December 2018 | Hangzhou | |
| | 20 | 48.53 | Dressel #2 | | 4 September 2021 | Naples | |
| | 20 | 48.53 | Ponti #8 | | 10 October 2025 | Carmel | |
| | 22 | 48.56 | le Clos #5 | | 30 September 2014 | Hong Kong | |
| | 22 | 48.56 | Ray #2 | | 29 October 2026 | Westmont | |
| | 24 | 48.57 | Grousset #2 | | 14 December 2024 | Budapest | |
| | 24 | 48.57 | Dressel #3 | | 29 October 2026 | Westmont | |
| 10 | 24 | 48.57 | Luca Urlando | United States | 29 October 2026 | Westmont | |
| 11 | | 48.58 | Tomonobu Gomi | Japan | 12 October 2026 | Saga | |
| 12 | | 48.62 | Matthew Temple | Australia | 13 December 2023 | Adelaide | |
| 13 | | 48.64 | Matteo Rivolta | Italy | 27 November 2021 | Eindhoven | |
| 14 | | 48.99 | Nyls Korstanje | Netherlands | 24 October 2024 | Incheon | |
| 15 | | 49.02 | Simon Bucher | Austria | 29 November 2024 | Graz | |
| 16 | | 49.06 | Marius Kusch | Germany | 5 December 2019 | Glasgow | |
| 17 | | 49.07 | Ian Crocker | United States | 26 March 2004 | East Meadow | |
| 18 | | 49.08 | Michele Busa | Italy | 14 December 2024 | Budapest | |
| 19 | | 49.09 | Shoon Mitsunaga | Japan | 12 October 2026 | Saga | |
| 20 | | 49.10 | Coleman Stewart | United States | 4 September 2021 | Naples | |
| 21 | | 49.13 | Simone Stefanì | Italy | 1 December 2021 | Riccione | |
| 22 | | 49.14 | Dare Rose | United States | 13 December 2024 | Budapest | |
| 22 | | 49.14 | Youssef Ramadan | Egypt | 14 November 2026 | Sabadell | |
| 24 | | 49.18 | Marcin Cieślak | Poland | 21 November 2020 | Budapest | |
| 25 | | 49.19 | Milorad Čavić | Serbia | 12 December 2008 | Rijeka | |
| 25 | | 49.19 | Andrey Minakov | Russia | 13 December 2024 | Budapest | |

=== Women long course ===
- Correct as of September 2026

| Ath.# | Perf.# | Time | Athlete | Nation | Date | Place | Ref. |
|---|---|---|---|---|---|---|---|
| 1 | 1 | 54.33 | Gretchen Walsh | United States | 2 May 2026 | Fort Lauderdale | |
| | 2 | 54.60 | Walsh #2 | | 3 May 2025 | Fort Lauderdale | |
| | 3 | 54.73 | Walsh #3 | | 28 July 2025 | Singapore | |
| | 4 | 54.76 | Walsh #4 | | 5 June 2025 | Indianapolis | |
| | 5 | 54.82 | Walsh #5 | | 27 June 2026 | Rome | |
| | 6 | 55.00 | Walsh #6 | | 18 June 2026 | Indianapolis | |
| | 7 | 55.09 | Walsh #7 | | 3 May 2025 | Fort Lauderdale | |
| | 8 | 55.15 | Walsh #8 | | 14 August 2026 | Irvine | |
| | 9 | 55.18 | Walsh #9 | | 15 June 2024 | Indianapolis | |
| | 10 | 55.20 | Walsh #10 | | 7 March 2026 | Westmont | |
| | 11 | 55.22 | Walsh #11 | | 21 March 2026 | Shenzhen | |
| | 12 | 55.28 | Walsh #12 | | 14 August 2026 | Irvine | |
| | 13 | 55.29 | Walsh #13 | | 5 June 2025 | Indianapolis | |
| | 14 | 55.31 | Walsh #14 | | 16 June 2024 | Indianapolis | |
| | 14 | 55.31 | Walsh #15 | | 6 March 2026 | Westmont | |
| | 16 | 55.38 | Walsh #16 | | 27 July 2024 | Paris | |
| | 17 | 55.39 | Walsh #17 | | 2 May 2026 | Fort Lauderdale | |
| | 18 | 55.47 | Walsh #18 | | 27 June 2026 | Rome | |
| 2 | 19 | 55.48 | Sarah Sjöström | Sweden | 7 August 2016 | Rio de Janeiro | |
| 3 | 20 | 55.52 | Torri Huske | United States | 16 June 2024 | Indianapolis | |
| | 21 | 55.53 | Sjöström #2 | | 24 July 2017 | Budapest | |
| | 22 | 55.56 | Walsh #19 | | 18 June 2026 | Indianapolis | |
| 4 | 23 | 55.59 | Maggie Mac Neil | Canada | 26 July 2021 | Tokyo | |
| | 23 | 55.59 | Huske #2 | | 28 July 2024 | Paris | |
| | 23 | 55.59 | Walsh #20 | | 6 March 2026 | Westmont | |
| 5 | | 55.62 | Zhang Yufei | China | 29 September 2020 | Qingdao | |
| 5 | | 55.62 | Regan Smith | United States | 16 June 2024 | Indianapolis | |
| 7 | | 55.72 | Emma McKeon | Australia | 26 July 2021 | Tokyo | |
| 8 | | 55.84 | Roos Vanotterdijk | Belgium | 28 July 2025 | Singapore | |
| 9 | | 55.98 | Dana Vollmer | United States | 29 July 2012 | London | |
| 10 | | 56.07 | Liu Zige | China | 18 October 2009 | Jinan | |
| 11 | | 56.08 | Rikako Ikee | Japan | 11 August 2018 | Tokyo | |
| 12 | | 56.11 | Angelina Köhler | Germany | 11 February 2024 | Doha | |
| 13 | | 56.14 | Marie Wattel | France | 19 June 2022 | Budapest | |
| 14 | | 56.19 | Alexandria Perkins | Australia | 27 July 2025 | Singapore | |
| 15 | | 56.20 | Claire Curzan | United States | 10 April 2021 | Cary | |
| 16 | | 56.22 | Louise Hansson | Sweden | 26 July 2021 | Tokyo | |
| 17 | | 56.23 | Jessicah Schipper | Australia | 27 July 2009 | Rome | |
| 18 | | 56.33 | Mizuki Hirai | Japan | 22 June 2024 | Kanagawa | |
| 19 | | 56.37 | Kelsi Dahlia | United States | 24 July 2017 | Budapest | |
| 20 | | 56.41 | Yu Yiting | China | 23 September 2026 | Tokyo | |
| 21 | | 56.42 | Daria Klepikova | Russia | 27 July 2025 | Singapore | |
| 22 | | 56.43 | Kate Douglass | United States | 29 June 2023 | Indianapolis | |
| 23 | | 56.46 | Penny Oleksiak | Canada | 7 August 2016 | Rio de Janeiro | |
| 24 | | 56.51 | Jeanette Ottesen | Denmark | 18 August 2014 | Berlin | |
| 25 | | 56.61 | Inge de Bruijn | Netherlands | 17 September 2000 | Sydney | |
| 25 | | 56.61 | Chen Xinyi | China | 23 September 2014 | Incheon | |

=== Women short course ===
- Correct as of October 2026

| Ath.# | Perf.# | Time | Athlete | Nation | Date | Place | Ref. |
|---|---|---|---|---|---|---|---|
| 1 | 1 | 52.71 | Gretchen Walsh | United States | 14 December 2024 | Budapest | |
| | 2 | 52.87 | Walsh #2 | | 13 December 2024 | Budapest | |
| | 3 | 53.04 | Walsh #3 | | 16 October 2026 | Charlottesville | |
| | 4 | 53.10 | Walsh #4 | | 25 October 2025 | Toronto | |
| | 5 | 53.24 | Walsh #5 | | 13 December 2024 | Budapest | |
| | 6 | 53.50 | Walsh #6 | | 31 October 2026 | Westmont | |
| | 7 | 53.69 | Walsh #7 | | 12 October 2025 | Carmel | |
| | 8 | 53.72 | Walsh #8 | | 19 October 2025 | Westmont | |
| | 9 | 53.83 | Walsh #9 | | 25 October 2025 | Toronto | |
| 2 | 10 | 54.05 | Maggie Mac Neil | Canada | 18 December 2022 | Melbourne | |
| | 11 | 54.28 | Walsh #10 | | 19 October 2025 | Westmont | |
| | 12 | 54.43 | Walsh #11 | | 12 October 2025 | Carmel | |
| | 13 | 54.57 | Walsh #12 | | 31 October 2026 | Westmont | |
| 3 | 14 | 54.59 | Kelsi Dahlia | United States | 3 December 2021 | Eindhoven | |
| 4 | 15 | 54.61 | Sarah Sjöström | Sweden | 7 December 2014 | Doha | |
| 5 | 16 | 54.66 | Tessa Giele | Netherlands | 14 December 2024 | Budapest | |
| 6 | 17 | 54.75 | Torri Huske | United States | 18 December 2022 | Melbourne | |
| | 18 | 54.78 | Mac Neil #2 | | 30 October 2022 | Toronto | |
| 7 | 19 | 54.80 | Roos Vanotterdijk | Belgium | 16 October 2026 | Astana | |
| | 20 | 54.84 | Dahlia #2 | | 6 October 2018 | Budapest | |
| 8 | 21 | 54.87 | Louise Hansson | Sweden | 18 December 2022 | Melbourne | |
| 8 | 21 | 54.87 | Zhang Yufei | China | 27 October 2026 | Beijing | |
| | 23 | 54.89 | Dahlia #3 | | 20 November 2021 | Eindhoven | |
| | 24 | 54.91 | Sjöström #2 | | 30 September 2018 | Eindhoven | |
| 10 | 25 | 54.93 | Alexandria Perkins | Australia | 12 October 2025 | Carmel | |
| 11 | | 55.05 | Diane Bui Duyet | France | 12 December 2009 | Istanbul | |
| 12 | | 55.10 | Jeanette Ottesen | Denmark | 11 December 2015 | Indianapolis | |
| 12 | | 55.10 | Mizuki Hirai | Japan | 22 February 2025 | Sagamihara | |
| 14 | | 55.12 | Katinka Hosszú | Hungary | 11 December 2016 | Windsor | |
| 15 | | 55.15 | Regan Smith | United States | 16 October 2026 | Charlottesville | |
| 16 | | 55.17 | Yu Yiting | China | 16 October 2026 | Astana | |
| 17 | | 55.25 | Lu Ying | China | 7 December 2014 | Doha | |
| 18 | | 55.30 | Alicia Coutts | Australia | 9 November 2013 | Tokyo | |
| 19 | | 55.31 | Rikako Ikee | Japan | 11 November 2018 | Tokyo | |
| 20 | | 55.32 | Béryl Gastaldello | France | 15 November 2020 | Budapest | |
| 21 | | 55.39 | Emma McKeon | Australia | 26 October 2019 | Budapest | |
| 21 | | 55.39 | Claire Curzan | United States | 21 December 2021 | Abu Dhabi | |
| 21 | | 55.39 | Laura Lahtinen | Finland | 4 December 2025 | Lublin | |
| 24 | | 55.43 | Felicity Galvez | Australia | 19 December 2010 | Dubai | |
| 25 | | 55.50 | Angelina Köhler | Germany | 9 December 2023 | Otopeni | |
| 25 | | 55.50 | Ellen Walshe | Ireland | 13 December 2024 | Budapest | |

== Olympic champions ==
=== Men ===
| Edition | Winner | Time | Notes | Ref. |
|---|---|---|---|---|
| Mexico City 1968 | Doug Russell (USA) | 55.9 | OR | |
| (West Germany) Munich 1972 | Mark Spitz (USA) | 54.27 | WR | |
| (Canada) Montreal 1976 | Matt Vogel (USA) | 54.35 | | |
| (Soviet Union) Moscow 1980 | Pär Arvidsson (SWE) | 54.92 | | |
| (United States) Los Angeles 1984 | Michael Gross (FRG) | 53.08 | WR | |
| (South Korea) Seoul 1988 | Anthony Nesty (SUR) | 53.00 | OR | |
| (Spain) Barcelona 1992 | Pablo Morales (USA) | 53.32 | | |
| (United States) Atlanta 1996 | Denis Pankratov (RUS) | 52.27 | WR | |
| (Australia) Sydney 2000 | Lars Frölander (SWE) | 52.00 | (Note: Geoff Huegill set an Olympic record of 51.96 in the semifinals.) | |
| (Greece) Athens 2004 | Michael Phelps (USA) | 51.25 | OR | |
| (China) Beijing 2008 | Michael Phelps (USA) | 50.58 | OR | |
| (United Kingdom) London 2012 | Michael Phelps (USA) | 51.21 | | |
| (Brazil) Rio de Janeiro 2016 | Joseph Schooling (SGP) | 50.39 | OR | |
| (Japan) Tokyo 2020 | Caeleb Dressel (USA) | 49.45 | WR | |
| (France) Paris 2024 | Kristóf Milák (HUN) | 49.90 | | |

=== Women ===
| Edition | Winner | Time | Notes | Ref. |
|---|---|---|---|---|
| (Australia) Melbourne 1956 | Shelley Mann (USA) | 1:11.0 | OR | |
| (Italy) Rome 1960 | Carolyn Schuler (USA) | 1:09.5 | OR | |
| (Japan) Tokyo 1964 | Sharon Stouder (USA) | 1:04.7 | WR | |
| Mexico City 1968 | Lyn McClements (AUS) | 1:05.5 | | |
| (West Germany) Munich 1972 | Mayumi Aoki (JPN) | 1:03.34 | WR | |
| (Canada) Montreal 1976 | Kornelia Ender (GDR) | 1:00.13 | =WR | |
| (Soviet Union) Moscow 1980 | Caren Metschuck (GDR) | 1:00.42 | | |
| (United States) Los Angeles 1984 | Mary T. Meagher (USA) | 59.26 | (Note: Mary T. Meagher set an Olympic record of 59.05 in the heats.) | |
| (South Korea) Seoul 1988 | Kristin Otto (GDR) | 59.00 | OR | |
| (Spain) Barcelona 1992 | Qian Hong (CHN) | 58.62 | OR | |
| (United States) Atlanta 1996 | Amy Van Dyken (USA) | 59.13 | | |
| (Australia) Sydney 2000 | Inge de Bruijn (NED) | 56.61 | WR | |
| (Greece) Athens 2004 | Petria Thomas (AUS) | 57.72 | | |
| (China) Beijing 2008 | Libby Trickett (AUS) | 56.73 | | |
| (United Kingdom) London 2012 | Dana Vollmer (USA) | 55.98 | WR | |
| (Brazil) Rio de Janeiro 2016 | Sarah Sjöström (SWE) | 55.48 | WR | |
| (Japan) Tokyo 2020 | Maggie Mac Neil (CAN) | 55.59 | | |
| (France) Paris 2024 | Torri Huske (USA) | 55.59 | (Note: Gretchen Walsh set an Olympic record of 55.38 in the semifinals.) | |

== World champions (long course) ==
=== Men ===
| Edition | Winner | Time | Notes | Ref. |
|---|---|---|---|---|
| (Socialist Federal Republic of Yugoslavia) Belgrade 1973 | Bruce Robertson (CAN) | 55.69 | CR | |
| (Colombia) Cali 1975 | Gregory Jagenburg (USA) | 55.63 | CR | |
| (West Germany) West Berlin 1978 | Joe Bottom (USA) | 54.30 | (Note: Joe Bottom set a championship record of 54.21 in the heats.) | |
| (Ecuador) Guayaquil 1982 | Matt Gribble (USA) | 53.88 | CR | |
| (Spain) Madrid 1986 | Pablo Morales (USA) | 53.54 | CR | |
| (Australia) Perth 1991 | Anthony Nesty (SUR) | 53.29 | CR | |
| (Italy) Rome 1994 | Rafał Szukała (POL) | 53.51 | | |
| (Australia) Perth 1998 | Michael Klim (AUS) | 52.25 | CR | |
| (Japan) Fukuoka 2001 | Lars Frölander (SWE) | 52.10 | CR | |
| (Spain) Barcelona 2003 | Ian Crocker (USA) | 50.98 | WR | |
| (Canada) Montreal 2005 | Ian Crocker (USA) | 50.40 | WR | |
| (Australia) Melbourne 2007 | Michael Phelps (USA) | 50.77 | | |
| (Italy) Rome 2009 | Michael Phelps (USA) | 49.82 | WR | |
| (China) Shanghai 2011 | Michael Phelps (USA) | 50.71 | | |
| (Spain) Barcelona 2013 | Chad le Clos (RSA) | 51.06 | | |
| (Russia) Kazan 2015 | Chad le Clos (RSA) | 50.56 | | |
| (Hungary) Budapest 2017 | Caeleb Dressel (USA) | 49.86 | | |
| (South Korea) Gwangju 2019 | Caeleb Dressel (USA) | 49.66 | (Note: Caeleb Dressel set a world record of 49.50 in the semifinals.) | |
| (Hungary) Budapest 2022 | Kristóf Milák (HUN) | 50.14 | | |
| (Japan) Fukuoka 2023 | Maxime Grousset (FRA) | 50.14 | | |
| (Qatar) Doha 2024 | Diogo Ribeiro (POR) | 51.17 | | |
| Singapore 2025 | Maxime Grousset (FRA) | 49.62 | | |

=== Women ===
| Edition | Winner | Time | Notes | Ref. |
|---|---|---|---|---|
| (Socialist Federal Republic of Yugoslavia) Belgrade 1973 | Kornelia Ender (GDR) | 1:02.53 | CR | |
| (Colombia) Cali 1975 | Kornelia Ender (GDR) | 1:01.24 | WR | |
| (West Germany) West Berlin 1978 | Joan Pennington (USA) | 1:00.20 | CR | |
| (Ecuador) Guayaquil 1982 | Mary T. Meagher (USA) | 59.41 | CR | |
| (Spain) Madrid 1986 | Kornelia Gressler (GDR) | 59.51 | | |
| (Australia) Perth 1991 | Qian Hong (CHN) | 59.68 | | |
| (Italy) Rome 1994 | Liu Limin (CHN) | 58.98 | CR | |
| (Australia) Perth 1998 | Jenny Thompson (USA) | 58.46 | CR | |
| (Japan) Fukuoka 2001 | Petria Thomas (AUS) | 58.27 | CR | |
| (Spain) Barcelona 2003 | Jenny Thompson (USA) | 57.96 | CR | |
| (Canada) Montreal 2005 | Jessicah Schipper (AUS) | 57.23 | CR | |
| (Australia) Melbourne 2007 | Libby Lenton (AUS) | 57.15 | CR | |
| (Italy) Rome 2009 | Sarah Sjöström (SWE) | 56.06 | WR | |
| (China) Shanghai 2011 | Dana Vollmer (USA) | 56.87 | | |
| (Spain) Barcelona 2013 | Sarah Sjöström (SWE) | 56.53 | | |
| (Russia) Kazan 2015 | Sarah Sjöström (SWE) | 55.64 | WR | |
| (Hungary) Budapest 2017 | Sarah Sjöström (SWE) | 55.53 | CR | |
| (South Korea) Gwangju 2019 | Maggie Mac Neil (CAN) | 55.83 | | |
| (Hungary) Budapest 2022 | Torri Huske (USA) | 55.64 | | |
| (Japan) Fukuoka 2023 | Zhang Yufei (CHN) | 56.12 | | |
| (Qatar) Doha 2024 | Angelina Köhler (GER) | 56.28 | | |
| Singapore 2025 | Gretchen Walsh (USA) | 54.73 | CR | |

== World champions (short course) ==
=== Men ===
| Edition | Winner | Time | Notes | Ref. |
|---|---|---|---|---|
| (Spain) Palma de Mallorca 1993 | Miloš Milošević (CRO) | 52.79 | CR | |
| (Brazil) Rio de Janeiro 1995 | Scott Miller (AUS) | 52.38 | CR | |
| (Sweden) Gothenburg 1997 | Lars Frölander (SWE) | 51.95 | CR | |
| Hong Kong 1999 | Lars Frölander (SWE) | 51.45 | CR | |
| (Greece) Athens 2000 | Lars Frölander (SWE) | 50.44 | WR | |
| (Russia) Moscow 2002 | Geoff Huegill (AUS) | 50.95 | | |
| (United States) Indianapolis 2004 | Ian Crocker (USA) | 50.18 | CR | |
| (China) Shanghai 2006 | Kaio de Almeida (BRA) | 51.07 | | |
| (United Kingdom) Manchester 2008 | Peter Mankoč (SLO) | 50.04 | CR | |
| (United Arab Emirates) Dubai 2010 | Yevgeny Korotyshkin (RUS) | 50.23 | | |
| (Turkey) Istanbul 2012 | Chad le Clos (RSA) | 48.82 | CR | |
| (Qatar) Doha 2014 | Chad le Clos (RSA) | 48.44 | WR | |
| (Canada) Windsor 2016 | Chad le Clos (RSA) | 48.08 | WR | |
| (China) Hangzhou 2018 | Chad le Clos (RSA) | 48.50 | | |
| (United Arab Emirates) Abu Dhabi 2021 | Matteo Rivolta (ITA) | 48.87 | | |
| (Australia) Melbourne 2022 | Chad le Clos (RSA) | 48.59 | | |
| (Hungary) Budapest 2024 | Noè Ponti (SUI) | 47.71 | WR | |

=== Women ===
| Edition | Winner | Time | Notes | Ref. |
|---|---|---|---|---|
| (Spain) Palma de Mallorca 1993 | Susie O'Neill (AUS) | 59.19 | CR | |
| (Brazil) Rio de Janeiro 1995 | Liu Limin (CHN) | 58.68 | WR | |
| (Sweden) Gothenburg 1997 | Jenny Thompson (USA) | 57.79 | WR | |
| Hong Kong 1999 | Jenny Thompson (USA) | 57.65 | CR | |
| (Greece) Athens 2000 | Jenny Thompson (USA) | 57.67 | (Note: Jenny Thompson set a world record of 56.56 in the semifinals.) | |
| (Russia) Moscow 2002 | Martina Moravcová (SVK) | 57.04 | | |
| (United States) Indianapolis 2004 | Martina Moravcová (SVK) | 57.38 | | |
| (China) Shanghai 2006 | Libby Lenton (AUS) | 56.61 | | |
| (United Kingdom) Manchester 2008 | Felicity Galvez (AUS) | 55.89 | WR | |
| (United Arab Emirates) Dubai 2010 | Felicity Galvez (AUS) | 55.43 | CR | |
| (Turkey) Istanbul 2012 | Ilaria Bianchi (ITA) | 56.13 | | |
| (Qatar) Doha 2014 | Sarah Sjöström (SWE) | 54.61 | WR | |
| (Canada) Windsor 2016 | Katinka Hosszú (HUN) | 55.12 | | |
| (China) Hangzhou 2018 | Kelsi Dahlia (USA) | 55.01 | | |
| (United Arab Emirates) Abu Dhabi 2021 | Maggie Mac Neil (CAN) | 55.04 | | |
| (Australia) Melbourne 2022 | Maggie Mac Neil (CAN) | 54.05 | WR | |
| (Hungary) Budapest 2024 | Gretchen Walsh (USA) | 52.71 | WR | |
