= Tineke Lagerberg =

Dutch swimmer (born 1941)

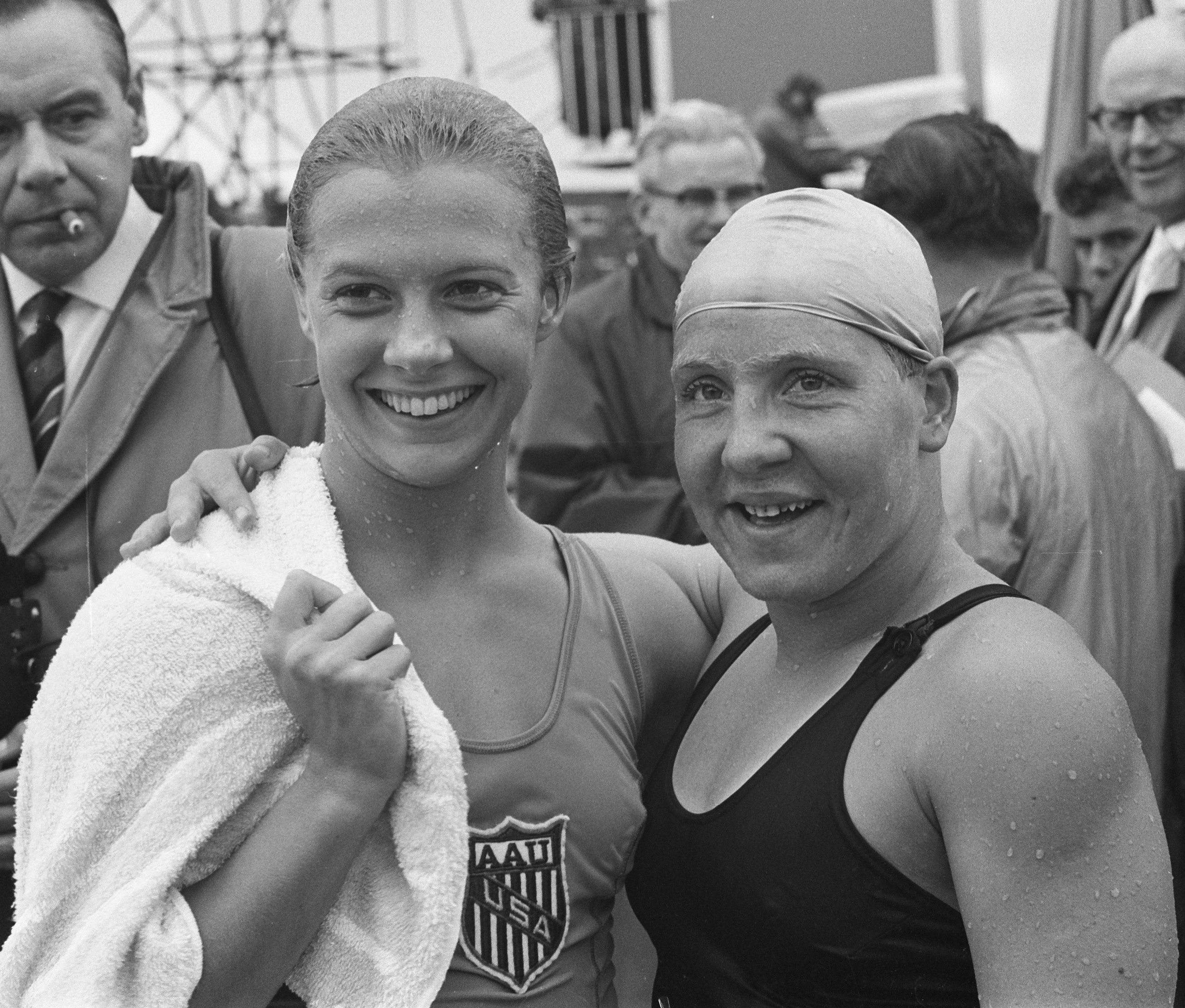
- Becky Collins and Tineke Lagerberg (right) in 1961

Personal information
- Born: 30 January 1941 (age 85) Bussum, Netherlands
- Height: 1.50 m (4 ft 11 in)
- Weight: 55 kg (121 lb)

Sport
- Sport: Swimming
- Strokes: Freestyle, butterfly
- Club: ZV Naarden, Naarden
Medal record
Representing the Netherlands
Olympic Games
Bronze medal – third place	1960 Rome	400 m freestyle
European Championships
Gold medal – first place	1958 Budapest	100 m butterfly
Gold medal – first place	1958 Budapest	4×100 m freestyle

Catharina Bernadetta Jacoba ("Tineke") Lagerberg (born 30 January 1941) is a retired Dutch swimmer who won the bronze medal in the 400 m freestyle at the 1960 Summer Olympics in a time of 4:56.9. She was also part of the Dutch team that broke the 4×100 m medley Olympic record in the preliminaries; however, they finished fourth in the final. Lagerberg broke the world record in the women's 200 m butterfly on 13 September 1958 in Naarden, Netherlands. She was also part of the Dutch relay team that set a new world record in the 4×100 m medley in the same year.

Records
Preceded by (United States) Nancy Ramey	Women's 200 metre butterfly world record holder (long course); 13 September 1958 – 19 July 1959	Succeeded by (United States) Becky Collins
