= Nina Harmer =

American swimmer (born 1945)

Personal information
- Full name: Nina Adams Harmer
- National team: United States
- Born: December 11, 1945 (age 80) Philadelphia, Pennsylvania, U.S.
- Height: 5 ft 8 in (1.73 m)
- Weight: 141 lb (64 kg)

Sport
- Sport: Swimming
- Strokes: Backstroke
- Club: Vesper Boat Club
- Coach: Mary Freeman Kelly
Medal record
Women's swimming
Representing the United States
Pan American Games
Gold medal – first place	1963 São Paulo	100 m backstroke

Nina Adams Harmer (born December 11, 1945), also known by her married name Nina Thompson, is an American former competition swimmer, two-time Olympian, and Pan American Games gold medalist.

Harmer was born in Philadelphia, Pennsylvania, and trained with the Vesper Boat Club in Philadelphia under Hall of Fame Coach Mary Freeman Kelly, who had started the program in 1955.

== National swimming career highlights ==
At the August 1961 Women's Swimming and Diving Championships in Philadelphia, she won both the 100 and 200-meter backstroke events, as well as swimming as a member of the 400-meter freestyle relay. On August 22, 1963, while swimming with the Vesper Boat Club, she lowered the National AAU record in the 100-yard backstroke a full second to 1:04.2 at the Badger Swim Club Water Carnival Meet in Larchmont, New York.

Summarizing her career, between 1961 and 1965 she won eight national swimming championships, consisting of four individual and four relays. By 1963, she had been a National AAU backstroke champion four times.

== '60 Rome Olympics ==
As a 14-year-old, she represented the United States at the 1960 Summer Olympics in Rome. She competed in the women's 100-meter backstroke, but did not advance beyond the preliminary heats. Swimming a 1:13.8, she had the 15th fastest time of all the preliminary swimmers.

=== 63 Pan Am games ===
At the 1963 Pan American Games in São Paulo, Brazil, she won the gold medal in the women's 100-meter backstroke.

=== High school graduation ===
In 1963, she graduated Springside Chestnut Hill Academy, an old and well-established Co-ed independent college preparatory day school in Chestnut Hill, Philadelphia, Pennsylvania. She married by the age of twenty. In August 1965, she demonstrated the Backstroke at the Badger Sports Club Water Carnival in Larchmont, New York, outside Mamaronek.

== '64 Tokyo Olympics ==
=== 4x100 medley relay ===
A year later at the 1964 Summer Olympics in Tokyo, Japan, Harmer swam for the gold medal-winning U.S. team in the preliminary heats of the women's 4×100-meter medley relay. She did not receive a medal under the 1964 international swimming rules because she did not swim in the relay event final.

=== Women's 100-meter backstroke ===
Individually, she also competed in the women's 100-meter backstroke, finishing fifth in the event final with a time of 1:09.4, and though it was her best record time, she finished behind American teammates Cathy Ferguson (first), and Ginny Duenkel (third).

=== Post-Olympic competition ===
She continued to swim after the Olympics, and at the Senior Women's AAU Swimming Championships in April, 1966, while still swimming for the Vesper Boat Club she helped set a record of 4:06.0 for the 440-yard medley relay with teammates Jane Barkman, Lee Davis and Martha Randall.

Swimming with the District of Columbia Masters in her late twenties, she was a United States Masters All American swimmer with first place age group finishes in backstroke and medley events in both 1974 and 1975 and was nationally ranked with 16 top ten age group swims from 1974 to 1976.

In the late 1980s she was living in the Maryland area, around Dorchester County where she had formerly swum for D.C. and Maryland Masters Swimming, and may have served as an area director and volunteer for Maryland's Spring Midshore Special Olympics held at Cambridge South Dorchester High School in April 1989.

== Honors ==
In 1995, she was inducted into the Springside Hill Academy Athletic Hall of Fame. Her primary youth coach Mary Freeman Kelly Spitzer said that one of her greatest qualities, "was that even while she was very young, she maintained a balanced perspective on her activities and interests." Despite her demanding swimming career, "she had also her allegiance to her school life..but she more than managed to keep afloat in both worlds without drowning.”
