= Mary Stewart (swimmer) =

Canadian swimmer and Olympian

Mary Beth Stewart
Personal information
- Full name: Mary Beth Pauline Stewart
- Born: December 8, 1945 (age 80) Vancouver, British Columbia, Canada
- Height: 154 cm (5 ft 1 in)
- Weight: 44 kg (97 lb)

Sport
- Country: Canada
- Sport: Swimming
- Events: 100 freestyle, butterfly
- Strokes: Butterfly, freestyle
- Club: Vancouver Area Swim Club (VASC); Canadian Dolphins, Vancouver, B.C.
- Coach: Percy Norman (VASC); Howard Firby (VASC, Dolphins)
Medal record
Women's swimming
Representing Canada
Pan American Games
Silver medal – second place	1963 São Paulo	100 m freestyle
Silver medal – second place	1963 São Paulo	100 m butterfly
Silver medal – second place	1963 São Paulo	4x100 m freestyle
Silver medal – second place	1963 São Paulo	4x100 m medley
Commonwealth Games
Gold medal – first place	1962 Perth	100 m butterfly

Mary Beth Pauline Stewart (born December 8, 1945), also known by her married name Mary Stewart McIlwaine, is a Canadian former competitive swimmer who swam in High School for the Canadian Dolphins club and competed for Canada in freestyle events at the 1960 and 1964 Olympics. She twice broke the long-course world record in the women's 100-metre butterfly in the early 1960s.

== Early life ==
Stewart was born December 8, 1945, in Vancouver, British Columbia to father William Stewart. Both her mother and father William worked as teachers, and her sister Helen and her husband Ted were also teachers. She first learned swimming fundamentals at the age of six from 1936 Canadian freestyle Olympian Robert Hooper. In competition and training, she likely swam briefly for the Vancouver Area Swim Club through 1956 under Coach Percy Norman and Assistant Coach Howard Firby. By 1956-7, she swam for Hall of Fame Coach Howard Firby with her equally talented sister Helen, as one of the original seven members of the highly competitive Canadian Dolphins Swim Club. Firby founded the Canadian Dolphins with Mary's father William in 1955, and coached the highly competitive program from 1955-1967, winning six Canadian Team national championships during his coaching tenure. Skilled in the study of anatomy and aerodynamics, Mary's coach Harold Firby made an involved study of the new butterfly stroke, attempting to improve his swimmer's positioning and technique, and passed his knowledge technique to Mary. A serious student, Mary attended an accelerated program at Kitsilano Secondary School an 8-12 public school known for quality academics and a strong sports program. She planned to attend the University of British Columbia.

Mary studied dance from the age of four. A talented performer, through much of her swimming career from 1956-1963 she was the first person to perform as the University of British Columbia's mascot Leo the Lion at BC Lion home games held at Vancouver’s Empire Stadium. Beginning around the age of 10 she performed jumps, cartwheels, flips and handstands, as Leo the lion primarily during pre-game and half-time intervals. Beginning around 1955, she was tutored in choreography at the Vancouver studio of Grace Macdonald, who worked for the British Columbia Lions coordinating their cheerleaders.

In July 1962, Mary set a world record for the Women's 110-yard butterfly of 1:07.3. Mary twice broke the world record in the women's 100-metre butterfly in the early 1960s. She also competed in freestyle events as a member of the Canadian national team in major international championships. At one time, she held every Canadian record in freestyle and butterfly events for all distances up to 220 yards, and in 1961-2, held the American records for both the 100-meter and 100-yard butterfly.

== 1960 Rome, 1964 Tokyo Olympics ==
As a 14-year-old, she represented Canada in the 1960 Summer Olympics in Rome, where she finished eighth in the women's 100-metre freestyle with a time of 1:05.5, around 4.3 seconds out of medal contention. Just missing the finals, she competed in the preliminary hears of the women's 4x100-metre medley relay event swimming anchor and placing 9th overall with a combined team time of 4:59.5.

In her final international appearance for Canada at the 1964 Summer Olympics in Tokyo, she finished 28th in the 100 metres Freestyle, 7th in the 4 × 100 metres Freestyle Relay with a combined team time of 4:15.9, 8th in the 100 metres butterfly with a time of 1:10.0 and 6th in the 4 × 100 metres Medley Relay, making the finals with a combined team time of 4:49.9.

Mary Stewart married Robert McIllwayne after college.

=== International competition highlights ===
At the late November, 1962 Commonwealth Games in Perth, Western Australia, she won the gold medal in the women's 100-metre butterfly, and later toured New Zealand with the team. At the 1963 Pan American Games in São Paulo, Brazil, Stewart enjoyed a four-medal performance, garnering silver medals for her second-place performances in the 100-metre freestyle, 100-metre butterfly, 4x100-metre freestyle relay, and the 4x100-metre medley relay.

Despite being of Canadian nationality, she won the ASA National British Championships in the 110-yard butterfly in 1963.

In a family with several educators including her mother, Mary worked as a teacher in Vancouver for 38 years.

=== Honors ===
In both 1961 and 1962, Mary won the Velma Springstead Trophy as Canada’s outstanding female athlete of the year. She was admitted to the British Columbia Sports Hall of Fame in 1966. With recognition of her contributions to the sport growing with the passage of time, in 1975 she was admitted to the Canadian Olympic Hall of Fame, and later became a member of the Swimming Canada Circle of Excellence in the Spring of 2025.

== Personal life ==
She is the sister of former swimmer Helen Stewart.

== See also ==
- World record progression 100 metres butterfly

Records
Preceded by Janice Andrew	Women's 100-metre butterfly world record-holder (long course); August 12, 1961 – August 12, 1961	Succeeded by Susan Doerr
Preceded by Susan Doerr	Women's 100-metre butterfly world record-holder (long course); July 28, 1962 – August 16, 1963	Succeeded by Kathy Ellis
