= Kathy Ellis =

American swimmer (born 1946)

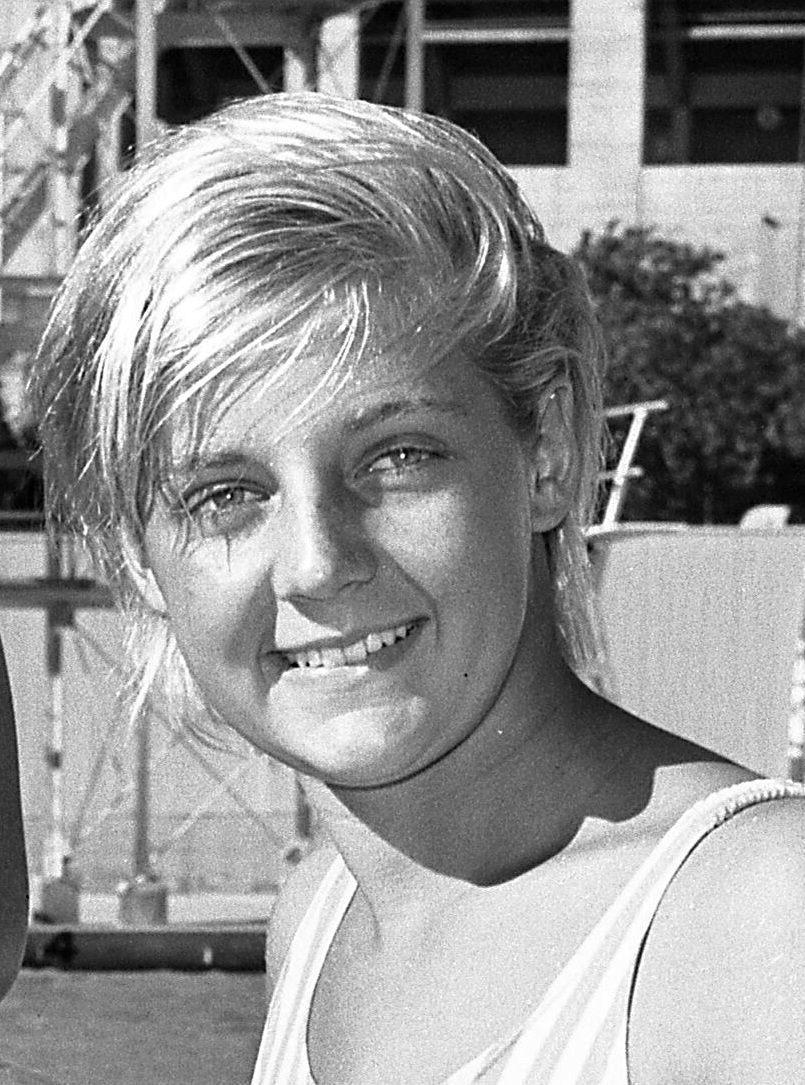
- Ellis at 17 at the Tokyo Olympics in September, 1964

Personal information
- Full name: Kathleen Ellis
- Nickname: "Kathy"
- National team: United States
- Born: November 28, 1946 (age 79) Indianapolis, Indiana, U.S.
- Height: 5 ft 7 in (1.70 m)
- Weight: 130 lb (59 kg)
- Spouses: Carl John Hood; Douglas Landsgraf

Sport
- Sport: Swimming
- Strokes: Butterfly, freestyle
- Club: Indianapolis Athletic Club (IAC); Riviera Swim Club (RSC)
- Coach: Gene Lee (IAC, RSC); Peter Daland '64 Olympics; James Counsilman
Medal record
Women's swimming
Representing the United States
Olympic Games
Gold medal – first place	1964 Tokyo	4×100 m medley
Gold medal – first place	1964 Tokyo	4×100 m freestyle
Bronze medal – third place	1964 Tokyo	100 m butterfly
Bronze medal – third place	1964 Tokyo	100 m freestyle
Pan American Games
Gold medal – first place	1963 São Paulo	100 m butterfly
Bronze medal – third place	1963 São Paulo	100 m freestyle

Kathleen Ellis, (born November 28, 1946), also known by her married names Kathy Hood and Kathy Landsgraf is an American former competition swimmer for the Riviera Swim Club, a 1964 Tokyo Olympic champion in the 4×100-meter freestyle and medley relay events, and a former world record-holder in three events. Graduating Indiana University in 1968 with a degree in Nursing, she later married, and coached swimming at the Riviera Club replacing her former coach Gene Lee. She also coached at Butler University, where Lee had coached, and later at Wabash College.

== Early swimming ==
Ellis was born on November 26, 1946, in Indianapolis, Indiana to Mr. and Mrs. Donald Ellis, who were avid golfers and able athletes and wanted Kathy and her sister Maddie to learn to swim competently while they enjoyed their own avocation. Kathy and her sister swam first with the Indianapolis Athletic Club (IAC) beginning in elementary school. Ellis's Coach Gene Lee began working at the IAC around 1956. When Coach Lee left the IAC for the Riviera Club in 1962, Kathy and her sister followed. Lee became an American Swimming Coaches Association Hall of Fame honoree. An outstanding program, Lee coached the Riviera Club from 1962 to 1977 mentoring four Pan American and Olympic participants in his career. As a young swimmer, at only 14, Kathy took her first National Championship in the 100-yard butterfly in 1961. At the 1963 U.S. Nationals, she set a new world record mark for the 100-meter butterfly with a time of 1:06.5.

== 1960 Olympic trials ==
At only 13 at her first U.S. Olympic Trials in Detroit, Michigan in 1960, she did not advance out of the preliminaries, yet finished tenth in the 100-meter butterfly event, just missing the eight person final round.

Ellis captured a bronze medal at the 1963 Summer Pan American Games in São Paulo, in the 100-meter butterfly, and a bronze medal in the 100-meter freestyle.

== 1964 Tokyo Olympics ==
Ellis qualified for the 1964 Olympics at the Trials in Astoria pool, in Queens, New York, on August 29, 1964, after swimming a time of 1:00.4 in the 100-meter freestyle, placing second only .1 seconds behind Sharon Stouder, the reigning world record holder in the event. Ellis's time was below the listed American record. He sister Maddie missed making the U.S. team by one-tenth of a second. Maddie Ellis would later win a gold medal at the 1967 World University Games. The Head Women's Coach for the 1964 Olympics was Peter Daland, who coached the swim teams at the Los Angeles Athletic Club and the University of Southern California, and worked with Ellis and the U.S. Women's Olympic team during their pre-Olympic training in Los Angeles and later in Tokyo.

After qualifying in the trials, Ellis represented the United States as a 17-year-old at the October Olympics in Tokyo, Japan. She won two gold medals as a member of the winning U.S. teams in the women's 4×100-meter freestyle relay and women's 4×100-meter medley relay, with both events setting new world records. Individually, she also received two bronze medals for her third-place finishes in the women's 100-meter freestyle with a time of 1:00.8 and the women's 100-meter butterfly with a time of 1:06.0.

In the 400-meter freestyle relay, Ellis swam anchor and teamed with Sharon Stouder, Lillian "Pokey" Watson, and Donna de Varona. The 4×100-meter medley relay consisted of Cathy Ferguson, Cynthia Goyette, and Sharon Stouder, with Ellis swimming anchor. Their world record time was 4:33.9. On the breaststroke leg of the medley relay the Soviet team had a slight lead, but American teammate Sharon Stouder opened a 2 1/2 length lead in her butterfly leg, and Ellis was able to maintain the lead on the final leg to capture the gold medal.

=== Indiana University ===
After the Olympics, Ellis attended Indiana University, graduating in 1969 with a major in Nursing. She was active in the national sorority, Kappa Alpha Theta. She did not compete as a swimmer, but did train for a period. Women's scholarships were not available at the time, and Ellis was not interested in Synchronized swimming, the only women's swimming team available at Indiana at the time.

While at Indiana University, Ellis remained in training and competition for a few years, and was managed by Indiana's Hall of Fame Coach James "Doc" Counsilman. She married shortly after college and became Kathy Ellis Hood.

Shortly after graduating Indiana University, Kathy married Carl John Hood on the evening of Thursday, July 3, 1969, at Meridian Street United Methodist Church in Indianapolis. Hood was a graduate of Butler University, where Kathy would later coach. Kathy's sister Madeline Ellis, an accomplished competitive swimmer who had trained with Kathy, was Maid of Honor. A reception was held at the Riviera Club, where Kathy had trained as a swimmer, and would later coach swimming. In the late 1970s, Kathy later married Doug Landsgraf who was coaching swimming at Butler College, and also coached soccer.

=== Honors ===
Ellis was inducted into the International Swimming Hall of Fame as an "Honor Swimmer" in 1991.

She was voted "Woman of the Year", in 1965 by Theta Sigma Phi professional fraternity for women in journalism.

Though she did not compete for Indiana University, she was honored by the school on their "Wall of Fame" in August, 1982, at the newly opened Indiana Natatorium, a large modern facility. Also honored on the wall were her coach Gene Lee, who coached her at the Indianapolis Athletic Club and Riviera Club, and James "Doc" Counselman, who coached her for a short period while she was in college. Counselman had also coached at the Indianapolis Athletic Club in the 1950s and 1960s.

=== Coaching ===
Ellis coached the Riviera Swim Team, when her former Coach Gene Lee died in 1977, and also began coaching Butler University Men's swim team, a position that had formerly been held by few women, as the Division I school was highly competitive. She became one of the few women to coach a Division 1 college team. After coaching at Butler, she had a successful head coaching position with Crawfordsville, Indiana's Wabash College men's swimming program.

She later lived in Carmel, Indiana with her husband Doug Landsgraf and two children, a boy, and a girl, who excelled as soccer players.

== See also ==
- List of members of the International Swimming Hall of Fame
- List of Olympic medalists in swimming (women)
- World record progression 100 metres butterfly
- World record progression 4 × 100 metres freestyle relay
- World record progression 4 × 100 metres medley relay
