= Swimming at the 1959 Pan American Games – Women's 100 metre backstroke =

Women's 100 metre backstroke at the I959 Pan American Games
- Venue: -
- Dates: September 5 (preliminaries), September 6 (finals)

Medalists
Gold medal	Carin Cone	United States
Silver medal	Sara Barber	Canada
Bronze medal	Christine Kluter	United States

The women's 100 metre backstroke competition of the swimming events at the 1959 Pan American Games took place on 5 September (preliminaries) and 6 September (final). The last Pan American Games champion was Leonore Fisher of Canada.

This race consisted of two lengths of the pool, all in backstroke.

== Results ==
All times are in minutes and seconds.

KEY:	q	Fastest non-qualifiers	Q	Qualified	GR	Games record	NR	National record	PB	Personal best	SB	Seasonal best

=== Heats ===
The first round was held on September 5.

Rank	Heat	Name	Nationality	Time	Notes
1	-	Sara Barber	Canada	1:12.7	Q, GR
-	-	-	-	-	Q
-	-	-	-	-	Q
-	-	-	-	-	Q
-	-	-	-	-	Q
-	-	-	-	-	Q
-	-	-	-	-	Q
-	-	-	-	-	Q

=== Final ===
The final was held on September 6.

Rank	Name	Nationality	Time	Notes
1st place, gold medalist(s)	Carin Cone	United States	1:12.2	GR
2nd place, silver medalist(s)	Sara Barber	Canada	1:12.3	
3rd place, bronze medalist(s)	Christine Kluter	United States	1:12.4	
4	Lynn Burke	United States	1:13.8	
5	Lynn Scott	Canada	1:17.1	
6	Dulce Okayama	Brazil	1:22.9	
6	-	-	-	
8	-	-	-	
