= Marta Skupilová =

Czechoslovak swimmer (1938–2017)

Personal information
- Born: 28 July 1938 Bratislava, Slovakia
- Died: 25 August 2017 (aged 79)
Medal record
Representing Czechoslovakia
European Championships
Bronze medal – third place	1958 Budapest	100 m butterfly

Marta Skupilová (28 July 1938 – August 25, 2017) was a Czech swimmer who won a bronze medal in the 100 m butterfly at the 1958 European Aquatics Championships. She also competed in this event at the 1956 Summer Olympics, but did not reach the final.

She died on August 25, 2017, at the age of 79.
