= Susan Doerr =

American swimmer (1945–1972)

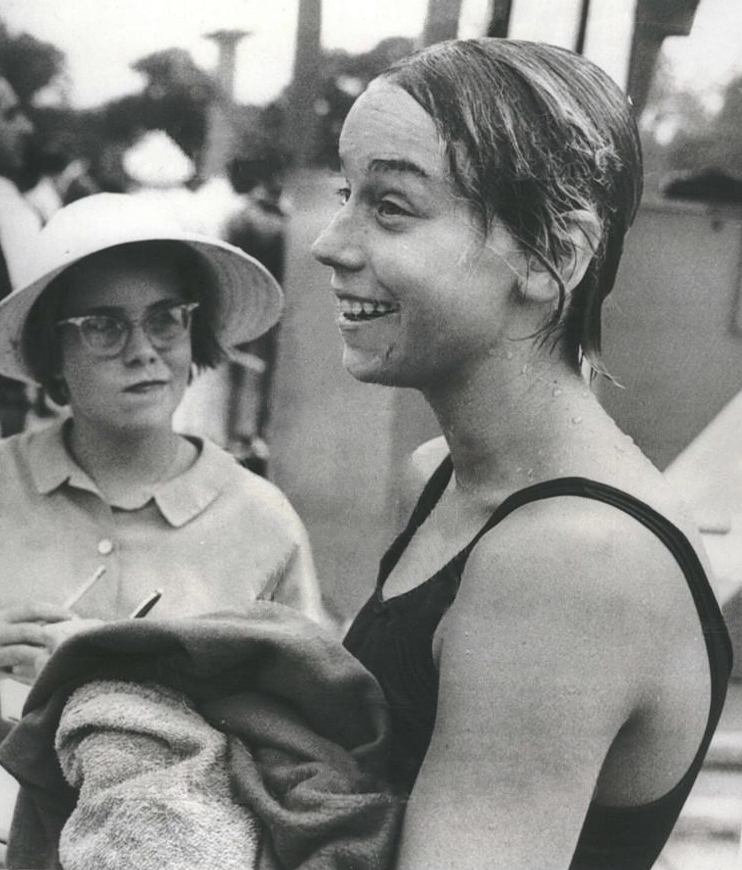
- Doerr in 1961

Personal information
- Full name: Susan Elizabeth Doerr
- Nicknames: "Susie," "Sue"
- National team: United States
- Born: January 13, 1945 Bryn Mawr, Pennsylvania, U.S.
- Died: February 18, 1972 (aged 27) New York City, New York
- Height: 5 ft 5 in (1.65 m)
- Weight: 110 lb (50 kg)

Sport
- Sport: Swimming
- Strokes: Freestyle, butterfly
- Club: Vesper Boat Club
- College team: Chatham College; U. of Pennsylvania; Beaver College
- Coach: Mary Freeman Kelly

Susan Elizabeth Doerr (January 13, 1945 – February 18, 1972) was an American former competition swimmer, 1960 Olympic competitor, and a 1961 world record-holder in the 100-meter butterfly.

== Early swimming ==
Susan was born to Mr. and Mrs. Herbert E. Doerr Jr. in Bryn Mawr, Pennsylvania, on January 13, 1945.

She began her career in age group swimming in Philadelphia. She competed in her first United States Women's National Championships in the spring of 1959, representing Vesper Boat Club where she was managed by Hall of Fame Coach Mary Freeman Kelly. She went on to be a leading member of Vesper when they clinched their first high point award at the 1961 United States Women's National Championships; the same year, Doerr set a world record in the 100 m butterfly.

== 1960 Olympic 4x100-meter relay ==
She represented the United States as a 15-year-old at the 1960 Summer Olympics in Rome, where she swam the butterfly leg for the gold medal-winning U.S. team in the preliminary round of the 4×100-meter freestyle relay. She did not receive a medal at the time, because only relay swimmers who competed in the event final were eligible under the 1960 Olympic rules.

== 100-meter butterfly world record, 1961 ==
In one of the high points of her swimming career, in August 1961 she set an American and world record in the 100-meter butterfly with a time of 1:08.2.

She continued to compete as a swimmer after the Olympics, representing the Vesper Boat Club, at the National AAU Women's Outdoor Championships into August 1962, swimming a 1:09.4 in her signature event, the 100-meter butterfly but taking fourth in a highly competitive field, where the winner, Mary Stewart set a new world record. Susan's time was only 1.2 seconds off her 1961 World Record. She swam in another of her signature events at the Nationals, the 4x100 meter freestyle and set a new National record of 4:14.8.

Continuing to swim against a highly competitive field, she recorded a 1:09.5 for the 100-meter butterfly at the National AAU Senior Women's Swimming Championships in mid-August 1963, but took a fifth place in the event.

== Education ==
Doerr graduated from Abington Friends School in Abington, Pennsylvania, in 1963. She had issues with illness during her Senior year in High School, diagnosed as pleurisy, a lung inflammation, and a calcium difficiency and swam only sporadically that year. She had harbored hopes of qualifying for the 1964 Olympics, but 1963 had been a difficult year to maintain the rigorous training schedule required to meet that goal. She enrolled at Chatham College in Pittsburgh in 1963, and trained with the University of Pittsburgh Swimming team, but did not attend practices regularly and later enrolled at the University of Pennsylvania around 1965.

In Fall, 1967, she transferred from Penn to Beaver College, a women's school in Pennsylvania, now Arcadia College outside Philadelphia, where she graduated in February 1969. After graduation, she enrolled at the Montessori program at Philadelphia's Ravenhill Academy for Girls where she studied teaching. She returned to Abington Friends in 1969 as a student teacher. It was at the University of Pennsylvania where she met her husband John Brodsky, a graduate student in urban planning, whom she married in June 1970, and then moved to New York City.

Doerr died on February 18, 1972, in Manhattan in New York City. She had been suffering from depression.

Records
Preceded by Mary Stewart	Women's 100-meter butterfly world record-holder (long course); August 12, 1961 – July 28, 1962	Succeeded by Mary Stewart
