= Donna de Varona =

American swimmer, Olympic champion, sport commentator

Donna de Varona OLY
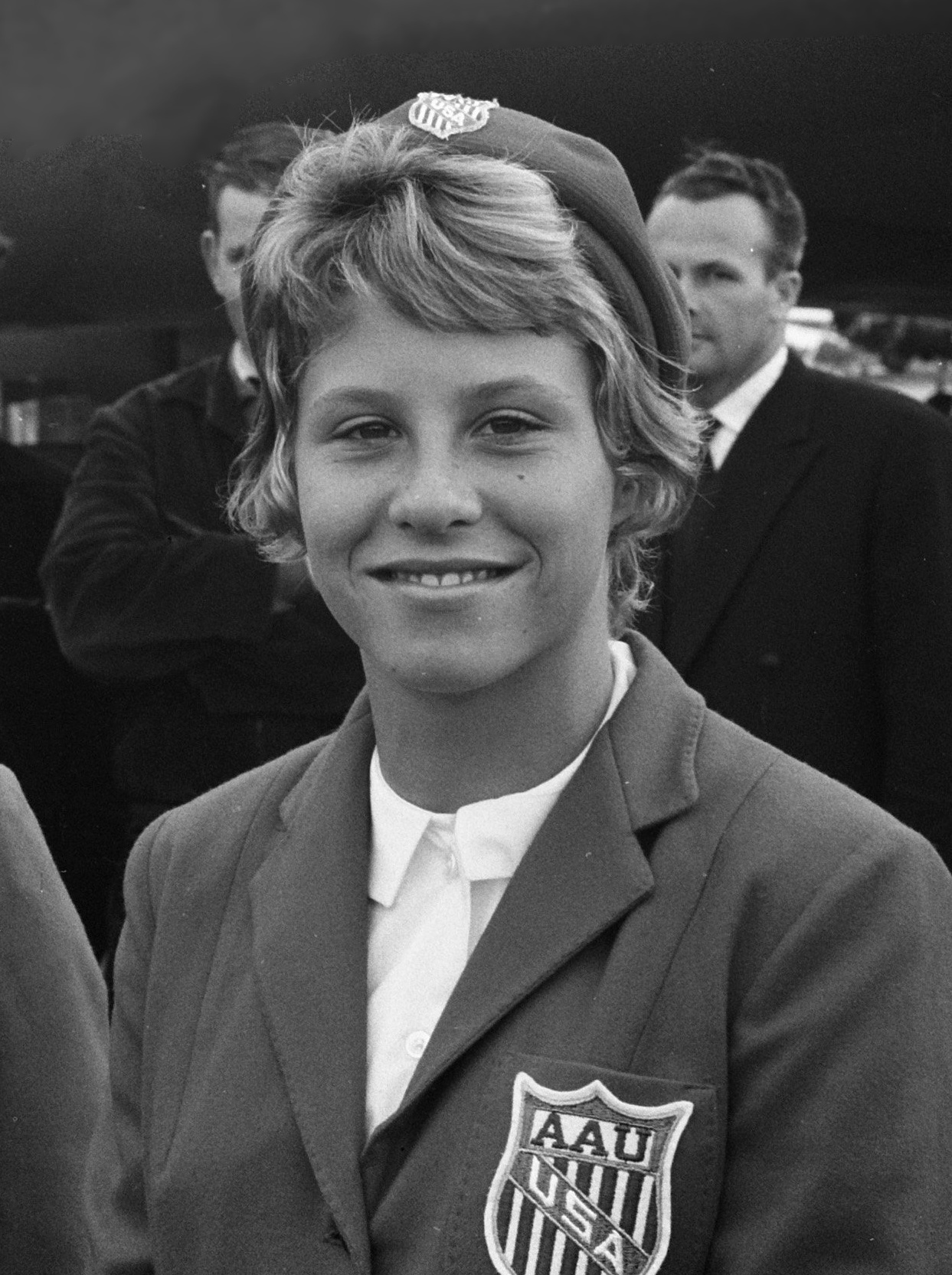
- de Varona in 1961

Personal information
- Full name: Donna Elizabeth de Varona
- Nickname: "Liz"
- National team: United States
- Born: April 26, 1947 (age 79) San Diego, California, U.S.
- Height: 5 ft 6 in (168 cm)
- Weight: 134 lb (61 kg)

Sport
- Sport: Swimming
- Strokes: Freestyle, individual medley
- Club: Santa Clara Swim Club
- Coach: George Haines (Santa Clara SC)
Medal record
Women's swimming
Representing the United States
Olympic Games
Gold medal – first place	1964 Tokyo	400 m medley
Gold medal – first place	1964 Tokyo	4×100 m freestyle
Pan American Games
Gold medal – first place	1963 São Paulo	4×100 m freestyle
Gold medal – first place	1963 São Paulo	4×100 m medley

Donna de Varona Pinto (née Donna Elizabeth de Varona; born April 26, 1947) is an American former swimmer, Olympic champion, activist, and television sportscaster.

== Biography ==
=== Swimming career ===
de Varona attended Santa Clara High School, whose swim team was coached for a period by George Haines. In 1960, de Varona qualified for the U.S. Olympic swimming team at age 13. She already held the world record in her signature event, the 400-meter individual medley, but the event would not be added to the Olympic schedule until the 1964 Olympics. At the 1960 Summer Olympics in Rome, De Varona swam for the U.S. team in the preliminary heats of the women's 4×100 freestyle relay, but she did not receive a gold medal because she did not swim in the event final. Four years later at the 1964 Summer Olympics in Tokyo, Japan, after she was well on her way to setting a career total of eighteen world best times and world records, she won the gold medal in the women's 400-meter individual medley. She defeated the second-place finisher by a margin of six seconds and set an Olympic record. She also earned a second gold medal as a member of the world-record-setting U.S. team in the 4×100-meter freestyle relay.

De Varona appeared on the covers of Sports Illustrated, Look and Life magazines. In 1964, the Associated Press and United Press International voted de Varona the "most outstanding woman athlete in the world." De Varona retired from swimming and began her career in the male-dominated world of sports broadcasting.

=== Professional life ===
At the age of 17, she appeared on ABC's Wide World of Sports, becoming the youngest and one of the first women sportscasters for a national network. Her groundbreaking career has earned her an Emmy, two Gracies and the opportunity to cover a wide variety of sports events including 17 winter and summer Olympic games. In 2006, she was inducted into the Museum of Television & Radio's first class of fifty "She Made It" pioneers in media.

While de Varona continued to pursue her television career, she also began her work in Washington, D.C. as an activist for sports and fitness opportunities for America's youth. Since her retirement from competitions in 1965, she has served five terms on the President's Council on Physical Fitness and Sports and has been appointed to Presidential Commissions under presidents Ford, Carter, Reagan, Clinton, and Bush. A consultant to the United States Senate, de Varona took a leave of absence from her pioneering television career to help with the passage of the 1978 Amateur Sports Act which restructured how Olympic sports are governed in the United States. Subsequently, she was called back to the Senate to consult on amendments to the landmark Olympic legislation and eventually worked to promote and safeguard Title IX of the Equal Education Amendments Act which prohibits discrimination on the basis of sex in any educational institution receiving Federal funding. Named a special advisor to President Clinton's Drug Czar, General Barry McCaffrey, de Varona helped with the establishment and funding for both the United States Anti-Doping Agency and the World Anti-Doping Agency, which are entrusted with eradicating the use of illegal substances to enhance performance in sports.

In 1993, de Varona was one of the two hosts at the 101st IOC Session in Monte Carlo.

A promoter of women in sport, in the mid-1970s, she joined Billie Jean King in establishing the Women's Sports Foundation. She served as the first president (1979–1984) and subsequently, became the chairman and honorary trustee for the foundation. Under de Varona's leadership, the Women's Sport Foundation initiated the Hall of Fame Dinner (now the Annual Salute to Women in Sports Awards Dinner), Travel and Training Grants, research projects, a toll-free telephone number and annual visits to Washington, D.C., to educate Congress about Title IX and the importance of providing sport and physical activity opportunities on an equitable basis to both men and women. Over the years, the foundation has raised more than $30 million to support its programs.

From 1997 to 1999, de Varona chaired the organizing committee for the 1999 FIFA Women's World Cup. Recognized as the most successful women's sporting event in history, de Varona, a U.S. Olympic Hall of Famer, is a recipient of the Olympic Order, the highest honor presented by the International Olympic Committee. In 1999, Sports Illustrated for Women ranked her on its list of the "100 Greatest Athletes." She has also been awarded five honorary doctorates and in 2003, the National Collegiate Athletic Association (NCAA) Honors Committee awarded her the Theodore Roosevelt Award.

In 2000, de Varona sued ABC Sports for $50 million, saying she was fired because of her sex and age. She filed the lawsuit after working at ABC for over 30 years. The suit was dropped in 2002 when ABC Sports rehired de Varona as an ABC & ESPN liaison for domestic and international sports, plus on-air work for certain events. She said "Filing was the hardest thing I'd ever done. I'd been associated with ABC since I was 14, when I was swimming, and I grew from commentator to producer to adviser to Roone Arledge", the first president of ABC Sports.

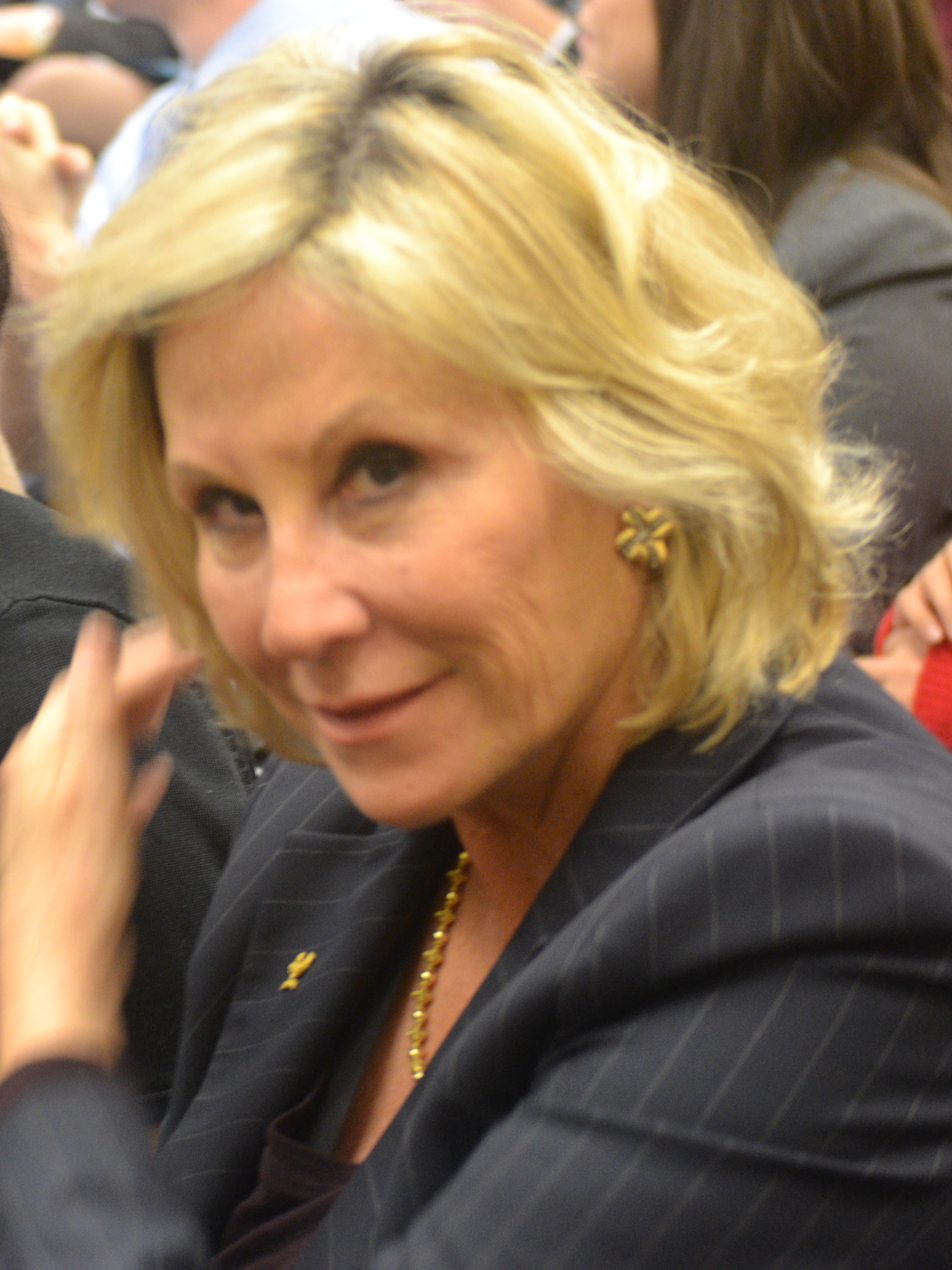
de Varona in 2012

In the fall of 2007, de Varona completed a documentary as a host, writer, and producer. This was done in observation of the 35th anniversary of Title IX, which was the legislation that outlawed discrimination in school programs, including sports. The CSTV documentary, which won a Cine Golden Eagle Award, focused on the impact of Title IX and how one recipient of a sports scholarship in America has been influential in changing attitudes and customs in the Middle East as well as within the International Olympic Committee. The program featured Morocco's minister of sports, Nawal El Moutawakel, who in 1984 became the first Muslim and African woman to win an Olympic gold medal, and in 2012 was elected vice president of the International Olympic Committee.

She was inducted to the International Swimming Hall of Fame as an "Honor Swimmer" in 1969. In 2003, de Varona was inducted into the National Women's Hall of Fame in Seneca Falls, New York. She also serves on the distinguished Citizens' Stamp Advisory Committee (CSAC), which recommends subjects who appear on U.S. postage stamps. She is a 1986 graduate of UCLA and the mother of two children: Joanna Pinto and John David Pinto.

De Varona serves on the executive board of Special Olympics International and is a member of the International Olympic Committee's Women and Sports Commission. She is also a board member of the International Swimming Hall of Fame and serves as an adviser to Jordan's Prince Feisal's Generations for Peace Foundation and Tony Blair's Beyond Sport Initiative. Most recently, de Varona was appointed to the United States Department of State's Empowerment of Girls and Women through Sports Council by Secretary of State Hillary Clinton. She is also President of DAMAR Productions, a marketing, consulting and events advisory company. She was also the chair of the Athlete Advisory Committee for the 2019 Aurora Games.

== Activism ==
In 2020, de Varona, along with 300+ women athletes and activists, signed a letter to the National Collegiate Athletic Association in support of an Idaho law that bans transgender women and girls who are student athletes from competing in women's and girls' sports. Citing the importance of the letter to safeguard the integrity of women's sports, De Varona remarked, "I agree with the letter. Those that want to compete as transgender male to female athletes should be accommodated in a separate or more creative manner."

In 2021, de Varona joined the Women's Sports Policy Working Group, formed in opposition to President Joe Biden's Executive Order 13988 that mandates blanket inclusion for all transgender women athletes. To achieve this end, the Order's stated goal is "protecting the girls’ and women's competitive categories, while crafting accommodations for trans athletes into sport wherever possible."

== Personal life ==
In 1986, de Varona graduated from the University of California, Los Angeles (UCLA). Her younger sister is actress-director Joanna Kerns. She and her husband, John Pinto, have two children, John David and Joanna.

== See also ==
- List of Olympic medalists in swimming (women)
- List of University of California, Los Angeles people
- World record progression 200 metres individual medley
- World record progression 400 metres individual medley
- World record progression 4 × 100 metres medley relay

Records
Preceded by Sylvia Ruuska; Sharon Finneran; Sharon Finneran	Women's 400-meter individual medley world record-holder (long course); July 15, 1960 – July 26, 1962; July 26, 1962 – July 28, 1962; March 10, 1964 – July 9, 1967	Succeeded by Sharon Finneran; Sharon Finneran; Claudia Kolb
Preceded by Sylvia Ruuska	Women's 200-meter individual medley world record-holder (long course); May 13, 1961 – July 22, 1966	Succeeded by Lynn Vidali
Awards
Preceded by Eunice Kennedy Shriver	Theodore Roosevelt Award (NCAA); 2003	Succeeded by Alan Page
Preceded by Mary Lou Retton	Flo Hyman Memorial Award; 1996	Succeeded by Billie Jean King
