= Nancy Ramey =

American swimmer (1940–2022)

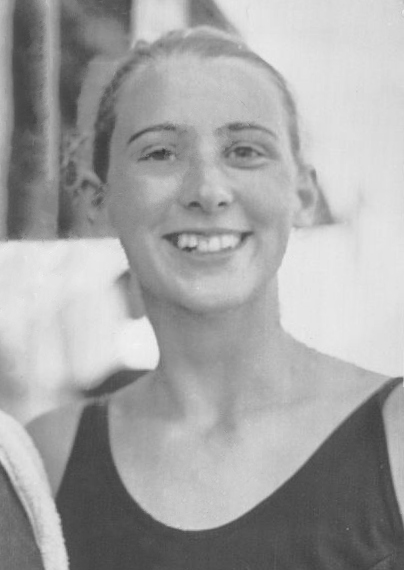
- Ramey in 1959

Personal information
- Full name: Nancy Jane Ramey
- National team: United States
- Born: June 29, 1940 Seattle, Washington, U.S.
- Died: March 30, 2022 (aged 81) Valdez, Alaska, U.S.
- Height: 5 ft 2 1/2 in (159 cm)
- Weight: 112 lb (51 kg)

Sport
- Sport: Swimming
- Strokes: Butterfly
- Club: Washington Athletic Club
- Coach: Ray Daughters (WAC)
Medal record
Representing the United States
Olympic Games
Silver medal – second place	1956 Melbourne	100 m butterfly
Pan American Games
Silver medal – second place	1959 Chicago	100 m butterfly

Nancy Jane Ramey (June 29, 1940 – March 30, 2022), later known by her married name Nancy Lethcoe, was an American competition swimmer, 1956 Olympic medalist, and former world record-holder in two events.

== Biography ==
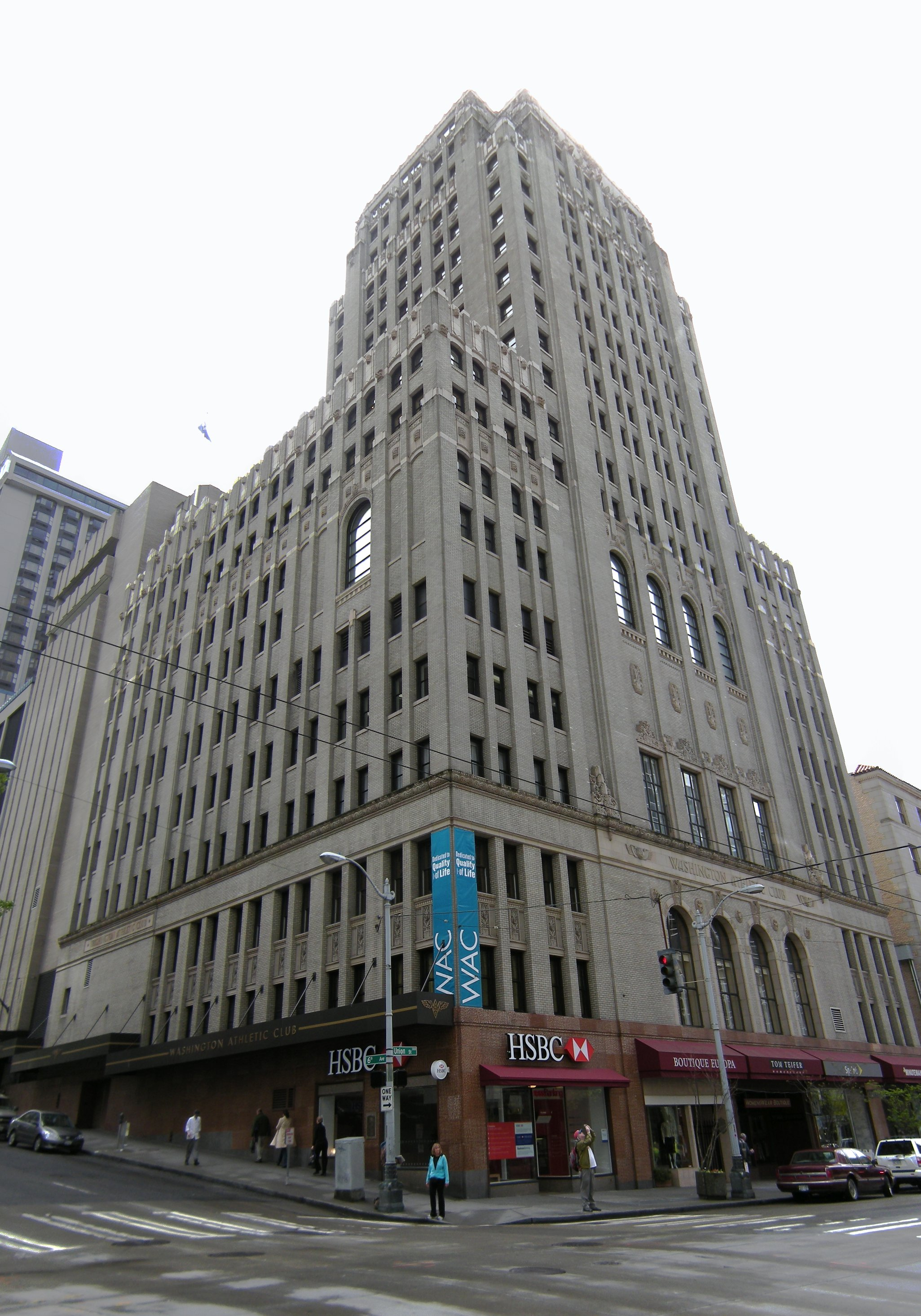
Washington Athletic Club

Ramey was born in Seattle and grew up on Mercer Island, Washington. At time of the 1956 Olympics, she was a student at Mercer Island High School. Ramey swam for the Washington Athletic Club in Seattle, Washington, where she was trained by Hall of Fame Coach Ray Daughters who, like Ramey, excelled in butterfly as a young swimming competitor. Daughters started coaching swimming at the WAC in 1930, became Director of Athletics in 1942 and retired in December 1964. Daughters had previously coached 1936 Olympic triple gold medalists Helene Madison, and Jack Medica at WAC. In the 1936 Berlin, and the 1948 London Olympics, Daughters was Head Coach of the U.S. Women's Team.

=== 1956 Olympic silver medal ===
As a 16-year-old, Ramey represented the United States at the 1956 Summer Olympics in Melbourne, Australia, where she won a silver medal in the 100 meter butterfly event.

In 1958 she set two world records in the 100 m and one in the 200 m butterfly; the same year she won five American and one Canadian national title. In 1959 she won a silver medal in the 100 m butterfly at the Pan American Games. After the Olympics, Ramey set two new world records in the 100- and 200-meter butterfly in 1958 and 1959.

== Life after swimming ==
She graduated from the University of Washington in 1962, after spending her junior year at the University of London's Bedford College. She graduated from the University of Wisconsin–Madison with a master's degree in 1967, and subsequently earned her doctorate. In the 1970s she worked as an assistant professor of religious studies at Stanford University. After earning her doctorate, she served as both an environmental activist and political candidate.

She married Jim Lethcoe in 1962. She and her husband founded Prince William Sound Books which largely includes books about Prince William Sound, Valdez Gold Rush Trails of 1898-99, History of Prince William Sound, Cruising Guides to Prince William Sound, and Habitats of Change. She and Jim Lethcoe organized Alaskan wilderness safaris. She served as a teacher and political activist living in Valdez, Alaska. Ramey-Lethcoe campaigned for the Alaska State House District 12 in the November 2008 elections, but failed to win the seat from incumbent John Harris.

Lethcoe taught philosophy part-time at Alaska Methodist University and the Anchorage Community College before teaching full-time at Stanford University. From 1974 to 2004, the Lethcoes owned and operated Alaska Wilderness Sailing and Kayaking, offering guided trips in Prince William Sound.

In 1980, Nancy Ramey-Lethcoe and her husband Jim moved to Valdez, Alaska to teach part-time at Prince William Sound Community College. In 1984 the couple started Prince William Sound Books. They researched, wrote, and published the books Cruising Guide to Prince William Sound, Glaciers of Prince William Sound, Geology of Prince William Sound, Prince William Sound's Weather and Climate, the Valdez Gold Rush Trails, and a History of Prince William Sound. The Lethcoes also published books by other authors on topics related to the region. Lethcoe became an expert on the local and natural history of Valdez and Prince William Sound and is featured expert in the Valdez Museum's DVD, Between the Glacier and the Sea.

In the early 1980s Lethcoe worked on the land management planning process for the Chugach National Forest. Her activities resulted in the halting of clear-cutting in Prince William Sound. She also spoke out against a proposed road to Whittier.

After the 1989 Exxon Valdez oil spill, the National Oceanic and Atmospheric Administration invited Lethcoe to represent the public on its shoreline clean-up committee that advised the U.S. Coast Guard and Exxon.

In 1989, she received the Celia Hunter award for work on tracking legislative bills related to the oil spill. The Alaska Legislature honored both Jim and Nancy Lethcoe for "their years of dedication and work on behalf of Alaska . . . [their] volunteer work during the Prince William Sound Oil Spill when they sought to work with all parties through mediation and diplomacy instead of divisiveness and antagonism."

Lethcoe helped to found the Alaska Wilderness Recreation and Tourism Association and became its first President.

She survived both her husband and her daughters. Nancy Lethcoe later lived in Valdez, Alaska, on her sailboat, the Arctic Tern III. She was one of three former Olympians from Alaska to be honored by the U.S. Olympic committee on their "Road to Beijing" website.

Ramey Lethcoe died on 30 March 2022, at the age of 81.

== See also ==
- List of Olympic medalists in swimming (women)
- List of University of Washington people
- World record progression 100 metres butterfly
- World record progression 200 metres butterfly

Records
Preceded by Atie Voorbij	Women's 100-meter butterfly world record-holder (long course); June 28, 1958 – April 2, 1961	Succeeded by Janice Andrew
Preceded by None	Women's 200-meter butterfly world record-holder (long course); June 29, 1958 – September 13, 1958	Succeeded by Tineke Lagerberg
