= Becky Collins =

American swimmer (born 1944)

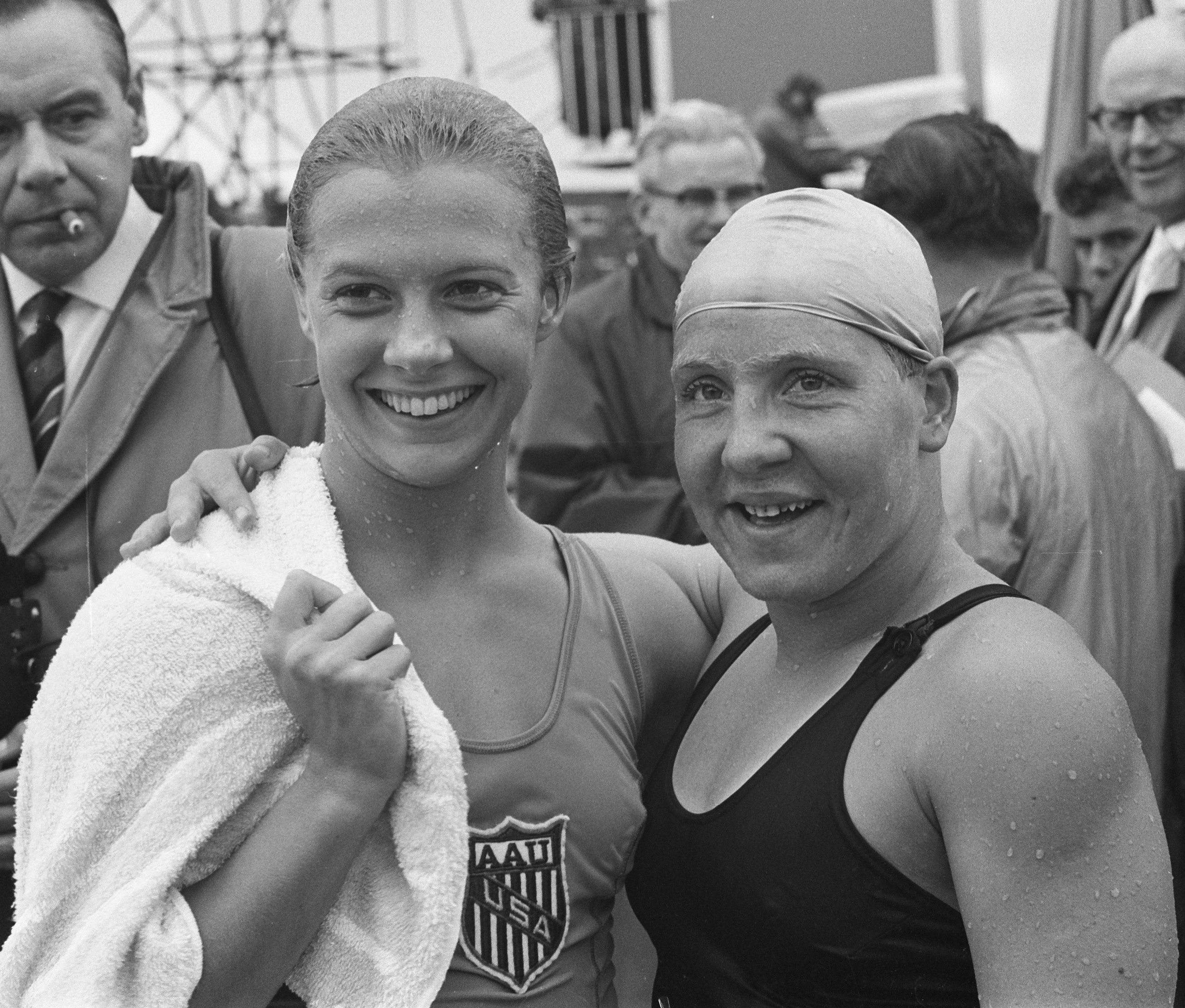
- Collins (left) and Tineke Lagerberg in 1961

Personal information
- Born: 1943 (age 82–83)

Sport
- Sport: Swimming
- Strokes: Butterfly, medley
Medal record
Representing United States
Pan American Games
Gold medal – first place	1959 Chicago	4×100 m medley
Gold medal – first place	1959 Chicago	100 m butterfly

Rebecca Collins (born November 21, 1943 - died August 25, 2026) was a retired American swimmer. On July 20, 1958, she set a new world record in the individual 200 m medley. One year later, on July 19, 1959, she broke the world record of Tineke Lagerberg in the 200 m butterfly. She lost that record to Marianne Heemskerk in 1960, but took it back in 1961. She was also part of the US relay team that set a new world record in the 4×100 m medley at the 1959 Pan American Games. She won another gold medal at those games, in the 100 m butterfly. Between 1959 and 1961 she won seven national titles in individual butterfly and medley events.

After marriage she changed her last name to Furste.

== See also ==
- World record progression 200 metres butterfly
- World record progression 200 metres individual medley
