= Anneliese Rockenbach =

Venezuelan swimmer

Personal information
- Born: 3 March 1943 (age 83) Marienbad, Nazi Germany (now Mariánské Lázně, Czech Republic)

Sport
- Sport: Swimming

Anneliese Rockenbach (born 3 March 1943) is a Venezuelan swimmer. She competed at the 1960 Summer Olympics and the 1964 Summer Olympics.
