= Silvia Belmar =

Mexican swimmer (born 1945)

Personal information
- Born: 2 August 1945 (age 81) Mexico City, Mexico

Sport
- Sport: Swimming
Medal record
Representing Mexico
Central American and Caribbean Games
Gold medal – first place	1962 Kingston	100m butterfly
Gold medal – first place	1962 Kingston	400m individual medley
Gold medal – first place	1962 Kingston	4x100m freestyle relay

Silvia Belmar (born 2 August 1945) is a Mexican former swimmer. She competed at the 1960 Summer Olympics and the 1964 Summer Olympics.
