= Eileen Weir =

Canadian swimmer

Personal information
- Born: 29 January 1946 (age 80)

Sport
- Sport: Swimming
Medal record
Representing Canada
Pan American Games
Silver medal – second place	1963 Sao Paulo	4x100m freestyle relay
Bronze medal – third place	1963 Sao Paulo	100m backstroke

Eileen Weir (born 29 January 1946) is a Canadian former backstroke swimmer. She competed in two events at the 1964 Summer Olympics.
