= 4 × 100 metres medley relay =

The 4 × 100 metres medley relay is an event in competitive swimming.

Each of four swimmers on a team swims a 100 m leg of the relay, each swimming a different stroke, in the following sequence:

1. Backstroke (this can only be the first stroke, due to the necessity of starting this leg in the pool rather than by diving in)
2. Breaststroke
3. Butterfly
4. Freestyle (in medley swimming, it must be any stroke not previously swum – most swimmers use the front crawl).

World records are ratified by World Aquatics (formerly FINA). The long course world records (men, women and mixed) are currently held by the US. The current short course world record holders are Neutral Athletes B (men) and the US (women).

The men's and women's events have been contested at the Olympic Games since 1960, while the mixed event has been contested since the 2020 games; the current Olympic champions are China (men) and the US (women and mixed). The men's and women's events have been contested at the World Aquatics Championships since the inaugural championships in 1973, while the mixed event was introduced in 2015; the current world champions (long course) are Neutral Athletes B (men and mixed) and the US (women). The men's and women's events have been contested at the World Aquatics Swimming Championships (25m) since the inaugural championships in 1993, while the mixed event was introduced in 2024; the current world champions (short course) are Neutral Athletes B (men and mixed) and the US (women).

== World record progression ==
=== Men long course ===
#	Time		Name	Nationality	Date	Meet	Location	Ref
1	4:39.2		Gustaf Hellsing; Lennart Brock; Roy Dahl; Hakan Westesson	Sweden	22 Feb 1953	-	Helsingborg, Sweden	
2	4:32.2		Gilbert Bozon; Pierre Dumesnil; Maurice Lusien; Alex Jany	France	22 Mar 1953	-	Charleroi, Belgium	
3	4:31.5		A. Violas; Pierre Dumesnil; Julian Arene; Aldo Eminente	France	1 Apr 1953	-	Troyes, France	
4	4:30.8		Gustaf Hellsing; Lennart Brock; Göran Larsson; Per-Olof Östrand	Sweden	17 Apr 1953	-	Lund, Sweden	
5	4:27.8		Gustaf Hellsing; Lennart Brock; Göran Larsson; Per-Olof Östrand	Sweden	24 Apr 1953	-	Borås, Sweden	
6	4:24.8		Viktor Lopatin; Vladimir Minashkin; Pyotr Skripchenkov; Lev Balandin	Soviet Union	13 May 1953	-	Moscow, Soviet Union	
7	4:21.3		Viktor Solovyov; Vladimir Minashkin; Pyotr Skripchenkov; Lev Balandin	Soviet Union	26 Jan 1954	-	Moscow, Soviet Union	
8	4:19.0		Viktor Solovyov; Vladimir Minashkin; Pyotr Skripchenkov; Lev Balandin	Soviet Union	24 Feb 1954	-	Stockholm, Sweden	
9	4:14.8		G. Kuvaldin; Vladimir Minashkin; Vladimir Strushanov; Lev Balandin	Soviet Union	14 Aug 1956	Olympic Trials	Moscow, Soviet Union	
10	4:17.8		Kazuo Tomita (1:01.2); Masaru Furukawa (-); Takashi Ishimoto (-); Katsuki Ishihara (-)	Japan	7 Sep 1957	All-Japan Student Championships	Tokyo, Japan	
11	4:17.2		Keiji Hase (1:05.5); Masaru Furukawa (1:13.4); Takashi Ishimoto (1:00.4); Manabu Koga (57.9)	Japan	28 May 1958	Asian Games	Tokyo, Japan	
12	4:16.7		Keiji Hase (1:05.4); Masaru Furukawa (1:13.4); Takashi Ishimoto (59.6); Manabu Koga (58.3)	Japan	29 Jun 1958	-	Los Angeles, United States	
13	4:14.2	yd	John Monckton; Terry Gathercole; Brian Wilkinson; John Devitt	Australia	25 Jul 1958	British Empire and Commonwealth Games	Cardiff, United Kingdom	
14	4:10.4		John Monckton; Terry Gathercole; Brian Wilkinson; John Devitt	Australia	22 Aug 1958	-	Osaka, Japan	
15	4:09.2		Frank McKinney; Chet Jastremski; Mike Troy; Peter Sintz	United States	24 Jul 1960	-	Toledo, Ohio, United States	
16	4:08.2	h	Bob Bennett; Paul Hait; Dave Gillanders; Steve Clark	United States	27 Aug 1960	Olympic Games	Rome, Italy	
17	4:05.4		Frank McKinney (1:02.0); Paul Hait (1:10.5); Lance Larson (58.0); Jeff Farrell (54.9)	United States	1 Sep 1960	Olympic Games	Rome, Italy	
18	4:03.0		Tom Stock; Chet Jastremski; Lary Schulhof; Peter Sintz	United States	20 Aug 1961	-	Los Angeles, United States	
19	4:01.6		Tom Stock; Chet Jastremski; Fred Schmidt; Peter Sintz	United States	12 Aug 1962	-	Cuyahoga Falls, United States	
20	4:00.1		Richard McGeagh; Bill Craig; Walter Richardson; Steve Clark	United States	24 Aug 1963	-	Osaka, Japan	
21	3:58.4		Thompson Mann (59.6 WR); Bill Craig (1:09.6); Fred Schmidt (56.8); Steve Clark (52.4)	United States	16 Oct 1964	Olympic Games	Tokyo, Japan	
22	3:57.2		Charlie Hickcox (59.1 WR); Ken Merten; Doug Russell; Ken Walsh	United States	31 Aug 1967	Universiade	Tokyo, Japan	
23	3:56.5		Roland Matthes; Egon Henninger; Horst-Gunther Gregor; Frank Wiegand	East Germany	7 Nov 1967	-	Leipzig, East Germany	
24	3:54.9		Charlie Hickcox; Don McKenzie; Doug Russell; Ken Walsh	United States	26 Oct 1968	Olympic Games	Mexico City, Mexico	
25	3:54.4		Roland Matthes; Klaus Katzur; Udo Poser; Lutz Unger	East Germany	8 Sep 1970	European Championships	Barcelona, Spain	
26	3:50.4		Charles Campbell; Peter Dahlberg; Mark Spitz; Jerry Heidenreich	United States	3 Sep 1971	GDRvUSA Duel	Leipzig, East Germany	
27	3:48.16		Mike Stamm (57.97); Tom Bruce (1:04.22); Mark Spitz (54.28); Jerry Heidenreich (51.69)	United States	4 Sep 1972	Olympic Games	Munich, West Germany	
28	3:47.28		Peter Rocca (57.94); Chris Woo (1:04.46); Joe Bottom (54.30); Jack Babashoff (50.58)	United States	22 Jul 1976	Olympic Games	Montreal, Canada	
29	3:42.22		John Naber (55.89); John Hencken (1:02.50); Matt Vogel (54.26); Jim Montgomery (49.57)	United States	22 Jul 1976	Olympic Games	Montreal, Canada	
30	3:40.84		Rick Carey; Steve Lundquist; Matt Gribble; Rowdy Gaines	United States	7 Aug 1982	World Championships	Guayaquil, Ecuador	
31	3:40.42		Rick Carey; Steve Lundquist; Matt Gribble; Rowdy Gaines	United States	22 Aug 1983	Pan American Games	Caracas, Venezuela	
32	3:39.30		Rick Carey (55.41); Steve Lundquist (1:01.86); Pablo Morales (52.87); Rowdy Gaines (49.16)	United States	4 Aug 1984	Olympic Games	Los Angeles, United States	
33	3:38.28		Rick Carey (56.32); John Moffet (1:01.37); Pablo Morales (52.75); Matt Biondi (47.84)	United States	18 Aug 1985	Pan Pacific Championships	Tokyo, Japan	
34	3:36.93		David Berkoff (54.56); Rick Schroeder (1:01.64); Matt Biondi (52.38); Chris Jacobs (48.35)	United States	25 Sep 1988	Olympic Games	Seoul, South Korea	
34=	3:36.93		Jeff Rouse (53.86 WR); Nelson Diebel (1:01.45); Pablo Morales (52.83); Jon Olsen (48.79)	United States	31 Jul 1992	Olympic Games	Barcelona, Spain	
35	3:34.84		Jeff Rouse (53.95); Jeremy Linn (1:00.32); Mark Henderson (52.39); Gary Hall, Jr. (48.18)	United States	26 Jul 1996	Olympic Games	Atlanta, United States	
36	3:33.73		Lenny Krayzelburg (53.87); Ed Moses (59.84); Ian Crocker (52.10); Gary Hall, Jr. (47.92)	United States	23 Sep 2000	Olympic Games	Sydney, Australia	
37	3:33.48		Aaron Peirsol (54.17); Brendan Hansen (1:00.14); Michael Phelps (51.13); Jason Lezak (48.04)	United States	29 Aug 2002	Pan Pacific Championships	Yokohama, Japan	
38	3:31.54		Aaron Peirsol (53.71); Brendan Hansen (59.61); Ian Crocker (50.39); Jason Lezak (47.83)	United States	27 Jul 2003	World Championships	Barcelona, Spain	
39	3:30.68		Aaron Peirsol (53.45 WR); Brendan Hansen (59.37); Ian Crocker (50.28); Jason Lezak (47.58)	United States	21 Aug 2004	Olympic Games	Athens, Greece	
40	3:29.34		Aaron Peirsol (53.16); Brendan Hansen (59.27); Michael Phelps (50.15); Jason Lezak (46.76)	United States	17 Aug 2008	Olympic Games	Beijing, China	
41	3:27.28		Aaron Peirsol (52.19); Eric Shanteau (58.57); Michael Phelps (49.72); David Walters (46.80)	United States	2 Aug 2009	World Championships	Rome, Italy	
42	3:26.78		Ryan Murphy (52.31); Michael Andrew (58.49); Caeleb Dressel (49.03); Zach Apple (46.95)	United States	1 Aug 2021	Olympic Games	Tokyo, Japan	

Legend: # – Record awaiting ratification by FINA; yd – set in a pool measured in yards; e – equalled existing record;
Records not set in finals: h – heat; sf – semifinal; r – relay 1st leg; rh – relay heat 1st leg; b – B final; † – en route to final mark; so – swim-off; tt – time trial

=== Men short course ===
#	Time		Name	Nationality	Date	Meet	Location	Ref
1	3:34.86		Mark Tewksbury (52.50 WBT); John Cleveland (-); Tom Ponting (-); Stephen Vandermeulen (-)	Canada	22 Feb 1992	CAN SC Nationals	Winnipeg, Canada	
2	3:32.57		Tripp Schwenk (53.24); Seth Van Neerden (59.43); Mark Henderson (52.20); Jon Olsen (47.70)	United States	2 Dec 1993	World SC Championships	Palma de Mallorca, Spain	
3	3:30.91		Adrian Radley (52.28); Ryan Mitchell (59.68); Geoff Huegill (51.10); Michael Klim (47.85)	Australia	23 Dec 1996	AUS SC Nationals	Melbourne, Australia	
4	3:30.66		Adrian Radley (52.72); Phil Rogers (59.39); Geoff Huegill (51.35); Michael Klim (47.20)	Australia	17 Apr 1997	World SC Championships	Gothenburg, Sweden	
5	3:29.88		Matt Welsh (53.34); Phil Rogers (59.47); Michael Klim (50.69); Chris Fydler (46.38)	Australia	4 Apr 1999	World SC Championships	Hong Kong, Hong Kong	
6	3:29.00		Aaron Peirsol (52.17); David Denniston (58.56); Peter Marshall (51.93); Jason Lezak (46.34)	United States	7 Apr 2002	World SC Championships	Moscow, Russia	
7	3:28.12	tt	Matt Welsh (50.95); Jim Piper (59.44); Geoff Huegill (50.61); Ashley Callus (47.12)	Australia	4 Sep 2002	AUS SC Nationals	Melbourne, Australia	
8	3:25.38		Aaron Peirsol (51.28); Brendan Hansen (57.82); Ian Crocker (48.62); Garrett Weber-Gale (47.66)	United States	25 Mar 2004	NCAA Championships	East Meadow, United States	
9	3:25.09		Aaron Peirsol (51.35); Brendan Hansen (57.42); Ian Crocker (49.76); Jason Lezak (46.56)	United States	11 Oct 2004	World SC Championships	Indianapolis, United States	
10	3:24.29		Stanislav Donets (50.57); Sergey Geybel (57.93); Yevgeny Korotyshkin (49.39); Alexander Sukhorukov (46.40)	Russia	13 Apr 2008	World SC Championships	Manchester, United Kingdom	
11	3:23.33		Jake Tapp (50.60); Paul Kornfeld (57.18); Joe Bartoch (50.18); Brent Hayden (45.37)	Canada	9 Aug 2009	British Gas SC Grand Prix	Leeds, United Kingdom	
12	3:20.71		Nick Thoman (48.94 WR); Mark Gangloff (57.03); Michael Phelps (49.93); Nathan Adrian (44.81)	United States	18 Dec 2009	Duel in the Pool	Manchester, United Kingdom	
13	3:19.16		Stanislav Donets (49.63); Sergey Geybel (56.43); Yevgeny Korotyshkin (48.35); Danila Izotov (44.75)	Russia	20 Dec 2009	Vladimir Salnikov Swimming Cup	Saint Petersburg, Russia	
14	3:18.98	=	Isaac Cooper (49.46); Joshua Yong (56.55); Matthew Temple (48.34); Kyle Chalmers (44.63)	Australia	18 Dec 2022	World Championships	Melbourne, Australia	
14	3:18.98	=	Ryan Murphy (48.96); Nic Fink (54.88); Trenton Julian (49.19); Kieran Smith (45.95)	United States	18 Dec 2022	World Championships	Melbourne, Australia	
15	3:18.68		Miron Lifintsev (49.31); Kirill Prigoda (55.15); Andrei Minakov (48.80); Egor Kornev (45.42)	Russia	15 December 2024	World Championships	Budapest, Hungary	

Legend: # – Record awaiting ratification by FINA; e – equalled existing record;
Records not set in finals: h – heat; sf – semifinal; r – relay 1st leg; rh – relay heat 1st leg; b – B final; † – en route to final mark; so – swim-off; tt – time trial

=== Women long course ===
#	Time		Name	Nationality	Date	Meet	Location	Ref
1	5:10.8		Magda Hunyadfi; Klara Killermann; Éva Székely; Valéria Gyenge	Hungary	24 Jul 1953	-	Budapest, Hungary	
2	5:09.2		Magda Hunyadfi; Klara Killermann; Éva Székely; Valéria Gyenge	Hungary	10 Aug 1953	-	Bucharest, Romania	
3	5:07.8		Judit Temes; Klara Killermann; Mária Littomericzky; Katalin Szőke	Hungary	3 Aug 1954	-	Budapest, Hungary	
4	5:06.2		Marie-Helene Andre; Francoise Derommeleere; Odette Lusien; Josette Arene	France	16 Aug 1954	-	Marseille, France	
5	5:02.1		Joke de Korte (1:13.0); Rika Bruins (1:23.4); Mary Kok (1:20.3); Geertje Wielema (1:05.4)	Netherlands	27 Nov 1954	-	Rotterdam, Netherlands	
6	5:00.1		Jopie van Alphen; Rika Bruins; Atie Voorbij; Hetty Balkenende	Netherlands	17 Jul 1955	-	Paris, France	
7	4:57.8		Eva Pajor; Éva Székely; Rypsyma Székely; Katalin Szőke	Hungary	3 Sep 1955	-	Budapest, Hungary	
8	4:54.3		Lenie de Nijs; Rita Kroon; Atie Voorbij; Greetje Kraan	Netherlands	19 Nov 1956	-	Hilversum, Netherlands	
9	4:53.1		Joke de Korte; Ada den Haan; Tineke Lagerberg; Cocky Gastelaars	Netherlands	8 Dec 1956	-	Zwolle, Netherlands	
10	4:57.0	yd	Greetje Kraan; Ada den Haan; Atie Voorbij; Cocky Gastelaars	Netherlands	18 May 1957	GBRvNED International	Blackpool, United Kingdom	
11	4:54.0	yd	Judy Grinham (1:10.9); Anita Lonsbrough (1:23.3); Christine Gosden (1:14.2); Diana Wilkinson (1:04.6)	Great Britain	25 July 1958	British Empire and Commonwealth Games	Cardiff, United Kingdom	
12	4:52.9		Lenie de Nijs; Ada den Haan; Atie Voorbij; Cocky Gastelaars	Netherlands	5 Sep 1958	European Championships	Budapest, Hungary	
13	4:51.5		Ria van Velsen (1:11.7); Ada den Haan; Tineke Lagerberg; Cocky Gastelaars	Netherlands	26 Jul 1959	NEDvGBR International Meet	Waalwijk, Netherlands	
14	4:44.6		Carin Cone; Ann Bancroft; Becky Collins; Chris von Saltza	United States	6 Sep 1959	1959 Pan American Games	Chicago, United States	
15	4:41.1		Lynn Burke; Patty Kempner; Carolyn Schuler; Chris von Saltza	United States	2 Sep 1960	Olympic Games	Rome, Italy	
16	4:40.1		Ingrid Schmidt; Heidi Pechstein; Ute Noack; Barbara Gobel	East Germany	23 Aug 1962	European Championships	Leipzig, East Germany	
17	4:39.1		Maria van Velsen (1:12.2); Klenie Bimolt (1:18.0); Ada Kok (1:05.4); Erica Terpstra (1:03.5)	Netherlands	28 Jun 1964	NEDvGBR International Meet	Groningen (city), Netherlands	
18	4:38.1		Donna de Varona; Claudia Kolb; Judy Haroun; Lillian Watson	United States	4 Jul 1964	-	Los Altos, California, United States	
19	4:34.6		Cathy Ferguson; Cynthia Goyette; Martha Randall; Kathy Ellis	United States	28 Sep 1964	Pre Olympic	Los Angeles, United States	
20	4:33.9		Cathy Ferguson; Cynthia Goyette; Sharon Stouder; Kathy Ellis	United States	18 Oct 1964	Olympic Games	Tokyo, Japan	
21	4:30.0		Kendis Moore; Catie Ball; Ellie Daniel; Wendy Fordyce	United States	30 Jul 1967	Pan American Games	Winnipeg, Canada	
22	4:28.1		Kaye Hall; Catie Ball; Ellie Daniel; Susan Pedersen	United States	14 Sep 1968	Pre Olympic	Colorado Springs, United States	
23	4:27.4		Susie Atwood; Kim Brecht; Alice Jones; Cindy Schilling	United States	1 Sep 1970	-	Tokyo, Japan	
24	4:27.3		Susie Atwood; Claudia Clevenger; Ellie Daniel; Linda Johnson	United States	11 Sep 1971	URSvUSAvGBR meet	Minsk, Soviet Union	
25	4:25.34		Susie Atwood; Lynn Vidali; Ellie Daniel; Jane Barkman	United States	18 Aug 1972	Pre Olympic	Knoxville, United States	
26	4:20.75		Melissa Belote; Cathy Carr; Deena Deardurff; Sandy Neilson	United States	3 Sep 1972	Olympic Games	Munich, West Germany	
27	4:16.84		Ulrike Richter; Renate Vogel; Rosemarie Kother; Kornelia Ender	East Germany	4 Sep 1973	World Championships	Belgrade, Yugoslavia	
28	4:13.78		Ulrike Richter; Renate Vogel; Rosemarie Kother; Kornelia Ender	East Germany	24 Aug 1974	European Championships	Vienna, Austria	
29	4:13.41		Monika Seltmann; Carola Nitschke; Andrea Pollack; Barbara Krause	East Germany	5 Jun 1976	East German National Championships	Berlin, East Germany	
30	4:07.95		Ulrike Richter (1:02.23); Hannelore Anke (1:10.15); Andrea Pollack (59.53); Kornelia Ender (56.04)	East Germany	18 Jul 1976	Olympic Games	Montreal, Canada	
31	4:06.67		Rica Reinisch (1:01.51 =WR); Ute Geweniger (1:09.46); Andrea Pollack (1:00.14); Caren Metschuck (55.56)	East Germany	20 Jul 1980	Olympic Games	Moscow, Soviet Union	
32	4:05.88		Kristin Otto; Ute Geweniger; Ines Geißler; Birgit Meineke	East Germany	6 Aug 1982	World Championships	Guayaquil, Ecuador	
33	4:05.79		Ina Kleber; Ute Geweniger; Ines Geißler; Birgit Meineke	East Germany	26 Aug 1983	European Championships	Rome, Italy	
34	4:03.69		Ina Kleber (1:00.59 WR); Sylvia Gerasch (1:08.69); Ines Geißler (59.52); Birgit Meineke (54.89)	East Germany	24 Aug 1984	Friendship Games	Moscow, Soviet Union	
35	4:02.54		Lea Loveless (1:00.82); Anita Nall (1:08.67); Crissy Ahmann-Leighton (58.58); Jenny Thompson (54.47)	United States	30 Jul 1992	Olympic Games	Barcelona, Spain	
36	4:01.67		He Cihong (1:00.16 WR); Dai Guohong (1:09.04); Liu Limin (58.66); Le Jingyi (53.81)	China	10 Sep 1994	World Championships	Rome, Italy	
37	3:58.30		Barbara Bedford (1:01.39); Megan Quann (1:06.29); Jenny Thompson (57.25); Dara Torres (53.37)	United States	23 Sep 2000	Olympic Games	Sydney, Australia	
38	3:57.32		Giaan Rooney (1:01.18); Leisel Jones (1:06.50); Petria Thomas (56.67); Jodie Henry (52.97)	Australia	21 Aug 2004	Olympic Games	Athens, Greece	
39	3:56.30		Sophie Edington (1:01.06); Leisel Jones (1:05.51); Jessicah Schipper (56.86); Libby Lenton (52.87)	Australia	21 Mar 2006	Commonwealth Games	Melbourne, Australia	
40	3:55.74		Emily Seebohm (1:00.79); Leisel Jones (1:04.94); Jessicah Schipper (57.18); Libby Lenton (52.83)	Australia	31 Mar 2007	World Championships	Melbourne, Australia	
41	3:52.69		Emily Seebohm (59.33); Leisel Jones (1:04.58); Jessicah Schipper (56.25); Libby Trickett (52.53)	Australia	17 Aug 2008	Olympic Games	Beijing, China	
42	3:52.19		Zhao Jing (58.98); Chen Huijia (1:04.12); Jiao Liuyang (56.28); Li Zhesi (52.81)	China	1 Aug 2009	World Championships	Rome, Italy	
43	3:52.05		Missy Franklin (58.50); Rebecca Soni (1:04.82); Dana Vollmer (55.48); Allison Schmitt (53.25)	United States	4 Aug 2012	Olympic Games	London, United Kingdom	
44	3:51.55		Kathleen Baker (58.54); Lilly King (1:04.48); Kelsi Worrell (56.30); Simone Manuel (52.23)	United States	30 Jul 2017	World Championships	Budapest, Hungary	
44	3:50.40		Regan Smith (57.57 WR); Lilly King (1:04.81); Kelsi Dahlia (56.16); Simone Manuel (51.86)	United States	28 Jul 2019	World Championships	Gwangju, South Korea	
45	3:49.63		Regan Smith (57.28); Lilly King (1:04.90); Gretchen Walsh (55.03); Torri Huske (52.42)	United States	4 Aug 2024	Olympic Games	Paris, France	
46	3:49.34		Regan Smith (57.57); Kate Douglass (1:04.27); Gretchen Walsh (54.98); Torri Huske (52.52)	United States	3 Aug 2025	World Championships	Singapore, Singapore	

Legend: # – Record awaiting ratification by FINA; yd – set in a pool measured in yards; e – equalled existing record;
Records not set in finals: h – heat; sf – semifinal; r – relay 1st leg; rh – relay heat 1st leg; b – B final; † – en route to final mark; so – swim-off; tt – time trial

=== Women short course ===
#	Time	Name	Nationality	Date	Meet	Location	Ref
1	3:57.73	He Cihong (1:00.31); Dai Guohong (1:06.17); Liu Limin (59.06); Le Jingyi (52.19)	China	5 Dec 1993	World Championships	Palma de Mallorca, Spain	
2	3:57.62	Mai Nakamura (59.27); Masami Tanaka (-); Ayari Aoyama (-); Sumika Minamoto (-)	Japan	4 Apr 1999	World Championships	Hong Kong, Hong Kong	
3	3:57.46	Courtney Shealy (58.75); Kristy Kowal (1:06.09); Keegan Walkley (59.28); Maritza Correia (53.34)	United States	17 Mar 2000	Women's NCAA Championships	Indianapolis, United States	
4	3:55.78	Therese Alshammar (1:00.74); Emma Igelström (1:04.90); Anna-Karin Kammerling (57.12); Johanna Sjöberg (53.02)	Sweden	5 Apr 2002	World Championships	Moscow, Russia	
5	3:54.95	Sophie Edington (59.37); Brooke Hanson (1:05.25); Jessicah Schipper (58.28); Lisbeth Lenton (52.05)	Australia	9 Oct 2004	World Championships	Indianapolis, United States	
6	3:51.84	Tayliah Zimmer (58.54); Jade Edmistone (1:04.95); Jessicah Schipper (56.36); Lisbeth Lenton (51.99)	Australia	7 Apr 2006	World Championships	Shanghai, China	
7	3:51.36	Margaret Hoelzer (58.79); Jessica Hardy (1:03.98); Rachel Komisarz (55.93); Kara Denby (52.66)	United States	11 Apr 2008	World Championships	Manchester, United Kingdom	
8	3:49.45	Katy Murdoch (56.88); Annamay Pierse (1:03.39); Audrey Lacroix (57.29); Victoria Poon (51.89)	Canada	9 Aug 2009	British Gas Grand Prix	Leeds, United Kingdom	
9	3:47.97	Margaret Hoelzer (57.47); Jessica Hardy (1:03.58); Dana Vollmer (54.37); Amanda Weir (52.55)	United States	18 Dec 2009	Duel in the Pool	Manchester, United Kingdom	
10	3:45.56	Natalie Coughlin (55.97); Rebecca Soni (1:02.91); Dana Vollmer (55.36); Missy Franklin (51.32)	United States	16 Dec 2011	Duel in the Pool	Atlanta, United States	
11	3:45.20	Courtney Bartholomew (56.08); Katie Meili (1:02.88); Kelsi Worrell (55.01); Simone Manuel (51.23)	United States	11 December 2015	Duel in the Pool	Indianapolis, United States	
12	3:44.52	Olivia Smoliga (55.60); Lilly King (1:02.40); Kelsi Dahlia (54.79); Erika Brown (51.73)	United States (Cali Condors)	21 November 2020	International Swimming League	Budapest, Hungary	
13	3:44.35	Claire Curzan (56.47); Lilly King (1:02.88); Torri Huske (54.53); Kate Douglass (50.47)	United States	18 December 2022	World Championships	Melbourne, Australia	
14	3:40.41	Regan Smith (54.02); Lilly King (1:03.02); Gretchen Walsh (52.84); Kate Douglass (50.53)	United States	15 December 2024	World Championships	Budapest, Hungary	

Legend: # – Record awaiting ratification by FINA; e – equalled existing record;
Records not set in finals: h – heat; sf – semifinal; r – relay 1st leg; rh – relay heat 1st leg; b – B final; † – en route to final mark; so – swim-off; tt – time trial

=== Mixed long course ===
#	Time	Name	Nationality	Date	Meet	Location	Ref
1	4:13.47	Allie Day (1:06.61); Mike Hurley (1:09.81); Tanner Kurz (58.63); Haley Lips (58.42)	(United States) Indiana University Hoosiers	26 September 2013	IU Fall Frenzy	Bloomington, United States	
2	3:48.74	Andrei Shabasov; Veronika Popova; Andrei Nikolayev; Daria Ustinova	(Russia) St. Petersburg	16 May 2014	Russian Championships	Moscow, Russia	
3	3:44.02	Christopher Walker-Hebborn (53.68); Adam Peaty (59.30); Jemma Lowe (57.51); Francesca Halsall (53.53)	Great Britain	19 August 2014	European Championships	Berlin, Germany	
4	3:41.71	Christopher Walker-Hebborn (52.94); Adam Peaty (57.98); Siobhan-Marie O'Connor (57.02); Francesca Halsall (53.77)	Great Britain	5 August 2015	World Championships	Kazan, Russia	
5	3:40.28	Ryan Murphy (52.34); Kevin Cordes (58.95); Kelsi Worrell (56.17); Mallory Comerford (52.82)	United States	26 July 2017	World Championships	Budapest, Hungary	
6	3:38.56	Matt Grevers (52.32); Lilly King (1:04.15); Caeleb Dressel (49.92); Simone Manuel (52.17)	United States	26 July 2017	World Championships	Budapest, Hungary	
7	3:38.41	Xu Jiayu (52.45); Yan Zibei (57.96); Zhang Yufei (55.32); Yang Junxuan (52.68)	China	1 October 2020	Chinese Championships	Qingdao, China	
8	3:37.58	Kathleen Dawson (58.80); Adam Peaty (56.78); James Guy (50.00); Anna Hopkin (52.00)	Great Britain	31 July 2021	Olympic Games	Tokyo, Japan	
9	3:37.43	Ryan Murphy (52.08); Nic Fink (58.29); Gretchen Walsh (55.18); Torri Huske (51.88)	United States	3 August 2024	Olympic Games	Paris, France	
10	3:36.70	Will Modglin (53.40); Van Mathias (57.30); Gretchen Walsh (54.99); Kate Douglass (51.01)	United States	12 August 2026	Pan Pacific Championships	Irvine, United States	

== All-time rankings ==
Tables show data for the top 25 4 × 100 m medley relay times and the top 10 national records:
- denotes top 10 national record by teams in the top 25 4 × 100 m medley relay times
- denotes lesser performances, still in the top 25 4 × 100 m medley relay times, by repeat nations
- denotes performances in the top 25 4 × 100 m medley relay times by a team with multiple nationalities
- denotes top 10 national record for other teams who fall outside the top 25 4 × 100 m medley relay times

=== Men long course ===
- Correct as of September 2026

Nat.#	Perf.#	Time	Athletes	Team	Date	Place	Ref.
1	1	3:26.78	Ryan Murphy (52.31); Michael Andrew (58.49); Caeleb Dressel (49.03); Zach Apple (46.95)	United States	1 August 2021	Tokyo	
2	2	3:26.93	Miron Lifintsev (52.44); Kirill Prigoda (57.92); Andrey Minakov (50.17); Egor Kornev (46.40)	Russia (Note: Competed for Neutral Athletes B team.)	3 August 2025	Singapore	
3	3	3:27.01	Xu Jiayu (52.05); Qin Haiyang (57.63); Wang Changhao (50.68); Pan Zhanle (46.65)	China	26 September 2023	Hangzhou	
	4	3:27.20	Ryan Murphy (52.04); Nic Fink (58.03); Dare Rose (50.13); Jack Alexy (47.00)	US #2	30 July 2023	Fukuoka	
	5	3:27.28	Aaron Peirsol (52.19); Eric Shanteau (58.57); Michael Phelps (49.72); David Walters (46.80)	US #3	2 August 2009	Rome	
	6	3:27.46	Xu Jiayu (52.37); Qin Haiyang (57.98); Sun Jiajun (51.19); Pan Zhanle (45.92)	China #2	4 August 2024	Paris	
4	7	3:27.51	Luke Greenbank (53.63); Adam Peaty (56.53); James Guy (50.27); Duncan Scott (47.08)	Great Britain	1 August 2021	Tokyo	
4	7	3:27.51	Thomas Ceccon (51.93); Nicolò Martinenghi (57.47); Federico Burdisso (50.63); Alessandro Miressi (47.48)	Italy	25 June 2022	Budapest	
	9	3:27.79	Ryan Murphy (52.51); Nic Fink (57.86); Michael Andrew (50.06); Ryan Held (47.36)	US #4	25 June 2022	Budapest	
	10	3:27.89	Xu Jiayu (52.13); Dong Zhihao (57.94); Xu Fang (50.52); Pan Zhanle (47.30)	China #3	22 September 2026	Tokyo	
	11	3:27.91	Matt Grevers (52.26); Kevin Cordes (58.89); Caeleb Dressel (49.76); Nathan Adrian (47.00)	US #5	30 July 2017	Budapest	
	12	3:27.95	Ryan Murphy (51.85); Cody Miller (59.03); Michael Phelps (50.33); Nathan Adrian (46.74)	US #6	13 August 2016	Rio de Janeiro	
6	13	3:27.96	Yohann Ndoye-Brouard (52.26); Léon Marchand (58.44); Maxime Grousset (49.27); Yann Le Goff (47.99)	France	3 August 2025	Singapore	
	14	3:28.01	Ryan Murphy (52.44); Nic Fink (58.97); Caeleb Dressel (49.41); Hunter Armstrong (47.19)	US #7	4 August 2024	Paris	
	15	3:28.10	Luke Greenbank (53.95); Adam Peaty (57.20); James Guy (50.81); Duncan Scott (46.14)	Great Britain #2	28 July 2019	Gwangju	
	16	3:28.38	Yohann Ndoye-Brouard (52.60); Léon Marchand (58.62); Maxime Grousset (49.57); Florent Manaudou (47.59)	France #2	4 August 2024	Paris	
	17	3:28.45	Ryan Murphy (52.92); Andrew Wilson (58.65); Caeleb Dressel (49.28); Nathan Adrian (47.60)	US #8	28 July 2019	Gwangju	
	18	3:28.46	Thomas Ceccon (52.82); Nicolò Martinenghi (57.72); Matteo Rivolta (50.75); Alessandro Miressi (47.17)	Italy #2	17 August 2022	Rome	
	19	3:28.49	Miron Lifintsev (52.23); Kirill Prigoda (57.89); Roman Shevliakov (50.98); Egor Kornev (47.39)	Russia #2 (Note: Competed for the Saint-Petersburg club.)	18 April 2025	Kazan	
7	20	3:28.58	Helge Meeuw (52.27); Hendrik Feldwehr (58.51); Benjamin Starke (50.91); Paul Biedermann (46.89)	Germany	2 August 2009	Rome	
	21	3:28.59	Luke Greenbank (53.64); Adam Peaty (57.38); James Guy (50.65); Duncan Scott (46.92)	Great Britain #3	23 May 2021	Budapest	
	22	3:28.62	Tommy Janton (53.37); Josh Matheny (59.00); Dare Rose (50.30); Jack Alexy (45.95)	US #9	3 August 2025	Singapore	
8	23	3:28.64	Ashley Delaney (53.10); Brenton Rickard (57.80); Andrew Lauterstein (50.58); Matt Targett (47.16)	Australia	2 August 2009	Rome	
	24	3:28.67	Kliment Kolesnikov (53.00); Ivan Kozhakin (59.00); Andrey Minakov (50.34); Egor Kornev (46.85)	Russia #3	16 August 2026	Paris	
9	25	3:28.70	Hidekazu Takehara (53.71); Shin Ohashi (57.64); Shoon Mitsunaga (49.74); Tatsuya Murasa (47.61)	Japan	22 September 2026	Tokyo	
10		3:29.16	Guilherme Guido (53.78); Henrique Barbosa (58.68); Gabriel Mangabeira (50.48); César Cielo (46.22)	Brazil	2 August 2009	Rome	

=== Men short course ===
- Correct as of September 2026

Nat.#	Perf.#	Time	Athletes	Team	Date	Place	Ref.
	1	3:18.28	Kliment Kolesnikov (48.58); Ilya Shymanovich (55.38); Chad Le Clos (48.53); Florent Manaudou (45.79)	Energy Standard; Russia; Belarus; South Africa; France	21 November 2020	Budapest	
1	2	3:18.68	Miron Lifintsev (49.31); Kirill Prigoda (55.15); Andrey Minakov (48.80); Egor Kornev (45.42)	Russia	15 December 2024	Budapest	
2	3	3:18.98	Isaac Cooper (49.46); Joshua Yong (56.55); Matthew Temple (48.34); Kyle Chalmers (44.63)	Australia	18 December 2022	Melbourne	
2	3	3:18.98	Ryan Murphy (48.96); Nic Fink (54.88); Trenton Julian (49.19); Kieran Smith (45.95)	United States	18 December 2022	Melbourne	
	5	3:19.03	Shaine Casas (48.92); Michael Andrew (57.03); Dare Rose (48.55); Jack Alexy (44.53)	US #2	15 December 2024	Budapest	
4	6	3:19.06	Lorenzo Mora (49.48); Nicolò Martinenghi (55.52); Matteo Rivolta (48.50); Alessandro Miressi (45.56)	Italy	18 December 2022	Melbourne	
	7	3:19.16	Stanislav Donets (49.63); Sergey Geybel (56.43); Yevgeny Korotyshkin (48.35); Danila Izotov (44.75)	Russia #2	20 December 2009	Saint Petersburg	
	8	3:19.50	Guilherme Guido (49.40); Adam Peaty (54.84); Marius Kusch (49.30); Duncan Scott (45.96)	London Roar; Brazil; Great Britain; Germany; Great Britain	14 November 2020	Budapest	
	9	3:19.55	Kliment Kolesnikov (49.63); Ilya Shymanovich (55.17); Chad Le Clos (48.98); Florent Manaudou (45.77)	Energy Standard; Russia; Belarus; South Africa; France	14 November 2020	Budapest	
	10	3:19.64	Coleman Stewart (49.62); Nic Fink (55.21); Caeleb Dressel (49.21); Justin Ress (45.80)	US #3 (Note: Competed for the Cali Condors team.)	3 December 2021	Eindhoven	
	11	3:19.65	Ryan Murphy (49.36); Felipe Franca Silva (56.18); Tom Shields (48.04); Maxime Rooney (46.07)	LA Current; USA; Brazil; USA; USA	21 November 2020	Budapest	
	12	3:19.76	Lorenzo Mora (50.34); Nicolò Martinenghi (55.94); Matteo Rivolta (48.43); Alessandro Miressi (45.05)	Italy #2	21 December 2021	Abu Dhabi	
	13	3:19.91	Lorenzo Mora (49.53); Ludovico Viberti (56.15); Michele Busa (48.81); Alessandro Miressi (45.42)	Italy #3	15 December 2024	Budapest	
	14	3:19.98	Ryan Murphy (49.63); Andrew Wilson (56.84); Caeleb Dressel (48.28); Ryan Held (45.23)	US #4	16 December 2018	Hangzhou	
	15	3:20.01	Coleman Stewart (49.83); Nic Fink (56.30); Caeleb Dressel (48.18); Justin Ress (45.70)	US #5	21 November 2020	Budapest	
	16	3:20.50	Shaine Casas (50.44); Nic Fink (55.27); Trenton Julian (49.36); Ryan Held (45.43)	US #6	21 December 2021	Abu Dhabi	
	17	3:20.61	Kliment Kolesnikov (49.62); Kirill Prigoda (55.98); Mikhail Vekovishchev (50.00); Vladimir Morozov (45.01)	Russia #3	16 December 2018	Hangzhou	
	17	3:20.61	Kliment Kolesnikov (49.90); Ilya Shymanovich (55.38); Chad le Clos (48.92); Adam Barrett (46.41)	Energy Standard; Russia; Belarus; South Africa; Great Britain	3 December 2021	Eindhoven	
	19	3:20.65	Kliment Kolesnikov (49.47); Danil Semianinov (57.06); Andrey Minakov (48.81); Aleksandr Shchegolev (45.31)	Russia #4 (Note: Competed as the Russian Swimming Federation under no flag.)	21 December 2021	Abu Dhabi	
	20	3:20.67	Guilherme Guido (49.59); Adam Peaty (55.36); Marius Kusch (49.69); Duncan Scott (46.03)	London Roar; Brazil; Great Britain; Germany; Great Britain	21 November 2020	Budapest	
	21	3:20.68	Evgeny Rylov (50.14); Ilya Shymanovich (55.59); Chad Le Clos (49.18); Florent Manaudou (45.77)	Energy Standard; Russia; Belarus; South Africa; France	1 November 2020	Budapest	
	21	3:20.68	Coleman Stewart (49.82); Nic Fink (55.98); Caeleb Dressel (48.81); Justin Ress (46.07)	US #7	4 September 2021	Naples	
	23	3:20.71	Nick Thoman (48.94); Mark Gangloff (57.03); Michael Phelps (49.93); Nathan Adrian (44.81)	US #8	18 December 2009	Manchester	
	24	3:20.99	Nick Thoman (49.88); Mihail Alexandrov (56.52); Ryan Lochte (49.17); Garrett Weber-Gale (45.42)	US #9	19 December 2010	Dubai	
5	25	3:21.02	Kacper Stokowski (49.10); Jan Kałusowski (56.91); Jakub Majerski (49.16); Ksawery Masiuk (45.85)	Poland	15 December 2024	Budapest	
6		3:21.07	Ryosuke Irie (49.95); Yasuhiro Koseki (55.91); Takeshi Kawamoto (49.58); Katsumi Nakamura (45.63)	Japan	16 December 2018	Hangzhou	
7		3:21.14	Guilherme Guido (50.11); Felipe Franca Silva (56.73); Marcos Macedo (49.63); César Cielo (44.67)	Brazil	7 December 2014	Doha	
8		3:21.17	Blake Tierney (49.87); Finlay Knox (56.71); Ilya Kharun (48.66); Yuri Kisil (45.93)	Canada	15 December 2024	Budapest	
9		3:22.17	Christian Diener (50.01); Marco Koch (56.68); Marius Kusch (48.91); Damian Wierling (46.57)	Germany	16 December 2018	Hangzhou	
10		3:22.26	Florent Manaudou (50.35); Giacomo Perez-Dortona (57.00); Mehdy Metella (49.07); Clement Mignon (45.84)	France	7 December 2014	Doha	

=== Women long course ===
- Correct as of September 2026

Nat.#	Perf.#	Time	Athletes	Team	Date	Place	Ref.
1	1	3:49.34	Regan Smith (57.57); Kate Douglass (1:04.27); Gretchen Walsh (54.98); Torri Huske (52.52)	United States	3 August 2025	Singapore	
	2	3:49.63	Regan Smith (57.28); Lilly King (1:04.90); Gretchen Walsh (55.03); Torri Huske (52.42)	US #2	27 July 2024	Paris	
	3	3:50.40	Regan Smith (57.57); Lilly King (1:04.84); Kelsi Dahlia (56.14); Simone Manuel (51.86)	US #3	28 July 2019	Gwangju	
	4	3:50.43	Katharine Berkoff (58.35); McKenzie Siroky (1:05.07); Gretchen Walsh (54.78); Kate Douglass (52.23)	US #4	15 August 2026	Irvine	
	5	3:51.55	Kathleen Baker (58.54); Lilly King (1:04.48); Kelsi Dahlia (56.30); Simone Manuel (52.23)	US #5	30 July 2017	Budapest	
2	6	3:51.60	Kaylee McKeown (58.01); Chelsea Hodges (1:05.57); Emma McKeon (55.91); Cate Campbell (52.11)	Australia	1 August 2021	Tokyo	
	7	3:51.73	Regan Smith (58.05); Lydia Jacoby (1:05.03); Torri Huske (56.16); Abbey Weitzeil (52.49)	US #6	1 August 2021	Tokyo	
	8	3:52.05	Missy Franklin (58.50); Rebecca Soni (1:04.82); Dana Vollmer (55.48); Allison Schmitt (53.25)	US #7	4 August 2012	London	
	9	3:52.08	Regan Smith (57.68); Lilly King (1:04.93); Gretchen Walsh (57.06); Kate Douglass (52.41)	US #8	30 July 2023	Fukuoka	
3	10	3:52.19	Zhao Jing (58.98); Chen Huijia (1:04.12); Jiao Liuyang (56.24); Li Zhesi (52.81)	China	1 August 2009	Rome	
	11	3:52.36	Natalie Coughlin (59.12); Rebecca Soni (1:04.71); Dana Vollmer (55.74); Missy Franklin (52.79)	US #9	30 July 2011	Shanghai	
	12	3:52.58	Emily Seebohm (59.40); Sarah Katsoulis (1:04.65); Jessicah Schipper (56.19); Lisbeth Trickett (52.34)	Australia #2	1 August 2009	Rome	
4	13	3:52.60	Kylie Masse (57.90); Sydney Pickrem (1:07.17); Maggie Mac Neil (55.27); Penny Oleksiak (52.26)	Canada	1 August 2021	Tokyo	
	14	3:52.67	Kaylee McKeown (57.69); Ella Ramsay (1:06.49); Alexandria Perkins (56.26); Mollie O'Callaghan (52.23)	Áustralia #3	3 August 2025	Singapore	
	15	3:52.69	Emily Seebohm (59.33); Leisel Jones (1:04.58); Jessicah Schipper (56.25); Lisbeth Trickett (52.53)	Áustralia #4	17 August 2008	Beijing	
	16	3:52.74	Emily Seebohm (59.28); Jessica Hansen (1:05.82); Emma McKeon (56.45); Cate Campbell (51.19)	Áustralia #5	12 August 2018	Tokyo	
	17	3:53.13	Kathleen Baker (59.00); Lilly King (1:05.70); Dana Vollmer (56.00); Simone Manuel (52.43)	US #10	13 August 2016	Rio de Janeiro	
	18	3:53.21	Kathleen Baker (59.41); Lilly King (1:04.86); Kelsi Dahlia (56.72); Simone Manuel (52.22)	US #11	12 August 2018	Tokyo	
	19	3:53.23	Missy Franklin (58.39); Jessica Hardy (1:05.10); Dana Vollmer (56.31); Megan Romano (53.43)	US #12	4 August 2013	Barcelona	
	20	3:53.30	Natalie Coughlin (58.94); Rebecca Soni (1:05.95); Christine Magnuson (56.14); Dara Torres (52.27)	US #13	17 August 2008	Beijing	
	21	3:53.37	Kaylee McKeown (57.91); Abbey Harkin (1:07.07); Emma McKeon (56.44); Mollie O'Callaghan (51.95)	Australia #6	30 July 2023	Fukuoka	
5	22	3:53.38	Anastasia Fesikova (58.96); Yuliya Yefimova (1:04.03); Svetlana Chimrova (56.99); Veronika Popova (53.40)	Russia	30 July 2017	Budapest	
	23	3:53.42	Minna Atherton (59.06); Jessica Hansen (1:06.08); Emma McKeon (56.32); Cate Campbell (51.96)	Australia #7	28 July 2019	Gwangju	
6	24	3:53.50	Lauren Cox (59.67); Angharad Evans (1:03.75); Keanna Macinnes (56.81); Freya Colbert (53.27)	Great Britain	16 August 2026	Paris	
	25	3:53.58	Kylie Masse (59.12); Sydney Pickrem (1:06.42); Maggie Mac Neil (55.56); Penny Oleksiak (52.48)	Canada #2	28 July 2019	Gwangju	
7		3:53.60	Sara Curtis (58.43); Benedetta Pilato (1:04.53); Anita Gastaldi (57.07); Emma Virginia Menicucci (53.57)	Italy	16 August 2026	Paris	
8		3:54.27	Michelle Coleman (59.75); Sophie Hansson (1:05.67); Louise Hansson (56.12); Sarah Sjöström (52.73)	Sweden	1 August 2021	Tokyo	
9		3:54.73	Natsumi Sakai (59.42); Satomi Suzuki (1:05.43); Rikako Ikee (55.80); Tomomi Aoki (54.08)	Japan	23 August 2018	Jakarta	
10		3:55.01	Mie Nielsen (58.75); Rikke Møller Pedersen (1:06.62); Jeanette Ottesen (56.43); Pernille Blume (53.21)	Denmark	13 August 2016	Rio de Janeiro	

=== Women short course ===
- Correct as of September 2026

Nat.#	Perf.#	Time	Athletes	Team	Date	Place	Ref.
1	1	3:40.41	Regan Smith (54.02); Lilly King (1:03.02); Gretchen Walsh (52.84); Kate Douglass (50.53)	United States	15 December 2024	Budapest	
	2	3:44.35	Claire Curzan (56.47); Lilly King (1:02.88); Torri Huske (54.53); Kate Douglass (50.47)	US #2	18 December 2022	Melbourne	
	3	3:44.52	Olivia Smoliga (55.60); Lilly King (1:02.40); Kelsi Dahlia (54.79); Erika Brown (51.73)	US #3	21 November 2020	Budapest	
2	4	3:44.92	Kaylee McKeown (55.74); Jenna Strauch (1:04.49); Emma McKeon (53.93); Meg Harris (50.76)	Australia	18 December 2022	Melbourne	
	5	3:45.14	Kira Toussaint (56.16); Alia Atkinson (1:03.56); Marie Wattel (54.98); Freya Anderson (50.44)	London Roar; Netherlands; Jamaica; France; Great Britain	21 November 2020	Budapest	
	6	3:45.20	Courtney Bartholomew (56.08); Katie Meili (1:02.88); Kelsi Worrell (54.53); Simone Manuel (50.47)	US #4	11 December 2015	Indianapolis	
	7	3:45.56	Natalie Coughlin (55.97); Rebecca Soni (1:02.91); Dana Vollmer (55.36); Missy Franklin (51.32)	US #5	11 December 2011	Atlanta	
	8	3:45.58	Olivia Smoliga (55.86); Katie Meili (1:03.52); Kelsi Dahlia (54.89); Mallory Comerford (51.31)	US #6	11 December 2018	Hangzhou	
	8	3:45.58	Emily Seebohm (56.16); Benedetta Pilato (1:03.56); Madeline Banic (54.98); Sarah Sjöström (50.44)	Energy Standard; Australia; Italy; United States; Sweden	14 November 2020	Budapest	
	10	3:45.92	Emily Seebohm (56.39); Benedetta Pilato (1:03.46); Madeline Banic (54.85); Sarah Sjöström (51.22)	Energy Standard; Australia; Italy; United States; Sweden	21 November 2020	Budapest	
3	11	3:46.20	Louise Hansson (56.25); Sophie Hansson (1:03.70); Sarah Sjöström (54.65); Michelle Coleman (51.60)	Sweden	21 December 2021	Abu Dhabi	
4	12	3:46.22	Ingrid Wilm (55.36); Sydney Pickrem (1:04.42); Maggie Mac Neil (54.59); Taylor Ruck (51.85)	Canada	18 December 2022	Melbourne	
	13	3:46.28	Kira Toussaint (56.28); Alia Atkinson (1:03.53); Marie Wattel (55.80); Emma McKeon (50.67)	London Roar; Netherlands; Jamaica; France; Australia	20 November 2021	Eindhoven	
	14	3:46.59	Kira Toussaint (56.67); Alia Atkinson (1:03.73); Madeline Banic (55.14); Freya Anderson (50.67)	London Roar; Netherlands; Jamaica; United States; Great Britain	14 November 2020	Budapest	
	15	3:46.82	Olivia Smoliga (55.98); Lilly King (1:03.48); Kelsi Dahlia (55.70); Mallory Comerford (51.66)	US #7	21 December 2019	Las Vegas	
	16	3:46.95	Emily Seebohm (56.98); Benedetta Pilato (1:03.96); Anastasiya Shkurdai (55.34); Sarah Sjöström (50.67)	Energy Standard; Australia; Italy; Belarus; Sweden	21 November 2020	Budapest	
	17	3:46.99	Minna Atherton (55.35); Sydney Pickrem (1:04.38); Emma McKeon (55.70); Cate Campbell (51.56)	London Roar; Australia; Canada; Australia; Australia	24 November 2019	London	
	18	3:47.13	Olivia Smoliga (56.24); Lilly King (1:03.03); Kelsi Dahlia (56.37); Erika Brown (51.49)	US #8	9 November 2020	Budapest	
	19	3:47.17	Kira Toussaint (55.81); Alia Atkinson (1:04.21); Marie Wattel (56.13); Emma McKeon (51.02)	London Roar; Netherlands; Jamaica; France; Australia	13 November 2021	Eindhoven	
	20	3:47.27	Minna Atherton (55.98); Sarah Vasey (1:05.21); Emma McKeon (55.70); Cate Campbell (51.66)	London Roar; Australia; Great Britain; Australia; Australia	21 December 2019	Las Vegas	
	21	3:47.36	Kylie Masse (55.76); Sydney Pickrem (1:04.97); Maggie Mac Neil (55.30); Kayla Sanchez (51.33)	Canada #2	24 November 2021	Abu Dhabi	
	22	3:47.39	Minna Atherton (55.98); Jessica Hansen (1:03.83); Marie Wattel (56.74); Cate Campbell (51.70)	London Roar; Australia; Australia; France; Australia	27 October 2019	Budapest	
5	23	3:47.41	Peng Xuwei (57.12); Tang Qianting (1:03.25); Zhang Yufei (54.93); Cheng Yujie (52.11)	China	21 December 2021	Abu Dhabi	
	24	3:47.44	Beata Nelson (56.36); Lilly King (1:03.59); Kelsi Dahlia (55.53); Erika Brown (51.96)	US #9	20 November 2021	Eindhoven	
	25	3:47.45	Olivia Smoliga (56.36); Lilly King (1:03.59); Kelsi Dahlia (55.53); Mallory Comerford (51.96)	US #10	17 November 2019	College Park	
6		3:47.70	Kira Toussaint (56.53); Tes Schouten (1:05.28); Maaike de Waard (55.42); Marrit Steenbergen (50.47)	Netherlands	18 December 2022	Melbourne	
7		3:47.84	Abbie Wood (57.44); Angharad Evans (1:03.18); Eva Okaro (56.11); Freya Anderson (51.11)	Great Britain	15 December 2024	Budapest	
8		3:48.86	Mie Nielsen (56.86); Rikke Møller-Pedersen (1:04.62); Jeanette Ottesen (54.99); Pernille Blume (52.39)	Denmark	7 December 2014	Doha	
9		3:49.35	Elizaveta Agapitova (58.16); Evgeniia Chikunova (1:03.26); Arina Surkova (56.48); Daria Klepikova (51.45)	Russia	15 December 2024	Budapest	
10		3:50.28	Emi Moronuki (58.25); Miho Teramura (1:03.56); Rikako Ikee (55.43); Tomomi Aoki (53.04)	Japan	11 December 2016	Windsor	
10		3:50.28	Pauline Mahieu (57.22); Charlotte Bonnet (1:04.12); Béryl Gastaldello (56.20); Mary-Ambre Moluh (52.74)	France	18 December 2022	Melbourne	

=== Mixed long course ===
- Correct as of September 2026

Nat.#	Perf.#	Time	Athletes	Team	Date	Place	Ref.
1	1	3:36.70	Will Modglin (53.40); Van Mathias (57.30); Gretchen Walsh (54.99); Kate Douglass (51.01)	United States	12 August 2026	Irvine	
	2	3:37.43	Ryan Murphy (52.08); Nic Fink (58.29); Gretchen Walsh (55.18); Torri Huske (51.88)	US #2	3 August 2024	Paris	
2	3	3:37.55	Xu Jiayu (52.13); Qin Haiyang (57.82); Zhang Yufei (55.64); Yang Junxuan (51.96)	China	3 August 2024	Paris	
3	4	3:37.58	Kathleen Dawson (58.80); Adam Peaty (56.78); James Guy (50.00); Anna Hopkin (52.00)	Great Britain	31 July 2021	Tokyo	
	5	3:37.73	Xu Jiayu (51.91); Qin Haiyang (57.25); Zhang Yufei (56.05); Yang Junxuan (52.52)	China #2	27 September 2023	Hangzhou	
4	6	3:37.97	Miron Lifintsev (51.78); Kirill Prigoda (57.56); Daria Klepikova (55.97); Daria Trofimova (52.66)	Russia	30 July 2025	Singapore	
	7	3:38.41	Xu Jiayu (52.45); Yan Zibei (57.96); Zhang Yufei (55.32); Yang Junxuan (52.68)	China #3	1 October 2020	Qingdao	
	8	3:38.56	Matt Grevers (52.32); Lilly King (1:04.15); Caeleb Dressel (49.92); Simone Manuel (52.17)	US #3	26 July 2017	Budapest	
	9	3:38.57	Xu Jiayu (52.42); Qin Haiyang (57.31); Zhang Yufei (55.69); Cheng Yujie (53.15)	China #4	26 July 2023	Fukuoka	
	10	3:38.75	Kathleen Dawson (58.50); Adam Peaty (57.08); James Guy (50.58); Freya Anderson (52.59)	Great Britain #2	29 July 2021	Tokyo	
5	11	3:38.76	Kaylee McKeown (57.90); Joshua Yong (58.43); Matthew Temple (50.42); Mollie O'Callaghan (52.01)	Australia	3 August 2024	Paris	
	12	3:38.79	Hunter Armstrong (52.14); Nic Fink (57.86); Torri Huske (56.17); Claire Curzan (52.62)	US #4	21 June 2022	Budapest	
	13	3:38.82	Kathleen Dawson (58.43); Adam Peaty (57.13); James Guy (50.61); Freya Anderson (52.65)	Great Britain #3	20 May 2021	Budapest	
	14	3:38.86	Xu Jiayu (52.56); Yan Zibei (58.11); Zhang Yufei (55.48); Yang Junxuan (52.71)	China #5	31 July 2021	Tokyo	
	15	3:38.91	Mitch Larkin (53.08); Jake Packard (58.68); Emma McKeon (56.22); Cate Campbell (50.93)	Australia #2	9 August 2018	Tokyo	
	16	3:38.95	Kaylee McKeown (58.14); Zac Stubblety-Cook (58.82); Matthew Temple (50.26); Emma McKeon (51.73)	Australia #3	31 July 2021	Tokyo	
	17	3:39.03	Kaylee McKeown (58.03); Zac Stubblety-Cook (58.84); Matthew Temple (50.63); Shayna Jack (51.53)	Australia #4	26 July 2023	Fukuoka	
	18	3:39.08	Mitch Larkin (53.47); Matthew Wilson (58.37); Emma McKeon (56.14); Cate Campbell (51.10)	Australia #5	24 July 2019	Gwangju	
	19	3:39.10	Ryan Murphy (52.46); Lilly King (1:04.94); Caeleb Dressel (49.33); Simone Manuel (52.37)	US #5	24 July 2019	Gwangju	
6	20	3:39.28	Thomas Ceccon (52.23); Nicolò Martinenghi (57.73); Elena Di Liddo (56.62); Federica Pellegrini (52.20)	Italy	31 July 2021	Tokyo	
	21	3:39.30	Iona Anderson (59.14); Sam Williamson (58.50); Matthew Temple (49.60); Meg Harris (52.06)	Australia #6	12 August 2026	Irvine	
7	22	3:39.64	Mary-Ambre Moluh (57.99); Carl Aitkaci (59.05); Maxime Grousset (49.66); Marie Wattel (52.94)	France	11 August 2026	Paris	
	23	3:39.99	Xu Jiayu (53.23); Qin Haiyang (58.14); Zhang Yufei (55.96); Wu Qingfeng (52.66)	China #6	30 July 2025	Singapore	
	24	3:40.18	Georgia Davies (59.12); Adam Peaty (57.27); James Guy (50.96); Freya Anderson (52.83)	Great Britain #4	6 August 2018	Glasgow	
	25	3:40.19	Ryan Murphy (52.02); Nic Fink (58.19); Torri Huske (58.19); Kate Douglass (51.79)	US #6	26 July 2023	Fukuoka	
8		3:40.90	Kylie Masse (58.69); Oliver Dawson (59.63); Joshua Liendo (49.64); Taylor Ruck (52.94)	Canada	30 July 2025	Singapore	
9		3:40.97	Kai van Westering (54.03); Caspar Corbeau (58.74); Tessa Giele (56.29); Marrit Steenbergen (51.91)	Netherlands	30 July 2025	Singapore	
10		3:40.98	Ryosuke Irie (52.83); Yasuhiro Koseki (58.57); Rikako Ikee (55.53); Tomomi Aoki (54.05)	Japan	9 August 2018	Tokyo	

=== Mixed short course ===
- Correct as of September 2026

Nat.#	Perf.#	Time	Athletes	Team	Date	Place	Ref.
1	1	3:30.47	Miron Lifintsev (48.90); Kirill Prigoda (54.86); Arina Surkova (55.63); Daria Klepikova (51.08)	Russia	14 December 2024	Budapest	
2	2	3:30.55	Regan Smith (54.19); Lilly King (1:03.05); Dare Rose (48.68); Jack Alexy (44.63)	United States	14 December 2024	Budapest	
	3	3:30.94	Evgeny Rylov (48.90); Ilya Shymanovich (55.88); Anastasiya Shkurdai (55.07); Sarah Sjöström (51.09)	Energy Standard; Russia; Belarus; Belarus; Sweden	4 December 2021	Eindhoven	
	4	3:31.94	Coleman Stewart (49.54); Nic Fink (55.58); Kelsi Dahlia (54.97); Erika Brown (51.85)	US #2	4 December 2021	Eindhoven	
	5	3:31.96	Evgeny Rylov (49.52); Ilya Shymanovich (55.39); Anastasiya Shkurdai (55.85); Sarah Sjöström (51.20)	Energy Standard; Russia; Belarus; Belarus; Sweden	19 September 2021	Naples	
3	6	3:31.97	Ingrid Wilm (55.82); Finlay Knox (56.39); Ilya Kharun (48.27); Mary-Sophie Harvey (51.49)	Canada	14 December 2024	Budapest	
	7	3:32.62	Evgeny Rylov (50.05); Ilya Shymanovich (55.63); Anastasiya Shkurdai (56.07); Sarah Sjöström (50.87)	Energy Standard; Russia; Belarus; Belarus; Sweden	12 November 2021	Eindhoven	
4	8	3:32.83	Iona Anderson (55.89); Joshua Yong (56.40); Matthew Temple (48.63); Milla Jansen (51.91)	Australia	14 December 2024	Budapest	
	9	3:33.11	Evgeny Rylov (49.90); Ilya Shymanovich (55.82); Anastasiya Shkurdai (56.34); Femke Heemskerk (51.05)	Energy Standard; Russia; Belarus; Belarus; Netherlands	19 November 2021	Eindhoven	
	10	3:33.32	Simona Kubová (56.88); Ilya Shymanovich (55.15); Chad Le Clos (49.89); Sarah Sjöström (51.40)	Energy Standard; Czech Republic; Belarus; South Africa; Sweden	26 November 2021	Eindhoven	
	11	3:33.79	Coleman Stewart (50.16); Nic Fink (56.86); Kelsi Dahlia (54.89); Natalie Hinds (51.88)	US #3	21 November 2021	Eindhoven	
	12	3:33.81	Ingrid Wilm (55.98); Christopher Rothbauer (57.94); Tom Shields (48.54); Abbey Weitzeil (51.35)	LA Current; Canada; Austria; United States; United States	5 September 2021	Naples	
	13	3:34.15	Ingrid Wilm (55.90); Christopher Rothbauer (57.90); Tom Shields (49.0); Abbey Weitzeil (51.35)	LA Current; Canada; Austria; United States; United States	10 September 2021	Naples	
	14	3:34.30	Shaine Casas (50.04); AJ Pouch (56.76); Alex Shackell (55.70); Alex Walsh (51.80)	US #4	14 December 2024	Budapest	
	15	3:34.31	Iona Anderson (56.29); Joshua Yong (56.46); Matthew Temple (48.84); Milla Jansen (52.72)	Australia #2	14 December 2024	Budapest	
	16	3:34.49	Kliment Kolesnikov (50.77); Ilya Shymanovich (55.66); Anastasiya Shkurdai (56.58); Sarah Sjöström (51.48)	Energy Standard; Russia; Belarus; Belarus; Sweden	24 September 2021	Naples	
	17	3:34.53	Guilherme Guido (48.58); Alia Atkinson (55.38); Emma McKeon (48.53); Kyle Chalmers (45.79)	London Roar; Brazil; Jamaica; Australia; Australia	19 September 2021	Naples	
	18	3:34.70	Ingrid Wilm (56.09); Javier Acevedo (57.42); Maxime Rooney (49.85); Abbey Weitzeil (51.34)	LA Current; Canada; Canada; United States; United States	14 November 2021	Eindhoven	
	19	3:34.71	Kliment Kolesnikov (49.80); Felipe Lima (57.25); Madeline Banic (56.11); Femke Heemskerk (51.55)	Energy Standard; Russia; Brazil; United States; Netherlands	4 December 2021	Eindhoven	
	20	3:34.92	Beata Nelson (56.69); Nic Fink (56.82); José Ángel Martínez (49.89); Erika Brown (51.52)	Cali Condors; United States; United States; Mexico; United States	28 November 2021	Eindhoven	
	21	3:34.94	Thomas Ceccon (50.73); Arno Kamminga (55.95); Elena Di Liddo (56.58); Maria Kameneva (51.68)	Aqua Centurions; Italy; Netherlands; Italy; Russia	28 November 2021	Eindhoven	
	22	3:35.04	Coleman Stewart (48.58); Nic Fink (55.38); Kelsi Dahlia (48.53); Natalie Hinds (45.79)	US #5	12 November 2021	Eindhoven	
	23	3:35.19	Kylie Masse (56.47); Fabian Schwingenschlögl (56.61); Hryhory Pekarski (50.33); Katarzyna Wasick (51.78)	Toronto Titans; Canada; Germany; Belarus; Poland	28 November 2021	Eindhoven	
5	24	3:35.30	Maaike de Waard (56.66); Caspar Corbeau (56.69); Nyls Korstanje (49.75); Milou van Wijk (52.20)	Netherlands	14 December 2024	Budapest	
	25	3:35.46	Ryan Murphy (49.22); Javier Acevedo (55.38); Anna Ntountounaki (48.53); Abbey Weitzeil (45.79)	LA Current; United States; Canada; Greece; United States	4 December 2021	Eindhoven	
6	25	3:35.46	Oliver Morgan (50.53); Angharad Evans (1:03.44); Joshua Gammon (50.00); Eva Okaro (51.49)	Great Britain	14 December 2024	Budapest	
7		3:35.52	Carmen Weiler (56.97); Carles Coll (56.53); Mario Mollá (49.19); María Daza (52.73)	Spain	14 December 2024	Budapest	
8		3:35.54	Lorenzo Mora (50.11); Ludovico Viberti (57.03); Elena Capretta (56.77); Sara Curtis (51.58)	Italy	14 December 2024	Budapest	
9		3:37.36	Masaki Yura (51.23); Taku Taniguchi (56.44); Mizuki Hirai (56.07); Yume Jinno (53.62)	Japan	14 December 2024	Budapest	
10		3:37.71	Ruard van Renen (50.07); Rebecca Meder (1:04.81); Chad le Clos (49.57); Caitlin de Lange (53.26)	South Africa	14 December 2024	Budapest	

== Olympic champions ==
=== Men ===
Edition	Winner	Time	Notes	Ref.
(Italy) Rome 1960	United States	4:05.4	WR	
(Japan) Tokyo 1964	United States	3:58.4	WR	
Mexico City 1968	United States	3:54.9	WR	
(West Germany) Munich 1972	United States	3:48.16	WR	
(Canada) Montreal 1976	United States	3:42.22	WR	
(Soviet Union) Moscow 1980	Australia	3:45.70		
(United States) Los Angeles 1984	United States	3:39.30	WR	
(South Korea) Seoul 1988	United States	3:36.93	WR	
(Spain) Barcelona 1992	United States	3:36.93	=WR	
(United States) Atlanta 1996	United States	3:34.84	WR	
(Australia) Sydney 2000	United States	3:33.73	WR	
(Greece) Athens 2004	United States	3:30.68	WR	
(China) Beijing 2008	United States	3:29.34	WR	
(United Kingdom) London 2012	United States	3:29.35		
(Brazil) Rio de Janeiro 2016	United States	3:27.95	OR	
(Japan) Tokyo 2020	United States	3:26.78	WR	
(France) Paris 2024	China	3:27.46		

=== Women ===
Edition	Winner	Time	Notes	Ref.
(Italy) Rome 1960	United States	4:41.1	WR	
(Japan) Tokyo 1964	United States	4:33.9	OR	
Mexico City 1968	United States	4:28.3	OR	
(West Germany) Munich 1972	United States	4:20.75	WR	
(Canada) Montreal 1976	East Germany	4:07.95	WR	
(Soviet Union) Moscow 1980	East Germany	4:06.67	WR	
(United States) Los Angeles 1984	United States	4:08.34		
(South Korea) Seoul 1988	East Germany	4:03.74	OR	
(Spain) Barcelona 1992	United States	4:02.54	WR	
(United States) Atlanta 1996	United States	4:02.88		
(Australia) Sydney 2000	United States	3:58.30	WR	
(Greece) Athens 2004	Australia	3:57.32	WR	
(China) Beijing 2008	Australia	3:52.69	WR	
(United Kingdom) London 2012	United States	3:52.05	WR	
(Brazil) Rio de Janeiro 2016	United States	3:53.13		
(Japan) Tokyo 2020	Australia	3:51.60	OR	
(France) Paris 2024	United States	3:49.63	WR	

=== Mixed ===
Edition	Winner	Time	Notes	Ref.
(Japan) Tokyo 2020	Great Britain	3:37.58	WR	
(France) Paris 2024	United States	3:37.43	WR	

== World champions (long course) ==
=== Men ===
Edition	Winner	Time	Notes	Ref.
(Socialist Federal Republic of Yugoslavia) Belgrade 1973	United States (USA)	3:49.49	CR	
(Colombia) Cali 1975	United States (USA)	3:49.00	CR	
(West Germany) West Berlin 1978	United States (USA)	3:44.63	CR	
(Ecuador) Guayaquil 1982	United States (USA)	3:40.84	WR	
(Spain) Madrid 1986	United States (USA)	3:41.25		
(Australia) Perth 1991	United States (USA)	3:39.66	CR	
(Italy) Rome 1994	United States (USA)	3:37.74	CR	
(Australia) Perth 1998	Australia (AUS)	3:37.98		
(Japan) Fukuoka 2001	Australia (AUS)	3:35.35	CR	
(Spain) Barcelona 2003	United States (USA)	3:31.54	WR	
(Canada) Montreal 2005	United States (USA)	3:31.85		
(Australia) Melbourne 2007	Australia (AUS)	3:34.93		
(Italy) Rome 2009	United States (USA)	3:27.28	WR	
(China) Shanghai 2011	United States (USA)	3:32.06		
(Spain) Barcelona 2013	France (FRA)	3:31.51		
(Russia) Kazan 2015	United States (USA)	3:29.93		
(Hungary) Budapest 2017	United States (USA)	3:27.91		
(South Korea) Gwangju 2019	Great Britain (GBR)	3:28.10		
(Hungary) Budapest 2022	Italy (ITA)	3:27.51		
(Japan) Fukuoka 2023	United States (USA)	3:27.20	CR	
(Qatar) Doha 2024	United States (USA)	3:29.80		
Singapore 2025	Neutral Athletes B (NAB)	3:26.93	CR	

=== Women ===
Edition	Winner	Time	Notes	Ref.
(Socialist Federal Republic of Yugoslavia) Belgrade 1973	East Germany (GDR)	4:16.84	WR	
(Colombia) Cali 1975	East Germany (GDR)	4:14.74	CR	
(West Germany) West Berlin 1978	United States (USA)	4:08.21	CR	
(Ecuador) Guayaquil 1982	East Germany (GDR)	4:05.88	WR	
(Spain) Madrid 1986	East Germany (GDR)	4:04.82	CR	
(Australia) Perth 1991	United States (USA)	4:06.51		
(Italy) Rome 1994	China (CHN)	4:01.67	WR	
(Australia) Perth 1998	United States (USA)	4:01.93		
(Japan) Fukuoka 2001	Australia (AUS)	4:01.50	CR	
(Spain) Barcelona 2003	United States (USA)	3:59.89	CR	
(Canada) Montreal 2005	Australia (AUS)	3:57.47	CR	
(Australia) Melbourne 2007	Australia (AUS)	3:55.74	WR	
(Italy) Rome 2009	China (CHN)	3:52.19	WR	
(China) Shanghai 2011	United States (USA)	3:52.36		
(Spain) Barcelona 2013	United States (USA)	3:53.23		
(Russia) Kazan 2015	China (CHN)	3:54.41		
(Hungary) Budapest 2017	United States (USA)	3:51.55	WR	
(South Korea) Gwangju 2019	United States (USA)	3:50.40	WR	
(Hungary) Budapest 2022	United States (USA)	3:53.78		
(Japan) Fukuoka 2023	United States (USA)	3:52.08		
(Qatar) Doha 2024	Australia (AUS)	3:55.98		
Singapore 2025	United States (USA)	3:49.34	WR	

=== Mixed ===
Edition	Winner	Time	Notes	Ref.
(Russia) Kazan 2015	Great Britain (GBR)	3:41.71	WR	
(Hungary) Budapest 2017	United States (USA)	3:38.56	WR	
(South Korea) Gwangju 2019	Australia (AUS)	3:39.08		
(Hungary) Budapest 2022	United States (USA)	3:38.79		
(Japan) Fukuoka 2023	China (CHN)	3:38.57		
(Qatar) Doha 2024	United States (USA)	3:40.22		
Singapore 2025	Neutral Athletes B (NAB)	3:37.97	CR	

== World champions (short course) ==
=== Men ===
Edition	Winner	Time	Notes	Ref.
(Spain) Palma de Mallorca 1993	United States (USA)	3:32.57	WR	
(Brazil) Rio de Janeiro 1995	New Zealand (NZL)	3:35.69		
(Sweden) Gothenburg 1997	Australia (AUS)	3:30.66	WR	
Hong Kong 1999	Australia (AUS)	3:29.88	WR	
(Greece) Athens 2000	United States (USA)	3:30.03		
(Russia) Moscow 2002	United States (USA)	3:29.00	WR	
(United States) Indianapolis 2004	United States (USA)	3:25.09	WR	
(China) Shanghai 2006	Australia (AUS)	3:27.71		
(United Kingdom) Manchester 2008	Russia (RUS)	3:24.29	WR	
(United Arab Emirates) Dubai 2010	United States (USA)	3:20.99	CR	
(Turkey) Istanbul 2012	United States (USA)	3:21.03		
(Qatar) Doha 2014	Brazil (BRA)	3:21.14		
(Canada) Windsor 2016	Russia (RUS)	3:21.17		
(China) Hangzhou 2018	United States (USA)	3:19.98	CR	
(United Arab Emirates) Abu Dhabi 2021	Italy (ITA)	3:19.76	CR	
(Australia) Melbourne 2022	Australia (AUS)	3:18.98	WR	
(Australia) Melbourne 2022	United States (USA)	3:18.98	WR	
(Hungary) Budapest 2024	Neutral Athletes B (NAB)	3:18.68	WR	

=== Women ===
Edition	Winner	Time	Notes	Ref.
(Spain) Palma de Mallorca 1993	China (CHN)	3:57.73	WR	
(Brazil) Rio de Janeiro 1995	Australia (AUS)	4:00.46		
(Sweden) Gothenburg 1997	China (CHN)	3:57.83		
Hong Kong 1999	Japan (JPN)	3:57.62	WR	
(Greece) Athens 2000	Sweden (SWE)	3:59.53		
(Russia) Moscow 2002	Sweden (SWE)	3:55.78	WR	
(United States) Indianapolis 2004	Australia (AUS)	3:54.95	WR	
(China) Shanghai 2006	Australia (AUS)	3:51.84	WR	
(United Kingdom) Manchester 2008	United States (USA)	3:51.36	WR	
(United Arab Emirates) Dubai 2010	China (CHN)	3:48.29	CR	
(Turkey) Istanbul 2012	Denmark (DEN)	3:49.87		
(Qatar) Doha 2014	Denmark (DEN)	3:48.86		
(Canada) Windsor 2016	United States (USA)	3:47.89	CR	
(China) Hangzhou 2018	United States (USA)	3:45.58	CR	
(United Arab Emirates) Abu Dhabi 2021	Sweden (SWE)	3:46.20		
(Australia) Melbourne 2022	United States (USA)	3:44.35	WR	
(Hungary) Budapest 2024	United States (USA)	3:40.41	WR	

=== Mixed ===
Edition	Winner	Time	Notes	Ref.
(Hungary) Budapest 2024	Neutral Athletes B (NAB)	3:30.47		
