= Jopie van Alphen =

Dutch backstroke swimmer

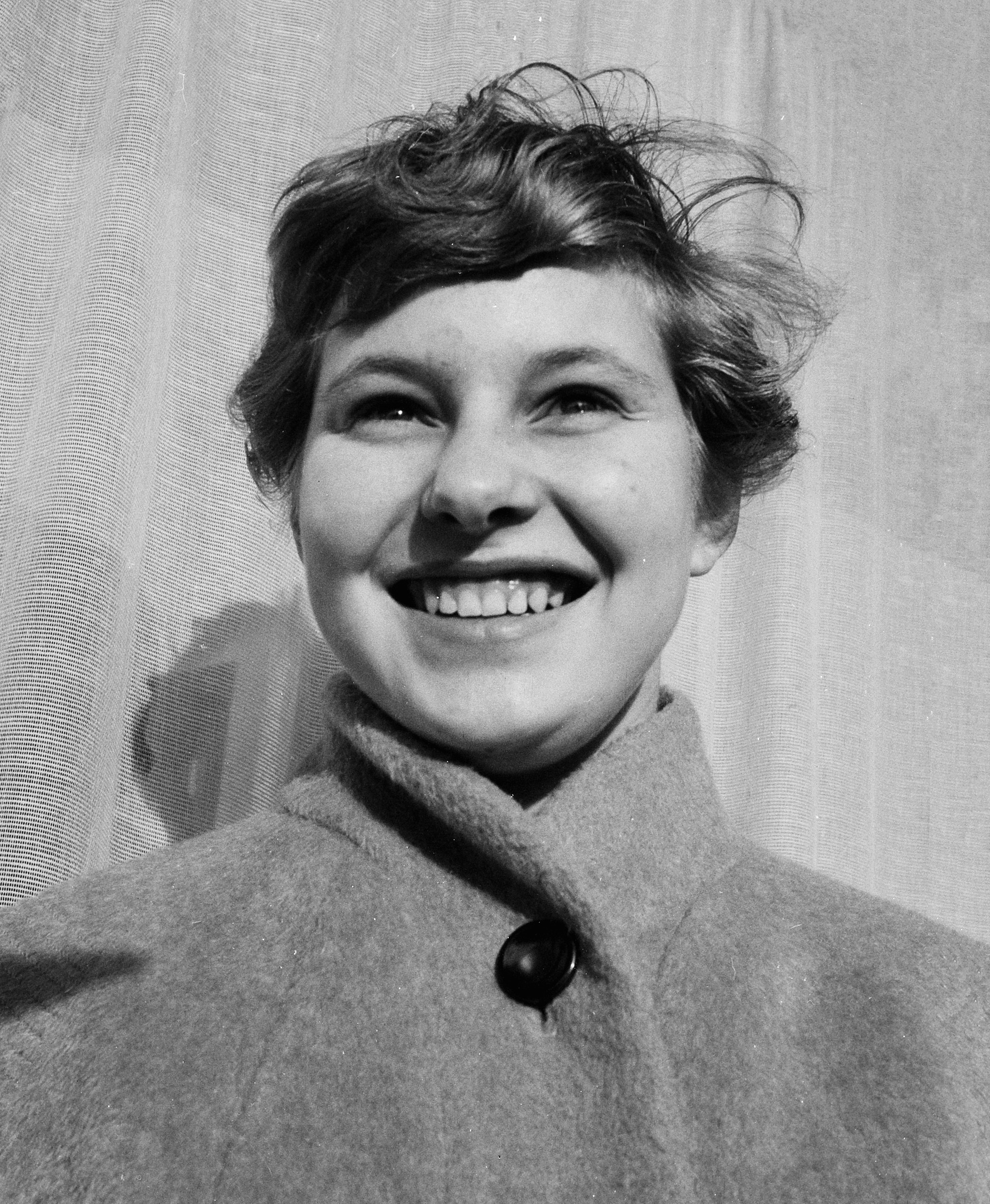
- Jopie van Alphen in 1955

Personal information
- Born: 12 May 1940 (age 86) Rotterdam, the Netherlands

Sport
- Sport: Swimming

Jopie van Alphen (born 12 May 1940) is a retired Dutch backstroke swimmer. She was part of the 4 × 100 m medley relay team (with Rika Bruins, Atie Voorbij, Hetty Balkenende) that set a new world record on 17 July 1955 in Paris.
