= Hetty Balkenende =

Dutch synchronized swimmer

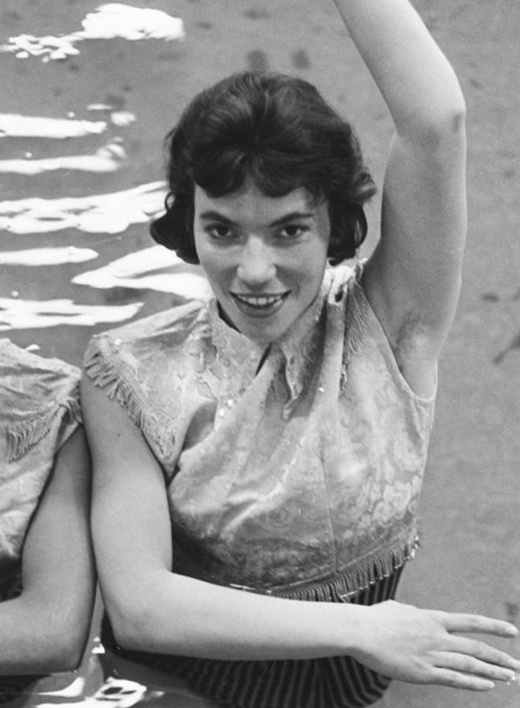
- Hetty Balkenende in 1966

Personal information
- Born: 1939 (age 86–87) Amsterdam ?

Sport
- Sport: Swimming, synchronized swimming
- Club: ZAR
Medal record
Women's Swimming
Representing the Netherlands
European Championships (LC)
Silver medal – second place	1954 Turin	4×100 m freestyle

Hetty Balkenende (also spelled Hettie, born 1939) is a Dutch former freestyle swimmer and synchronized swimmer who won a silver medal in the 4×100 m freestyle relay at the 1954 European Aquatics Championships. In 1955, she helped the Dutch team (that also included Rika Bruins, Atie Voorbij, and Jopie van Alphen) set the world record in the same event; she also won two national titles (100 m and 400 m freestyle), broke two national records in the 400 m freestyle, and the world record over 880 yards – all in one year. She was selected for the Dutch Olympic team, but the Netherlands boycotted the 1956 Summer Olympics in protest over the Soviet handling of the Hungarian uprising, so Balkenende missed the opportunity to acquire an Olympic medal.

After retiring from competitive swimming, she switched to synchronized swimming and became the unofficial European champion at the 1963 European Championships for all three routines (solo, pair, and technical). She married Jens Svensson on 15 April 1967. As a Norwegian, Hetty Svensson-Balkenende won the national and Scandinavian/Nordic championships synchronized swimming in 1970.
