= Greetje Kraan =

Dutch swimmer

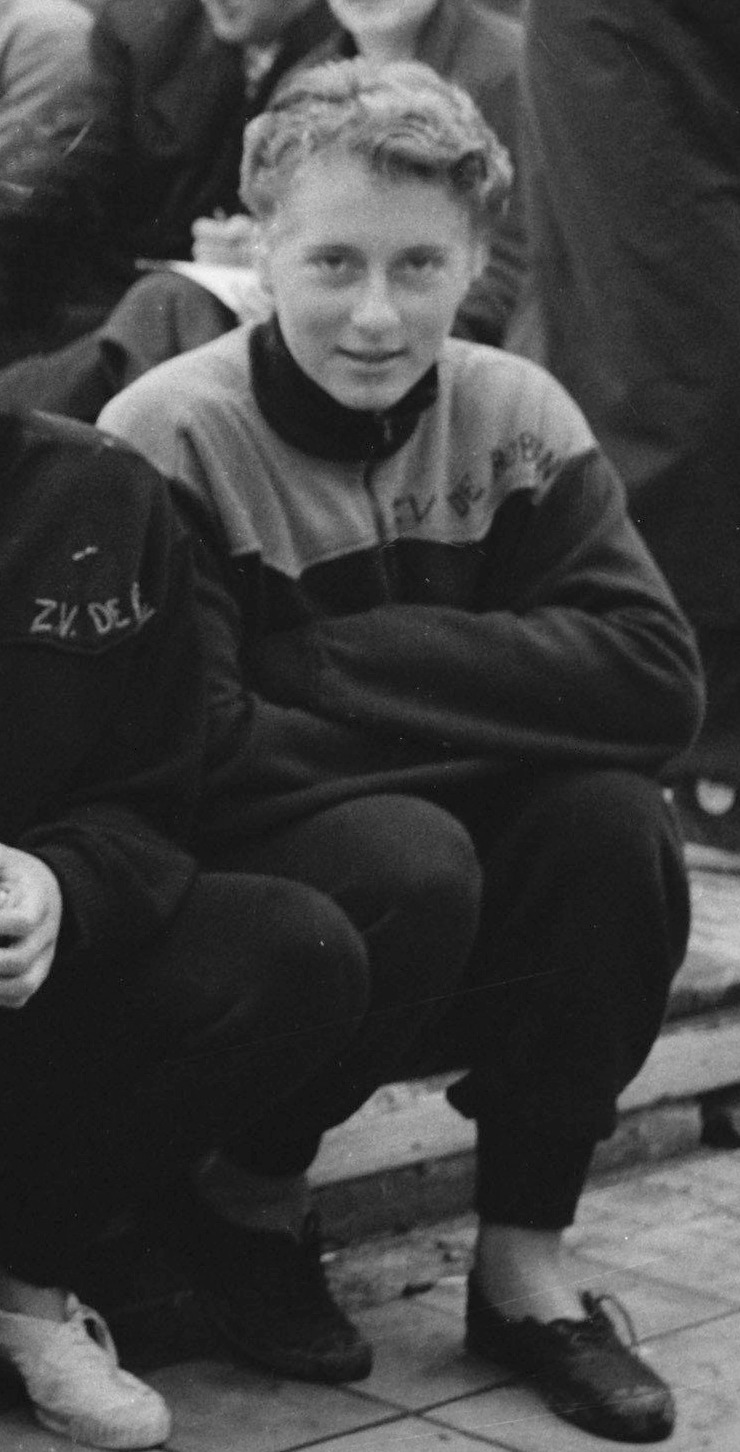
- Kraan in 1956

Sport
- Sport: Swimming
- Strokes: Freestyle, backstroke
Medal record
Representing the Netherlands
European Championships
Gold medal – first place	1958 Budapest	4×100 m freestyle

Greetje Kraan (sometimes misspelled as Geertje) is a former Dutch swimmer. As part of the national team, she won the 1958 European Aquatics Championships in the 4 × 100 m freestyle relay and broke two world records in the 4 × 100 m medley relay (1956 and 1957). In 1957, she also set a European record in the 100 m freestyle (25 m pool).
