= Pyotr Skripchenkov =

Professional Swimmer

Personal information
- Born: 14 February 1926
- Died: 2010 (aged 84)

Sport
- Sport: Swimming
- Club: CSKA Moscow

Pyotr Grigoryevich Skripchenkov (Russian: Пётр Григорьевич Скрипченков; 14 February 1926 – 2010) competed in the period when butterfly was being split from breaststroke as a separate swimming style, and Skripchenkov was one of the first Soviet swimmers who mastered the butterfly. In 1952, he took part in the Summer Olympics in the 200 m breaststroke, when butterfly was not an Olympic event yet. In 1953–1954 he swam the butterfly leg in the 4 × 100 m medley relay and helped the Soviet team to set three world records. Between 1949 and 1954 he won two national titles and set five national records. He later competed in the masters category, mostly in the 50 m butterfly event, in which he won the world championships in 1990 and several national titles.

During World War II, he enlisted to the Soviet Army in 1944 and went up to Berlin with the infantry.
