= Lev Balandin =

Soviet swimmer (1934–1980)

Personal information
- Born: 9 September 1934 Gorky, Russian SFSR, Soviet Union
- Died: 1980 Moscow, Soviet Union

Sport
- Sport: Swimming
- Club: Dynamo Gorky, CSKA Moscow
Medal record
Men's swimming
Representing Soviet Union
European Championships
Silver medal – second place	1954 Turin	100 m freestyle
Bronze medal – third place	1954 Turin	4×200 m freestyle

Lev Nikolayevich Balandin (Russian: Лев Николаевич Баландин; 1934–1980) was a Soviet swimmer who won two medals at the 1954 European Aquatics Championships. He also competed at the 1952 and 1956 Summer Olympics in three freestyle events, but was eliminated in the preliminaries.

During his career he set four world records and seven European records in relay events. He also won 10 national titles in the 4 × 200 m freestyle (1951–1954), 4 × 100 m medley (1953–1955) and 100 m freestyle (1954–1956).

Balandin was born in Nizhny Novgorod but in the early 1950s moved to Moscow. He was married to Ida Petrovna Balandina (1931–2001) who was also a competitive swimmer.

Balandin died in 1980 in Moscow. He was buried at the Vagankovo Cemetery.
