= Vladimir Minashkin =

Russian swimmer (1928–2000)

Personal information
- Nationality: Russian
- Born: 1928 Leningrad, USSR
- Died: 2000 (aged 71–72) Saint Petersburg, Russia

Sport
- Sport: Swimming
- Strokes: Breaststroke
Medal record
Men's swimming
Representing Soviet Union
European Championships
Gold medal – first place	1958 Budapest	4×100 m medley

Vladimir Minashkin (also Minachkin, Russian: Владимир Иванович Минашкин; 1928–2000) was a Russian breaststroke swimmer. Between 1953 and 1957 he set eight world records, four in the 100 m breaststroke and four in the 4×100 m medley relay. He also broke a European record in the 200 m breaststroke in 1954 and won a gold medal at the 1958 European Aquatics Championships in the medley relay.

Nationally, between 1953 and 1959 he won six championships and set 13 records (USSR). In the 1990s, until 1998, he competed in the masters category and set 20 national records (Russia).
