= Viktor Solovyov (swimmer) =

Russian swimmer

Personal information
- Born: 1932 (age 93–94)

Sport
- Sport: Swimming
- Club: CSKA Moscow

Viktor Solovyov (Russian: Виктор Соловьёв; born 1932) is a retired Russian competitive swimmer.

Solovyov competed at the 1952 Summer Olympics in the 100 m backstroke event but did not reach the finals. In 1953–1954, he swam the backstroke leg in the 4 × 100 m medley and helped the Soviet team set three world records.

Between 1950 and 1955 Solovyov won eight national titles and set six national records in backstroke disciplines. He later competed in the masters category, mostly in the 50 m backstroke event, in which he won a silver medal at the European championships in 1997.
