= Odette Lusien =

French swimmer

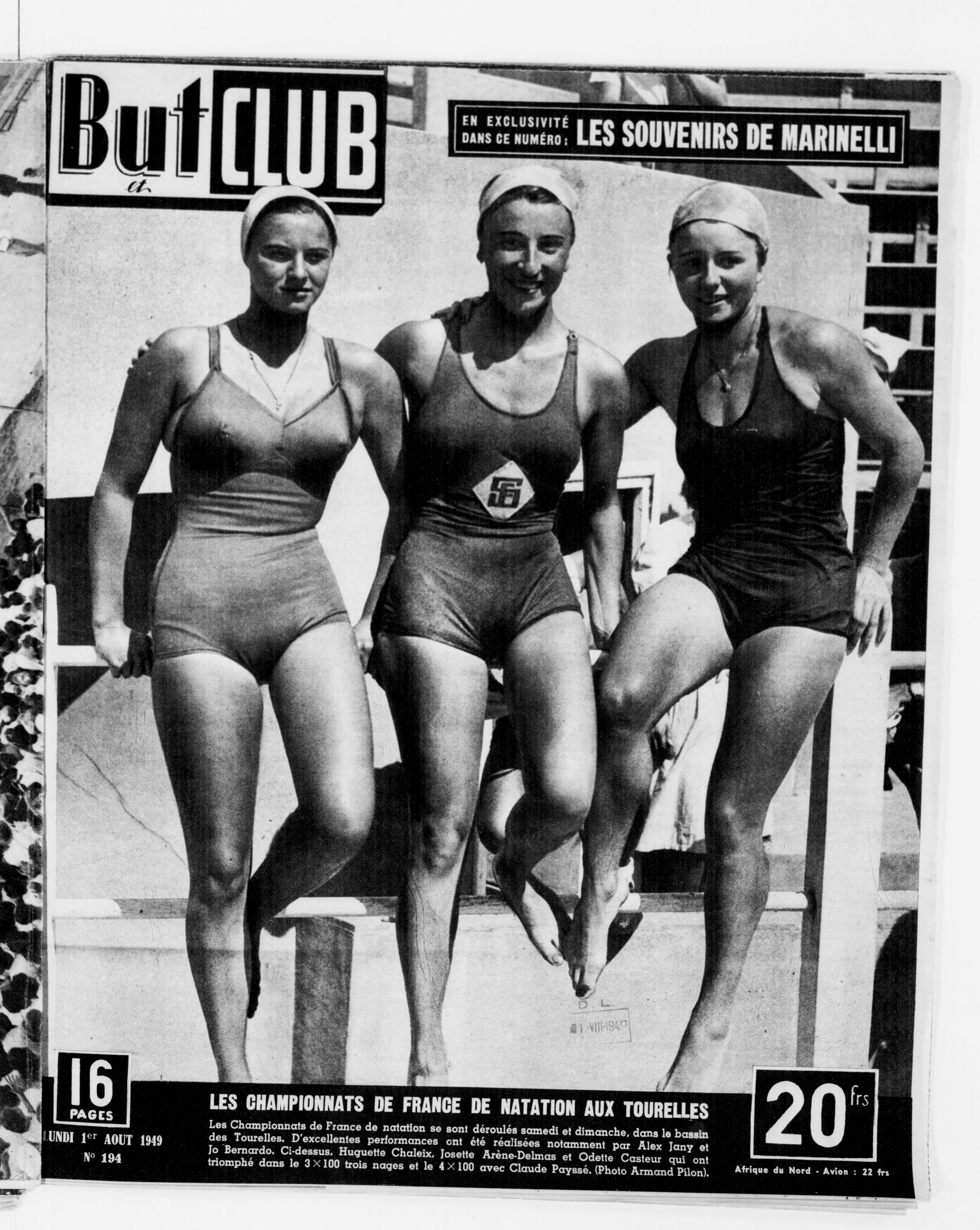
- Josette Arène (middle) and Odette Lusien (left) at the French Swimming National Championships in 1949 at the Piscine des Tourelles.

Personal information
- Born: November 11, 1927
- Died: March 12, 2007 (aged 79)

Sport
- Sport: Swimming
- Strokes: Breaststroke, butterfly

Odette Lusien (11 November 1927 – 12 March 2007) was a French swimmer who competed in the 1952 Summer Olympics and the 1956 Summer Olympics.
