= Pierre Joly dit Dumesnil =

French swimmer

Personal information
- Nationality: French
- Born: 10 December 1931 (age 94)

Sport
- Sport: Swimming

Pierre Joly dit Dumesnil (born 10 December 1931) is a French former swimmer. He competed in the men's 200 metre breaststroke at the 1952 Summer Olympics.
