= Rika Bruins =

Dutch swimmer (1934–2025)

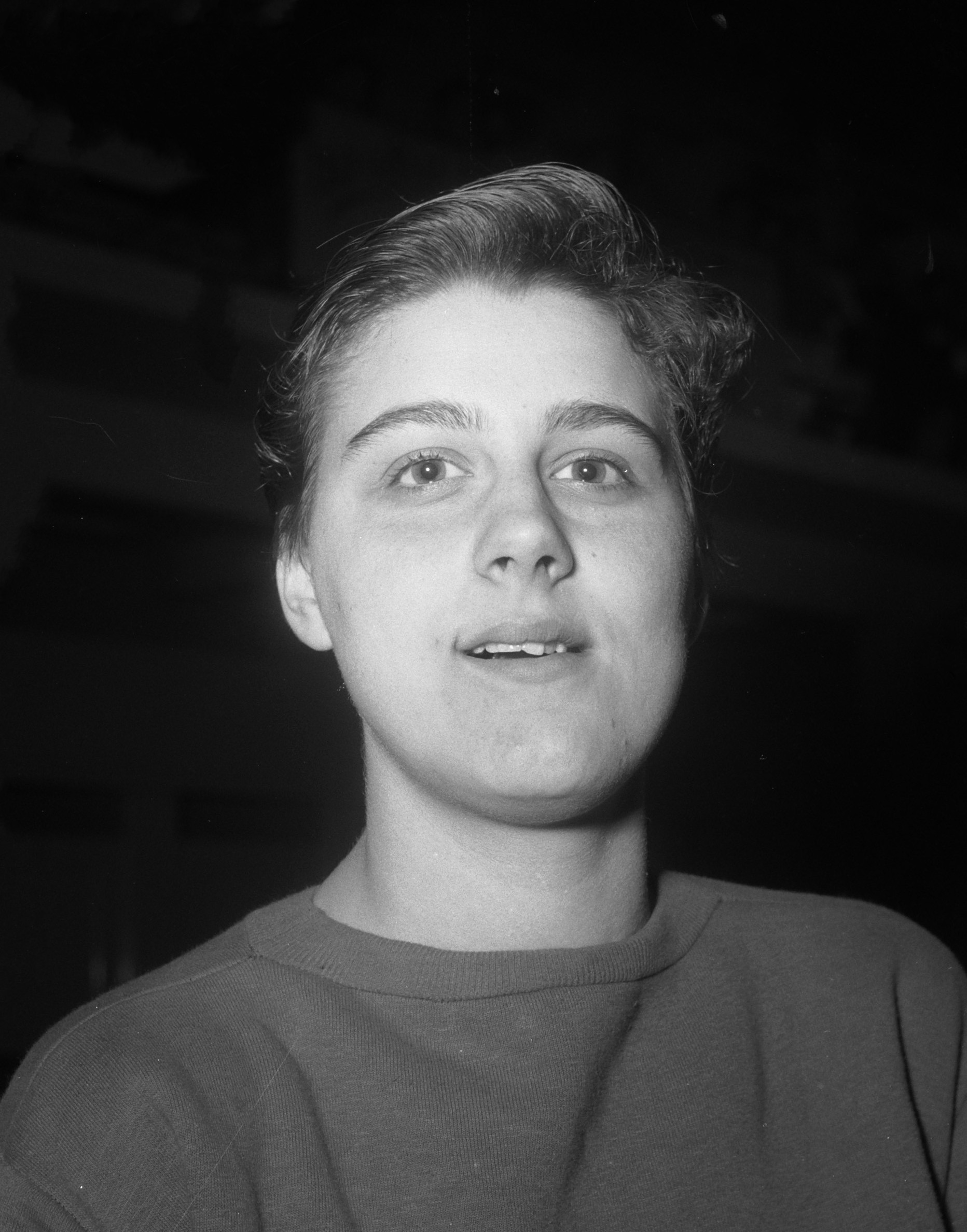
- Bruins in 1952

Personal information
- Born: 12 June 1934 Groningen, Netherlands
- Died: February 2025 (aged 90) Groningen, Netherlands

Sport
- Sport: Swimming
- Club: GZ&PC, Groningen

Henderika "Rika" Bruins (12 June 1934 – February 2025) was a Dutch swimmer.

Bruins, who grew up near the Groningen Noorderbad, started swimming at the age of seven.

She competed at the 1952 Summer Olympics in the 200 m breaststroke but failed to reach the final. She was part of Dutch teams that set world records in the 4 × 100 m medley relay in 1954 and 1955.

Bruins died in February 2025, at the age of 90.
