= Alphen =

Alphen may refer to:

== Places ==
=== Netherlands ===
- Alphen, Gelderland, a village in the municipality West Maas en Waal (province of Gelderland)
- Alphen, North Brabant, a village in the municipality Alphen-Chaam (province of North Brabant)
- Alphen, South Holland, a former municipality, including Alphen aan den Rijn
  - Alphen aan den Rijn, a town in the province of South Holland

=== South Africa ===
- Alphen, a neighborhood in Cape Town

== Other uses ==
- Corinne Alphen (born 1954), American model, Penthouse Pet of the Month and actress
- Alphen Class, a class of dry cargo ships built in the 1960s for Safmarine

== See also ==
- Van Alphen, a surname
