= Van Alphen =

Van Alphen is a Dutch toponymic surname indicating an origin in Alphen in South Holland, Alphen in North Brabant, Alphen in Gelderland, Alpen (once "Alphen") in North Rhine-Westphalia, or Teralfene in Flemish Brabant. Notable people with the surname include:

- Dick van Alphen (1938–2009), Dutch-born Australian soccer player
- Hans Van Alphen (born 1982), Belgian decathlete
- Hieronymus van Alphen (1746–1803), Dutch Treasurer-General and children's poet
- Isaac Van Alphen (f. 1881), Postmaster General of the South African Republic
- John Van Alphen (1914–1961), Belgian footballer and manager
- Jopie van Alphen (born 1940), Dutch swimmer

== See also ==
- De Haas–van Alphen effect, discovered by Wander Johannes de Haas and his student Pieter M. van Alphen (1906–1967)
- 20 van Alphen, road running race held in Alphen aan den Rijn
