= Tot Voordeel en Genoegen =

Dutch windmill

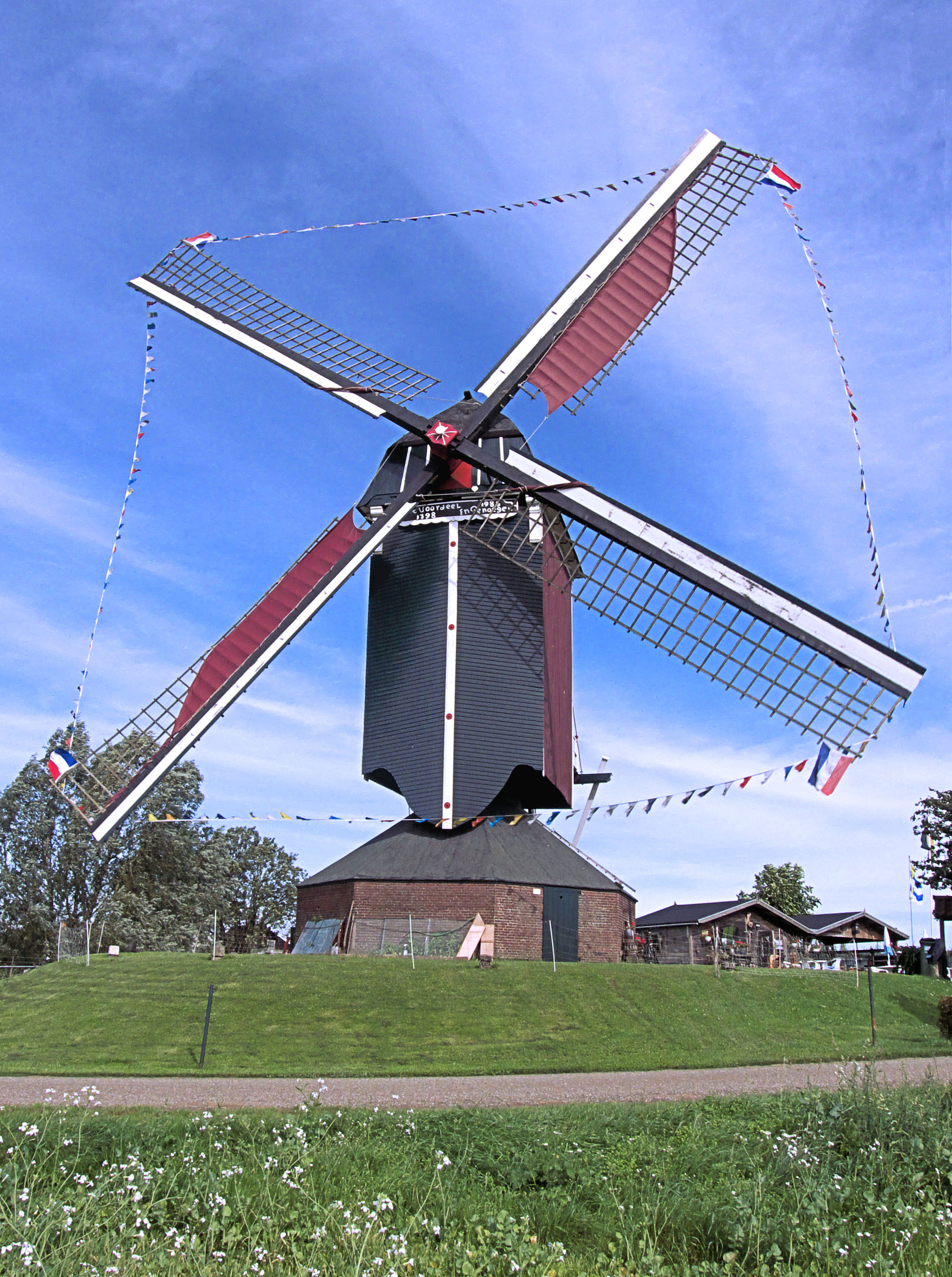
- Tot Voordeel en Genoegen, September 2011

Origin
- Mill location: Alphen, Gelderland
- Coordinates: 51.815283°N 5.463177°E
- Year built: 1798

Information
- Purpose: Grinding flour
- Type: Post mill with roundhouse
- No. of sails: 4
- Winding: yes

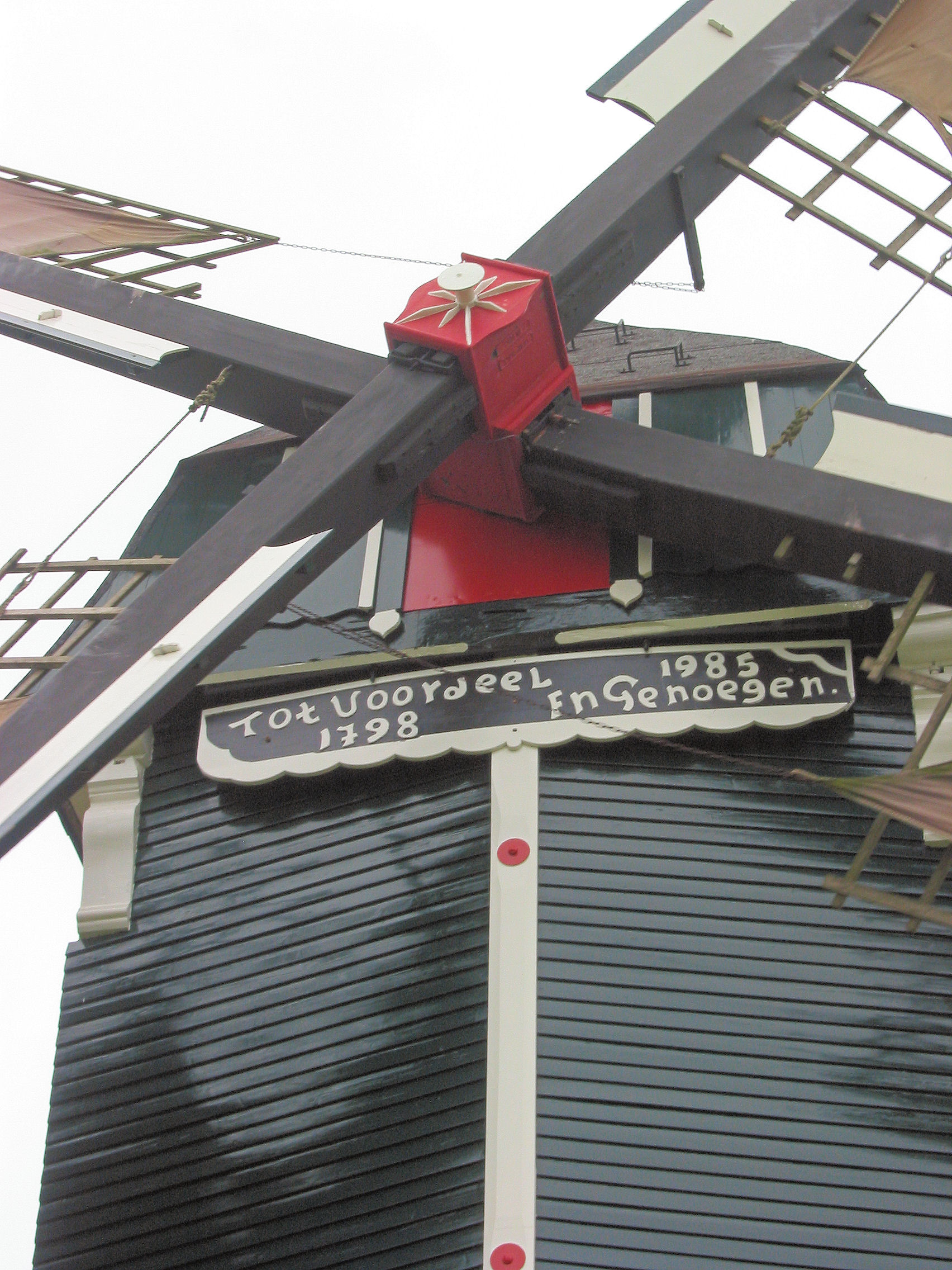

Tot Voordeel en Genoegen (Profit and Pleasure) is a windmill built in 1798 on the Molendijk 15 in Alphen, Netherlands. It is a large post mill, built above a roundhouse, used for grinding wheat flour. It is the only windmill in the Netherlands that drives three pairs of millstones. The mechanism is mostly wooden, since iron was expensive when it was built. The windmill, which is still functional, can be rotated on its post to face the wind for maximum effect.

== History ==
"Tot Voordeel en Genoegen" (to advantage and satisfaction) was built in 1798 for P. van Dam. It is beside the river so it catches as much wind as possible. The last miller to own and operate it was van Dreumel, to whom farmers in the Alphen area regularly brought their flour to be ground until 1978. The municipality of West Maas en Waal now owns the mill, which is still functional, and may be visited for tours and demonstrations. The mill was completely restored in 1964, and moved about 25 metres (82 ft). The post is no longer elm, but is now made from bilinga wood. The sides of the box are now also made from this wood.

== Description ==
The windmill's sails have a wingspan of 25 metres (82 ft). The whole upper part of the mill is built around a vertical timber post about 70 centimetres (28 in) thick. The upper part, which weighs 40,000 kilograms (88,000 lb), can be turned on this axis to orient the blades so they get maximum force from the wind. The lower part of the windmill is a brick roundhouse. The ropes are made from flax, which was once grown in the area, and the gears are wooden. Use of iron was avoided wherever possible due to the cost.

The mill is unique in having three sets of millstones, each of which can be operated independently. The main drive from the upper wheel turns the forward wheel, which in turn drives the two rear wheels. This differs from most post mills, where there are two sets of millstones, each driven directly by the upper wheel. The forward and the left rear mills have artificial stones with a diameter of 150 centimetres (59 in). The right rear mill uses natural stone with a diameter of 120 centimetres (47 in).

== Owners ==
Owners have been:

- 1798–1825: P. Dam
- 1825–1850: A. Peters
- 1850–1860: J. van Brink
- 1860–1978: van Dreumel family
- 1978–present: City of West Maas en Waal (currently managed by miller Jeg Li)

== Gallery ==
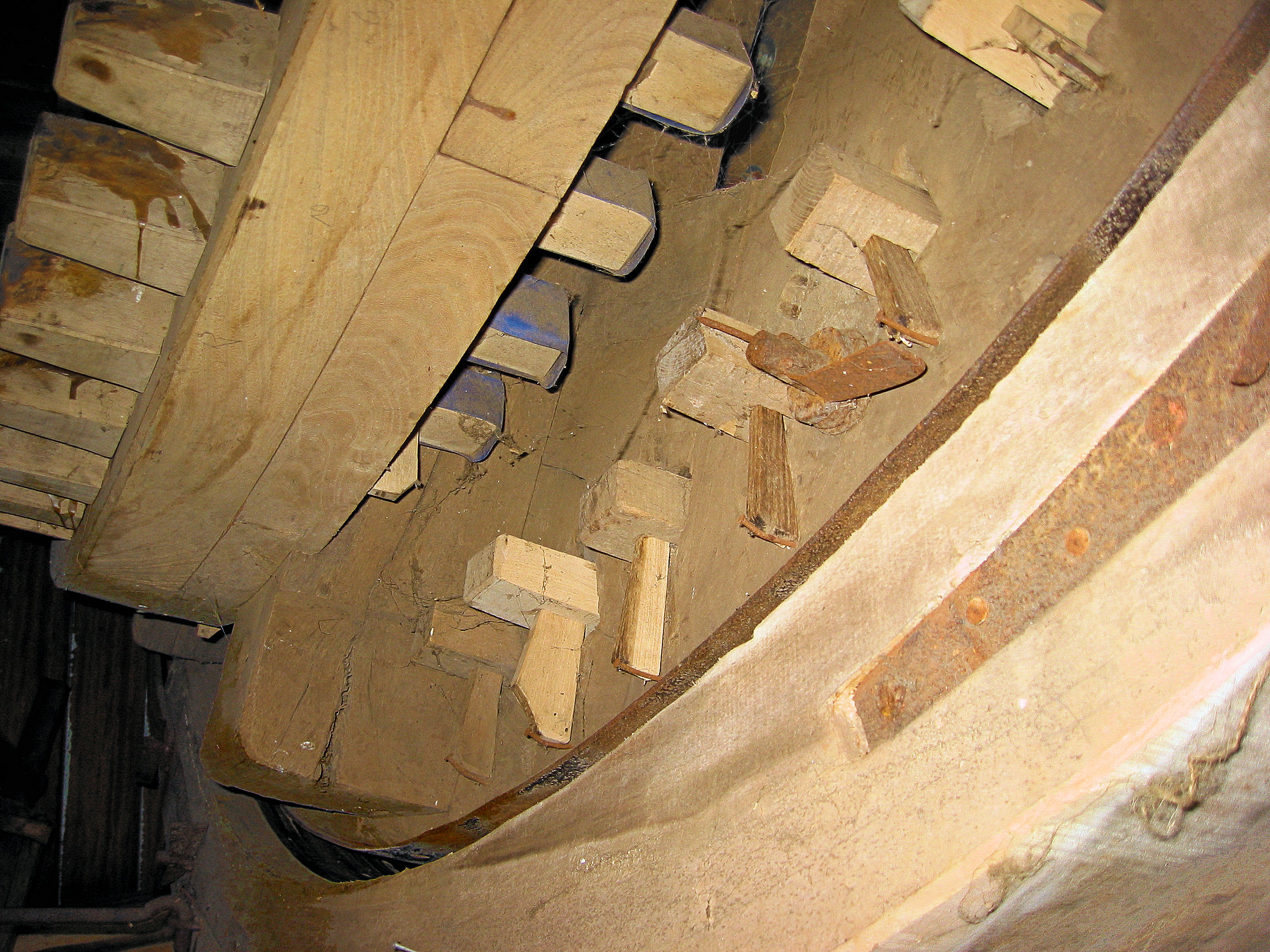
Upper left back wheel with the sprocket

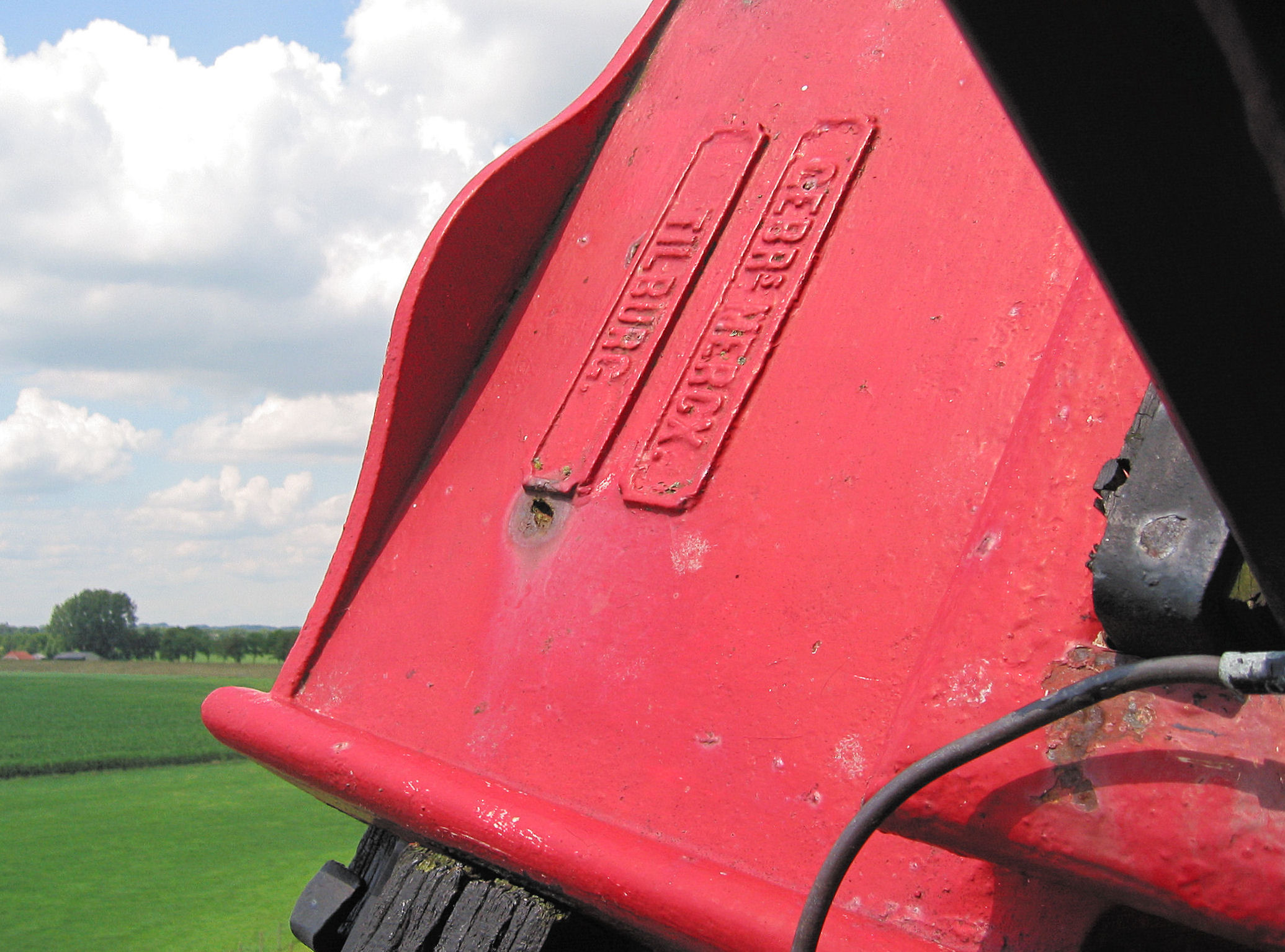
Axle head

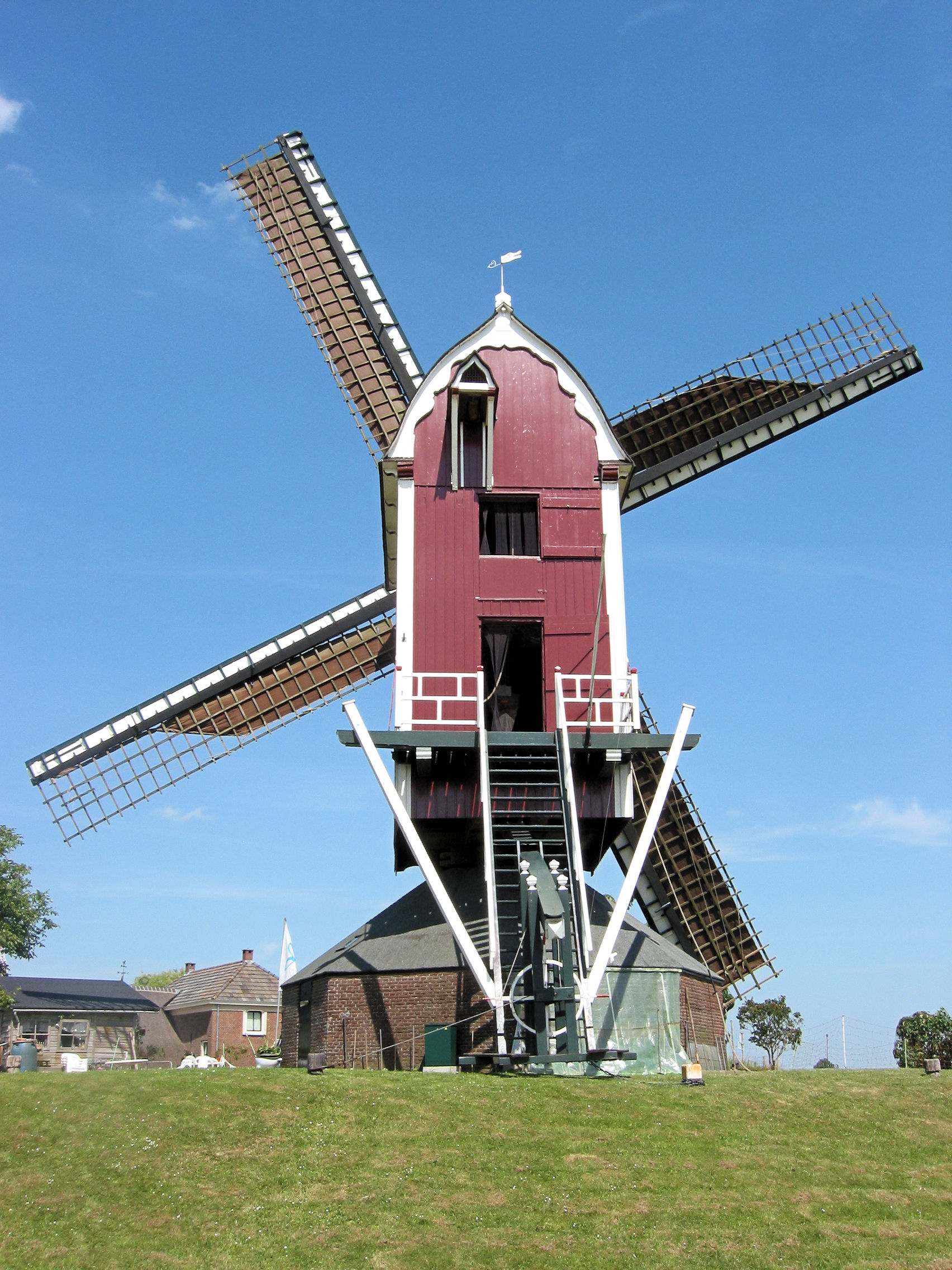
Stair Truss

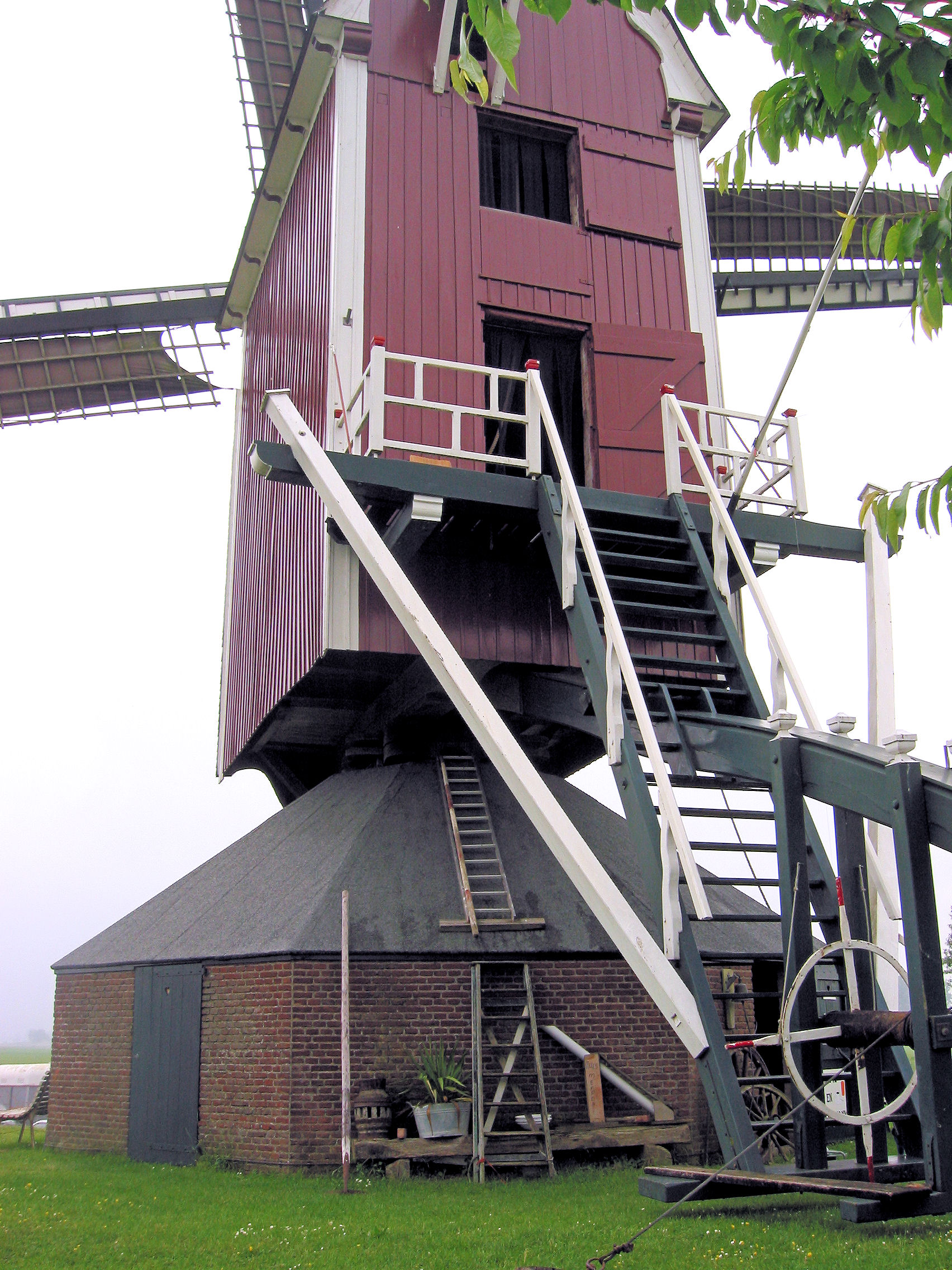
Stair Truss

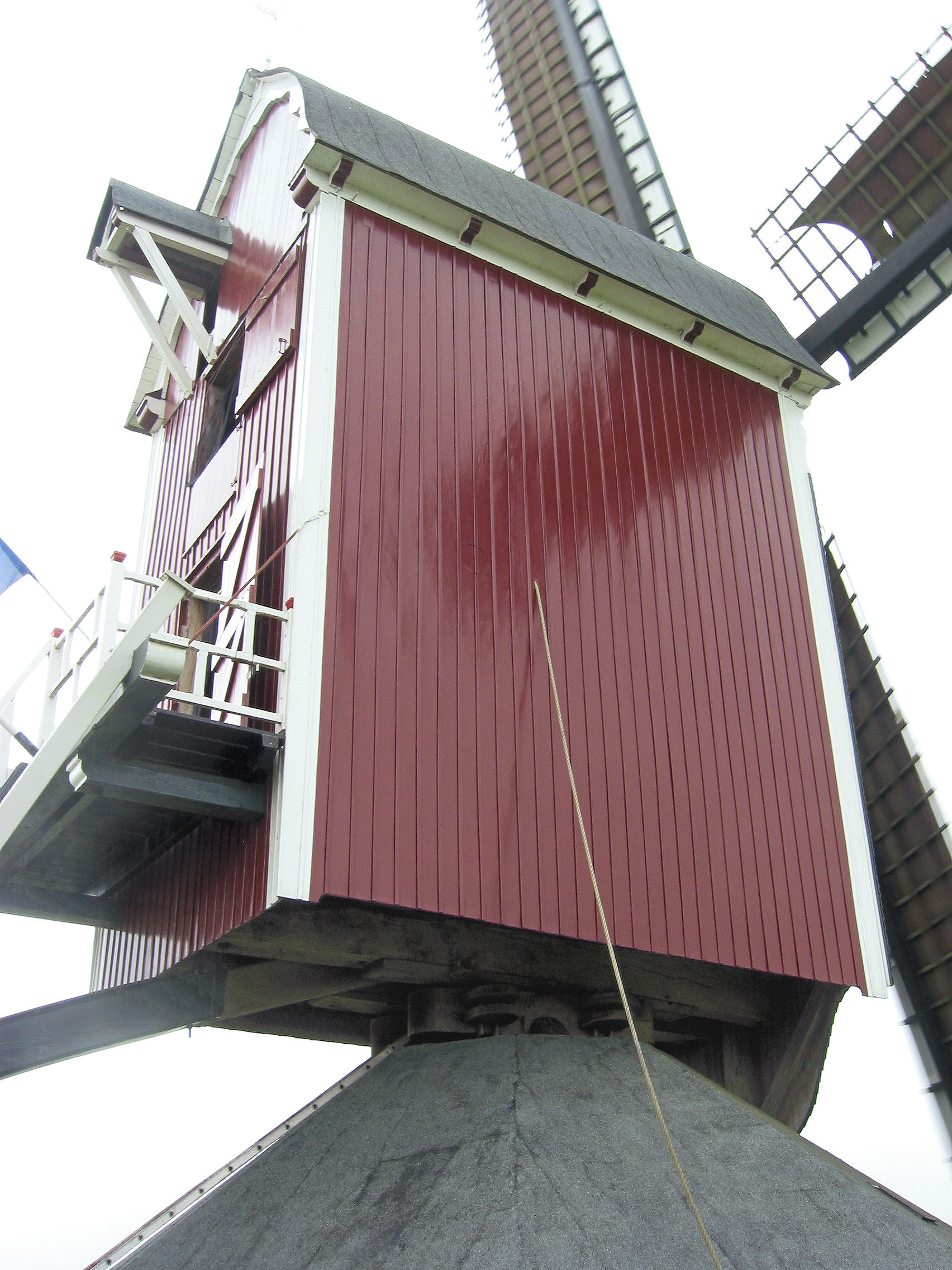
Closet

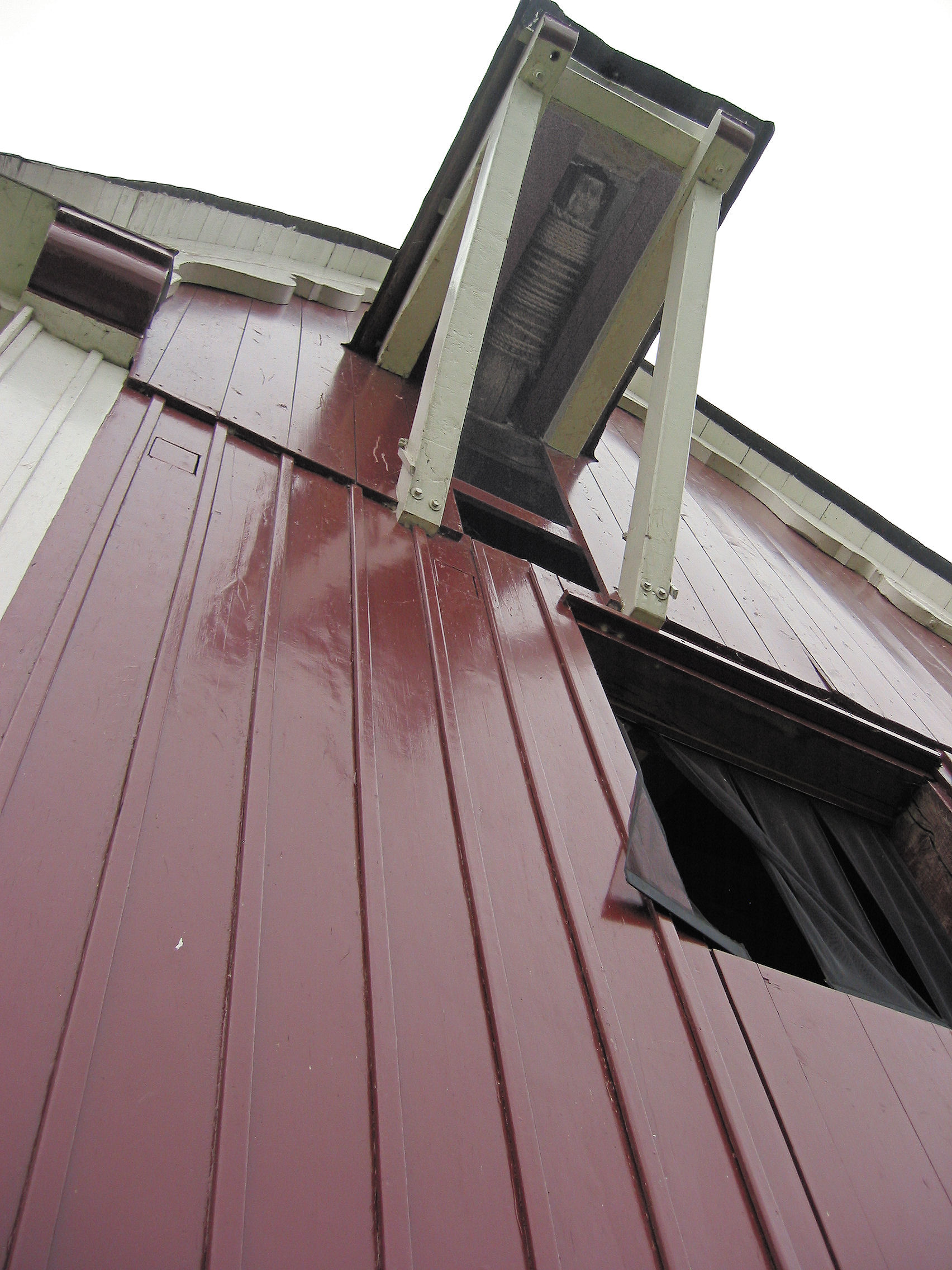
Hatch Cover

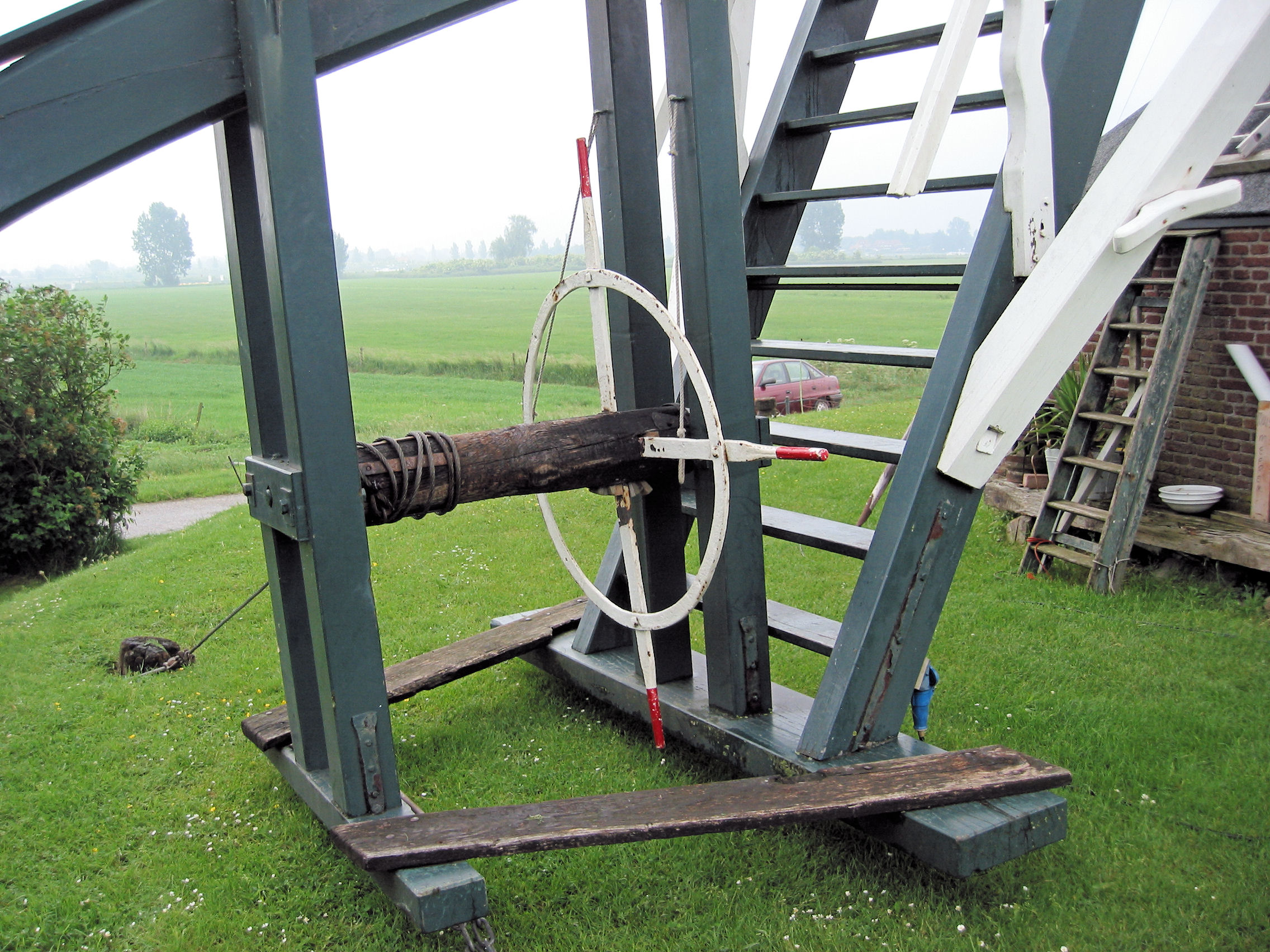
Platform, known in Dutch as a kruibank, for the operation of a capstan wheel to turn the sails into the wind

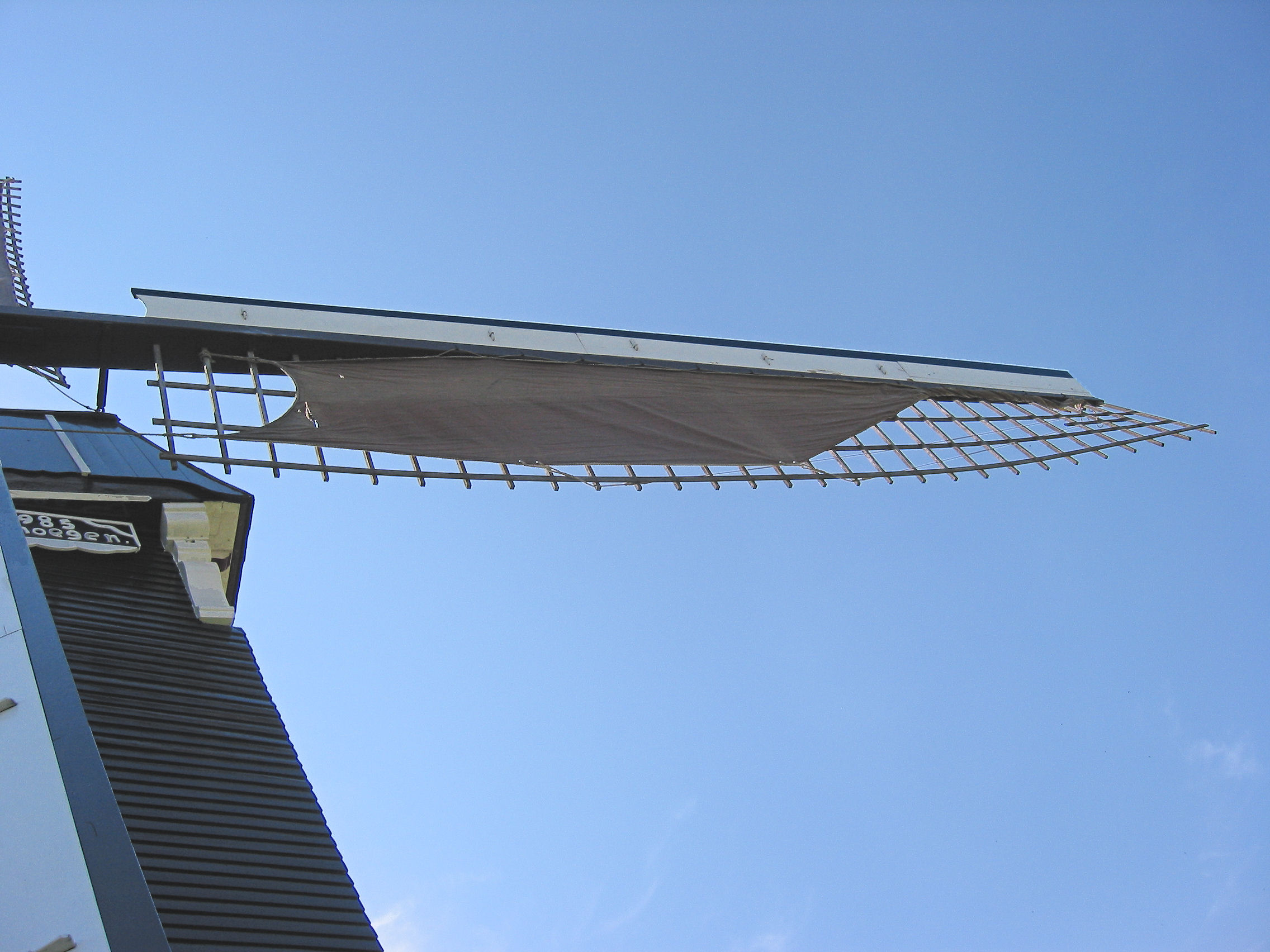
Sail

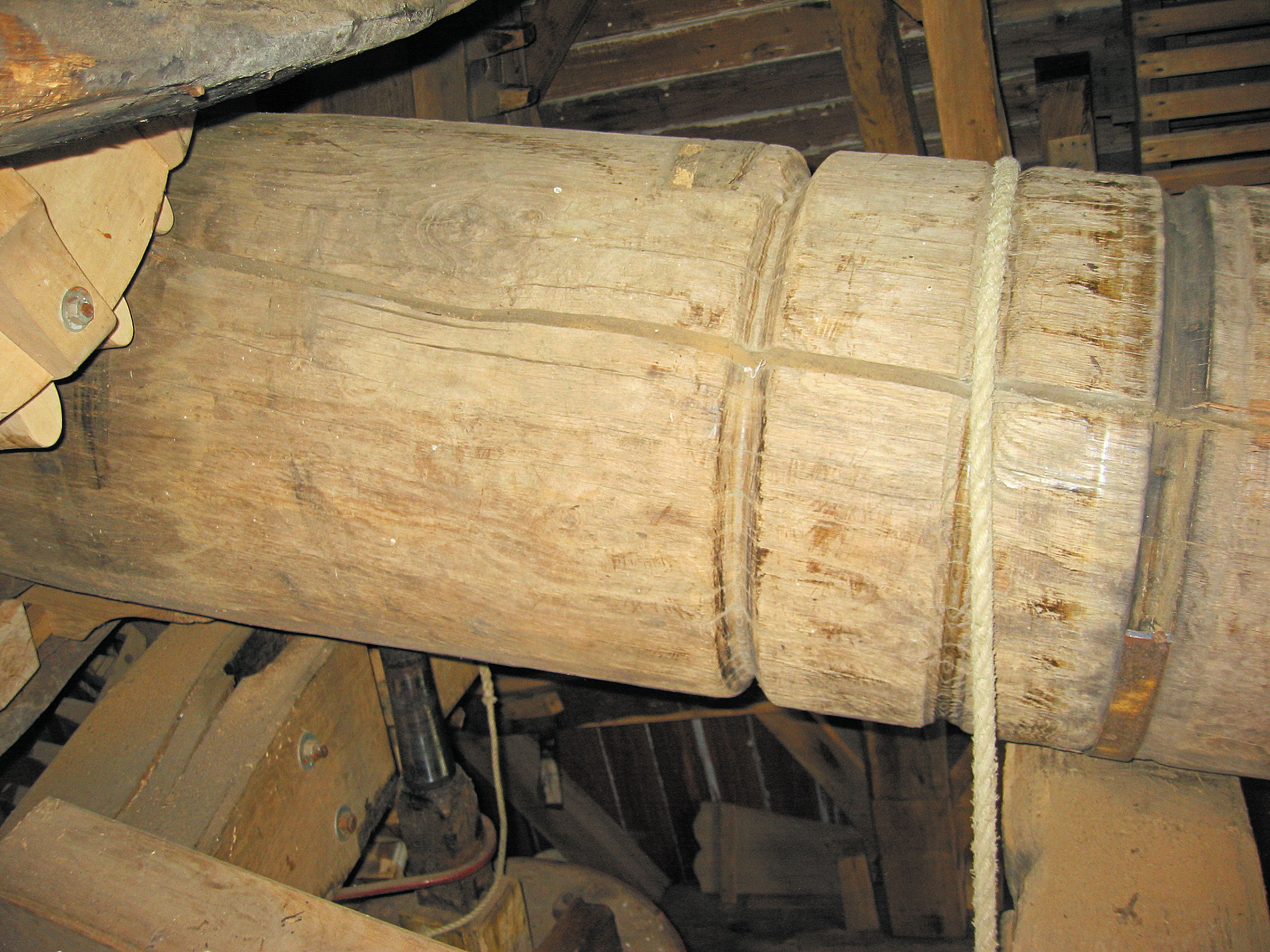
Oak windshaft

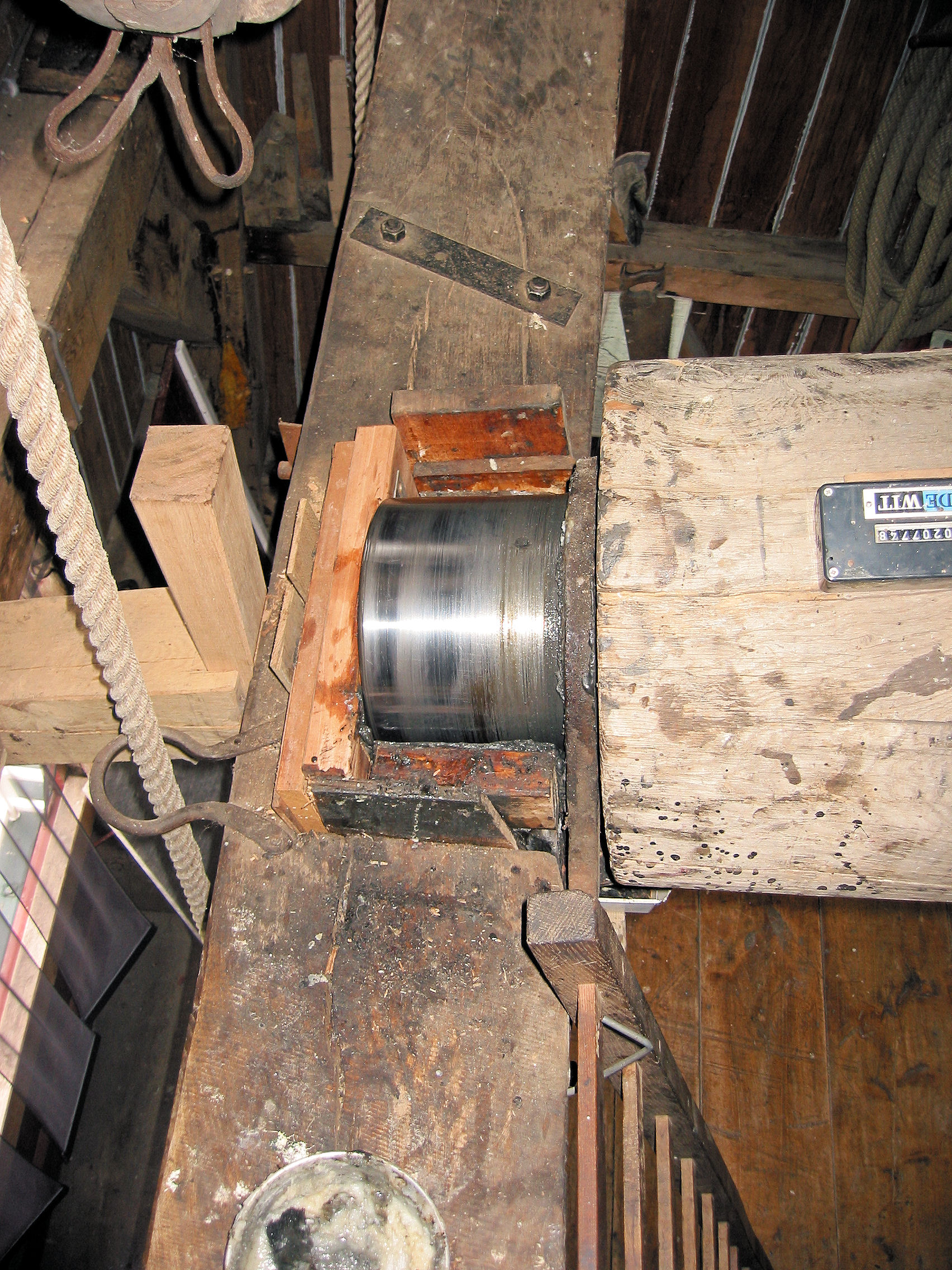
Pen upper shaft with iron hat and bronze plate

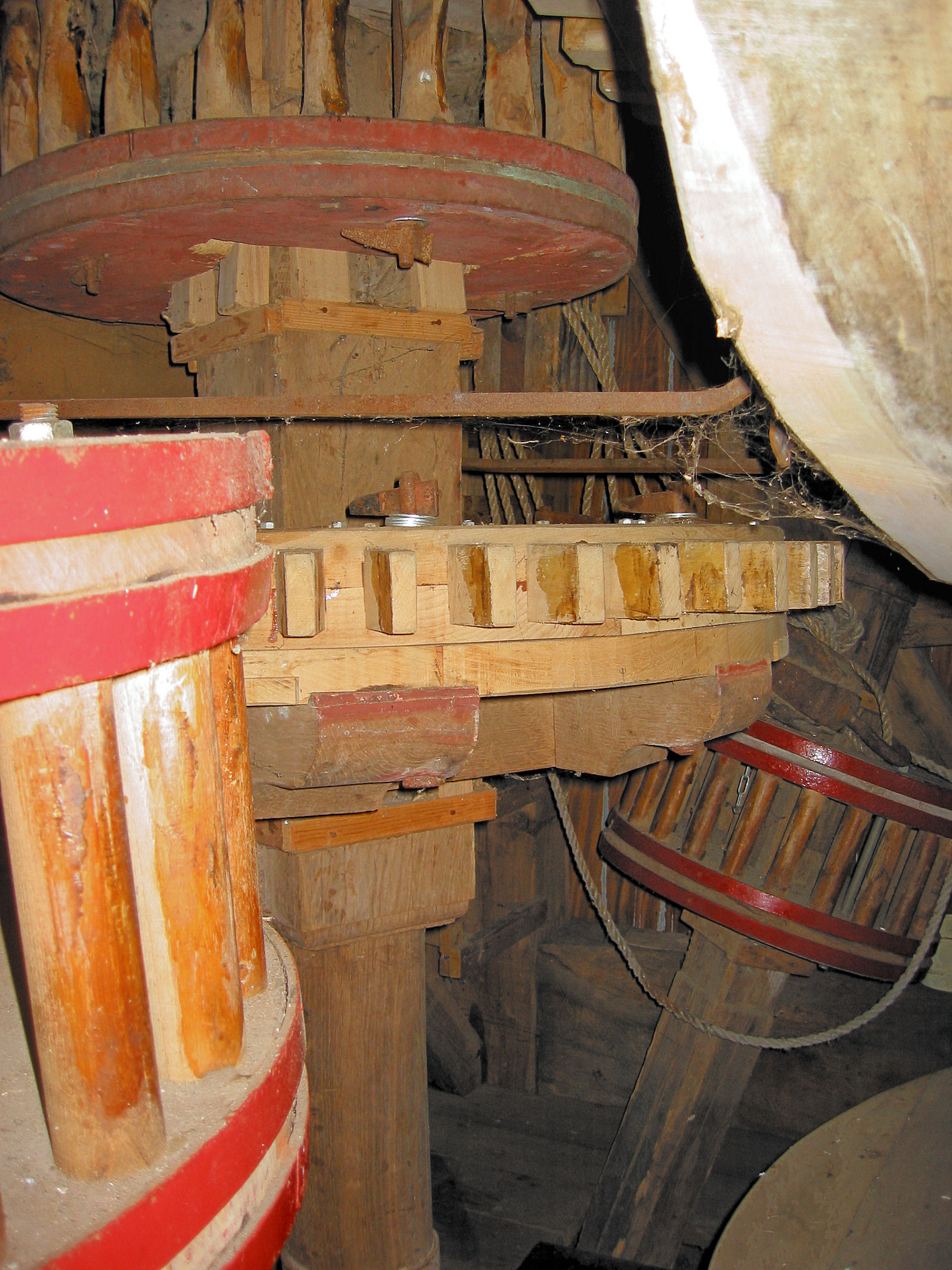
Track wheel

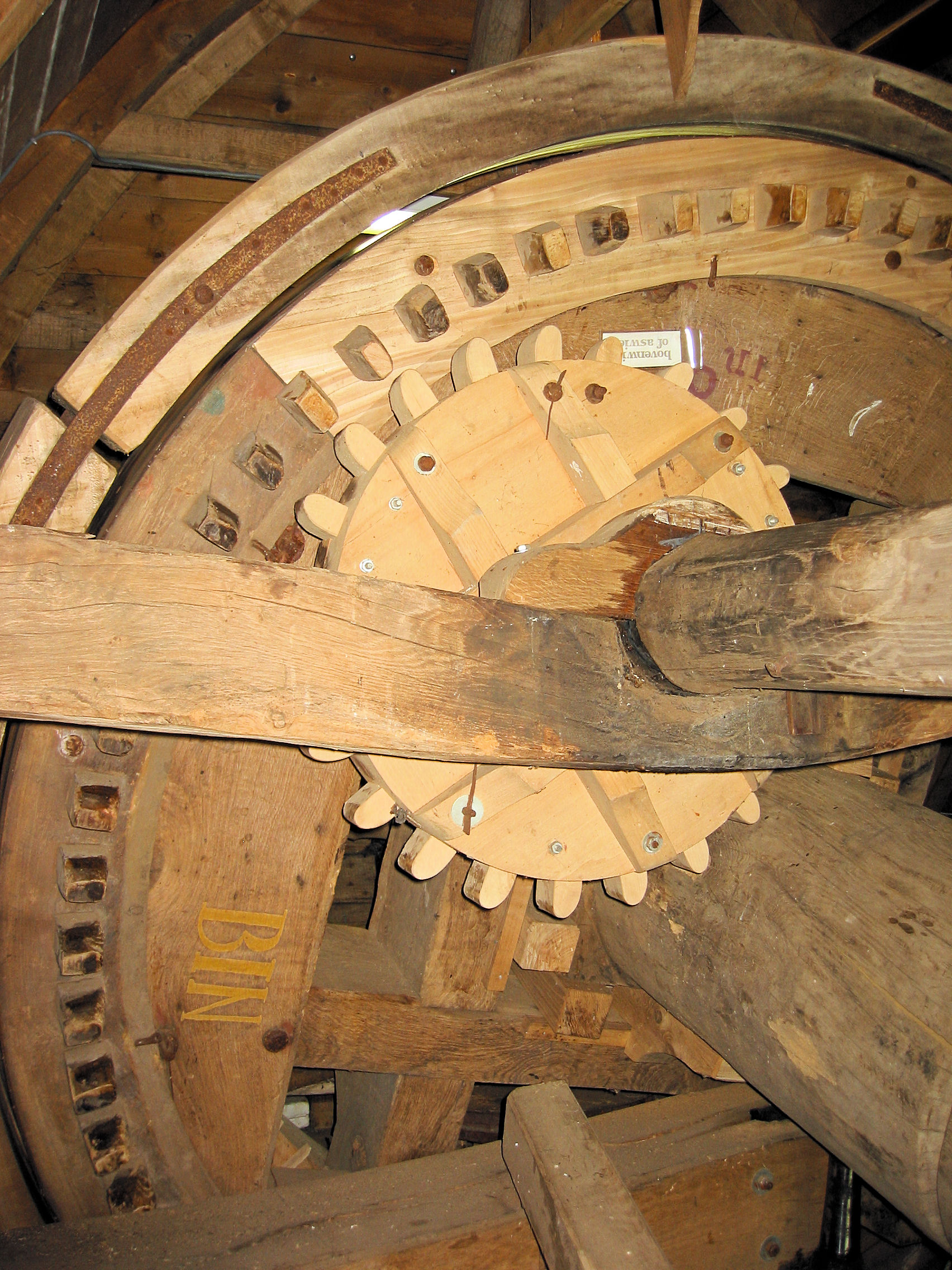
Pigs wheel with upper wheel

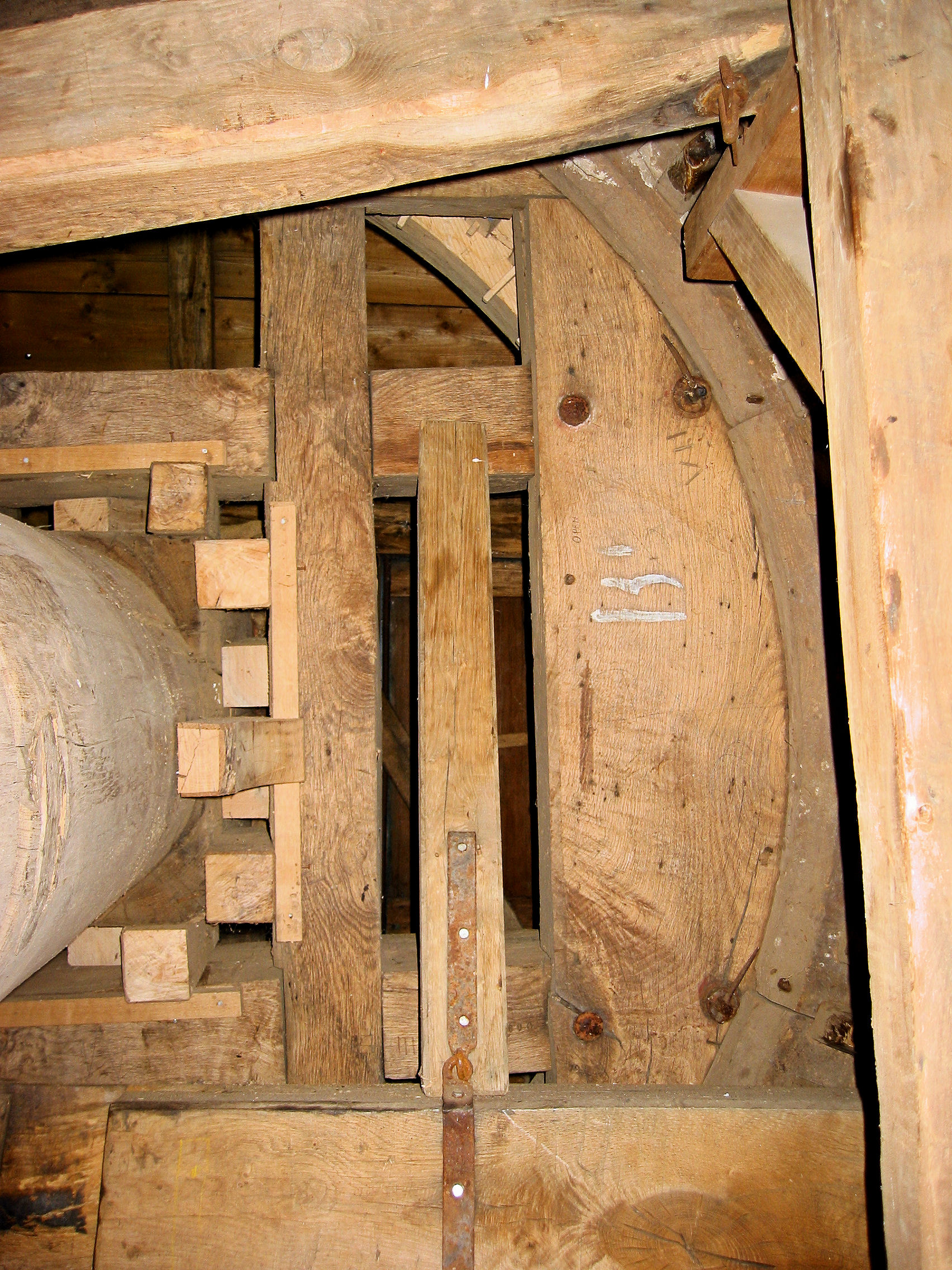
Strut for blocking upper wheel

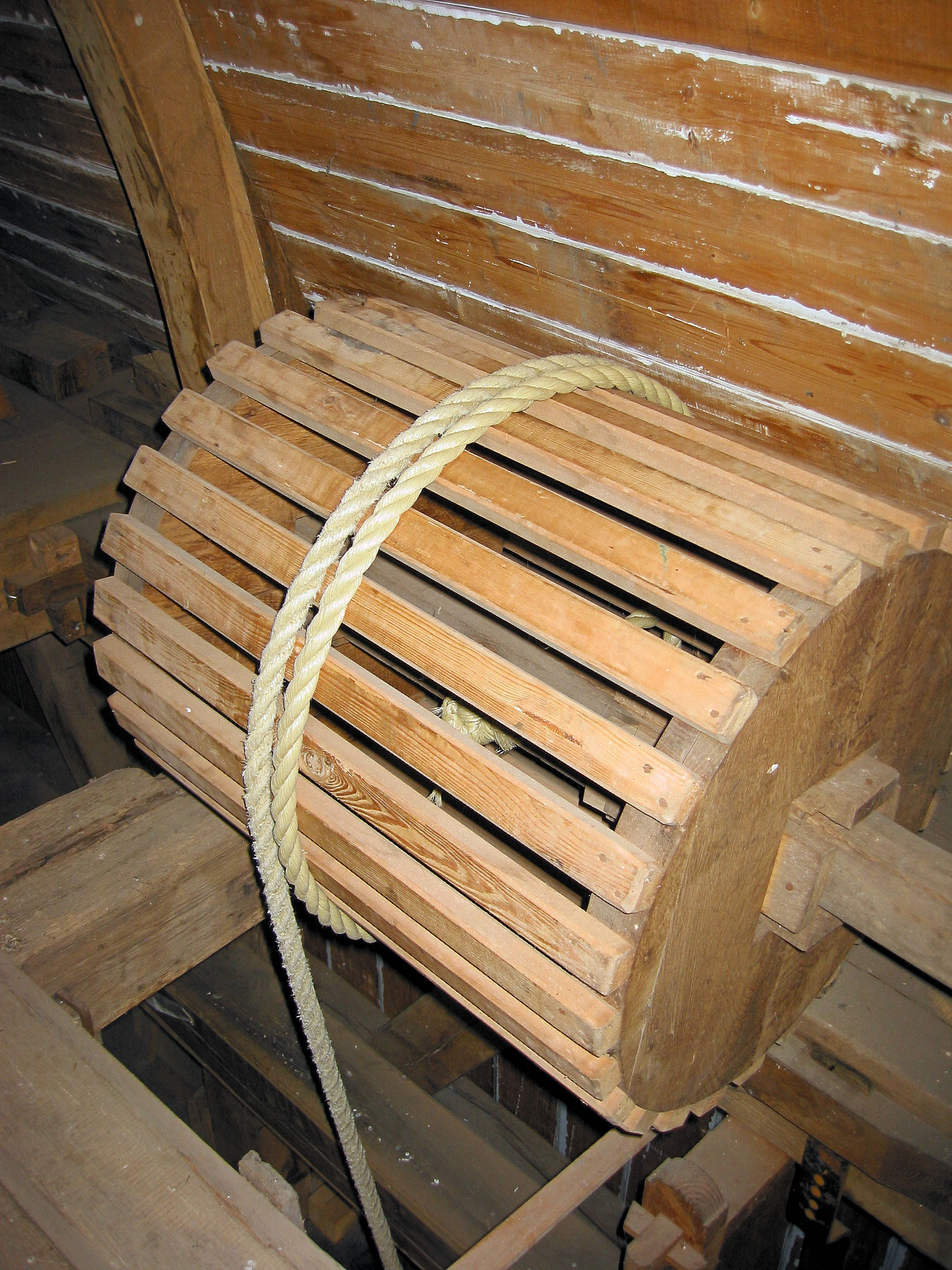
Catch Drum
