= Alphen, Gelderland =

Alphen Alphen aan de Maas
- Village
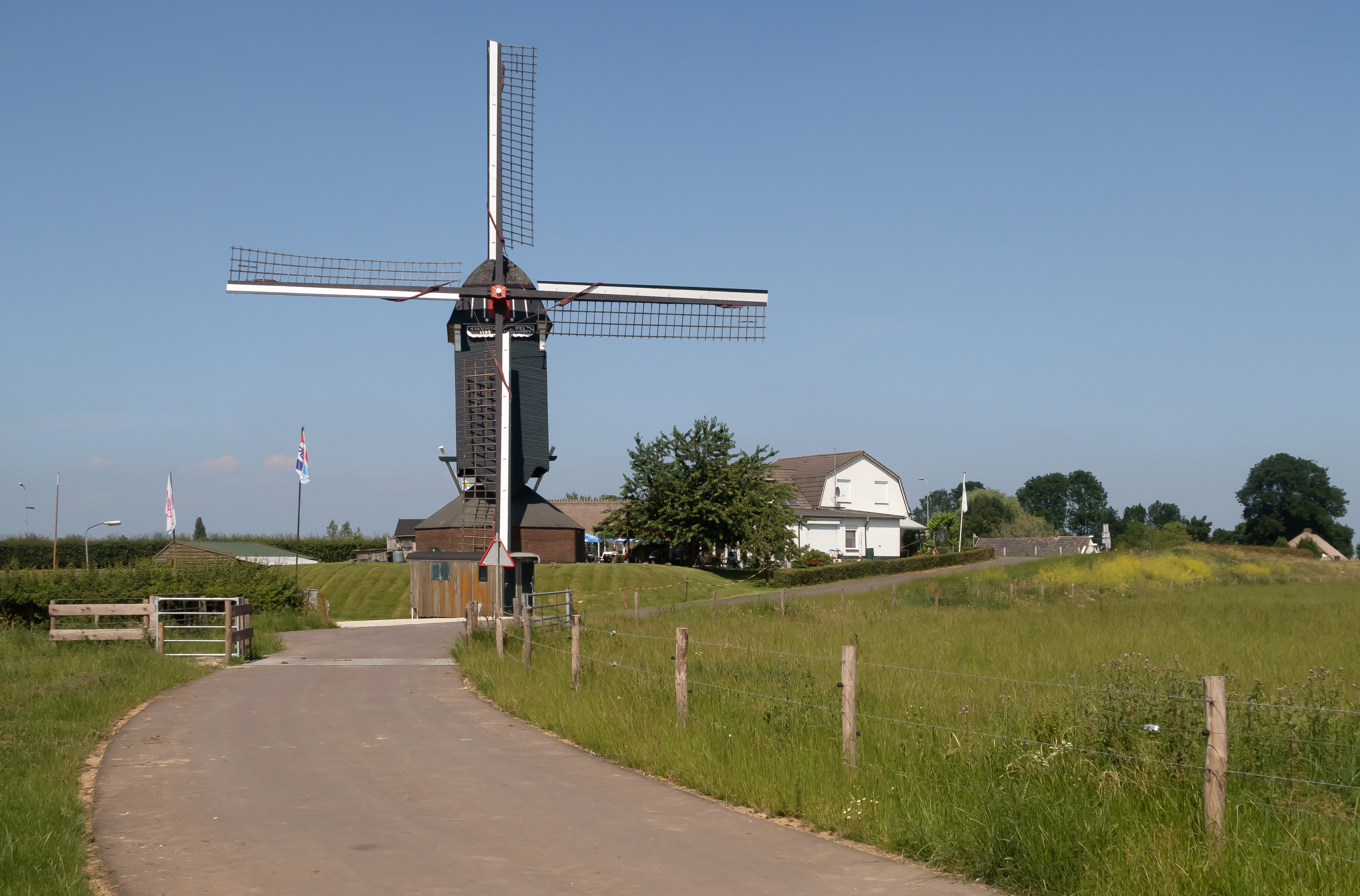
- Windmill Tot Voordeel en Genoegen

- Location in Gelderland Alphen (Netherlands)
- Coordinates: 51°49′21″N 5°28′15″E
- Country: Netherlands
- Province: Gelderland
- Municipality: West Maas en Waal

Area
  - Total: 11.75 km^{2} (4.54 sq mi)
- Elevation: 7 m (23 ft)

Population (2021)
  - Total: 1,675
  - Density: 142.6/km^{2} (369.2/sq mi)
- Time zone: UTC+1 (CET)
  - Summer (DST): UTC+2 (CEST)
- Postal code: 6626
- Dialing code: 0487

Alphen (also known as Alphen aan de Maas) is a village in the Dutch province of Gelderland. It is a part of the municipality of West Maas en Waal, and lies about 7 km north of Oss.

Alphen was a separate municipality until 1818, when it became a part of Appeltern. The statistical area "Alphen" includes the hamlets of Moordhuizen, Greffeling, and Nieuwe Schans.

== History ==
It was first mentioned in 1144 as Alfene. The etymology is unclear. It is often called Alphen aan de Maas to distinguish from Alphen aan den Rijn. The village developed along the Maas, and was originally a spread out settlement. The tower of the Catholic St. Lambertus Church dates from the middle of the 12th century. The church was constructed 1400. Between 1929 and 1932, the church was restored and enlarged. The Dutch Reformed Church is a modest building from 1818. In 1840, Alphen was home to 913 people.

The windmill Tot Voordeel en Genoegen lies just to the west of the village. The grist mill was constructed in 1798 and restored in 1963. An hydroelectric power station capable of producing 14 Megawatts of electricity has been built next to the wind mill.

== Notable people ==
- Tineke Strik (born 1961), politician

== Gallery ==
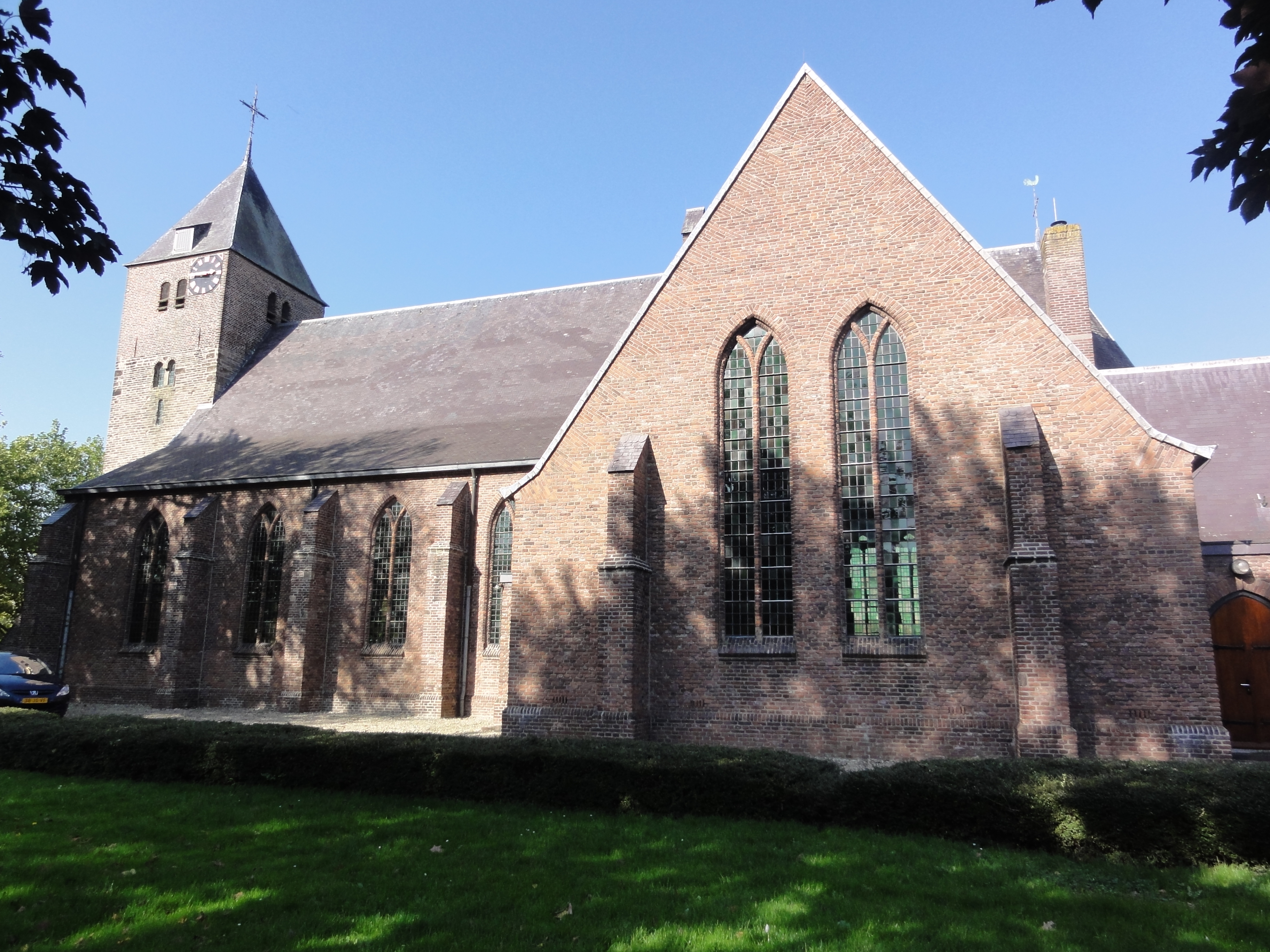
Lambertus Church

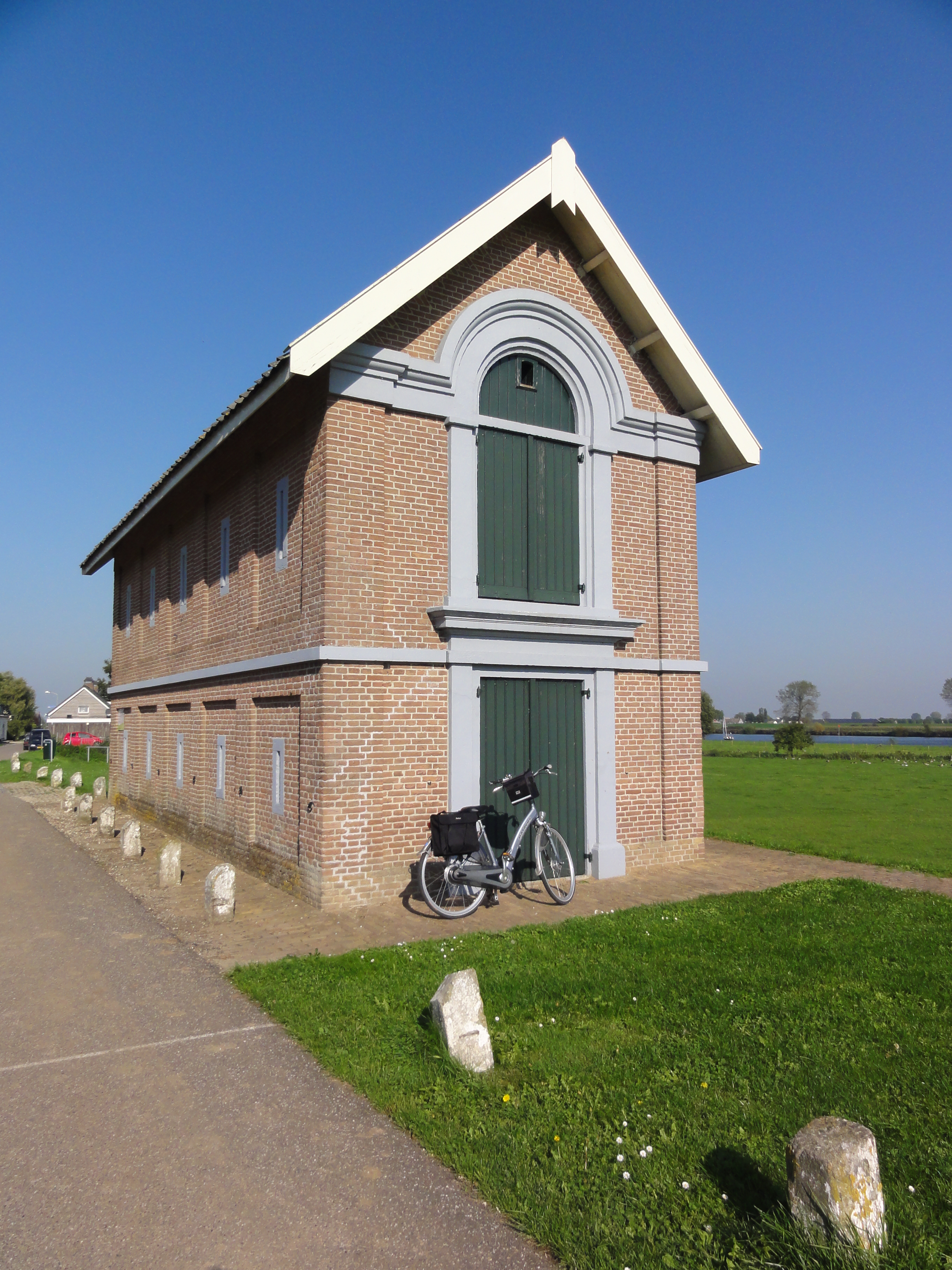
Dike shed

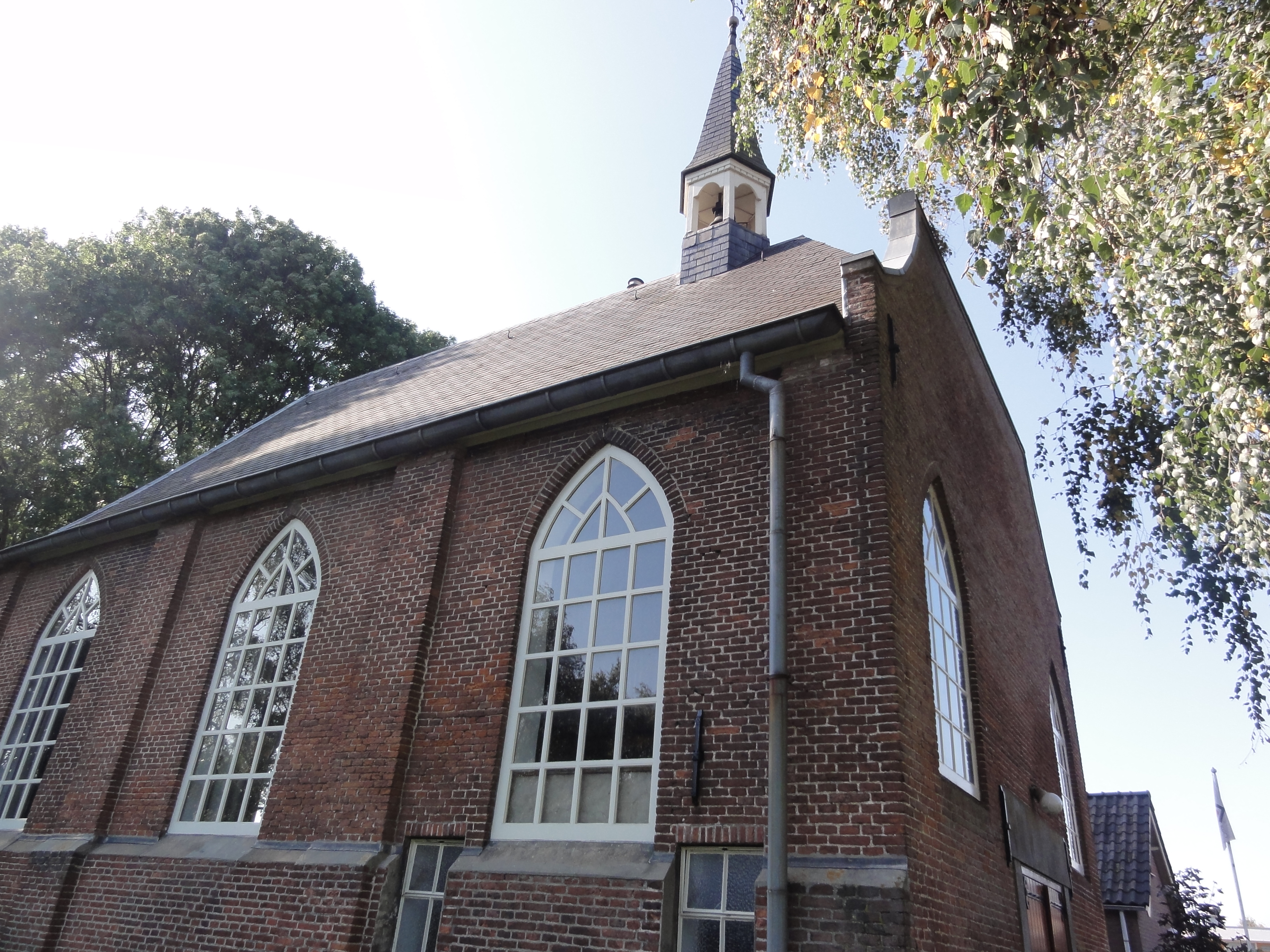
Dutch Reformed Church

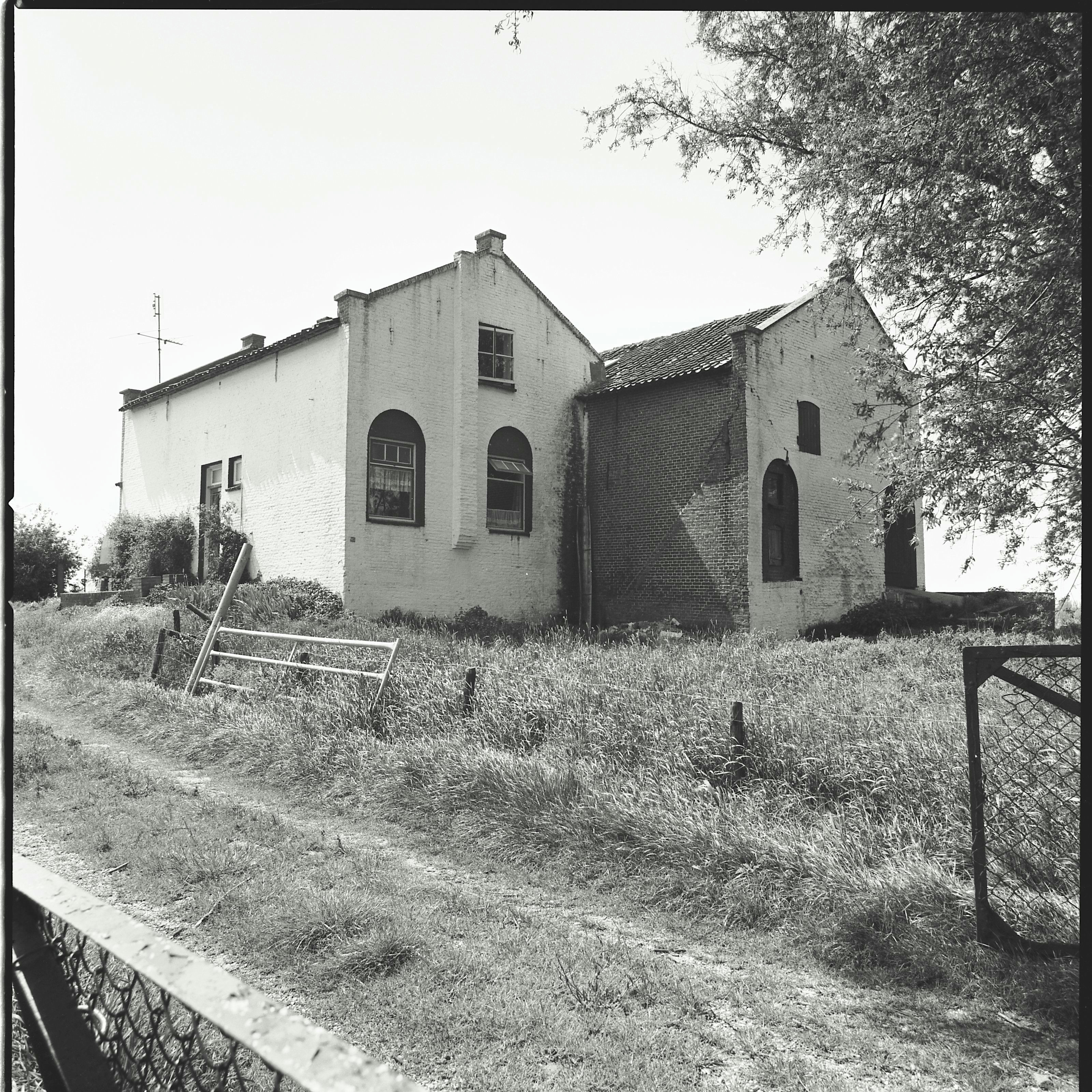
Former steam pumping station at Nieuwe Schans
